= Empress Nguyễn =

Empress Nguyễn may refer to:

- Nguyễn Thị Sen (fl. 970), one of the five concurrent empresses of Đinh Bộ Lĩnh
- Nguyễn Thị Anh (1422–1459), consort of Lê Thái Tông and mother of Lê Nhân Tông
- Nguyễn Thị Hằng (1441–1505), concubine of Lê Thánh Tông and mother of Lê Hiến Tông
- Nguyễn Thị Đạo (died 1516), Lê Tương Dực's wife
- Nguyễn Thị Ngọc Tuyền (fl. 1527), Mạc Thái Tổ's wife and Mạc Thái Tông's mother
- Empress Nguyễn (Mạc Mậu Hợp) (died 1600), Mạc Mậu Hợp's wife
- Nguyễn Thị Ngọc Đoan (died 1799), concubine of Lê Chiêu Thống and mother of Lê Chiêu Thống
- Nguyễn Thị Hoàn (1736–1811), empress dowager of the Nguyễn dynasty, Gia Long's mother
- Nguyễn Hữu Thị Nhàn (1870–1935), empress dowager and grand empress dowager of the Nguyễn dynasty, Khải Định's stepmother
- Nam Phương (1914–1963), empress consort of the Nguyễn dynasty, Bảo Đại's wife

== See also ==
- Empress Dowager Nguyễn (disambiguation)
