= Empress Dowager Nguyễn =

Empress Dowager Nguyễn may refer to:

== Lê dynasty ==
- Nguyễn Thị Anh (1422–1459), consort of Lê Thái Tông and mother of Lê Nhân Tông
- Nguyễn Thị Hằng (1441–1505), concubine of Lê Thánh Tông and mother of Lê Hiến Tông
- Nguyễn Thị Ngọc Đoan (died 1799), concubine of Lê Chiêu Thống and mother of Lê Chiêu Thống

== Nguyễn dynasty ==
- Nguyễn Thị Hoàn (1736–1811), Gia Long's mother
- Nguyễn Hữu Thị Nhàn (1870–1935), Khải Định's stepmother, also grand empress dowager during Bảo Đại's reign

== See also ==
- Empress Nguyễn (disambiguation)
