= Nguyễn Anh Vũ =

Nguyễn Anh Vũ (born 1442), courtesy name Nguyễn Tạc Tổ, pen name Anh Vũ, was an officer under era of Emperor Lê Thánh Tông. He was a son of Scholar Nguyễn Trãi and Lady Phạm Thị Mẫn. In 1442, because of Mystery of Lệ Chi Viên, his family were totally exterminated, but his mother escaped and gave birth to him as the name Phạm Anh Vũ. In 1464, Emperor Lê Thánh Tông officially pardoned Nguyễn Trãi and stating that he was wholly innocent in the death of Emperor Lê Thái Tông. Nguyễn Anh Vũ at that time successful passed Confucian court exam with title as hương cống(鄉貢) and became an officer of Court.

In some unofficial research, he has a sister named Ngọc Huyên (玉萱), or Nguyễn Thị Hằng, who later became Empress Trường Lạc hoàng hậu of Emperor Lê Thánh Tông

== Modern depiction ==
He was portrayed by Huỳnh Đông in the 2012 Vietnamese movie Blood Letter.

== See also ==
- Lê Thánh Tông
- Empress Trường Lạc
- Nguyễn Trãi
