= Ngô Thị Ngọc Dao =

- Born: 1421; Đồng Phang village, An Định district, Thanh Hoa prefect, Vietnam
- Died: 16 January 1496 (aged 74–75); Đồng Phang village, An Định district, Thanh Hoa prefect, Vietnam
- Spouse: Lê Thái Tông
- Issue: Lê Thị Ngọc Tú; Lê Hạo
Posthumous name
- Quang Thục Trinh Huệ Khiêm Tiết Hòa Xung Nhân Thánh hoàng thái hậu (光淑貞惠謙節和沖仁聖皇太后)
- Father: Ngô Từ
- Mother: Đinh Thị Ngọc Kế

Ngô Thị Ngọc Dao (chữ Hán: 吳氏玉瑤, 1421 - 1496) posthumous name Quang-thục Trinh-huệ Khiêm-tiết Hòa-xung Nhơn-thánh Dowager Empress (光淑禎惠謙節和沖仁聖皇太后), was a queen consort of Later Lê dynasty and mother of the Vietnamese emperor Lê Thánh Tông.

== Biography ==
Consort Ngô Thị Bính was born in 1421 at Đồng Phang village, An Định district, Thanh Hoa prefect. She was a daughter of a countryside teacher (吳生徒) and his first wife Đinh Thị Ngọc Kế. Her mother was born at Phúc Lộc village, Thụy Nguyên district, Thanh Hoa prefecture; she had been suicidal and the court gifted four gold scripts "Tiết-liệt phong-cao" (節烈風高). Lady Ngô Thị Bính has a younger brother who has no name in historical documents.

She met Lê Thái Tông on 16 July 1434 at Đồng Phang pagoda when he was incognito. She entered Lê dynasty's palace about 1435 and born prince Lê Hạo on 20 July 1442 at Dục Khánh pagoda.

== Family ==
- Duke Ngô Kinh (興國公 吳京, ? - ?): interior grandfather, so servant of Lê Khoáng.
- Dowager Đinh Thị Mại (興國夫人 丁氏賣, ? - ?): interior grandmother.
- Dowager Trần Thị Ngọc Huy (陳氏玉徽, ? - ?): exterior grandmother, so descendant of Trần dynasty's prince Trần Nhật Duật.
- Duke Ngô Từ (懿國公 吳徐, 1370–1453): older uncle and foster father, so servant of Lê Thái Tổ who was a son of Lê Khoáng.
- Dowager Đinh Thị Ngọc Kế (懿國太夫人 丁氏玉繼, ? - ?): mother.
- Consort Ngô Thị Ngọc Xuân (吳氏玉春, ? - ?): older sister, so Lê Thái Tổ's concubine.
- Duke Ngô Khế (清國公 吳契, 1426–1514): younger brother.
- Prince Lê Nguyên Long (黎元龍, 1423–1442): husband, so emperor Lê Thái Tông.
- Grand Princess Lê Thị Ngọc Tú (安國長公主 黎氏玉繡, ? - ?): daughter.
- Prince Lê Hạo (黎灝, 1442–1497): son, then became emperor Lê Thánh Tông.
