= Trịnh Khả =

Trịnh Khả (chữ Hán: 鄭可, 1402–1451) was a close advisor to emperor Lê Thái Tổ, chief ruler of Vietnam during the 1440s, and founder of the powerful Trịnh family.

== Biography ==
Trịnh Khả, like most of Lê Lợi's chief aides and generals, was from Thanh Hóa Province which is where Lê Lợi was born. During the decade-long Lam Sơn uprising against the Ming dynasty, Trịnh Khả served as an advisor to Lê Lợi. With victory, Trịnh Khả was elevated to a high position in the new court of Emperor Lê Lợi. Trịnh Khả (and the other councilors) were given the privilege of wearing red silk and were called Hành-khiển. Other members of this new elite were: Nguyễn Trãi, Tran Nguyen Han, Lê Sát, Phạm Văn Xảo, Dinh Liêt, and Lê Ngan.

When Lê Lợi died in 1433, Lê Sát was appointed regent for the young emperor, Lê Lợi's second son, Lê Thái Tông. Lê Sát made use of his new power to remove rivals from the government, some were killed (like Phạm Văn Xảo), while others, like Trịnh Khả, were sent away to govern distant provinces of Vietnam.

Lê Thái Tông officially came of age in 1438 but found Lê Sát was unwilling to give up his power as regent. Lê Thái Tông looked for political allies and found Trịnh Khả. The new emperor appointed Trịnh Khả to command the Palace Guard. A few months later, Lê Sát was accused of ruling in place of the emperor and with the aid of Khả's guards, Lê Sát was arrested and then condemned to death. Not long after this, Lê Ngan was also removed from power, leaving Trịnh Khả as the main power behind Lê Thái Tông.

Officially, Trịnh Khả was the head of the Administrative Bureau (Chinh-su-vien) but the next four years were filled with intrigue as the various noble families in the court plotted to expand their power at the expense of their rivals. Trịnh Khả came out on top of this fight, being promoted to the position of Imperial Councilor shortly before Lê Thái Tông became sick and died in 1442.

With the death of the young emperor, the new heir to the throne was an infant Lê Nhân Tông. The government was nominally controlled by the boy's mother, Nguyễn Thị Anh (as Dowager Queen and Regent), but she was very young herself. Real power seems to have been wielded by Trịnh Khả along with Nguyễn Xí, Le Thu and two generals: Dinh Liêt and Pham Boi.

The government of the oligarchy was not very active but they sent six missions to the Ming Court. Some of the missions were complaints about raids by the Champa kingdom into Vietnam. In 1446, the government launched an attack on the Champa. The campaign was reasonably successful as the Vietnamese army captured the capital city of Vijaya but they lost the city to a counter-attack a year later. This was the forerunner of the 1470 campaign which would destroy the Champa.

As the years passed, Queen Nguyễn Thị Anh came into greater conflict with the Trịnh Khả and the other oligarchs who ruled the country. The Queen gained some support from the Confucian scholars who had passed the Imperial examinations and tried to rule much like their Chinese colleges to the north ruled in the Ming imperial system. The nobles in turn tried to limit the power of the scholars and maintain their own control over the government.

For reasons lost to history, the Queen ordered Trịnh Khả and his eldest son executed in August 1451. Two years later, upon the official enthronement of Lê Nhân Tông (at the age of 12), Trịnh Khả was pardoned and new lands were given to the Trịnh family.

The Trịnh family continued to be a major noble family in Việt Nam. In 1545, a great-grandson named Trịnh Kiểm, took control of a large part of Vietnam. His descendants ruled the north for the next 240 years (see the Trịnh Lords for details).

Three hundred years later, the Vietnamese officer, Lê Quý Đôn, said of Trịnh Khả he "served the public good, exhausted his virtue (on it), and considered the correction of evil and the presentation of instruction to be his own duty".
