= Atlas of Hồng Đức =

1490 atlas

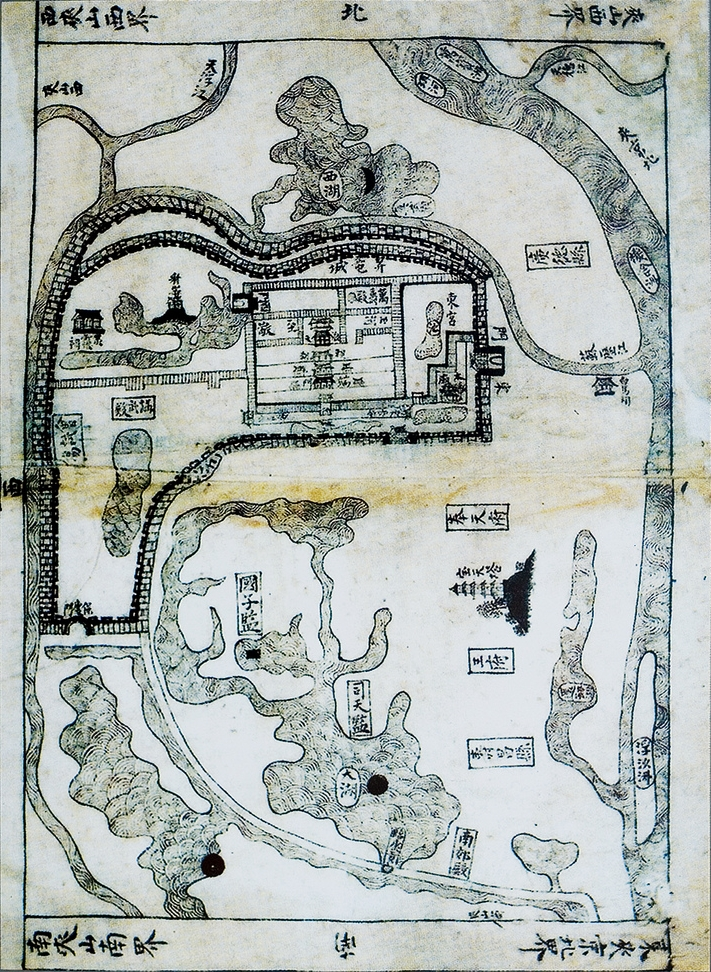
Map of Thăng Long

Atlas of Hồng Đức, known in Vietnamese as Hồng Đức bản đồ sách (chữ Hán: 洪德版圖冊), sometimes called the Geography of Hồng Đức is a set of geographic maps of Dai Viet issued during the reign of Lê Thánh Tông, the 21st year of Hồng Đức era (1490). The atlas was made in the 8th year of Quang Thuận era (1467) when emperor Le Thanh Tong ordered the mandarins to draw maps from each province and send them to the Ministry of Households. The map was completed and issued in the 21st year of Hồng Đức era (1490). However, the original atlas was lost. The atlas presented the outline of the border and the administrative system of Dai Viet in the second half of the 15th century.
