= Lê Nhân Tông =

Lê Nhân Tông 黎仁宗
- Emperor of Đại Việt
- Reign: 15 September 1442 – 25 October 1459
- Predecessor: Lê Thái Tông
- Successor: Lê Nghi Dân
- Born: 28 May 1441, Đông Kinh, Đại Việt
- Died: 25 October 1459, Đông Kinh, Đại Việt (aged 18)
- Burial: Mục Lăng, Lam Kinh, Thanh Hóa
Names
- Lê Bang Cơ (黎邦基)
Era name and dates
- Thái Hòa (太和): 1443–1453; Diên Ninh (延寧): 1454–1459
Posthumous name
- Khâm Văn Nhân Hiếu Tuyên Minh Thông Duệ Tuyên hoàng đế (欽文仁孝宣明聰睿宣皇帝)
Temple name
- Nhân Tông (仁宗)
- Dynasty: Lê dynasty
- Father: Lê Thái Tông
- Mother: Nguyễn Thị Anh

Lê Nhân Tông (黎仁宗, 28 May 1441 – 25 October 1459), birth name Lê Bang Cơ (黎邦基) in Vietnam was the third Emperor of the Lê dynasty from 1453 until his murder in a coup in 1459. A grandson of the dynasty founder Lê Lợi, much of his reign was under the regency of his mother, Queen Dowager Tuyên Từ.

== Biography ==
Prince Lê Thái Tông died suddenly in 1442, leaving the infant heir Bang Cơ under the regency of Royal Consort Nguyễn Thị Anh. The third son of the late prince, Bang Cơ’s elder brother Lê Nghi Dân had been passed over in succession line due to his mother's low social status.

The real power behind the administration at this time was Trịnh Khả, a long-time aide, friend, and counselor of Lê Lợi. By 1442 Khả had become the most powerful among Lê Lợi’s surviving top aides, with others having been either killed or demoted. Despite earlier concerns about an infant monarch on the throne, the administration appears to have operated smoothly with no serious problems. The mother of the prince, Queen Dowager Tuyên Từ, who was 21 when her son was enthroned, gradually assumed more power.

The following 17 years were recorded to have been relatively peaceful and stable, despite some disputes between the Confucian scholars and the aristocratic families.

In 1444 and 1445, the king of Champa, Maha Vijaya, raided Hoá Châu. In response, the Court of Annam sent messages to the Zhengtong Emperor of Ming China protesting these raids. The Ming did nothing other than rebuke Champa, so in 1446 the Vietnamese sent an army under the command of Le Kha and Le Tho to Cham territory. The campaign was considered successful, with the capture of the Cham capital Vijaya. Maha Vijaya was made prisoner with his wives and concubines, elephants, horses, and weapons seized.

While the Vietnamese were driven out a year later, the Cham did not mount another offensive campaign against Đại Việt for the following twenty years.

In 1451, for unclear reasons, Anh ordered the execution of Trịnh Khả and his eldest son. Two years later, Trịnh Khả was officially pardoned along with several other close advisors to Lê Lợi who had been killed (like Lê Sát). The pardon occurred in conjunction with the official ascension to power of Lê Bang Cơ, though he was only 12 years old at the time.

It is unknown how the 12-year-old Bang Cơ was formally given the administrative power. Vietnamese royal customs stated that power could only be awarded to the monarchs as early as they reached 16. This might have been an attempt to remove the Queen Nguyen Thi Anh from power, although she remained in control of the government until the 1459 coup.

In 1459, Bang Cơ’s older brother, Lê Nghi Dân, plotted his assassination with a group of officials. On October 28, the plotters, numbered around 100 "shiftless men," entered the palace and assassinated the 18 years old prince. The following day, facing certain threats of execution, Queen Dowager Tuyên Từ, ordered her servant to have herself killed.

This ended the nearly 20-year period when Vietnam was essentially ruled by a woman. Later Vietnamese historians offered two different pictures of this time, one court historian said this was a period of benevolent rule, with harmony in the court and idyllic peace in the land. Another historian said the court was in chaos and that having a woman rule the state was as unnatural as "a hen crowing at daybreak". Competent counselors like Trịnh Khả had been removed from office and inept men had been elevated, leading to assumed oppression and calamity.

Despite the successful coup, Lê Nghi Dân would be removed from power and killed in a counter-coup only 9 months later by his youngest brother Lê Tư Thành.

== See also ==
- List of Vietnamese dynasties

== Notes ==
Preceded by Lê Thái Tông	Emperor of Vietnam (ruled only from 1453 to 1459); 1441–1459	Succeeded by Lê Nghi Dân
