= Nguyễn Xí =

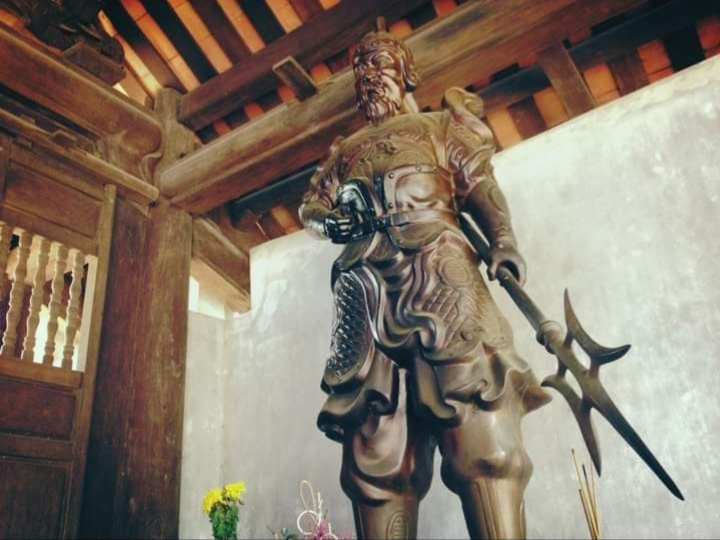

Right Imperial Chancellor of the Lê dynasty of Đại Việt
- Reign: 1428–1433
- Predecessor: None
- Successor: Nguyễn Sư Hồi
- Born: 10 September 1397/1397; Lam Son
- Died: 5 September 1465
- Burial: Nghệ An Tomb, Lam Sơn
- Spouses: Lê Thị Ngọc Lan
- Issue: Nguyễn Sư Hồi; Nguyễn Bá Sương
Names
- Nguyễn Xí (阮熾)
Posthumous name
- Thái Sư Cương Quốc Công, Thượng Đẳng Phúc Thần Hiển Uy Chính Nghị Anh Kiệt Đại Vương.
- Father: Nguyễn Hội
- Mother: Vũ Thị Hạnh

Nguyễn Xí (chữ Hán: 阮熾; 1397–1465), or Lê Xí, was a general, politician, and public servant who served as a minister for four generations of rulers during the late Lê dynasty of Đại Việt, a tributary state of China in what is now northern Vietnam.

He grew up while Đại Việt was under the Fourth Era of Northern Domination under the Ming dynasty of China and participated in Lam Sơn uprising under Lê Lợi. He is considered a historical military genius of Vietnam.

== Biography ==
Nguyễn Xí in Chinese means "Light of Light" was born in 1397. His grandfather was Nguyen Hop and his father was Nguyen Hoi. Nguyen Hop moved his house to live in Thuong Xa village, Chan Phuc district, now Khanh Hop commune, Nghi Loc district, Nghe An province. Here, Nguyen Hop and Nguyen Hoi rallied his people to establish a hamlet and expanded the salt-making industry.

Nguyen Hoi fathered two sons: Nguyen Bien and Nguyen Xi. Father and son Nguyen Hoi and Nguyen Bien often sold salt in Luong Giang area, Thieu Hoa district – Thanh Hoa, hence becoming very familiar with Le Loi, who was then a tutor in Lam Son.

At the age of 9 (1405), Nguyen Xi first met Le Loi. In the same year, his father was mauled and killed by a tiger in his home town of Thuong Xa, so he followed Le Loi and became part of his household. Growing up, Nguyễn Xí displayed extraordinary valour, and was loved by Lê Lợi like a son.

Le Loi ordered him to raise more than 100 hunting dogs. He used the music as a signal, the whole pack obeyed with remarkable unison. Le Loi praised and believed that he had great potential as a general and gave him command of the army of Thiet Đot.

== Participation in Lam Son uprising ==
=== Significant victory against Vuong Thong at Thiet cave ===
Note: some of the dates are directly from ancient texts, with only the year adjusted to the Gregorian calendar. Months and dates follow the lunar calendar.

In 1418, spring, First Month, Canh Than day, Le Loi proclaimed himself "Binh Dinh king" and launched the Lam Son uprising. Nguyen Xi, 22 years old at the time, and his brother Nguyen Bien joined Le Loi.

On the 16th of the first Month, the traitorous Ai led the Ming army to take a shortcut and assaulted Le Loi's forces from the rear, capturing his family and many of his household members. Many soldiers left, but only Le Xi and Le Le, Le Nao, Le Bi and Le Dap followed Le Loi to take refuge in Chi Linh Mountain.

In the eighth month of 1426, after gaining control of the region from Thanh Hoa to Thuan Hoa, Le Loi assigned troops to his generals forming three wings advancing to the north. Pham Van Xao, Do Bi, Trinh Kha, Le Trien to the Northwest, Luu Nhan Chu and Bui Be to the Northeast; Dinh Le and Nguyen Xi attacked Dong Quan (Eastern Gate).

Le Trien approached Dong Quan and encountered Tran Tri and promptly defeated him. Hearing that the Ming reinforcements from Yunnan were about to arrive, Trien divided his troops into Pham Van Xao, and Trinh Kha to intercept Yunnan troops, while Triet and Do Bi joined with Dinh Le and Nguyen Xi troops to attack Dong Quan (Thang Long, Hanoi).

Pham Van Xao routed the Yunnan reinforcements and they fled to the fortress of Changjiang, entrenching themselves. King Ming then sent Vuong Thong and Ma Anh to bring reinforcements. Combining with the troops in Dong Quan, troop count was a hundred thousand (100,000), divided into Phuong Chinh and Ma Ky. Le Trien and Do Bi defeated Ma Ky in Tu Liem and then defeated Chinh's wing as well. Both generals lost and retreated to Co So, joining up with Vuong Thong. Le Trien again attacked Vuong Thong, but Thong was prepared. Thus Trien was defeated and had to retreat to Cao Bo, and sent a messenger to request help from Nguyen Xi.

Nguyen Xi and Dinh Le brought troops to put an ambush in Tot cave and Chuc cave. Nguyễn Xí captured Vương Thông's spy, thus finding out his plan to divide up his army, and using a signal fireworks to attack Le Trien from both front and back. He and Dinh Le planned to use Thong's plan against him, by enticing him into an ambush into Tot cave, then set off a signal fireworks to signal the Ming army to enter. Vuong Thong army took a severe loss, with Tran Hiep, Ly Luong and 50,000 troops killed, and 10,000 captured. Thong and his generals ran back to entrench themselves in Dong Quan.

=== Dong Quan Prison Break ===
Le Loi was informed of the victory and marched the bulk of his army to the north and lay siege to Dong Quan. Nguyen Xi was ordered to bring Dinh Le and troops to the south of the city.

In the Second Month of 1427, Ming general Phuong Chinh ambushed Le Trien in Tu Liem, and Trien was killed in battle. In the Third Month, Vuong Thong attacked Lam Son camp in Tay Phu Liet. Nguyen Xi and Dinh Le brought 500 armored troops to reinforce, driving the Ming army to My cave. Lam Son rear army did not keep up, so Vuong Thong turned back and fought. The two generals rode an elephant into a swamp, got stuck, and were captured by the Ming army and brought back to the fortress. Dinh Le refused to surrender and was killed; and Nguyen Xi, during a night of heavy rain, deceived the prison guards to escape. Le Loi was overjoyed seeing him come back, saying: "Truly, he returned to life".

Afterwards, he participated in the battle of Changjiang to assist Le Sat in capturing Hoang Phuc and Khoi Tu, who were the survivors of the reinforcements after Lieu Thang was killed. It was the victory that ended the Lam Son uprising.

== Critical, high-ranking government official during 4 reigns ==
In 1428, Le Loi ascended to Emperor Le Thai To. Nguyen Xi was conferred with title and special privileges as one participated in establishing the country (by expelling the Chinese occupation).

Note: the official titles cannot be directly translated. Yet to find an article listing the common titles/offices of Dai Viet to link to.

In 1429, on the list of courtiers, Nguyễn Xí was ranked fifth, conferred the title Head of District, and granted the Emperor's surname.

In 1433, Emperor Le Thai To died. According to the will of the Emperor, Crown Prince Le Nguyen Long ascended the throne, becoming Emperor Le Thai Tong, only 10 years old at the time. Nguyen Xi was assigned assistant tutor to the Emperor.

In 1437, Thai Tong appointed him as the Deputy Prime Minister equivalent.

In 1442, the emperor Le Thai Tong died at the age of 20. Nguyen Xi and Trinh Kha, Le Thu received the emperor's will to serve the next Emperor Le Nhan Tong.

In 1445, Emperor Nhan Tong was a young, Queen Nguyen Thi Anh regent, he entered the Admiral and received orders from Le Than to bring troops to fight Chiem Thanh, but if not gone, the right to denounce sins should be abolished. function. In 1448 Nguyễn Xí was restored to the rank of Major General Military Civilian. [5] In 1450, he was promoted to Thai Bao as an official helper.

In October 1459, he was different from Nhan Tong's mother, Lạng Sơn Vương Lê Nghi Dân, as a mutiny to kill Queen Nguyen Thi Anh and Emperor Nhan Tong. Nghi Dan ascended the throne of the emperor and named Thien Hung. The ambassadors Do Bi, Le Thu, and Le Ngang who attempted to overthrow King Revealed were killed. Thai security told Nguyen Xi to discuss with Le Lang (Le Trien's son), and Le Niem (Le Lai's grandson) to make a coup again to overthrow Nghi Dan.

On June 6 of the lunar calendar in 1460, Nguyen Xi launched a mutiny, slashed at Nghi Dan's close servants, Pham Don, and Phan Ban in the Street Agenda, seized the forbidden army, closed the gates tightly, and ordered Le Ninh Thuan to arrest them. besieged and deposed Emperor Thien Hung as Le Duc Hau, and took the youngest son of Thai Tong Tu Thanh to the throne, the emperor Le Thanh Tong, opening a period of prosperity lasting 38 years. [6]

In June 1460, Nguyễn Xí was appointed as an official of the People's Committee, Entering the State's Office of the Vice Principal of the Military Medal of A County, serving as a civil servant, giving a bag of gold and silver, a silver seal, and 5000 acres of hard soil. In October of that year, he was made a Chief of Public Relations.

In 1462, Nguyen Xi's son, Nguyen Su Hoi, did not agree with a number of high-ranking mandarins, so he wrote poems and threw them on the street to slander them but rebelled them. King Tong Tong respected his efforts and did not cure Master's sin. [7] That year, he was promoted to the rank of Organic Import of the Nation. In 1463 he was again a Thai lieutenant.

In 1465, Nguyen Xi died, aged 69, and was ordained as a Thai monk.

End of mourning, in 1467, Emperor Le Thanh Tong ordered the temple to be rebuilt according to the national and international regime and ordered the poet Nguyen Trung Truc to write the epitaph inscription: "Superior superiority and blessedness, showing the dignity of the elders. Trung Trinh Dai Vuong ".

In the 15th year of Hong Duc's reign (1484), he was conferred the title of National Duchy, after being conferred the title of "Superior God of Blessings, Appealing for the Righteous Prayer of the Great King", erected a temple in Nghi Hop commune, Nghi Loc district, province. Nghe An. [8] In 1485 Lê Thánh Tông ordained Father Nguyễn Xí to become a crown prince to Duke Nguyễn Hội and his brother Phiêu cavalry Lieutenant General Nguyễn Thái.

According to Dai Viet history, he had 16 sons and 8 daughters. The descendants of Nguyễn Xí later helped Le Trung Hung's family. [9]

== Comment ==
"Nguyen Xi King, King Wang, King Wang Wu calculated deep heroic capital. Help Cao Hoang when opening the country through hundreds of arduous battles. Help the anecdote at a goalkeeper. In addition to all the titles of general and martial; Before and after, I kept studying as a child and a child. Keeping yourself religious, and innocent as a pearl does not show light. Stunning face at the court, as fierce as a new sword. The mandarins all revealed their demeanor; all four seas see prestige." ” – Essay written by Lê Thánh Tông given to Nguyễn Xí [10]

In his Vietnamese History poem, President Ho Chi Minh praised him: “Nguyen Xi is an extraordinary person Several times, the Chinese and Chiem soldiers were chased. He has even high conspiracy, Our people know together one heart. So even though Tau hung hung, Our people still keep our home country. ”- Ho Chi Minh [11]

In his Vietnamese History poem, Historian Le Quy Don praised him: “Nguyen Xi during the reign of Thai To and Thai Tong. I carry, I carry, I carry, I carry ... During the reign of Emperor Thai To, Thai Tong and the paddy fields were full of buffaloes, they did not eat.”- Le Quy Don [12] In his poem History of our country Patriotic Phan Boi Chau praised him. " Nguyễn Xí, a patriotic loyalist in the blind old-time patriotism In the eyes of the old man Tien Founding the founder of a satisfactory literary regime, expanding the land and fairly wide shore, was a king of strategic heroes, though The Emperor Wu Emperor and the Tang Dynasty Emperor Tai were no better. ”- Phan Boi Chau</ref>

In his Vietnamese History poem, Poinsettia Nguyen Truc praised him: “Principality of Nguyen Xi Forever shining with the openness of the Nation, Thousand years glorious Chi Binh Ngo. ”- Nguyen Truc [13]

The poem "History of our country" addresses future generations and references historical events, including defenses against invasions, the Binh Ngo Dai Cao, the Tinh Ngan restoration period, and the contributions of Cuong Quoc Cong. Vietnamese historical figures, scholars, and rulers -such as Le Thanh Tong, Nguyen Truc, Le Qui Don, Phan Huy Chu, Emperor Tu Duc, and Phan Bội Châu -as well as oral folk traditions, have documented and acknowledged his historical legacy.

== Posterity ==
On the 30th of the first lunar month every year, at the temple of Nguyen Xi, in Nghi Hop commune, Nghi Loc district, Nghe An province (an ancient temple, large scale and architectural value, built today 546 year, national heritage), organized the Nguyen Xi Temple Festival. [1] In the ancient capital of Hue, Nguyễn Xí was appointed by the Nguyễn emperors as the "Show of Greatness of the Kingdom of Great Prince of the Great King".

His name was given to a street in Hanoi, Nguyen Xi Street connecting Dinh Le Street to Trang Tien Street (during the French colonial period, Boa-xi-e street, rue Boissière). His name is also given to a street in Ward 13, Binh Thanh District, Ho Chi Minh City.

Grand Master Cuong Quoc Cong Nguyen Xi is the ancestor of the Nguyen Dinh family. The Nguyen Dinh family has a total of 15 large genera, the main church of their family is the Temple of Grand Master Cuong Quoc Nguyen Xi in Nghi Hop, Nghi Loc and Nghe An communes. Up to now, the Nguyen Dinh family has expanded widely throughout the country, including abroad, but the most concentrated is in Nghi Loc district, Nghe An province. The Nguyen Dinh family is one of the most glorious families in the feudal regime of Vietnam, especially prosperous in the field of martial arts.

In the ancient capital of Hue, he was worshipped in the Temple of the Emperor of the Nguyen Dynasty, considered to be the nation's first patriarch, the General was registered by the historical dynasties.

Rarely has any god like Nguyen Xi been granted the title of national god twice.

In 2011, Nghe An Publishing House and the Council of Great Families Nguyen Dinh republished a second edition of "Cuong duong Nguyen Xi clan". On the occasion of the Nguyễn Xí Temple Festival 2012, the tomb area of the father, mother, and the tomb of Grand Master Cuong, the princess Nguyen Xi, was upgraded to be bigger and more beautiful with funding of over 2 billion dongs from descendants and tourists from near and far.

== Descendants ==
Nguyen Du Entrepreneur of the World Culture, The 11th-Generation Grandchildren Nguyen Xi Door belongs to the 10th branch [1]

Do Muoi La Nguyen Cua succession Chi 5 Nguyen Dinh family.

Nguyen Manh Cam (Nguyen Khac – Hung Dung – Vinh City – Nghe An) – Deputy Prime Minister

Nguyen Duy Trinh – Minister of Foreign Affairs – Deputy Prime Minister

Nguyen Phong Sac General Secretary of the Indochinese Communist Party.

Nguyen Manh Dau, Lieutenant General, Vietnamese Army.

Nguyen Dinh Khoa Hero of the People's Armed Forces.

Nguyen Dinh Loc Minister of Justice.

Nguyễn Đình Tứ Minister of Professional University.

Nguyễn Đình Hương (He was the Deputy Head of the Organization Board of the Central Committee of the Vietnamese Communist Party)

Nguyen Xuan Thang (Director of Ho Chi Minh Financial Academy)

Nguyen Xuan Duong (Chairman of Nghe An Province)

Nguyen Dinh Phach (born 1954) Formerly a Vietnamese politician. He used to be a Member of Executive Committee of Central Committee of Vietnamese Communist Party, course X, course XI, Secretary of Thai Nguyen Provincial Party Committee, Hung Yen.

Nguyen Dinh Uoc (Deputy Commander of Politics and Head of Politics of Military Region 4, Editor-in-chief of People's Army Newspaper)

Nguyen Dinh Khang, Secretary of Ha Nam Province, Participated in the preparation for the UN Vesak celebration in 2019.

Nguyễn Đình Chu with author authored a draft of Văn Thơ about Phan Bội Châu.

== Legend ==
But the story most often circulated is the story of Mr. Hoang Muoi's birth into Nguyen Xi, a good general under King Le Thai To, who helped the king to defeat the Minh invaders. Static (also home place). [1] [15]

The Holy Father is an important figure in the system of the sacred beliefs to worship Mother Tam Phu and Tu Phu of Vietnamese people.

Another legend is handed down as follows: Mr. Muoi was born to Nguyen Xi, a good general under King Le Thai To, who helped the king to defeat the Minh invaders. He was later assigned to defend Nghe An, Ha Tinh. is the home town). Here, he always took care of people's lives, telling the story that once a typhoon broke down houses, he sent his army to the forest to cut wood to build houses for the people, then opened a payroll. In a boat trip on the river, to the foot of Hong Linh mountain, there was a third storm surging, engulfing his boat and he turned right on the junction of the la, Minh Giang and Lam rivers where the spirit from the mine Flamingoes. While everyone was mourning the funeral, the sky was clear, glowing with yellow clouds, suddenly his body floated on the surface of the water lightly like no, his face still rosy as bright as the person who was sleeping, When he got to the shore, suddenly the surrounding soil was swamped, covering his relics. At that time, there were clouds of five colors in the sky, forming a chain (with the version said to be a chained bird) and natural soldiers and generals came to take him to heaven. Later on, he was assigned to defend Nghe Tinh, residing in Nghe An. People worship him as Mr. Hoang Muoi.

The main festival takes place on the 10th of the 10th lunar month every year. There is also the opening festival on the full moon day of March. The festival has activities such as picking up a boat from the Nguyen family to the temple, singing chau van, cockfighting, playing chess. The festival has attractive activities such as picking up a boat by boat from the Nguyen family to the temple, singing adoration, cockfighting, playing chess ... Mr. Ong Muoi Temple is also one of the places where the Great Requiem ceremony takes place. the heroic martyrs died in the resistance war against the invaders. The main festival on the full moon in January and the July sacrificial ritual at the temple, then procession to the communal house in the government, opening the funny festival 3 the day, there is a competition to play chess, tug of war, wrestling and singing opera, cheo ward, chau van, sharp charm, dragon boat adoration, etc. to the fourth day of the procession to the temple. This is a big festival of the whole region.

.
