= Trần Cảo (king) =

Trần Cảo 陳暠
- Emperor of Đại Việt

ruler of Đại Việt
- Reign: 1426–1428
- Born: Hồ Ông (胡翁) ?
- Died: 1428
Names
- Trần Cảo (陳暠)
Era dates
- Thiên Khánh (天慶)

Trần Cảo (chữ Hán: 陳暠; died 1428) was briefly king of Vietnam 1426–1428. He was installed by Le Loi under the terms of a Ming dynasty Chinese withdrawal which promised to withdraw if a Trần dynasty descendant was placed on the throne. However, after Le Loi intercepted a Chinese general's requests for reinforcements he resumed the war, defeated the Chinese and made Trần Cảo drink poison.
