= Lê Nghi Dân =

Thiên Hưng Đế 天興帝
- Emperor of Đại Việt

Emperor of Đại Việt
- Reign: 1459 – 1460
- Predecessor: Lê Nhân Tông
- Successor: Lê Thánh Tông
- Born: June 1439; Đông Kinh, Đại Việt
- Died: 6 June 1460 (aged 20-21); Đông Kinh, Đại Việt
Names
- Lê Nghi Dân (黎宜民)
Era name and dates
- Thiên Hưng (天興): 1459–1460
Posthumous name
- Lệ Đức hầu (厲德侯)
- House: Lê dynasty
- Father: Lê Thái Tông
- Mother: Dương Thị Bí

Marquis Lệ Đức (Vietnamese: Lệ Đức hầu chữ Hán: 厲德侯, June 1439 – 6 June 1460), born Lê Nghi Dân (黎宜民), was the fourth Emperor of the Lê dynasty of Đại Việt. His reign lasted eight months before he was deposed by a group of court officials. As he was deposed in a coup, he was not given a temple name.

== Biography ==
He was the eldest son of Emperor Lê Thái Tông and Consort Dương Thị Bí. He became Crown Prince in 1440, however, was deposed in 1441 and replaced by his younger half-brother, Prince Lê Bang Cơ. He was given title of Prince Lạng Sơn (Lạng Sơn vương, 諒山王). After the premature death of Lê Thái Tông in 1442, the one-year-old infant Lê Bang Cơ was enthroned as king, posthumously known as Lê Nhân Tông.

== Diên Ninh coup ==
On 3 October 1459, Lê Nghi Dân launched a coup that killed King Lê Nhân Tông, and then declared himself as king.

== Reign ==
He put the Era name as Thiên Hưng (天興). The young king was very ambitious and tried to reform the government. He changed the administrative system to "six ministries, six departments" which was considered as a brilliant policy and this system still be followed by his successors. For the foreign affairs, he requested the Ming Dynasty not to pay pearls as tribute. He also titled his brothers, Prince Lê Tư Thành as Prince Gia (Gia vương, 嘉王), Prince Lê Khắc Xương as Prince Cung (Cung vương, 恭王) and gave them new palaces as new properties.

However, he was largely unsupported by many imperial court officials because he killed his brother, King Lê Nhân Tông as a "inhuman" action. During his short reign, he had to face many conflicts and coups from the old officials, who followed his grandfather and father since the dynasty was founded. Vietnamese historians reported the series of coups during Thiên Hưng's era as Thiên Hưng coup.

In May 1460, some officials, notably Đỗ Bí, Lê Ngang, Lê Thụ secretly discussed about a coup against Lê Nghi Dân, but the discussion was leaked out and all of them were put to death.

After this affair, Thiên Hưng became more suspicious, and he started installed his inner supporters into the Royal court's important official positions. It made him even more unpopular among court officials, and they finally began plotting against him.

In 6 June 1460, a group of officials, notably Nguyễn Xí, Đinh Liệt, Lê Lăng, Lê Niệm, Nguyễn Đức Trung, launched another coup and successfully deposed Thiên Hưng Đế. He was demoted to Marquis of Lệ Đức (Lệ Đức hầu, 厲德侯), and does not have any royal mausoleum like the other Vietnamese rulers. Some unofficial reports stated that the coup leaders drove him to suicide, and Thiên Hưng Đế died in 1460, at the age of 21. However, also some others stated that he and her mother were exiled to Lạng Sơn and he lived there until his death in 1460.

After the coup, the coup leaders wanted to put the second prince of King Lê Thái Tông, Prince Lê Khắc Xương to the throne but received his refusal. Therefore, they decided to place Prince Lê Tư Thành as the fifth kingof the Lê dynasty.

== Notes ==
Preceded by Lê Nhân Tông	Emperor of Vietnam (ruled only from 1459 to 1460); 1459–1460	Succeeded by Lê Thánh Tông
