= Yên Định district =

Coordinates: 20.0436°N 105.6551°E

Yên Định District Huyện Yên Định
- District
- Interactive map of Yên Định District
- Country: Vietnam
- Region: North Central Coast
- Province: Thanh Hóa
- Capital: Quán Lào

Area
  - Total: 83 sq mi (216 km^{2})

Population (2003)
  - Total: 172,527
- Time zone: UTC+7 (UTC + 7)

Yên Định is a rural district of Thanh Hóa province in the North Central Coast region of Vietnam. As of 2003 the district had a population of 172,527. The district covers an area of 216 km^{2} (83 sq mi). The district capital lies at Quán Lào.

== Climate ==
Climate data for Yên Định
Month	Jan	Feb	Mar	Apr	May	Jun	Jul	Aug	Sep	Oct	Nov	Dec	Year
Record high °C (°F)	32.5 (90.5)	33.6 (92.5)	37.0 (98.6)	39.0 (102.2)	41.1 (106.0)	40.5 (104.9)	40.1 (104.2)	38.5 (101.3)	37.0 (98.6)	35.1 (95.2)	34.0 (93.2)	31.3 (88.3)	41.1 (106.0)
Mean daily maximum °C (°F)	20.4 (68.7)	21.1 (70.0)	23.4 (74.1)	27.6 (81.7)	31.7 (89.1)	33.4 (92.1)	33.2 (91.8)	32.0 (89.6)	30.7 (87.3)	28.7 (83.7)	25.7 (78.3)	22.4 (72.3)	27.5 (81.5)
Daily mean °C (°F)	17.0 (62.6)	17.9 (64.2)	20.3 (68.5)	23.8 (74.8)	27.2 (81.0)	28.9 (84.0)	28.9 (84.0)	28.0 (82.4)	26.9 (80.4)	24.7 (76.5)	21.5 (70.7)	18.2 (64.8)	23.6 (74.5)
Mean daily minimum °C (°F)	14.8 (58.6)	16.1 (61.0)	18.3 (64.9)	21.5 (70.7)	24.3 (75.7)	25.9 (78.6)	26.0 (78.8)	25.4 (77.7)	24.4 (75.9)	22.1 (71.8)	18.7 (65.7)	15.5 (59.9)	21.1 (70.0)
Record low °C (°F)	4.2 (39.6)	6.8 (44.2)	7.7 (45.9)	13.0 (55.4)	17.4 (63.3)	20.0 (68.0)	20.2 (68.4)	20.7 (69.3)	17.4 (63.3)	13.8 (56.8)	8.3 (46.9)	2.8 (37.0)	2.8 (37.0)
Average precipitation mm (inches)	19.6 (0.77)	16.6 (0.65)	32.1 (1.26)	61.5 (2.42)	153.1 (6.03)	186.7 (7.35)	205.6 (8.09)	264.0 (10.39)	326.7 (12.86)	192.1 (7.56)	64.8 (2.55)	19.1 (0.75)	1,547 (60.91)
Average rainy days	7.6	9.8	12.8	11.8	14.3	13.7	13.8	16.8	14.5	11.4	7.1	4.9	138.6
Average relative humidity (%)	85.3	87.5	89.7	89.8	86.1	83.5	83.9	88.1	88.2	85.8	83.7	83.0	86.3
Mean monthly sunshine hours	75.2	53.3	55.5	104.2	183.1	174.6	195.2	165.6	160.0	149.8	124.1	106.5	1,551.2
Source: Vietnam Institute for Building Science and Technology
