= Lê Thánh Tông =

Emperor of Đại Việt from 1460 to 1497

Lê Thánh Tông 黎聖宗
- Great Emperor of Đại Việt

Emperor of Đại Việt
- Reign: 13 June 1460 – 13 March 1497 (36 years, 250 days)
- Predecessor: Lê Nghi Dân
- Successor: Lê Hiến Tông
- Born: Lê Tư Thành (黎思誠); 25 August 1442
- Died: 3 March 1497 (aged 54)
- Burial: Chiêu Tomb, Lam Kinh, Đại Việt
- Spouse: Nguyễn Thị Huyên
- Issue: Crown Prince Lê Tranh; Prince Lê Tân; Prince Le Tung; Prince Lê Tranh; Prince Lê Cảo; Prince Lê Thông; Prince Lê Tác; Prince Lê Tương; Princess Lê Thanh Toại; Prince Lê Chiêu; Prince Lê Cảnh; Prince Lê Thoan; Prince Lê Kinh; Prince Lê Kiện; Princess Lê Oánh Ngọc; Princess Lê Minh Kính; Princess Lê Triệt San; Princess Lê Bính Hiểu; Princess Lê Lan Khuê; Princess Lê Bảo Huyền; Princess Lê Lệ Khanh; Princess Lê Lan Đường; Princess Lê Cẩm Thương; Princess Lê Mỹ Thuần
Names
- Lê Tư Thành (黎思誠)
Era name and dates
- Quang Thuận (光順)(lit. Follower of Light): 1460–1469; Hồng Đức (洪德)(lit. Great Virtue): 1470–1497
Posthumous name
- Sùng Thiên Quảng Vận Cao Minh Quang Chính Chí Đức Đại Công Thánh Văn Thần Vũ Đạt Hiếu Thuần Hoàng đế (崇天廣運高明光正至德大功聖文神武達孝淳皇帝)
Temple name
- Thánh Tông (聖宗)
- Dynasty: Lê
- Father: Lê Thái Tông
- Mother: Ngô Thị Ngọc Dao

- Personal name
- Vietnamese alphabet: Lê Hạo
- Chữ Hán: 黎灝

- Temple name
- Vietnamese alphabet: Lê Thánh Tông
- Chữ Hán: 黎聖宗

Lê Thánh Tông (黎聖宗; 25 August 1442 – 3 March 1497), personal name Lê Hạo, temple name Thánh Tông, courtesy name Tư Thành, was the emperor of Đại Việt from 1460 to 1497. The fifth and the longest-reigning emperor of the Lê dynasty, he is considered one of the greatest monarchs in Vietnamese history. He came to power through a coup d'état against his elder brother Lê Nghi Dân in 1460.

His reign is recognized for its extensive administrative, military, education, and fiscal reforms, the conquests of Cham states and expansion of Đại Việt territory in the south, and the replacement of the old aristocracy with a class of literati scholars. His reign was later praised as the Prospered reign of Hồng Đức (Hồng Đức Thịnh trị; 洪德盛治).

== Name ==
Lê Thánh Tông is known by several names, including his birth name Lê Hạo (黎灝), his courtesy name Tư Thành (思誠), pseudonym Đạo Am chủ nhân (道庵主人), rhymed name Tao Đàn nguyên súy (騷壇元帥), formal title Thiên Nam động chủ (天南洞主).

== Early life ==
Lê Tư Thành was born on the 20th of the 7th lunar month (25 August in Gregorian calendar) in the third year of Đại Bảo (1442). A legend surrounding his birth is that, his mother Ngô Thị Ngọc Dao, was bestowed a Tiên đồng (仙童) by the Jade Emperor in her dream, and started to become pregnant with Tư Thành the following day. He was the fourth son of emperor Lê Thái Tông and his consort Ngô Thị Ngọc Dao. He was the fourth grandson of Lê Lợi, the half-brother of Lê Nhân Tông and it is likely that his mother and consort Nguyễn Thị Anh (the mother of Lê Nhân Tông) were related (cousins or perhaps sisters). Young Tư Thành was described in the national chronicle, the Complete Annals of the Great Viet as "Magnificently gifted, his mind and body are marvelous, his looks elegantly strong; kind-hearted and generous, bright, earnest, truly the brilliant kind who deserves the title of Emperor, whose ingenuity and bravery will preserve the nation".

When Tư Thành was three years old, he was brought to the royal palace and was educated just like his half-brother, the ruling emperor Lê Nhân Tông, and other brothers, Lê Khắc Xương and Lê Nghi Dân in Đông Kinh (東京). In 1445, Le Nhan Tong issued a decree and conferred Le Tu Thanh as Prince of Binh Nguyen (Bình Nguyên Vương), and sent to kinh sư, to study with other kings in Kinh Dien. Officials in Kinh Dien such as Tran Phong noticed that Binh Nguyen Vuong had a dignified appearance and was more intelligent than other people, so they considered him an extraordinary person.

== Ascension to the throne ==
On the 3rd of the 10th lunar month, 1459, 6th year of Diên Ninh, Lê Thái Tông's firstborn son, Lê Nghi Dân staged a coup in the middle of the night, assassinating reigning emperor Lê Nhân Tông. Nghi Dân then proclaimed himself Emperor. Nine months later, a counter-coup against Lê Nghi Dân led by two military leaders Nguyễn Xí and Đinh Liệt was successfully carried out, and Nghi Dân was killed in the royal palace. The plotters asked Prince Tư Thành to become the new emperor and he accepted. Two days after Lê Nghi Dân's death, Lê Hạo was proclaimed Emperor.

The leaders of the counter-coup which removed and killed Nghi Dân were two of the last surviving friends and aides of Lê Lợi - Nguyễn Xí and Đinh Liệt. The pair had been out of power since the 1440s, but they still commanded respect due to their association with the dynasty's founder, Lê Lợi. The new king appointed these men to the highest positions in his new government: Nguyễn Xí became one of the king's councilors, and Đinh Liệt was gifted command over the royal army of Đại Việt.

== Reign ==
=== Bureaucratic reforms ===
Lê Thánh Tông introduced reforms designing to replace the Thanh Hoá oligarchy of Dai Viet's southern region with a corps of bureaucrats selected through the Confucian civil service examinations. Following the Chinese model, he divided the government into six ministries: Finance, Rites, Justice, Personnel, Army, and Public Works. Nine grades of rank were set up for both the civil administration and the military. A Board of Censors was set up with royal authority to monitor governmental officials and report exclusively to the king. However, governmental authority did not extend all the way to the village level. The villages were ruled by their own councils.

In 1469, all of Dai Viet was mapped and a full census, listing all the villages in the kingdom, was taken. Around this time, the country was divided into 13 dao (provinces). Each was administrated by a Governor, a Judge, and the local army commander. Thánh Tông also ordered that a new census should be taken every six years. Other public works that were undertaken including building and repair of granaries, using the army to rebuild and repair irrigation systems after floods, and sending out doctors to areas afflicted by outbreaks of disease. Even though the emperor, at 25, was relatively young, he had already restored Dai Viet's stability, which was a marked contrast from the turbulent times marking the reigns of the two emperors before him. By 1471, the kingdom employed more than 5,300 officials (0.1 percent of the population) into the bureaucrat army, equally divided between the court and the provinces, with at least one supervising officer every three villages.

A national-wide census was conducted in 1490, reported approximately 8,000 village-level jurisdictions throughout the country including the thirty-six urban wards that lay between the royal compound and the Red River at Dong Kinh, the only city in the country; with the total population was approximately 3.7 million people, the Red River delta had been the most densely inhabited region of Southeast Asia in the early-modern era.

The new government proved to be effective and represented a successful adaptation of the Chinese Confucian system of government outside of China. However, following the deaths of Thánh Tông and of his son and successor, Lê Hiến Tông (r. 1498–1504), this new model of government crashed not once but twice in the next three following centuries.

=== Legal reforms and a new national law ===
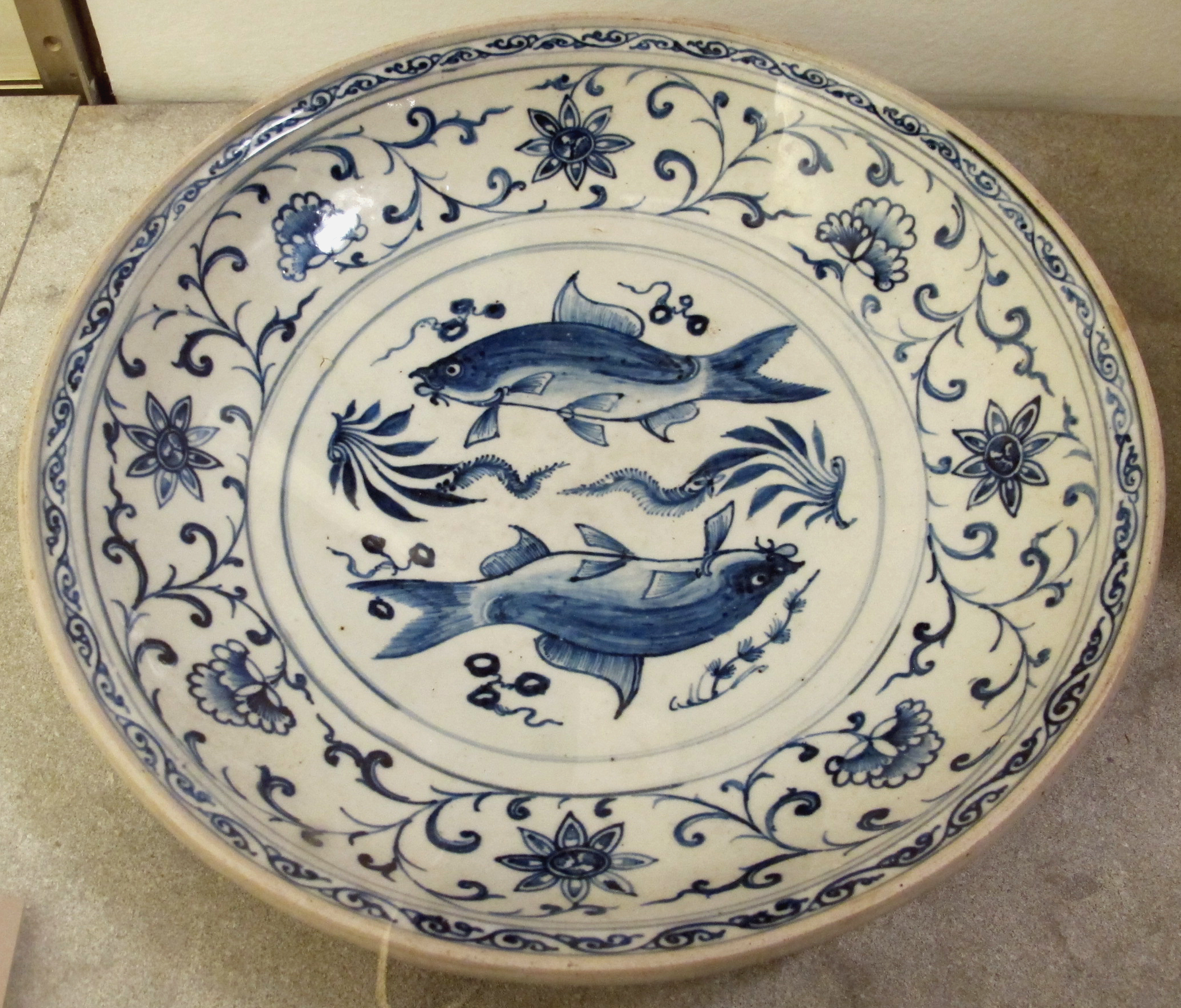
A Chu Đậu Blue and white patterns dish, was made during the reign of Lê Thánh Tông. Musée Guimet, Paris.

In 1483 Lê Thánh Tông created a new code for Đại Việt, called the Hồng Đức Code, which is Vietnam's National Treasures and is kept in the National Library in form of woodblocks No A.314.

The new laws were "based on Chinese law but included distinctly Vietnamese features, such as recognition of the higher position of women in Vietnamese society than in Chinese society. Under the new code, parental consent was not required for marriage, and daughters were granted equal inheritance rights with sons."

=== Economic policy ===
Ewer in shape of a dragon made in Chu Đậu, Vietnam during the years of 1460–1497, Cleveland Museum of Art

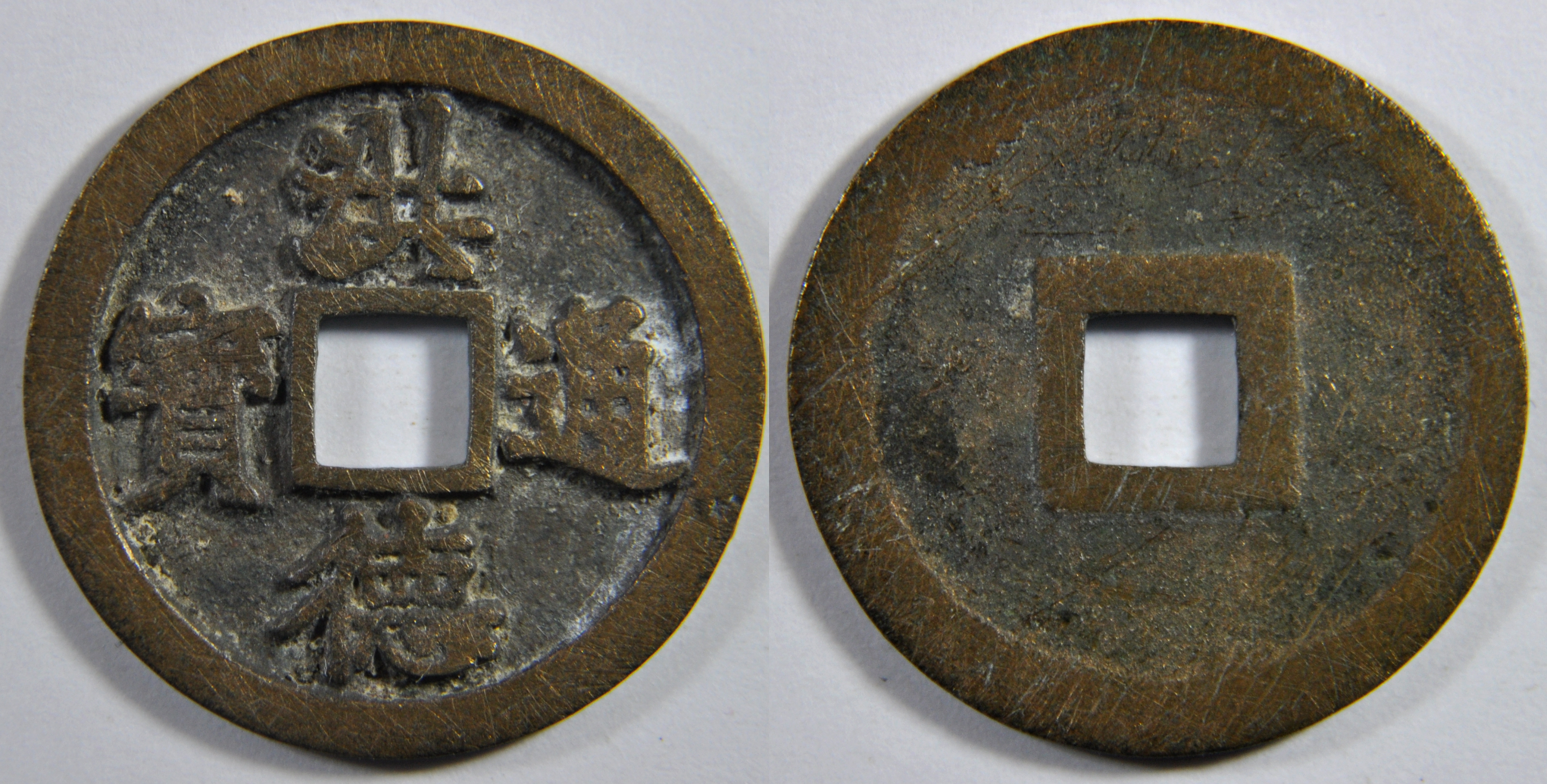
Coins issued by Emperor Lê Thánh Tông during his later reign from 1469 to 1497

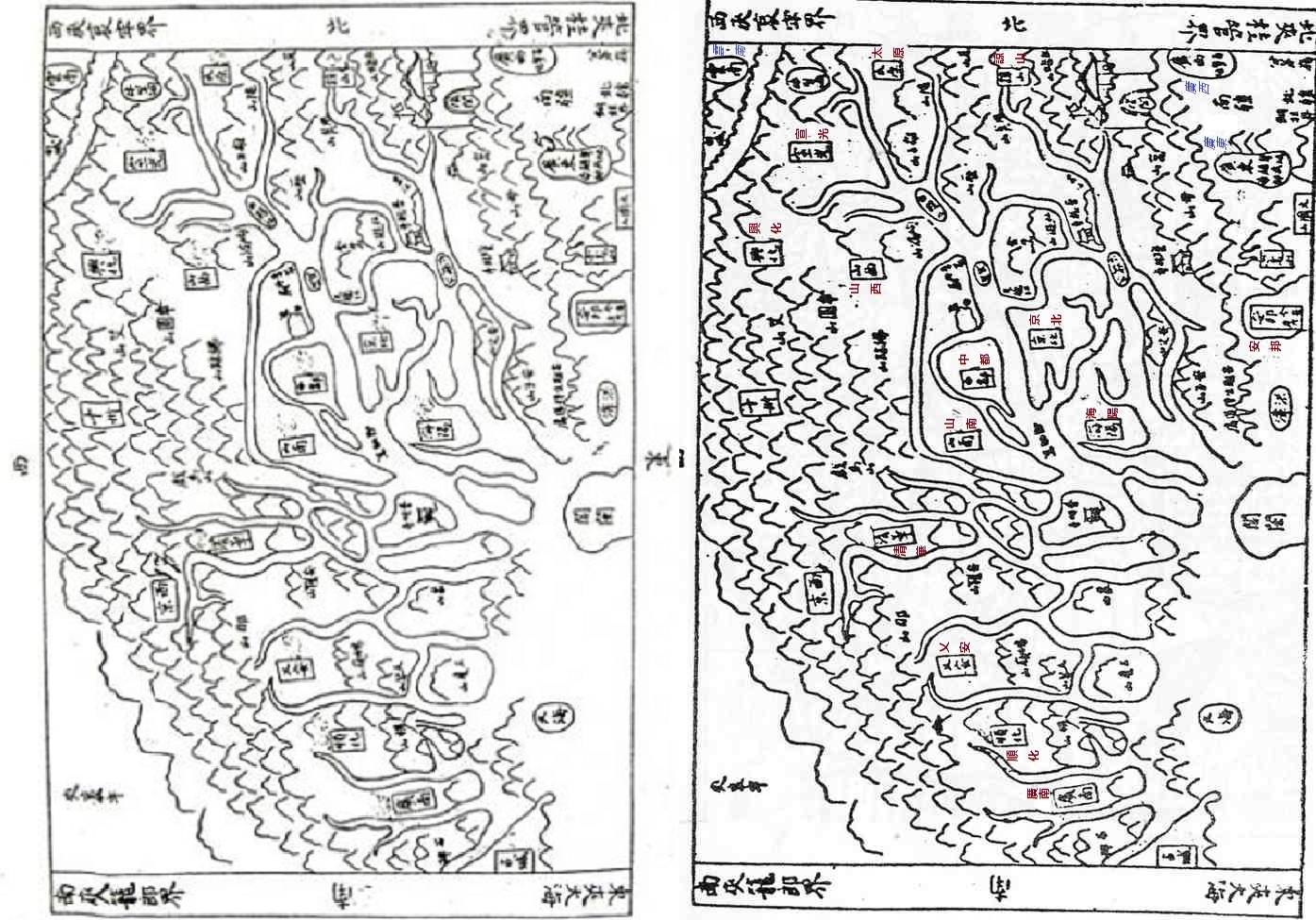
National map of Vietnam An Nam quốc đồ (安南國圖) of Hồng Đức era (1490).

During the reign of Thánh Tông, Vietnamese export porcelains from Hải Dương kilns were found as far as West Asia. Trowulan, capital of Majapahit, has yielded numerous Vietnamese ceramic products of the fifteenth century. However, he took an unfavorable view toward international trade, and emphasized for a national self-sustaining economy based on agriculture.

In 1461 he warned the provincial officials not to pursue the insignificant trade/commerce to ensure internal welfare and prohibit foreigners from entering the kingdom. He also introduced a marketplaces code to standardize weights and measures. In 1469 he nationalized gunpowder and weapons. After the defeat of Champa in 1471, he sent large groups of ethnic Vietnamese, including prisoners and criminals, to settle in the new conquered territories. Lands were distributed fair equally, bureaucrats and military garrisons were set up to help people in the new provinces. The fall of Champa enabled the Vietnamese to monopolize Central Highlands' products which most desired in oversea markets. At the end of 15th century, according to Hall, "Vietnamese civilization had reached its zenith in prosperity."

=== Education policy ===
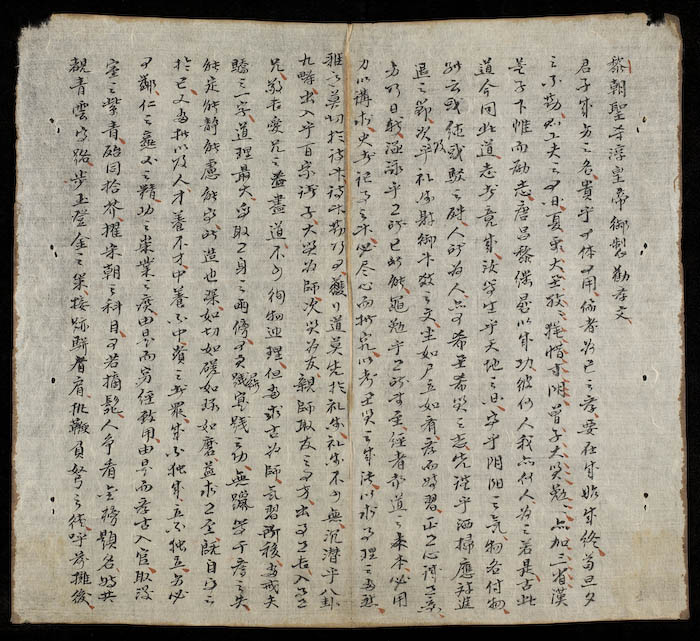
First page of an essay to encourage people study Confucian literature, written by Thánh Tông

Thánh Tông devoted much of his time to the advancement of learning. He expanded the national university, perfected examinations, encouraged literature, patronized the publication of mathematical and scientific treaties. and issued the first complete map of Vietnam. He also encouraged the spread of Confucian values throughout the kingdom by having temples of literature built in all the provinces. There, Confucius was venerated and classic works on Confucianism could be found. He also halted the building of any new Buddhist or Taoist temples and ordered that monks were not to be allowed to purchase any new land.

During his reign, Vietnamese Confucian scholarship had reached its golden era, with over 501 tiến sĩ (royal scholars) graduated, out of the total 2,896 tiến sĩ graduated from 1076 to 1911. In 1460, he ordered Confucian scholar Ngô Sĩ Liên (1401–1489) to compile an official national history book, and in 1479 the chronicle Đại Việt sử ký toàn thư was finished, and was presented to the emperor.

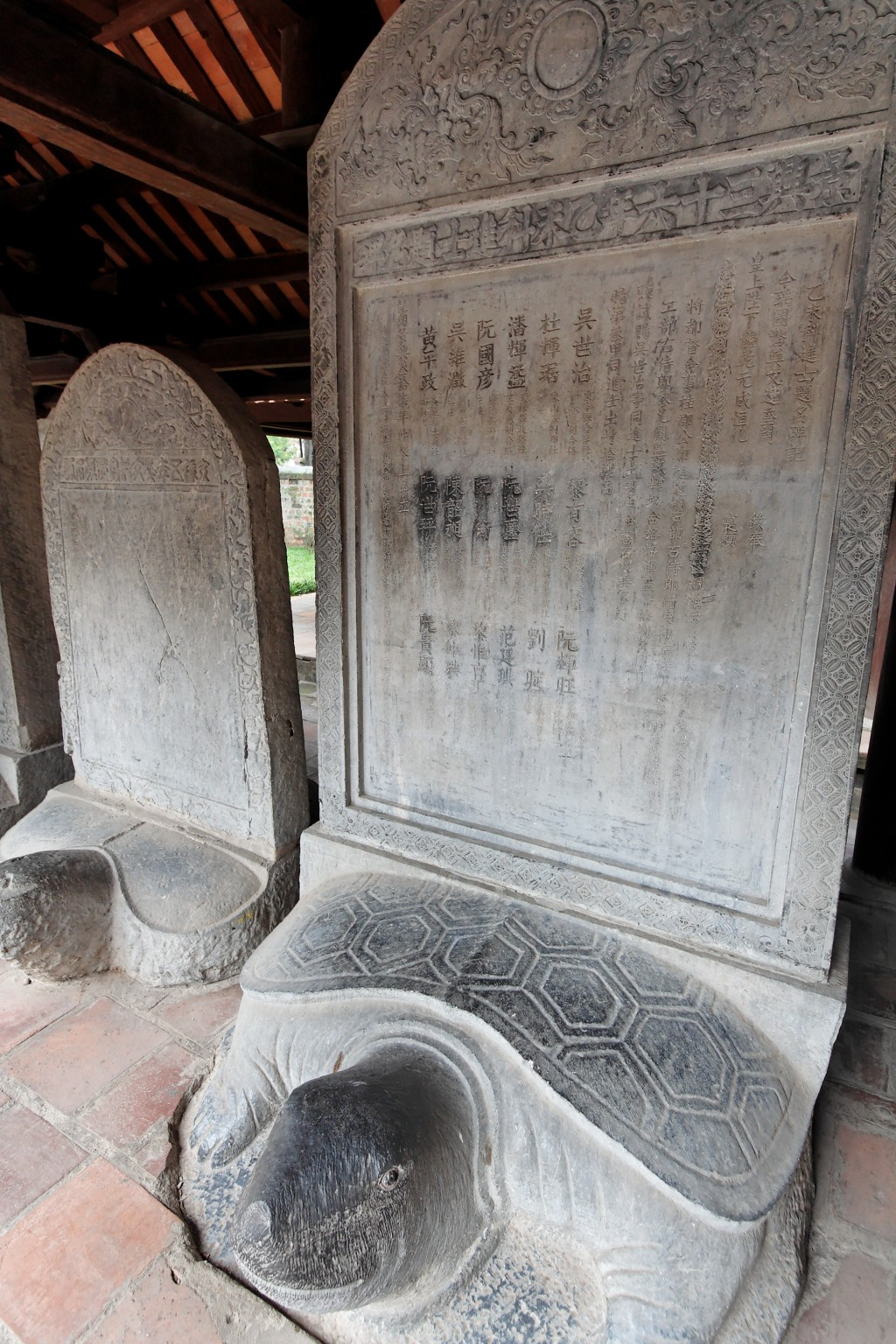
Stele dated 1478 inscribes names of graduated scholars

=== Foreign relations ===
==== Ming China ====
During the reign of Thánh Tông, two related events put the Ming tributary system to the test. The first was the final destruction of Champa in 1471, and the other, the invasion of Laos between 1479 and 1481. After destroying Champa in 1471, the Vietnamese informed the Ming court that the fall of Champa's ruling house had come about as "a result of civil war." In 1472, as Vietnamese pirates attacked Chinese and merchant ships in Hainan and the coast of Guangzhou, the Ming emperor called on Thánh Tông to end such activities. The court of Đại Việt denied its people would do such things.

Article 344 of the Nguyen dynasty code and Article 305 of the Le dynasty code both forbade self-castration and castration of Vietnamese men. Self-castration of Vietnamese men was banned by Lê Thánh Tông, the emperor, in 1464.

The Vietnamese under Emperor Le Thanh Tong cracked down on foreign contacts and enforced an isolationist policy. A large amount of trade between Guangdong (Leizhou Peninsula and Hainan) and Vietnam happened during this time. Early accounts recorded that the Vietnamese captured Chinese whose ships had blown off course and detained them. Young Chinese men were selected by the Vietnamese for castration to become eunuch slaves to the Vietnamese. It has been speculated by modern historians that Chinese who were captured and castrated by the Vietnamese were involved in regular trade between China and Vietnam instead of being blown off course, and that they were punished after a Vietnamese crackdown on trade with foreign countries.

A 1499 entry in the Ming Shilu recorded that thirteen Chinese men from Wenchang including a young man named Wu Rui were captured by the Vietnamese after their ship was blown off course while traveling from Hainan to Guangdong's Qin subprefecture (Qinzhou), after which they ended up near the coast of Vietnam, in the 1460s, during the Chenghua Emperor's rule (1464–1487). Twelve of them were enslaved to work as agricultural laborers, while the youngest Chinese man, Wu Rui (吳瑞) was selected by the Vietnamese court for castration since he was the only young man in among the thirteen and he became a eunuch at the Vietnamese imperial palace in Thang Long for nearly one fourth of a century. After years of serving the Vietnamese as a eunuch slave in the palace, he was promoted to a position with real power after the death of the Vietnamese ruler in 1497 to a military position in northern Vietnam as military superintendent since his service in the palace was apparently valued by the Vietnamese. However, the Lạng Sơn guard soldier Dương Tam tri (Yang Sanzhi; 楊三知) told him of an escape route back to China and Wu Rui escaped to Longzhou after walking for 9 days through the mountains. The local ethnic minority Tusi chief Wei Chen took him into custody, overruling objections from his family who wanted to send him back to Vietnam. Vietnam found out about his escape and sent an agent to buy Wu Rui back from Wei Chen with 100 Jin in payment since they were scared that Wu Rui would reveal Vietnamese state secrets to China. Wei Chen planned to sell him back to the Vietnamese but told them the amount they were offering was too little and demanded more however before they could agree on a price, Wu was rescued by the Pingxiang magistrate Li Guangning and then was sent to Beijing to work as a eunuch in the Ming palace at the Directorate of Ceremonial (silijian taijian 司禮監太監). The Đại Việt sử ký toàn thư records that in 1467 in An Bang province of Dai Viet (now Quảng Ninh Province) a Chinese ship blew off course onto the shore. The Chinese were detained and not allowed to return to China as ordered by Le Thanh Tong. This incident may be the same one where Wu Rui was captured.

Several Malay envoys from the Malacca sultanate were attacked and captured in 1469 by Vietnamese navy as they were returning to Malacca from China. The Vietnamese enslaved and castrated the young from among the captured.

A 1472 entry in the Ming Shilu reported that some Chinese from Nanhai escaped back to China after their ship had been blown off course into Vietnam, where they had been forced to serve as soldiers in Vietnam's military. The escapees also reported that they found out that more than 100 Chinese men remained captives in Vietnam after they were caught and castrated by the Vietnamese after their ships were blown off course into Vietnam in other incidents. The Chinese Ministry of Revenue responded by ordering Chinese civilians and soldiers to stop going abroad to foreign countries. These 100 men were taken prisoner around the same time as Wu Rui and the historian Leo K. Shin believes all of them may have been involved in illegal trade instead of being blown off course by wind. The over 100 Chinese men who were castrated and made into eunuchs by the Vietnamese remained captives in Vietnam when the incident was reported. Both the incidents of the young Chinese man Wu Rui and the more than 100 Chinese men being castrated and used as eunuchs point to possible involvement in trade according to historians John K. Whitmore and Tana Li which was then suppressed by the Vietnamese government instead of them really being blown off course by the wind. China's relations with Vietnam during this period were marked by the punishment of prisoners by castration.

==== Champa ====
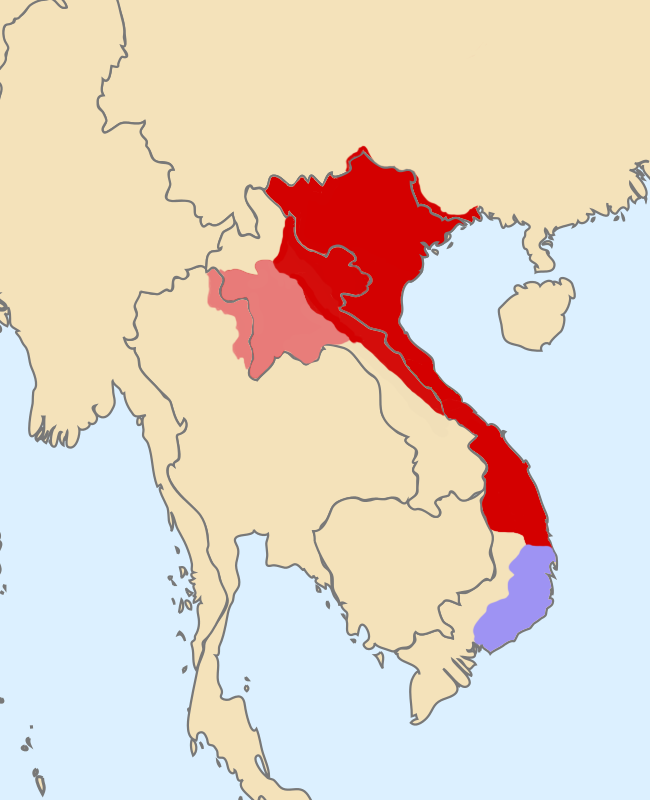
The kingdom of Đại Việt during the reign of Lê Thánh Tông

In 1470, a Cham army numbered 100,000 under king Maha Sajan arrived and besieged the Vietnamese garrison at Huế. The local commander sent appeals to Hanoi for help. Champa was defeated and the balance of power between the Cham and the Vietnamese for more than 500 years came to an end. The Ming annals recorded that in 1485 that "Champa is a distant and dangerous place, and Annam is still employing troops there."

==== Laos and Burma ====
Map shows the Vietnamese conquest and immigration to the south (Nam tiến).

Back in 1448, the Vietnamese had annexed the land of Muang Phuan in what is today the Plain of Jars in northeastern Laos, and Thánh Tông made that territory a prefecture of Đại Việt in 1471. Began in 1478, Thánh Tông felt it was the time to take his revenge on King Chakkaphat of Laos, preparing his army along the Annamite border in preparation for an invasion. Around the same time a white elephant had been captured and brought to King Chakkaphat. The elephant being a potent symbol of kingship was common throughout Southeast Asia, and Thánh Tông requested the animal's hair to be brought as a gift to the Đại Việt court. The request was seen as an affront, and according to legend a box filled with dung was sent instead. Thánh Tông also realized that Laos was expanding its authority over Tai peoples who had previously acknowledged Vietnamese suzerainty and had regularly paid tribute to Đại Việt. Thus, the campaigns to reassert Dai Viet's authority over the Tai tribes led to the invasion of Laos.

In fall 1479, Thánh Tông led an army of 180,000 men marched westward, attacked Muang Phuan, Lan Xang and Nan. Luang Phabang was captured and the Laotian ruler Chakkaphat was killed. His forces pushed further to the upper Irrawaddy River, around Kengtung in modern-day Myanmar. In 1482 Momeik borrowed troops of Dai Viet to invade Hsenwi and Lan Na. The Dai Viet forces suffered a defeat after facing Lan Xang-Lanna allied forces, which resulted in their troops diminishing. By November 1484, Thanh Tong and his forces had withdrawn back to Dai Viet. According to the Ming Shilu, in 1488 Burmese Ava embassy in China complained about Dai Viet's incursion into its territory. In the next year (1489) the Ming court sent envoys to admonish Dai Viet to stop.

==== Other regional powers and pirates ====
According to the Ming Shilu, Thánh Tông led ninety thousand troops to invade Lan Xang but was chased by the troops of the Malacca Sultanate, who killed thirty thousand Vietnamese soldiers. In 1485, envoys of Champa, Lan Xang, Melaka, Ayutthaya, and Java arrived Dai Viet. In 1470 he sent an anti-pirate expedition in the Gulf of Tonkin, secured the maritime transit. Also in 1475, pirates from Ryukyu Islands and Champa raided the port of Quy Nhơn. In 1480 a battle occurred on the Vietnamese coast between Vietnamese and a shipwrecked Ryukyuan ship. The Ming received a message requesting aid by Lan Song in 1481 against the Vietnamese invasion. Lê Thánh Tông claimed as tributaries the countries of Melaka, Java, Siam, Laos and Champa in "The Regulations concerning Tribute Missions from Vassals to the Imperial Capital" (Chư phiên sứ thần triều cống kinh quốc lệ) in 1485. The Tusi system was used to rule "barbarian" ethnic minorities in peripheral and mountain border areas.

=== As a poet ===
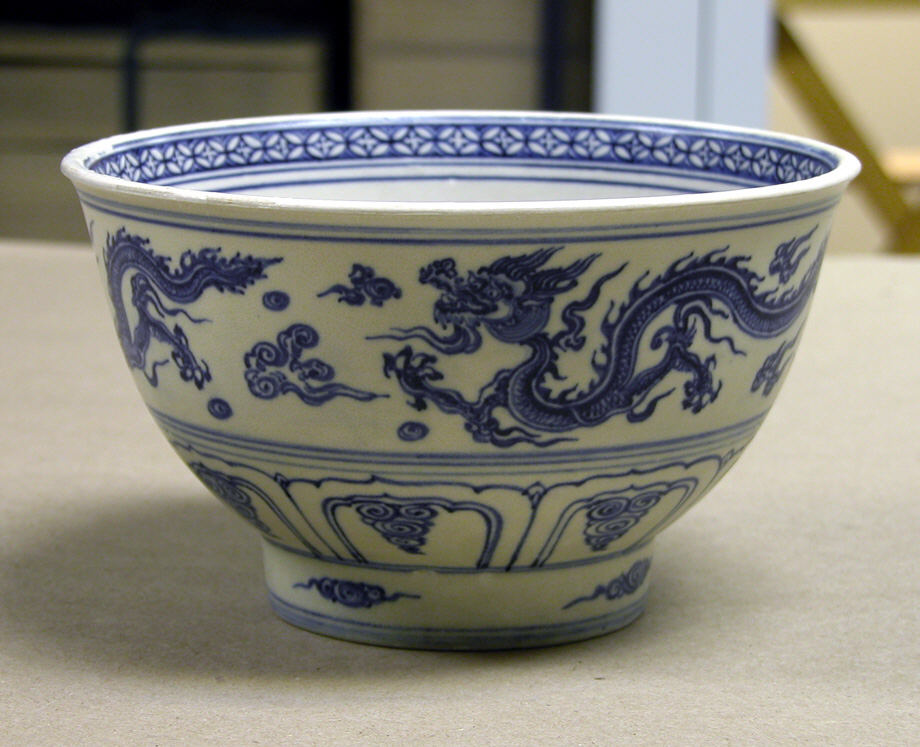
Blue and white bowl with dragon decoration, during Lê Thánh Tông's years (1460–1497). Metropolitan Museum of Art

A group of 28 poets were formally recognized by the court (the Tao Dan). Lê Thánh Tông himself was a poet and some of his poems have survived. He wrote the following at the start of his campaign against the Champa:

One hundred thousand officers and men,
Start out on a distant journey.
Falling on the sails, the rain

Softens the sounds of the army.

== Family ==
- Father: Lê Thái Tông
- Mother: Empress Quang Thuc Ngo Thi Ngoc Dao (光淑文皇后吳氏; 1421 – 1496)
- Consort(s) and their Respective Issue(s):
1. Empress Huy Gia (Empress Truong Lac) Nguyễn Thị Hằng of Nguyen Clan (徽嘉皇后阮氏; 1441 – 1505)
  1. Crown Prince Le Tranh, so Emperor Lê Hiến Tông
2. Empress Nhu Huy of Phung clan (柔徽皇后馮氏; 1444 – 1489)
  1. Prince Le Tan, father of Emperor Lê Tương Dực
3. Imperial Consort Minh of Pham clan (Phạm Minh phi, 明妃范氏; 1448 - 1498):
  1. Prince Le Tung
  2. Princess Ý Đức Lê Oánh Ngọc (雷懿公主黎莹玉)
  3. Princess Lan Minh Lê Lan Khuê (兰明公主黎兰圭; 1470 – 14??)
4. Imperial Consort Kinh of Nguyen clan (敬妃阮氏; 1444 – 1485)
  1. Princess Minh Kinh Lê Thụy Hoa (明敬公主黎瑞华)
5. Consort Nguyen thi (貴妃阮氏)
  1. Prince Le Thoan
6. Lady Nguyen (修容阮氏)
7. Lady Nguyen (才人阮氏; 1444 - 1479)

Lê Thánh Tông may have had Cham women as concubines, dancers and singers in his court.

== Ancestry ==
Ancestry of Emperor Lê Thánh Tông

Lê Đinh
Lê Khoáng (1350–1402)
Nguyễn Quách
Lê Lợi (1385–1433)
Trịnh Ngọc Thương
Lê Nguyên Long (1423–1442)
Phạm Thị Ngọc Trần (1386–1425)
Lê Hạo (1442–1497)
Ngô Kinh
Ngô Từ 1370–1453
Ngô Thị Ngọc Dao
Đinh Thị Ngọc Kế

== See also ==
- List of Vietnamese monarchs
- Lê dynasty

Preceded by Lê Nghi Dân	Emperor of Đại Việt (ruled from 1460 to 1497); 1442–1497	Succeeded by Lê Hiến Tông
