= Lê Thái Tông =

Lê Thái Tông 黎太宗
- Emperor of Đại Việt

Emperor of Đại Việt
- Reign: 20 October 1433 – 7 September 1442 (8 years, 322 days)
- Predecessor: Lê Lợi
- Successor: Lê Nhân Tông
- Born: 20 November 1423; Lam Sơn, Jiaozhi Province, Ming China (present-day Thọ Xuân, Thanh Hoá, Vietnam)
- Died: 8 August 1442 (aged 18); Lệ Chi Viên, Gia Định county
- Issue: Lê Nhân Tông, Lê Nghi Dân, Lê Thánh Tông
Names
- Lê Nguyên Long (黎元龍)
Era name and dates
- Thiệu Bình (紹平): 1434–1439; Đại Bảo (大寶): 1440–1442
Posthumous name
- Kế Thiên Thể Đạo Hiển Đức Thánh Công Khâm Minh Văn Tư Anh Duệ Triết Chiêu Hiến Kiến Trung Văn Hoàng đế (繼天體道顯德功欽明文思英睿仁哲昭憲建中文皇帝)
Temple name
- Thái Tông (太宗)
- Dynasty: Later Lê dynasty
- Father: Lê Thái Tổ
- Mother: Phạm Thị Ngọc Trần

Lê Thái Tông (黎太宗 22 December 1423 – 28 August 1442), birth name Lê Nguyên Long (黎元龍), was the second Emperor of the Lê dynasty of Đại Việt from 1433 until his death in 1442.

== Biography ==
Lê Thái Tông was the second son of Lê Lợi. Although his mother died when he was at a young age, he was considered as bright and capable as his father was. When Lê Lợi became sick in 1433, he summoned his closest advisors (Lê Sát, Trịnh Khả, Pham Van Sao, Nguyễn Trãi, Tran Nguyen Han, and Le Ngan) to name Lê Thái Tông as his heir to the throne. At the time Lê Thái Tông was only ten years old. Upon Lê Lợi's death, Lê Sát assumed the regency of Vietnam.

Lê Sát ruled Vietnam more for himself than for the young emperor. He eliminated many of his rivals by various means and tried to further solidify his power base within the government. Lê Thái Tông became increasingly unhappy with his regent's actions and sought support from rival factions. He struck an alliance with Trịnh Khả, who had been exiled to a distant locality due to not getting along well with Lê Sát. One of his first acts upon officially taking the throne in 1438 was to bring Trịnh Khả back and installed him as the head of the Palace Guards - against Lê Sát's strong objections. A few months later, Lê Sát was accused of lacking in virtue and usurping the power which belonged solely to the emperor. The erstwhile Grand Chancellor was then arrested, tried and executed shortly after.

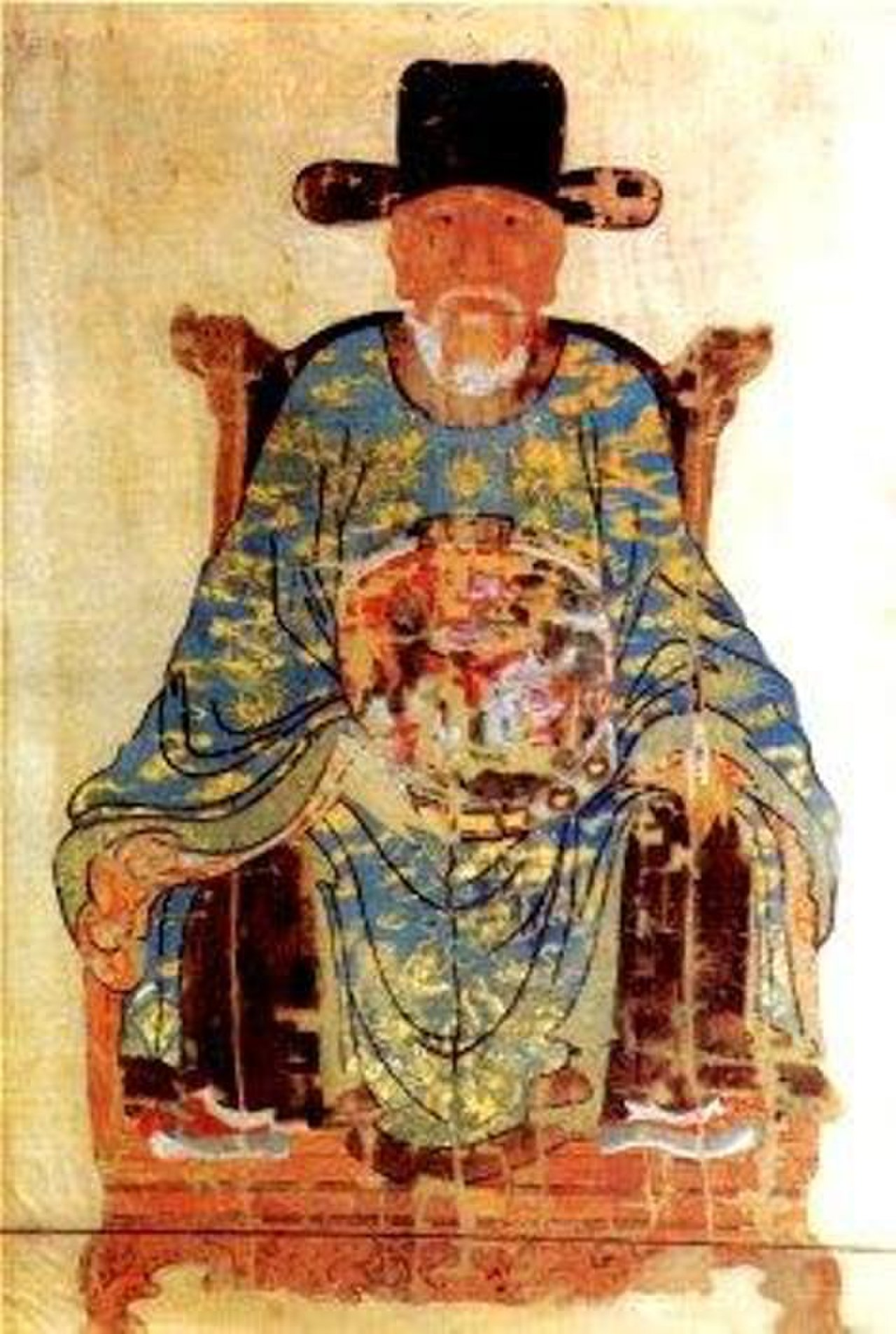
The silk painting of Nguyễn Trãi (15th century)

In spring 1440, an ethnic chief named Hà Tông Lai rebelled in Thu Vật sub-prefecture in Tuyên Quang (Northwest Đại Việt). Lê Thái Tông launched and personally led a campaign against Hà Tông Lai. After only one week of fighting, the young emperor emerged victorious as Hà Tông Lai was beheaded and his son Tông Mậu was arrested. Not long after that, in 1440 another ethnic chief named Nghiễm broke loyalty with the court and gathered troops in the Gia Hưng prefecture, also in the nation's northwest area. Lê Thái Tông again personally led troops to the northwest. The imperial armies defeated Nghiễm, who subsequently presented the emperor with a buffalo as a clue of submission. That satisfied the emperor enough and he ordered the army to retreat, partly due to the fact that the weather was excessively hot causing difficulties to his troops.

In the early part of 1441, Đại Việt's official history recorded that Nghiễm again took arms against the court. Lê Thái Tông made a third campaign to the northwest with his troops. Under the direct command of the emperor, the imperial hosts defeated a Laotian army having come to assist Nghiễm. They also captured two of Nghiễm's sons Sinh Tượng and Chàng Đồng. The campaign resulted in Nghiễm permanently submissing to the authority of the imperial court. Those military successes caused Thái Tông to be assessed by Vũ Quỳnh, high-ranking minister and court annalist during the reign of Lê Tương Dực, as a "heroic emperor".

Although Lê Thái Tông proved to be a capable emperor, his one flaw was his desire for women, and the imperial court was soon filled with intrigue as he shifted his affections from one concubine to another. His first wife was the daughter of Lê Sát, his second wife was the daughter of Le Ngan, his third wife was Duong thi Bi, who gave birth to his first son Nghi Dân. He soon transferred his affections to Ngo Thi Ngoc Dao and Nguyễn Thị Anh. This last young woman gave birth to his third son (and immediate heir) Lê Nhân Tông. However, Ngo Thi Ngoc Dao would give birth to his most widely known son, Lê Thánh Tông.

== Death ==
On 4 August 1442, the emperor paid a visit to the eastern part of the country and paid a visit to Lệ Chi Viên, or Lychee Garden belonging to the Confucian scholar Nguyễn Trãi, located in Đại Lai, Gia Bình, Bắc Ninh Province.

A concubine of Trãi, Lady Nguyễn Thị Lộ, was chosen to tend to the emperor during the royal stay. The young emperor became very sick suddenly and quickly died. The next morning Trãi was accused of killing the emperor, and together with members of his family was executed.

In 1464, Emperor Lê Thánh Tông issued a royal proclamation to vindicate Trãi, saying that he was wholly innocent in the death of Lê Thái Tông and praised him by stating that “Trai's spirit shines like a star". The surviving son of Trãi, Nguyễn Anh Vũ was made an officer for the Royal Court.

Despite the vindication Trãi was considered guilty by some historians and scholars, because of his relationships with Lady Nguyễn Thị Lộ. On the basis that killing a emperor is an unforgivable sin, Lê Quý Đôn in the 18th century stated that Nguyễn Trãi should not be considered as a meritorious official despite his great contributions for country and the royal court during reign of Emperor Lê Thái Tổ.

Some reports by Ngô Sĩ Liên, Phan Huy Chú and Quốc sử quán (National History School under Nguyễn dynasty) also wrote that Trãi might be innocent in the death of the emperor but not Lady Nguyễn Thị Lộ. Other scholars suggest that Lady Nguyễn Thị Lộ may have been an innocent victim of Nguyễn Thị Anh the emperor's wife. Other scholars suggest that the emperor became sick and died of natural causes.

== Family ==
- Father: Le Thai To
- Mother: Queen Cung Tu Pham Thi Ngoc Tran 范氏玉陳
- Consorts and their Respective Issue(s):
1. Queen Tuyen Tu Nguyễn Thị Anh ( 1422 - 1459)
  1. Crown Prince Le Bang Co, later Emperor Lê Nhân Tông
2. Queen Quang Thuc Ngo Thi Ngoc Dao (1421 - 1469)
  1. Prince Le Tu Thanh, later Emperor Lê Thánh Tông
3. Imperial Consort Le Ngoc Dao of Le clan
4. Consort Le Nhat Le of Le clan
5. Consort Duong Thi Bi
  1. Crown Prince Le Nghi Dan
6. Lady Bui of Bui clan
  1. Prince Le Khac Xuong

== See also ==
- List of Vietnamese dynasties

== Notes ==
Preceded by Lê Lợi	King of Vietnam (ruled only from 1438 to 1442); 1433–1442	Succeeded by Lê Nhân Tông
