= Nguyễn Thị Anh =

- Born: 1422; Bố Vệ commune, Đông Sơn district, Thiệu Thiên prefect, Thanh Hoa town, Vietnam
- Died: 4 October 1459 (aged 36–37); Đông Kinh, Vietnam
- Spouse: Lê Thái Tông
- Issue: Lê Nhân Tông
Posthumous name
- Tuyên Từ Nhân Ý Chiêu Túc hoàng thái hậu (宣慈仁懿昭肅皇太后)

Nguyễn Thị Anh (chữ Hán: 阮氏英, 1422 – 1459), regnal name Tuyên Từ empress dowager (Vietnamese: Tuyên Từ hoàng thái hậu) was a concubine of emperor Lê Thái Tông, and later empress dowager of Lê dynasty as the mother of the emperor Lê Nhân Tông. She was the first incumbent empress dowager in Vietnamese history and the only empress dowager of the Lê dynasty, to serve as regent and handle state affairs on behalf of the Emperor. She was official regent of Đại Việt about 1442 - 1453 during her son's minority, and effective head of state until her death in 1459 from the coup of Lê Nghi Dân.

== Royal concubine consort ==
Nguyễn Thị Anh was born in 1422 in Bố Vệ commune, Đông Sơn district (present day Hạc Thành ward), Thanh Hóa during the fourth Northern domination era. Nguyễn Thị Anh was a beautiful woman of noble birth. In 1440, she became a consort of the young king Le Thai Tong at the same time as Ngô Thị Bính. They both attracted the King's attention and both gave birth to sons shortly before the king, Lê Thái Tông, died in 1442. Although the king had an older son, Nghi Dân, that boy's mother was not from a noble family and he was passed over, instead the kingship was given to Nguyễn Thị Anh's son, now called Lê Nhân Tông.

== Regent ==
At the time of his elevation to the kingship of Annam, Lê Nhân Tong was just an infant (just over one year old). By tradition, the infant king's mother had great power and she was also officially named the regent on behalf of her son. In reality, the real power behind the throne was Trinh Kha, a close friend and senior advisor to Lê Lợi.

Together, Trinh Kha and Nguyen Thi Anh managed to rule Vietnam reasonably well, though there was some friction. This friction grew as they clashed over how the king should be educated and who really got to make decisions in the government. In 1451, Nguyễn Thị Anh ordered the execution of Trinh Kha and his eldest son. The reason for this is lost and just two years later, Trịnh Khả was officially pardoned and his family was given new lands.

== De facto ruler ==
Nguyễn Thị Anh's son, Lê Nhân Tông was officially given the powers of government in 1453 even though he was only 12 years old. This was unusual and seems to have made little real difference, the empress dowager ruled while the other noble families acted as a brake on her power.

The government did not do very much during this time, one later Vietnamese historian said this was a peaceful, harmonious time. The official court history written some 30 years later said it was a time of calamity for Vietnam and that for a woman to rule was as unnatural as "a hen crowing at daybreak".

In 1459, the oldest son of Lê Thái Tông, Nghi Dân, staged a coup. He and some 100 men secretly entered the palace late in October and killed the king. According to "The Development of the Le Government in Fifteenth Century Vietnam" of John K. Whitmore, the next day after the coup, Nguyễn Thị Anh, facing certain death at the hands of Nghi Dân's men, allowed herself to be killed by a loyal servant.

The rule by Nguyễn Thị Anh was far from a disaster for Annam but equally, not much happened. Certainly there was a marked contrast between her rule, and the rule of her husband's own son, Le Thanh Tong.
