= Nguyễn Hữu Thị Nhàn =

Nguyễn Hữu Thị Nhàn (1870–1935), was an empress dowager of Vietnam between 1916 and 1933. She was the honorary grandmother of emperor Bảo Đại of the Nguyễn dynasty. She was the concubine of emperor Đồng Khánh. She had never been empress consort, but was given the title of empress dowager in her capacity as the grandmother of the emperor.
