= Lê Lợi =

Founding Emperor of the Later Lê dynasty

Lê Thái Tổ 黎太祖
- Emperor of Đại Việt
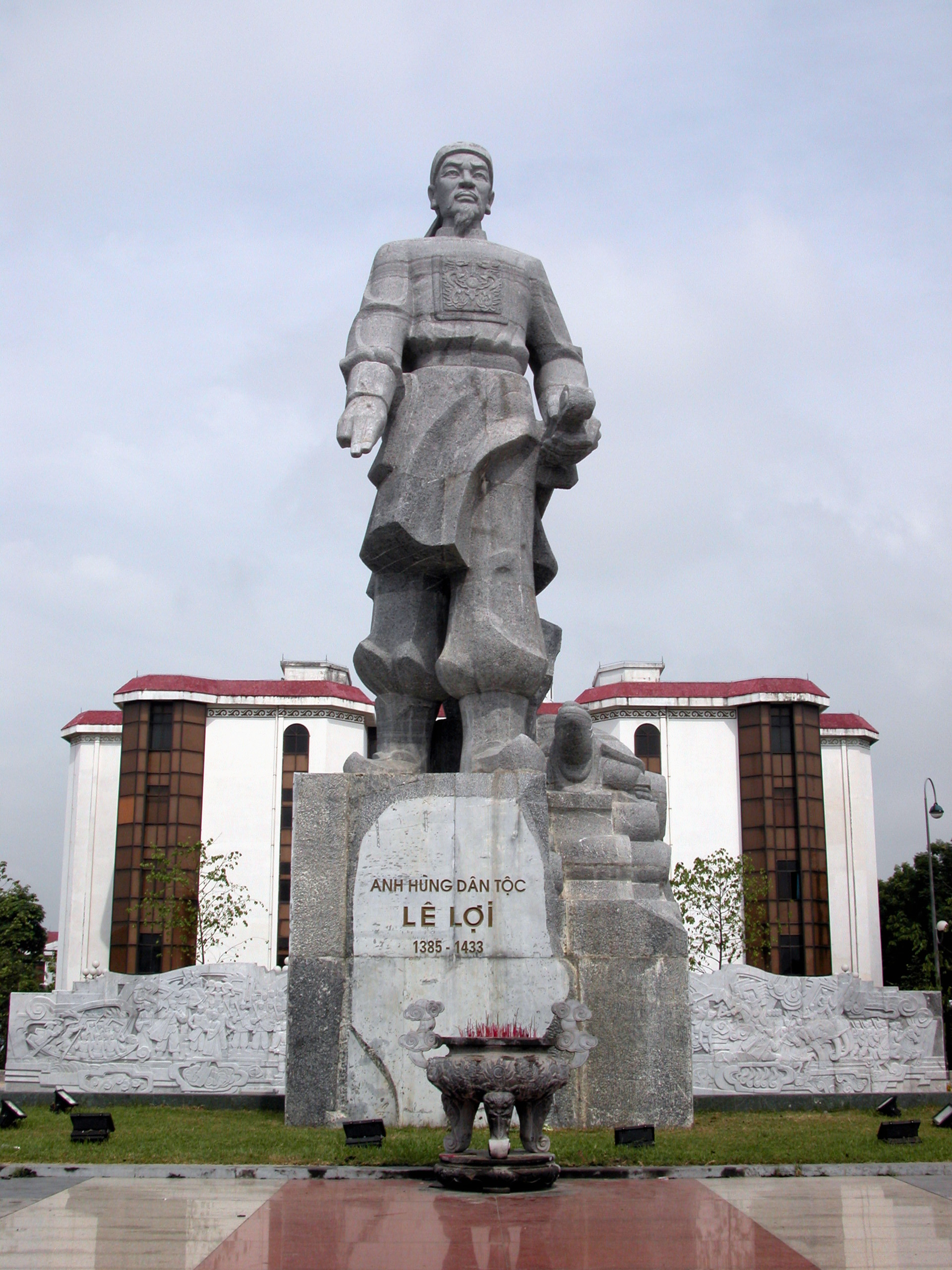
- Lê Lợi statue in front of the Municipal Hall of Thanh Hóa Province, the place of his birth

Emperor of Đại Việt
- Reign: 29 April 1428 – 5 October 1433 (5 years, 159 days)
- Predecessor: Dynasty established
- Successor: Lê Thái Tông
- Born: 10 September 1385; Lam Sơn, Thanh Hóa
- Died: 5 October 1433 (aged 48); Đông Kinh, Đại Việt
- Burial: Vĩnh Tomb, Lam Sơn
- Spouses: Trịnh Thị Ngọc Lữ; Phạm Thị Ngọc Trần
- Issue: Lê Tư Tề; Lê Thái Tông
Names
- Lê Lợi (黎利)
Era name and dates
- Thuận Thiên (順天): 1428–1433
Posthumous name
- Thống Thiên Khải Vận Thánh Đức Thần Công Duệ Văn Anh Vũ Khoan Minh Dũng Trí Hoàng Nghĩa Chí Minh Đại Hiếu Cao Hoàng đế (統天啟運聖德神功睿文英武寬明勇智弘義至明大孝高皇帝)
Temple name
- Thái Tổ (太祖)
- Dynasty: Lê dynasty
- Father: Lê Khoáng
- Mother: Trịnh Thị Ngọc Thương

Lê Lợi (Vietnamese: [le˧ lɤj˨˩ˀ], chữ Hán: 黎利; 10 September 1385 – 5 October 1433), also known by his temple name as Lê Thái Tổ (黎太祖) and by his royal title Bình Định vương (平定王; "King of Pacification"), was a Vietnamese rebel leader who founded the Later Lê dynasty and became the first monarch of the restored kingdom of Đại Việt following the conquest of Đại Ngu by the Ming dynasty. In 1418, Lê Lợi and his followers rose up against Ming rule. He was known for his effective guerrilla tactics, including constantly moving his camps and using small bands of irregulars to ambush the larger Ming forces. In 1427, Lê Lợi's resistance movement successfully drove the Ming armies out of Vietnam and restored Vietnamese independence. Lê Lợi is among the most famous figures of Vietnamese history and often considered one of its greatest national heroes.

== Background ==
From the mid-1300s, Đại Việt faced serious troubles that damaged much of the kingdom. The fourteenth century ecological breakdown led to a social crisis as the ruling Trần dynasty weakened. Even in the capital, Thăng Long, turmoil broke out in 1369–70, provoking a princely coup and a short, bloody civil war. From the south, the Chams under Chế Bồng Nga repeatedly fought against Đại Việt, and even sacked Thăng Long in 1371. In 1377 Champa defeated and killed Đại Việt's emperor Trần Duệ Tông in a battle near Vijaya, then marched north and against sacked Thăng Long four more times from 1378 to 1383. The repeated destruction of a radical intellectual and reformer, Hồ Quý Ly (c. 1336 – 1408). In 1399 Hồ Quý Ly deposed the Trần royal family and declared himself as ruler of Đại Việt. This provoked a response from the Ming dynasty, who invaded Vietnam under the pretext of restoring the deposed Trần dynasty. In 1406 215,000 Chinese troops crossed the border commanded by generals Zhang Fu and Mu Sheng; they quickly defeated Hồ Quý Ly's army, conquered Vietnam, and renamed the country Jiaozhi.

The Ming Chinese began building up their colonial administration in Jiaozhi Province, encouraging the Ming Confucian ideology, bureaucratic and Classic Chinese study to the local people, forced the Vietnamese to wear Chinese clothes and adopt Chinese culture. The Ming government enjoyed some support from the Vietnamese, at least in the capital of Thăng Long, but their efforts to assert control in the surrounding countryside were met with stiff resistance. A general popular dissatisfaction with the colonial arrangement seems clear. Between 1415 and 1424, 31 uprising and revolt leaders against the Ming emerged in Lạng Giang, Nghệ An, Hanoi, Ninh Kiều, Lạng Sơn, and other prefecture capitals where the Ming troops were stationed.

== Early life ==
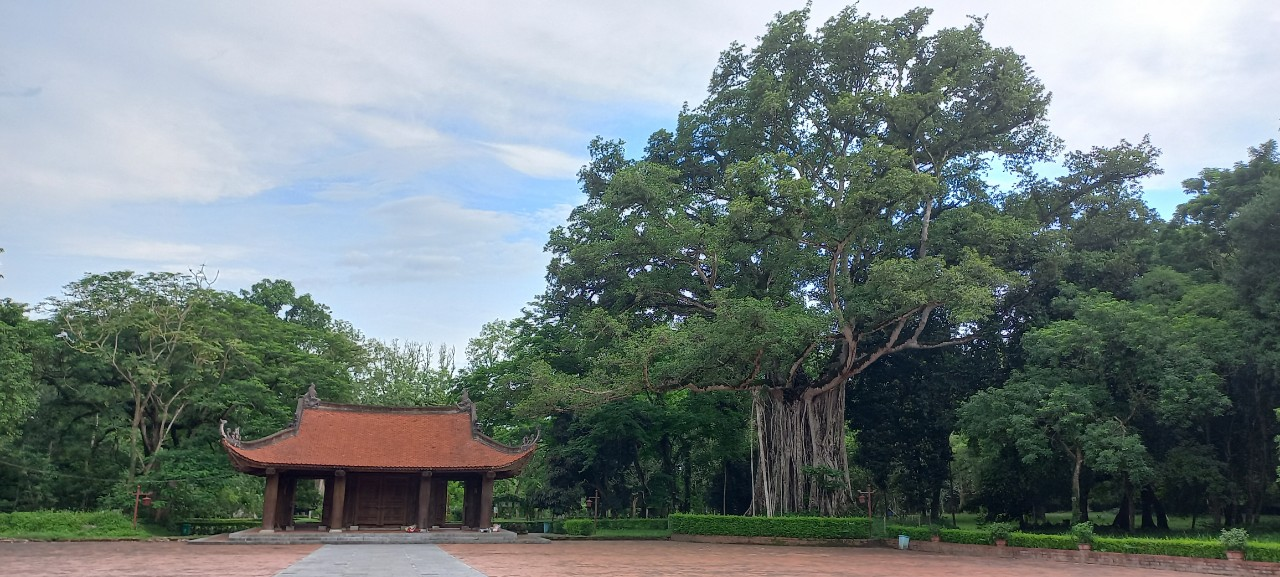
Lam Kinh, original village of the Le family

Lê Lợi was born on the sixth day of August, 1385 in Lam Giang village, Lam Sơn, Thanh Hóa province to a noble family and he was the youngest among three sons. His father, Lê Khoáng, was a wealthy Vietnamese aristocrat nobleman/land owner in the village, although there is some evidence to suggest his family was Mường in origin. There has also been hypotheses suggesting that Lê Lợi was a Mường military leader. However, recent genealogical studies of the Lê family have discovered that the primogenitor of Lê Lợi is Lê Mỗi, who is from Bái Đô (now part of Xuân Bái commune, Thọ Xuân district). Lê Mỗi had five children, and Lê Hối is his second son who is Lê Lợi's paternal great-grandfather. Bái Đô is an area that was historically never settled by Mường people. Regarding Lê Lợi's maternal lineage, the maternal side also originated from Kinh people who migrated to develop the Thủy Chú region. Therefore, it is confirmed that Lê Lợi is of Kinh ethnicity, not Mường. The Lê/Lê Duy clan was the powerful clan in Lam Sơn for hundreds of years. The area of Lam Sơn, Thanh Hóa back then in the late 14th century was a mixed region with various ethnic groups such as Vietnamese, Mường, Hmong and Tai villagers.

During Lê Lợi's early adult time, the Ming invasion and occupation suddenly happened. During two Trần princes's revolts against the Chinese rules (1408 – 1414), Lê Lợi joined the revolt as nominally in charge of the royal guard. He was arrested and imprisoned by the Chinese from 1413 to 1415 after the Trần princes were defeated, and other revolts were suppressed in 1411 and 1420. After his release, he worked as a tutor officer and translator for the Ming colonial administrator in Ngã Lạc county, Lạng Sơn (modern-day Bình Gia District, Lạng Sơn Province). He then became involved in a feud with a neighboring strongman who denounced him as a rebel to the Ming. The Ming chased him back to his village. It was widely reported that when Lê Lợi's daughter was nine years old, a Chinese eunuch, Ma Ji (fl. 1410–1427) had taken her away from her parents and sent her into Yongle's harem. Yongle's grand secretary Yang Shiqi noted that Zhang Fu time and again criticized Ma Ji's wanton behavior in Jiaozhi. Although Ma Ji did the bidding of His Majesty, his conduct provided the catalyst that brought the new uprising. The Chinese also said that Lê Lợi escaped to Laos and Cambodia several times. In early 1418, Lê Lợi again raised the flag of resistance at his home village of Lam Sơn, declaring himself Bình Định vương (平定王, Prince of Pacification).

== Revolt against Ming rule ==
=== Lam Sơn revolt (1418–1423) ===
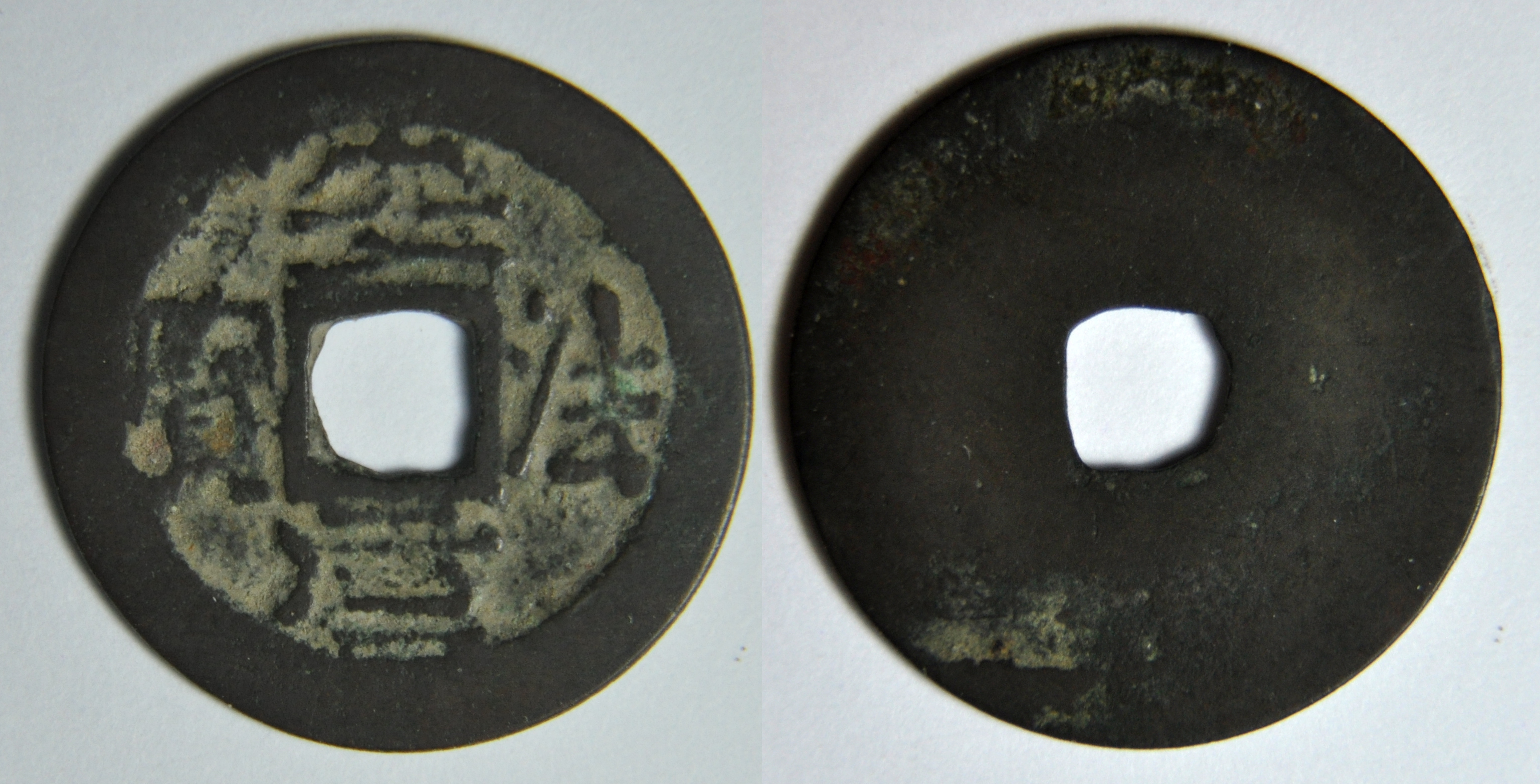
Coins issued by the Lam Sơn's National Liberation army

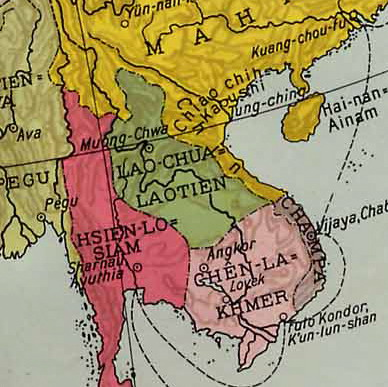
Jiaozhi Province (northern Vietnam) when it was under Ming occupation (1407–1427)

Lê Lợi

Vietnamese name
- Vietnamese: Lê Lợi
- Hán-Nôm: 黎利

Lê Lợi began his revolt against the Ming Chinese on the day after Tết (New Year) February 1418. He was supported by several prominent families from his native Thanh Hóa, most famously were the Trịnh and the Nguyễn families. Initially, Lê Lợi campaigned on the basis of restoring the Trần family to power. A relative of the Trần emperor was chosen as the figurehead of the revolt but within a few years, the Trần pretender was removed and the unquestioned leader of the revolt was Lê Lợi himself.

- Temple name
- Vietnamese alphabet: Lê Thái Tổ
- Hán-Nôm: 黎太祖

From the start, the Ming had tried to ensure that local opposition forces would not obtain the new weapons technology, including the Chinese musket known as the magic handgun. The Yongle Emperor had ordered all firearms counted and well-guarded. The Ming occupying army of Jiaozhi consisted of 87,000 regulars, scattered in 39 citadels and towns in Northern Vietnam, but clustered in the Red River Delta areas. They also employed a significant number of local auxiliaries. Chinese armies had employed firearms before the fifteenth century, but they came to possess superior weapons from Annam during the Vietnamese campaigns of the early fifteenth century. They also captured one of the leading Vietnamese firearms experts, Hồ Nguyên Trừng (1374—1446), the eldest son of Hồ Quý Ly, who was charged with manufacturing their superior muskets and explosive weapons. The Artillery Camp was thus built around these Vietnamese firearm specialists, who instructed Ming soldiers under the supervision of palace eunuchs. The first record of firearm usage in Đại Việt was in 1390 when Vietnamese soldiers used cannons and killed the Cham king Chế Bồng Nga. Lê Lợi's Lam Son rebels employed firearms, copied in rebel-built arsenals from Ming weapons used against Hồ Quý Ly army ten years earlier.

When the Lam Son uprising took place, the Ming commanding officer was Marquis Li Bin, who stern attitude toward the Annamites of Jiaozhi and disregard for their sensibilities and political aspirations only intensified their hatred for the Chinese. In early 1418, Lê Lợi and his men successful managed and ambushed a Ming patrol column on the upper Chu River, near Lam Son but was then betrayed by a turncoat who showed Ming units a way to attack him by surprise from the rear. His partisan party scattered and he briefly went into hiding before regaining enough strength to ambush the Ming patrol and force it to withdraw. In 1419 Lê Lợi attacked and seized a Ming outpost near Lam Son held by a local noble who was working for the Chinese, and beheaded 300 enemies captured here. In the next year, Lê Lợi spent time marching around the western highlands to recruit more men. In late 1420, his force ambushed a Ming patrol. The Chinese marquis, Li Bin, responded by mobilizing Ming and local military forces to against him, but Lê Lợi defeated them, gained the control over Quan Hoa district on the upper Mã River.

In late 1421, a large Ming army marched to the Mã River valley to attack Lê Lợi and the Vietnamese rebels. A Laotian army with 30,000 men and 100 elephants from Lan Xang approached down the valley from the opposite direction. Lê Lợi was under the illusion that the Laotians were his allies. However, they sided with the Ming and joined the Chinese to laid siege on Lê Lợi. By the end of 1422, Lê Lợi was utterly defeated and sued for peace. In 1423, he was forced to return to Lam Son. The Ming army offered a peace treaty, in which Lê Lợi paid an indemnity with unspecified amounts of gold and silver in return for food, salt, rice, and farm implements. However, the Ming arrested the messenger Lê Trăn. This raised suspicion to Lê Lợi and he cancelled the peace pact.

=== Capture of Nghệ An ===
Within a month of taking the throne, Emperor Zhu Gaozhi (r. 1424–1425), Zhu Di's son and successor, issued a proclamation indicating a dramatic change of Ming policy in Jiaozhi. calling for "reform", he abolished the collection of commodities. In other initiatives, he moved to end Zheng He's voyages, and he downgraded the role of the military. He wanted to consolidate the core of what had been achieved by his father and grandfather but had no taste for costly adventures. He recalled Huang Fu from Jiaozhi and lowered the priority of holding that distant place. After only one year as emperor, Zhu Gaozhi died suddenly of a heart attack, but his son and successor, Zhu Zhanji (r. 1425–1435), continued his father policies.

In late 1424, news of the new emperor's proclamation and of Huang Fu's recall prompted Lê Lợi to set out on a new trajectory. He returned the resistance movement as the rebel leader in the Thanh Hoa highlands. Lê Lợi rebuilt his partisan army, follow his comrade, Nguyễn Chích to march south through the mountains into Nghệ An, where they ambushed a Ming force in Quỳ Châu district. The Lam Son partisans advanced to Con Cuong district on the upper Cả River. By the end of 1424, Le Loi's rebels had forced the Ming army being clustered in Vinh, which is provincial capital of Nghệ An. Le Loi recruited thousands soldiers from ethnic minority in the highland west of the Cả River delta for his army. His forces then defeated an army of ethnic minority troops who had joined the Ming cause. Then they headed east down into the coastal lowlands of Nghệ An. He sought to convince the densely ethnic-Kinh population areas in Nghe An by demonstrating discipline and refraining from exactions.

In 1425, as the Ming court was preoccupied with the death of one emperor and the accession of another, Lê Lợi led armies both to the south and to the north. In the south, his soldiers under Trần Nguyên Hãn defeated a Ming army in modern Quảng Bình and then marched through modern Quảng Trị and Thừa Thiên, and gained control of the southern land. In the north, Lê Lợi's men captured a Ming supply fleet in northern Nghệ An, then pursued the Ming force in Thanh Hoa and besieged them at Tây Đô. Nguyễn Trãi, a Confucian scholar who was a comrade of Lê Lợi, helped him mapped the army's strategy and tactics.

By the end of 1425, Lê Lợi's Vietnamese rebels liberated all land from Thanh Hoa to the south, and besieged all the Ming forces in the region.

=== Pushing north ===
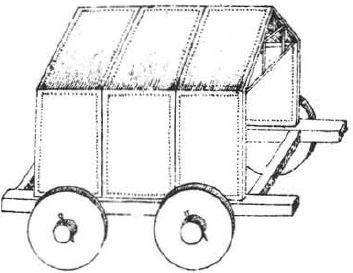
Illustration of primitive tank from Chinese book Wujing Zongyao

In 1425, the Ming Emperor Zhu Zhanji expressed his opinion that it would be better to restore the Trần dynasty and return to the old tributary relationship. In the next year, Zhang Fu requested permission to resume command of Ming Jiaozhi army to deal with the worsening situation there, the emperor refused. In 1426, Zhu Zhanji proclaimed a general amnesty and abolished all taxes in Jiaozhi except for land taxes to be paid in rice, needed to supply Ming garrisons.

In 1426, Lê Lợi sent his armies led by his generals, Trịnh Khả, Lý Triện, Đỗ Bí, Lưu Nhân Chú, Bùi Bị, Đinh Lễ and Nguyễn Xí through the mountains north of Tây Đô to emerge at the head of the Red River plain, threatening Dongguan and cutting it off from the road to Yunnan. When Ming soldiers were recalled from Vinh to reinforce Dongguan, Lê Lợi, leaving some troops to besiege Vinh, followed the Ming forces as they moved north, rallying thousands of men from Thanh Hoa as he went. Pushing into the Red River Delta he proclaimed as king a certain Trần Cảo, supposedly a Trần prince. Men and scholars from the Red River Delta began to join his army as he called for those who had favored the Ming to come to his side and arrested those who did not. The Chinese general, Wang Tong, at Dongguan as Huang Fu's replacement, was prepared to surrender, but local people who were loyal to Ming persuaded him to resist. Civilians in the Red River Delta welcomed and supported the Lam Son army where they came.

In early December 1426, Lý Triện and Đinh Lễ's 3,000 Vietnamese rebels achieved a surprise victory over the Ming army led by Wang Tong with about 30,000 Chinese soldiers were killed or captured in Tốt Động (32 km south of Hanoi) while countless horses, supplies, weapons, and so on fell into Vietnamese hands. Among these Ming troops were 510 soldiers armed with firearms, led by the regional military commander of the Firearms Battalion, Xie Rong, whom had been sent on May 8, 1426, by the Ming emperor to follow Wang Tong.

By 1427, captured northern and Muslim prisoners also furnished the Vietnamese with siege techniques, primitive tanks, flying horse carts, Muslim trebuchets (hui hui pao 回回砲), and another artillery piece that the Chinese called a "thousand-ball thunder cannon".

By the beginning of 1427, five major Ming strongholds were under siege. These were Dongguan and Tây Đô; Cổ Long, a fortress built to guard the southern entrance to the Red River delta in Y Yen district, near Vu Ban in Nam Định Province, on the road between Dongguan and Tây Đô; a fortress at Chí Linh, near Phả Lại, that guarded the eastern part of the Red River delta; and Xương Giang, a citadel at the modern city of Bắc Giang that guarded the route out of the Red River Delta to the northern border. All the Ming garrisons south of Tay Do had surrendered. Lê Lợi established his headquarters at Bồ Đề, in Gia Lâm district, directly across the Red River from Dongguan.

=== Final victories ===
In late March 1427, around 120,000 Chinese reinforcements led by Liu Sheng and Mu Sheng advanced into Jiaozhi from Yunnan and Guangxi; the army included 10,000 crack troops who had followed Zheng He on his expeditions.

At first, Lê Lợi commanded the residents be moved to Lạng Giang, Bắc Giang, Quy Hoa, Tuyên Quang to segregate Ming troops. He knew Liu Sheng kept the main forces, so he sent Le Sat, Le Nhan Chu, Le Van Linh, and Dinh Liet to wait at Chi Lang, and at the same time commanded Le Van An and Le Ly to take alternative forces to support. With Mu Sheng's forces, he knew Thanh was an experienced general and would be waiting for Liu Sheng's results before taking actions, so Lê Lợi commanded Pham Van Xao and Trinh Kha to be entrenched the entire time. In September, Liu Sheng's 90,000-strong army was defeated in Chi Lang, and he himself was executed shortly after.

Mu Sheng heard Liu Sheng was killed and beheaded so he got scared and ran away. Pham Van Xao and Trinh Kha followed, killed 10,000 soldiers, and arrested 1,000 units, including soldiers and horses.

Le Loi understood that Ming Jiaozhi was at its end. The Ming were unlikely to make any serious effort to reassert their control in Jiaozhi. By making Trần Cảo king, Lê Lợi satisfied the aim of restoring the Trần that had ostensibly led to the initial Ming intervention. Zhu Zhanji now eagerly wanted to terminate further intervention. With imperial forces under siege, Ming could not be idle. Maintaining the appearance of empire required efforts to reinforce or to rescue the besieged remnants of Jiaozhi.

After a six-month siege on the Ming-held citadel of Xương Giang, the citadel fell to Lê Lợi in October 1427, which ultimately ended the war. The Xuande Emperor of the Ming dynasty decided to withdraw his army from Northern Vietnam. After this final victory, the Vietnamese repatriated 86,640 Ming prisoners to China and confiscated all their weapons. The defeat is considered by historian Ben Kiernan as the greatest policy disaster suffered by the early Ming empire. China would not again invade its southern neighbor for 360 years. According to a Ming report, Lê Lợi's chief eunuch, Le Bi (黎秘), as well as 10,000 Vietnamese were killed after Ming forces crushed and defeated their invasion in 1427 of a Chinese town in Guangxi.

== Restoring Đại Việt ==
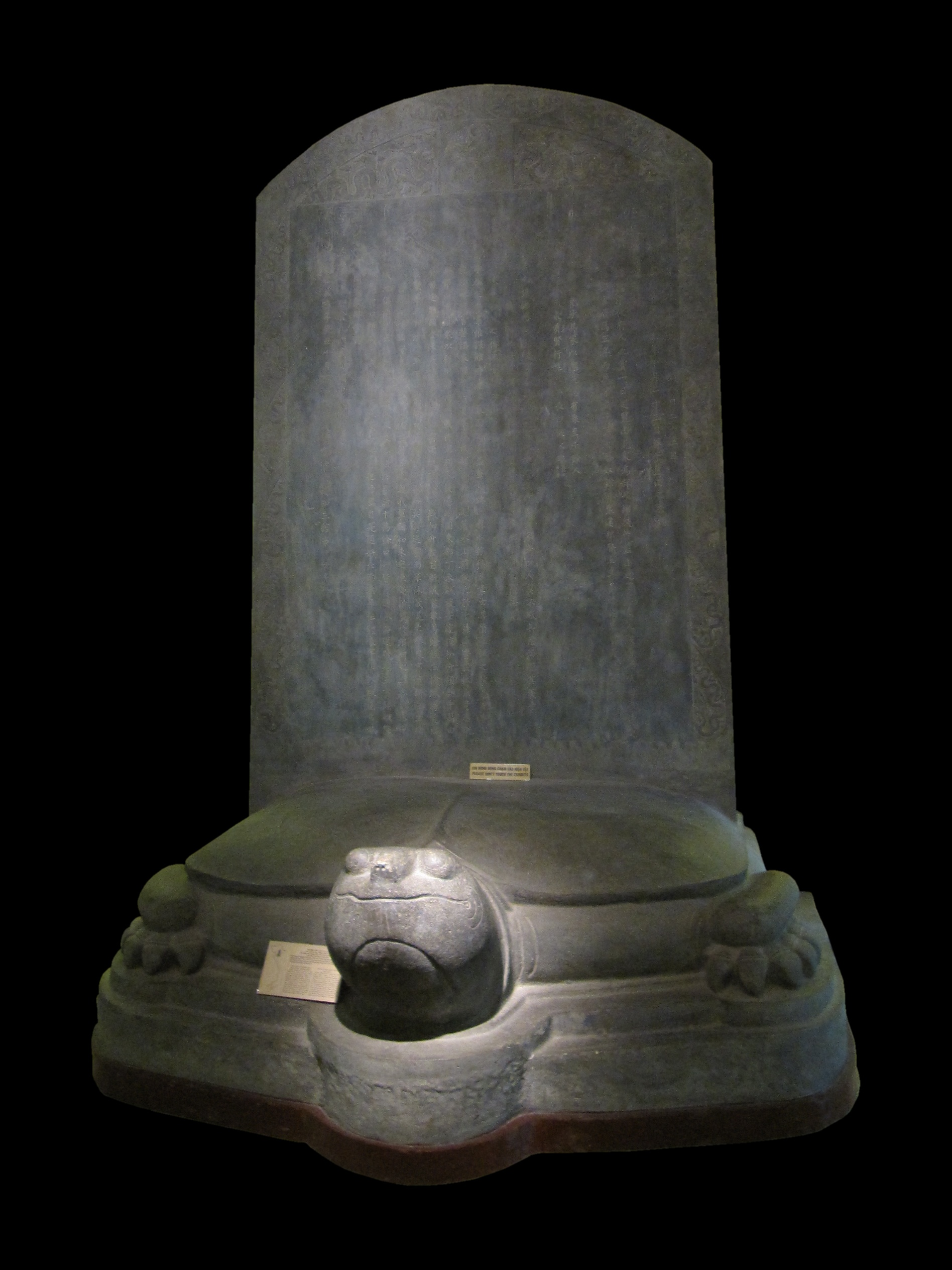
The Vinh Lang stele from Lê Lợi's mausoleum, erected in the 6th year of Thuận Thiên(1433)

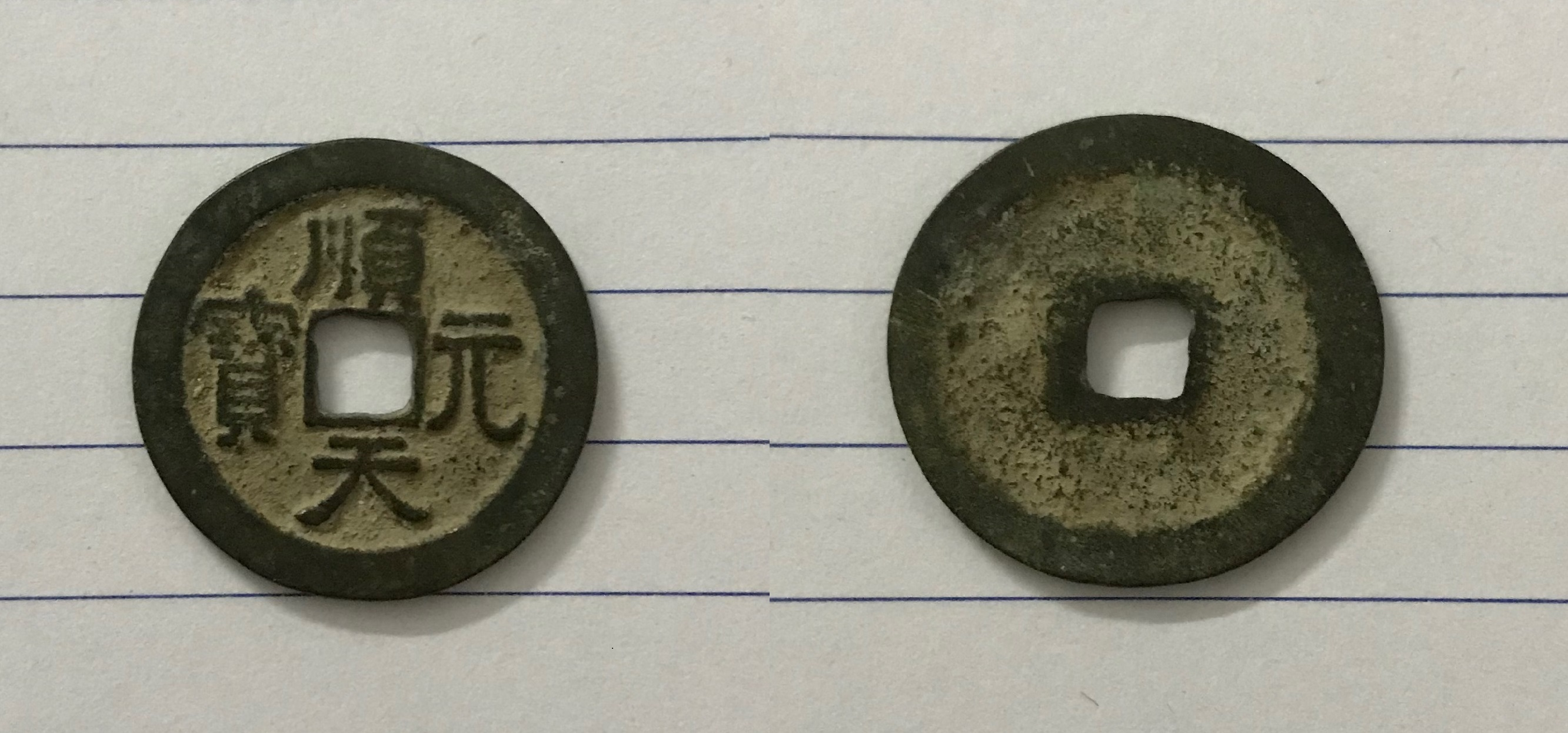
Coins issued by king Lê Lợi

In 1427, after 10 years of war, Đại Việt regained its independence and the Ming Empire officially acknowledged Đại Việt as an independent state (Annam). On April 15, 1428, Lê Lợi took the throne and claimed himself Emperor of the restored Dai Viet kingdom. He chose his reign name Thuận-Thiên (順天), literally "To obey Heaven."

Lê Lợi's proclamation of independence reflected the Sino-Vietnamese tensions as well as Vietnamese pride and patriotism:

Our Great Viet is a country where prosperity abounds.

Where civilization reigns supreme.
Mountains, rivers, frontiers have all been divided;
For the customs are distinct: North and South.

Triệu, Đinh, Lý and Trần
Built our Nation,
Whilst Han, Tang, Song and Yuan
Ruled over Theirs.

Over the Centuries,
We have been sometimes strong, and sometimes weak,
But never yet have we been lacking in heroes.

Of that let our history be the proof."

== Reign ==
Lê Lợi formally re-established Đại Việt as the Xuande Emperor of the Ming Empire officially recognized Lê Lợi as the king of Dai Viet in 1431. In return, Lê Lợi sent diplomatic messages to the Ming imperial court, promising his loyalty as a nominate tributary state of China and cooperation, and paid 50,000 gold taels for obtaining investiture. The Ming imperial court accepted this arrangement, much as they accepted the vassal status of Korea under the Joseon dynasty. Lê Lợi briefly established good relations with Champa's king, Indravarman VI (r. 1400–1441).

Lê Lợi renamed the capital, Thăng Long, to Đông Kinh, which later known as Tonkin. He embarked on a significant reorganization of the Vietnamese government, based on the old system of government which was developed during the late 14th century. He also elevated his longtime comrades and generals such as Nguyễn Trãi, Tran Nguyen Han, Lê Sát, Pham Van Sao, and Trịnh Khả to high official rank.

The Le government rebuilt the infrastructure of Vietnam: roads, bridges, canals. Land distribution were awarded to soldiers that contributed in the war against the Ming Empire. He revived the classical examination and devised good administrative laws. With the peace returned, men released from the army service, included non-Viet soldiers, were encouraged to settle in low density areas in the country, increasing rice production led population expansion during his reign, particularly in the coastal areas.

From 1430 to 1432, the emperor and his army fought a set of campaigns in the hills to the west of the coastal area. Then, in 1433, he became sick and his health declined. On his deathbed he appointed his prince Lê Sát as the regent for his second son, who would rule after him as Lê Thái Tông. He was posthumously named as Thái Tổ.

Internal palace politics quickly decimated the ranks of Lê Lợi's trusted counselors, Trần Nguyên Hãn committed suicide when he was being taken to the capital for investigating his suspected betrayal, Phạm Văn Xảo was executed in 1432 and Lê Sát, who ruled as regent for five years, was executed in 1438. Nguyễn Trãi was killed in 1442 (it was claimed he was involved in or responsible for the death of Lê Thái Tông). Only Trịnh Khả survived to an old age and even he was executed in 1451.

== Myths and legends ==
Many legends and stories were told about Lê Lợi (magical sword, escaped death thanks to fox,...). In story help from fox, Lê Lợi was fighting Ming dynasty for Vietnam's independence. When he was defeated and ran, he saw a corpse of a woman on the way. Lê Lợi then dug a hole and gave her a proper burial, saying that if she protected him from getting captured, he would repay her.

When the Ming soldiers were close, he hid in the bushes. The Chinese soldiers then sent dogs to sniff him out, but spotted within the bushes was a fox with a human face. The fox ran away and the dog followed, but those Ming soldiers killed the dogs for not doing their proper jobs. The soldiers then left, and Lê Lợi escaped capture.

After he became emperor, he would return to that area and set up a shrine, conferring the woman the title of Hộ Quốc Phu Nhân, or Lady Protector of the Nation. The fox spirit eventually became a local god of the area.

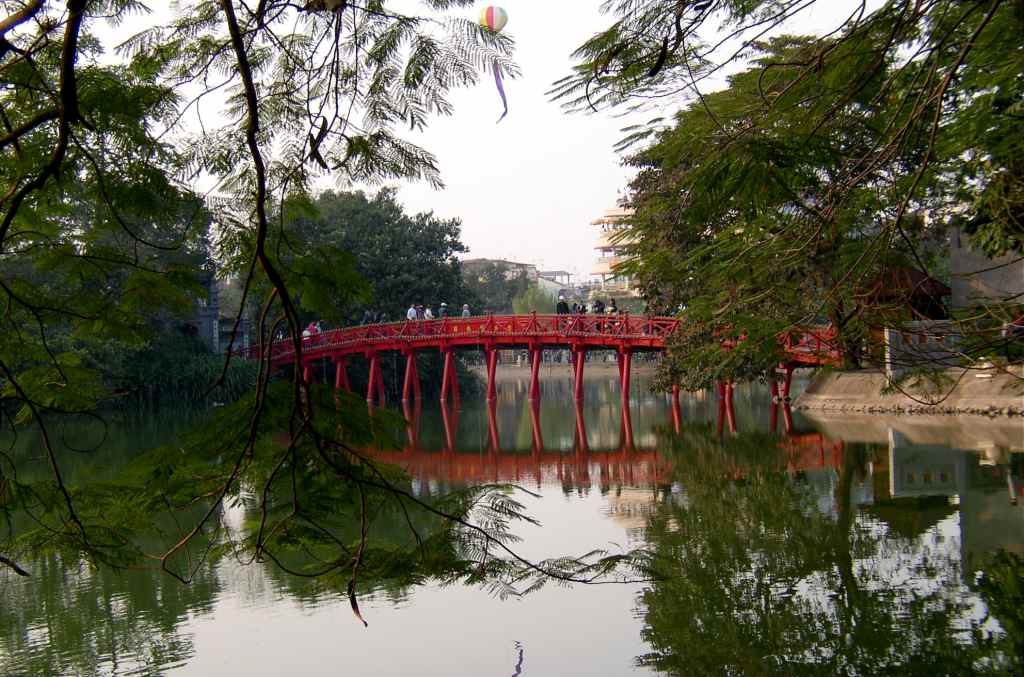
The Lake of the Returned Sword in Hanoi is where Lê Lợi returned the sword to the Golden Turtle, according to the legend.

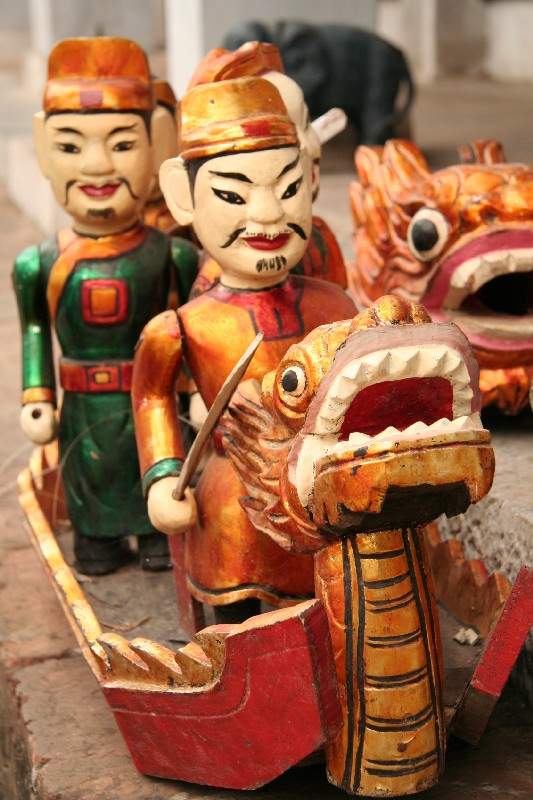
Water puppet of Lê Lợi on the Lake of the Returned Sword

The most famous story concerns his magical sword. Much like King Arthur and his sword Excalibur, Lê Lợi was said to have a magic sword of wondrous power. One story tells that he obtained the sword, inscribed with the words 'The Will of Heaven' (Thuận Thiên) from the Dragon King (Vietnamese: Long Vương), a demi-god to the local people, who decided to lend his sword to Lê Lợi. But there was a catch: the sword did not come straight to him in one piece.

It was split into two parts: a blade and a sword hilt. First, in Thanh Hóa province, there was a fisherman named Lê Thận, who was not related to Lê Lợi in any way. One night, his fishing net caught something heavy. Thinking of how much money he would get for this big fish, he became very excited. However, his excitement soon turned into disappointment when he saw that his catch was a long, thin piece of metal which had somehow become entangled to the net. He threw it back into the water, and recast the net at a different location. When he pulled the net in, the metal piece had found its way back into the net. He picked it up and threw it far away with all its strength. The third time the fishing net came up, the same thing happened, the metal piece was once again caught in the net. Bewildered, he brought his lamp closer and carefully examined the strange object. Only then did he notice that it was the missing blade of a sword. He took the blade home and not knowing what to do with it, put it in the corner of his house. Some years later, Lê Thận joined the rebel army of Lê Lợi, where he quickly rose in ranks. Once, the general visited Lê Thận's home. Lê Thận's house lacked lighting, so everything was dark. But as though it was sensing the presence of Lê Lợi, the blade at the corner of the house suddenly emitted a bright glow. Lê Lợi held up the blade and saw two words manifesting before his very eye: Thuận Thiên (Will of Heaven). With Lê Thận's endorsement, Lê Lợi took the blade with him.

One day, while on the run from the enemy, Lê Lợi saw a strange light emanating from the branches of a banyan tree. He climbed up and there he found a hilt of a sword, encrusted with precious gems. Remembering the blade he found earlier, he took it out and placed it into the hilt. The fit was perfect. Believing that the Heaven had entrusted him with the great cause of freeing the land, Lê Lợi took up arms and rallied people under his banner. For the next few years, the magic sword brought him victory after another. His men no longer had to hide in the forest, but aggressively penetrated many enemy camps, captured them and seized their granaries. The sword helped them push back the enemy, until Vietnam was once again free from Chinese rule. Lê Lợi ascended the throne in 1428, ending his 10-year campaign, and reclaimed independence for the country. The stories claim Lê Lợi grew very tall when he used the sword and it gave him the strength of many men. Other stories say that the sword blade and the sword hilt came together from different places, the blade fished out of a lake, the hilt found by Lê Lợi himself.

The stories largely agree on what happened to the sword: One day, not long after the Chinese had accepted Vietnam as independent, Lê Lợi was out boating on a lake in Hanoi. The golden turtle, Kim Quy, advanced toward the boat and the king, then with a human voice, it asked him to return the magic sword to his master, Long Vương (Dragon King), who lived under the water. Suddenly it became clear to Lê Lợi that the sword was only lent to him to carry out his duty, but now it must be returned to its rightful owner, lest it corrupt him. Lê Lợi drew the sword out of its scabbard and lobbed it towards the turtle. With great speed, the turtle opened its mouth and snatched the sword from the air with its teeth. It descended back into the water, with the shiny sword in its mouth. Lê Lợi then acknowledged the sword had gone back to the Long Vương (Dragon King) and caused the lake to be renamed the "Lake of the Returned Sword" (Hoàn Kiếm Lake) located in present-day Hanoi.

Numerous poems and songs have been written about Lê Lợi, both during his lifetime and in later periods. In Vietnamese historical tradition, he has often been portrayed as a just and capable ruler, and later monarchs were sometimes compared to him as a standard of leadership.

Every town in Vietnam has one of the major streets named after Lê Lợi, but in Hanoi the name is Lê Thái Tổ Street.

== In popular culture ==
In video games

- The video game Age of Empires II HD: Rise of the Rajas contains a six-chapter campaign depicting Lê Lợi.
- The Japanese video game "Hero * Senki WW" features a playable female version of Lê Lợi.
- The name of Vietnamese MMORPG video game Thuận Thiên kiếm is named after the mythical sword of Lê Lợi.
- In Firaxis' "Sid Meier's Civilization V" Le Loi is the Emperor of the Vietnamese Empire.

In anime

- Japanese anime "Fate/Grand Order x Himuro's Universe: Seven Most Powerful Great Figures Chapter".

== Ancestry ==
Ancestry of King Lê Lợi

Lê Hối (?–1320)
Lê Đinh
Nguyễn Thị Ngọc Duyên
Lê Khoáng (1350–1402)
Nguyễn Quách
Lê Lợi (1385–1433)
Trịnh Ngọc Thương

== See also ==
- List of Vietnamese dynasties

== Sources ==
=== Bibliography ===
- Chan, Hok-lam (2008), "The Chien-wen, Yung-lo, Hung-hsi, and Hsiian-te reigns, 1399 - 1435", in Twitchett, Denis Crispin; Fairbank, John K. (eds.), The Cambridge History of China: Volume 7, The Ming Dynasty, Cambridge: Cambridge University Press, pp. 182–284
- Wang, Gungwu (1998), "Ming foreign relations: Southeast Asia", in Twitchett, Denis Crispin; Fairbank, John K. (eds.), The Cambridge History of China: Volume 8, The Ming Dynasty, Cambridge: Cambridge University Press, pp. 301–332, ISBN 0-521-24333-5
- Sun, Laichen (2006), "Chinese Gunpowder Technology and Đại Việt, ca. 1390–1497", in Reid, Anthony; Tran, Nhung Tuyet (eds.), Viet Nam: Borderless Histories, Cambridge: Cambridge University Press, pp. 72–120, ISBN 978-1-316-44504-4
- Anderson, James A. (2020), "The Ming invasion of Vietnam, 1407-1427", in Kang, David C.; Haggard, Stephan (eds.), East Asia in the World: Twelve Events That Shaped the Modern International Order, Cambridge: Cambridge University Press, pp. 87–107, ISBN 978-1-108-47987-5
- Li, Tana (2011), "A Geopolitical Overview", in Li, Tana; Anderson, James A. (eds.), The Tongking Gulf Through History, Pennsylvania: University of Pennsylvania Press, pp. 1–25, ISBN 978-0-812-20502-2
- Kiernan, Ben (2019). Việt Nam: a history from earliest time to the present. Oxford University Press. ISBN 978-0-190-05379-6.
- Tsai, Shih-shan Henry (2011). Perpetual Happiness: The Ming Emperor Yongle. University of Washington Press. ISBN 978-0-295-80022-6.
- Tsai, Shih-shan Henry (1996). The Eunuchs in the Ming Dynasty. SUNY Press. ISBN 0-791-42687-4.
- Simms, Peter and Sanda (1999). The Kingdoms of Laos: Six Hundred Years of History. Curzon Press. ISBN 978-0-7007-1531-2.
- Stuart-Fox, Martin (2006). Naga Cities of the Mekong: A Guide to the Temples, Legends, and History of Laos. Media Masters. ISBN 978-981-05-5923-6.
- Kang, David C.; Nguyen, Dat X.; Fu, Ronan Tse-min; Shaw, Meredith (2019). "War, Rebellion, and Intervention under Hierarchy: Vietnam–China Relations, 1365 to 1841". Journal of Conflict Resolution. 63 (4). Los Angeles, CA, USA: University of Southern California: 896–922. doi:10.1177/0022002718772345. S2CID 158733115.
- Andaya, Barbara Watson; Andaya, Leonard Y. (2015). A History of Early Modern Southeast Asia, 1400-1830. Cambridge University Press.
- Lieberman, Victor (2003). Strange Parallels: Volume 1, Integration on the Mainland: Southeast Asia in Global Context, c.800–1830. Cambridge University Press. ISBN 978-1-139-43762-2.
- Taylor, Keith W. (2013). A History of the Vietnamese. Cambridge University Press. ISBN 978-1-107-24435-1.
- Reid, Anthony (2015). A History of Southeast Asia: Critical Crossroads. Wiley. ISBN 978-1-118-51295-1.
- Toda, Ed (1882). Annam and its minor currency. Noronha & Sons.
- Baldanza, Kathlene (2016). Ming China and Vietnam: Negotiating Borders in Early Modern Asia. Cambridge University Press. ISBN 978-1-316-53131-0.
- Vickers, Edward (2010). Education As a Political Tool in Asia. Routledge. ISBN 978-0-415-59536-0.

Preceded by Hồ dynasty	Emperor of Đại Việt; 1428–1433	Succeeded by Lê Thái Tông
