= Nguyễn Thị Hằng =

- Born: 1441; Gia Miêu outer village, Tống Sơn district, Hà Trung prefect, Thanh Hoa town, Vietnam
- Died: 8 April 1505 (aged 63–64); Trường Lạc palace, Đông Kinh, Vietnam
- Spouse: Lê Thánh Tông
- Issue: Lê Hiến Tông
Regnal name
- Trường Lạc Thánh Từ Hoàng thái hậu (長樂聖慈皇太后), Trường Lạc Thánh Từ Thái hoàng thái hậu (長樂聖慈太皇太后)
Posthumous name
- Huy Gia Tĩnh Mục Ôn Cung Như Thuận Thái hoàng thái hậu (徽嘉靜穆溫恭柔順太皇太后)

Nguyễn Thị Huyên (also Nguyen Thi Hang) (chữ Hán: 阮氏晅; 1441–1505) was a queen consort of Later Lê dynasty. She was the wife of emperor Lê Thánh Tông and mother of emperor Lê Hiến Tông.

== Biography ==
Empress Nguyễn Thị Huyên was born in 1441 at Gia Miêu outer village, Tống Sơn district, Hà Trung local government, Thanh Hoa town. She was the daughter of the Duke Nguyễn Công Lộ and foster daughter of the officer Nguyễn Đức Trung. She has entered Lê dynasty's palace on July 1460 with rank Sung-nghi (充儀), lived at the palace of Vĩnh Ninh.

== See also ==
- Lê Thánh Tông
- Lê Hiến Tông
