= Ming–Việt War =

Conflict between China and Vietnam (1406–1428)

The Ming–Việt War (1406–1428) was a conflict between the Ming dynasty of China and Đại Việt (Note: Đại Ngu under the Hồ dynasty) (present-day northern Vietnam). The Ming dynasty's objective was to annex Đại Việt, and while they initially had some success, the Viets ultimately defended their independence.

The war was sparked by a change in the ruling dynasty in Đại Việt. The Ming dynasty did not recognize the legitimacy of the new Hồ dynasty, established in 1400, and demanded the return of the previous Trần dynasty. After their demands were rejected, they responded by invading Đại Việt in 1406. The Ming dynasty then incorporated the occupied territory as the province of Jiaozhi. The princes of the Trần dynasty led rebellions against Chinese rule, but the Ming defeated the rebels. The Ming was unable to suppress another rebellion led by Lê Lợi in 1418. Due to military failures and the heavy cost of war, the Ming army eventually withdrew from Đại Việt in 1428. This failure in Đại Việt greatly undermined the authority of the Ming dynasty in Southeast Asia.

== Background ==
Geopolitical situation in Southeast Asia in the early 15th century

Đại Việt (present-day northern Vietnam) had been politically independent from China since the 10th century, but was strongly influenced by Chinese culture. The founder of the Ming dynasty, the Hongwu Emperor (r. 1368–1398), considered the cost of expansion greater than the benefit of annexing what he considered "barbaric and backward" territories. Therefore, he included Đại Việt among the territories not to be conquered by his successors.

In the 1390s, the Đại Việt emperors of the Trần dynasty lost power to the minister Lê Quý Ly (1335–1407). Quý Ly incurred the displeasure of the Ming government when he crossed the border in the north and occupied the Siming County of Guangxi. In the south, Đại Việt was repeatedly attacked by the Champa until 1390, when the Cham withdrew after their king fell in battle. In 1400, during civil war in China, Lê Quý Ly overthrew the Trần dynasty and declared himself emperor of the new Hồ dynasty, changing the name of the state to Đại Ngu and his own name to Hồ Quý Ly. In 1402, he abdicated in favor of his son Hán Thương, but still held power. In May 1403, he sent a message to the Ming emperor Yongle (r. 1402–1424) in Nanjing asking for recognition of his son's rule, on the grounds that the previous dynasty had died out and his son was the nephew of the Trần emperor.

In October 1404, Trần Thiêm Bình, a Viet refugee who claimed to be a prince of the overthrown Trần dynasty, arrived in Nanjing and accused Hồ Quý Ly of betraying the rightful ruler. He demanded his own enthronement. The Emperor recognized Bình's claim in 1405 and invited Quý Ly to do the same. Quý Ly had no choice but to confess his crimes and agree to reinstate the Trần dynasty. In the spring of 1406, Bình traveled to Đại Ngu, but on 4 April, shortly after crossing the Sino-Vietnamese border, he was killed by Đại Ngu forces, along with most of his Chinese escort. When news of the massacre reached Nanjing, the Yongle Emperor, who was already hostile towards the Viets due to their incursions into Champa, Guangxi, and Yunnan, decided to punish them.

== The war ==
=== Conquest of Đại Ngu ===
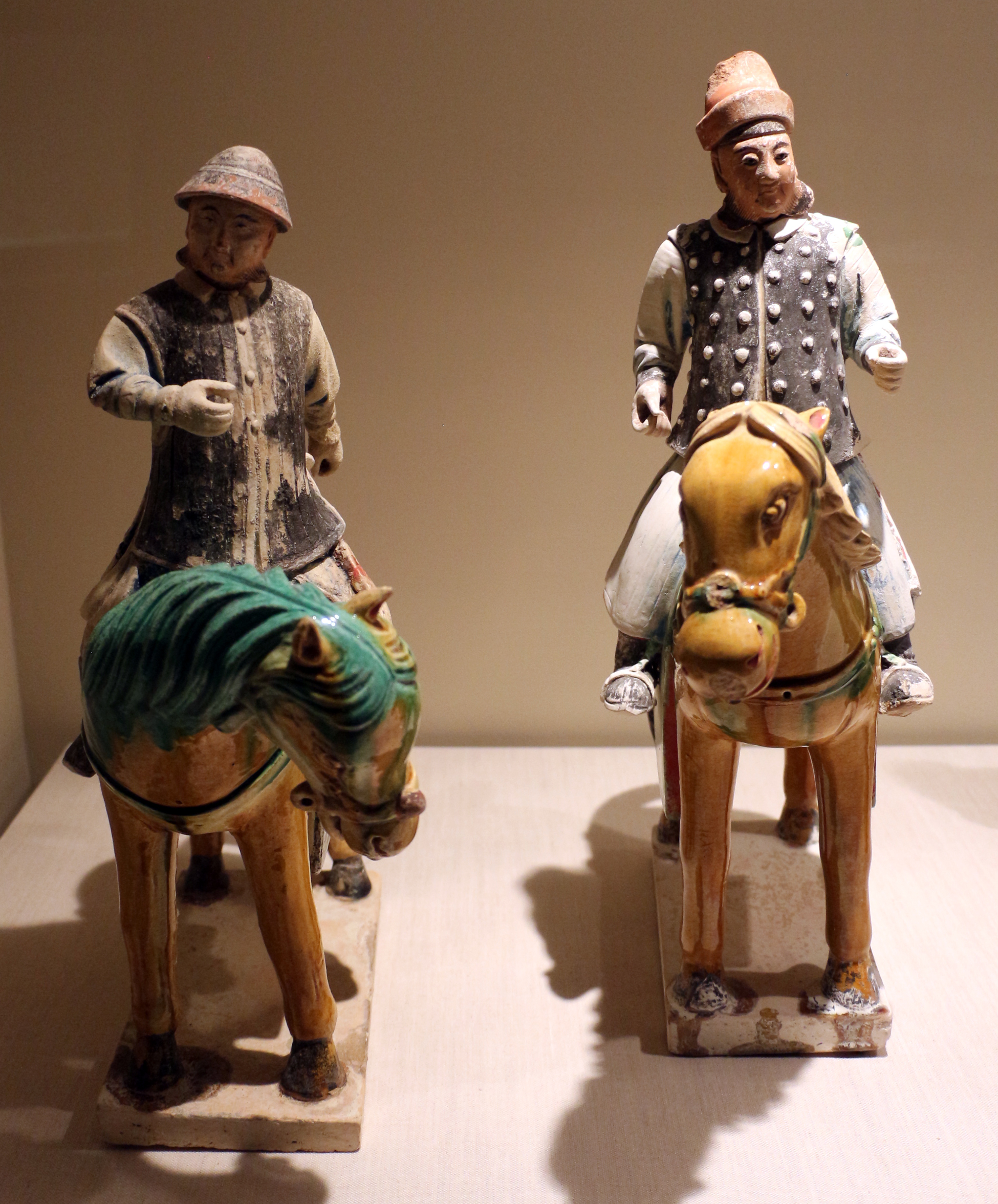
Ming cavalrymen wearing brigandine armour, c. 1400

On 11 May 1406, the Yongle Emperor appointed the general Zhu Neng (朱能) as commander of the punitive expedition, with Zhang Fu and Mu Sheng as his deputies. However, Zhu died suddenly in November, and Zhang and Mu jointly led the expedition. With a force of 215,000 men, they launched their attack from Yunnan and Guangxi. The attack was swift and successful, as the Ming troops were able to cross the border on 19 November 1406.

By 20 and 26 January 1407, the Ming forces had conquered the two capitals of Đại Ngu—Đông Đô (the Eastern Capital, present-day Hanoi) and Tây Đô (the Western Capital). Hồ Quý Ly and his family retreated to the south, where he organized a new army. The war continued for another six months before Quý Ly and his son were ultimately defeated and captured. They were then taken to Nanjing on 16 June 1407. Zhang gathered the remaining supporters of the Trầns and organized their petition for Đại Ngu to join the Ming dynasty. The Yongle Emperor, pleased with the easy victory, officially incorporated Đại Ngu into the Ming dynasty as Jiaozhi Province on 5 July 1407, and began establishing an administration. Zhang successfully crushed the remaining resistance and returned to China with most of the army in 1408.

The rapid conquest of Đại Ngu in 1406–1407 was a unique event among Sino-Vietnamese conflicts from the 10th to the 20th century. Unlike previous conflicts where Vietnam successfully defended its independence, this time they were unable to do so. Despite careful preparations since 1401, several factors led to the collapse of the Viet defense. Hồ Quý Ly demonstrated poor leadership, his troops had low morale, and many Viets opposed his dynasty. Meanwhile, the Ming had capable generals, particularly Zhang Fu, and well-equipped forces with superior firearms and artillery. (Note: In the Ming armies, typically one-tenth of the soldiers were armed with firearms.) These weapons were particularly effective against both Viet infantry and elephants, which had been a formidable force in the past. The Ming artillery also played a crucial role in defeating the Viet fleet in river battles.

=== Ming province ===
Đại Ngu, as Jiaozhi Province, was on equal footing with the other Ming provinces. Jiaozhi was divided into 41 sub-prefectures and 208 counties. The minister Huang Fu (黃福) governed the province, but his relationship with the Ming court was problematic. An administration was established, consisting of both Chinese and Viet officials. Future officials were educated in Confucian schools taught by Chinese teachers. The population was subject to taxes and labor duties similar to those in China. Colonies of hereditary soldiers were also formed, but they were unable to produce enough food to sustain the army stationed in Jiaozhi. Food, weapons, and equipment had to be imported from China at a high cost. In contrast, the Viet experts were sent to China, with 7,600 merchants and craftsmen being sent to Nanjing in 1407. Additionally, the Viet eunuch Nguyễn An played a major role in designing the new Ming capital of Beijing. Many Chinese still viewed Jiaozhi as a foreign country. Officers were often sent there as a form of punishment, and positions in the civil administration were frequently given to individuals who had failed their civil service exams.

=== Anti-Ming uprisings ===
In September 1408, Trần Ngỗi launched an anti-Chinese resistance and declared the restoration of the Trần dynasty in the occupied territory. The Ming sent Mu Sheng from Yunnan to Jiaozhi to suppress the rebellion. The rebels used their knowledge of the environment and gained support from the local inhabitants, successfully defending themselves against Mu's army. In early 1409, Zhang Fu joined the battle, ultimately defeating and capturing Trần Ngỗi in December. The Ming then recalled Zhang to the Mongol border.

However, the fighting did not cease. Trần Ngỗi's nephew Trần Quý Khoáng became the leader of the rebels. The Ming court offered Quý Khoáng the rank of provincial governor, but he refused and the war continued. In early 1411, Zhang returned with reinforcements and defeated the rebels twice, ultimately capturing their capital, Nghệ An (which the Chinese had already lost in 1408). Despite this victory, the fighting persisted. In 1414, Ming troops occupied four prefectures in the south of Jiaozhi, which had previously been conquered by Champa. The Ming's relations with Champa worsened when they rejected the latter's request to return these territories. The turning point in the war came on 30 March 1414, when Ming forces captured Quý Khoáng. After his capture, the Viet resistance weakened and in 1416, most of the Ming army retreated.

However, the period of calm was short-lived. The Ming sent the eunuch Ma Qi (馬騏) to Jiaozhi, (Note: Eunuchs served as personal representatives of the emperor in the provinces, obtaining funds for the imperial treasury through extraordinary allowances and levies, in addition to regular state revenues.) where his demands for excessive benefits and levies caused discontent among the local population. By the time the general Li Bin (李彬) arrived in February 1417 to replace Zhang, the situation had already begun to deteriorate. In late 1417, the Viets, many of whom were military and civilian officials appointed by the Ming government, rebelled once again. The leader of the rebellion was Lê Lợi, who had previously fought under Trần Quý Khoáng and now declared himself king. Despite losing battles in 1419 and 1420, Lê Lợi turned to guerrilla tactics with the support of the local population. Although the Ming deployed a large number of troops, they were unable to defeat the Viets. Li Bin died in 1422, and the Yongle Emperor died in 1424.

=== Viet victory ===
In 1424, the Hongxi Emperor (r. 1424–1425) dismissed Huang Fu as governor of Jiaozhi and replaced him with Chen Zhi (陳智), Earl of Yongchang. According to historians, this decision to remove an experienced and respected governor was a grave mistake. Chen faced challenges with supplies and was unfamiliar with local conditions. Consequently, on 8 May 1426, the Xuande Emperor (r. 1425–1435) appointed Wang Tong (王通) as the new governor, and at the same time announced to his ministers his intention to end the war in Jiaozhi. The ministers held differing opinions, with Jian Yi (蹇義) and Xia Yuanji arguing for the continuation of the war, while Yang Shiqi and Yang Rong supported the Emperor's decision. The court ultimately decided to strengthen the army in Jiaozhi by sending 20,000 soldiers from China and recruiting 30,000 Viet soldiers locally. Additionally, the Ming mobilized hereditary soldiers from military farms, which further strained the supply situation for the troops. The army was largely composed of Viet soldiers led by Chinese officers.

Lê Lợi's army had been greatly strengthened through years of warfare against the Ming. Between 1418 and 1425, his forces captured increasing quantities of Ming weapons and military supplies in several major battles, allowing them to rapidly improve their armaments. In the winter of 1426, Lê Lợi attacked the Ming garrisons and defeated them in several battles, causing the Ming forces to lose tens of thousands of soldiers. The Emperor sent strong reinforcements to Jiaozhi in January 1427, appointing Liu Sheng (柳升) as their commander. At the same time, he sent Huang Fu to Jiaozhi. After a months-long siege in April, the Viets captured the fortress of Xương Giang. This victory marked a turning point in the war–a shift from guerrilla tactics to a regular army capable of openly confronting the enemy. When Liu's 150,000-strong army approached the borders in September 1427, Lê Lợi unexpectedly sent a message to the Ming court, proposing to recognize Trần Cảo, a descendant of the Trần dynasty, as the ruler of Đại Việt if the Chinese guaranteed autonomy. A few days later, Liu's army was defeated and lost 70,000 men. Wang Tong then agreed to Lê Lợi's terms and began to retreat to China. The Ming court only learned of Lê Lợi's offer on 16 November, a month after Liu's defeat. The ministers were still divided in their opinions on the conflict, but the Emperor accepted Lê Lợi's proposal to restore the Trần dynasty. In the first months of 1428, both the military and civilian personnel of the Ming court left Jiaozhi. After his victory, Lê Lợi informed the Chinese envoys that Trần Cảo had died and he would rule alone. He also refused to repatriate the remaining Chinese soldiers and officials.

In 1428 and 1429, the Xuande Emperor demanded the restoration of the Trần dynasty. He did not recognized Lê Lợi as de facto ruler of Đại Việt until 1431, after receiving a humble letter from him. Rather than being named king, Lê Lợi received the title of "administrator of the affairs of Annan". It was not until 1436 that Emperor Yingzong (r. 1435–1449) officially recognized Lê Lợi's successor, Lê Nguyên Long, as king of Annan.

The Chinese occupation of Đại Việt had a significant impact on the restored Viet state, particularly in the military field. The use of advanced firearms allowed Đại Việt to ultimately win the centuries-long war against Champa in the 16th century. Additionally, the 20 years of annexation to the Ming dynasty greatly influenced Đại Việt culture and administrative practices.
