= 1414 =

1414 in various calendars
- Gregorian calendar: 1414; MCDXIV
- Ab urbe condita: 2167
- Armenian calendar: 863; ԹՎ ՊԿԳ
- Assyrian calendar: 6164
- Balinese saka calendar: 1335–1336
- Bengali calendar: 820–821
- Berber calendar: 2364
- English Regnal year: 1 Hen. 5 – 2 Hen. 5
- Buddhist calendar: 1958
- Burmese calendar: 776
- Byzantine calendar: 6922–6923
- Chinese calendar: 癸巳年 (Water Snake); 4111 or 3904 — to — 甲午年 (Wood Horse); 4112 or 3905
- Coptic calendar: 1130–1131
- Discordian calendar: 2580
- Ethiopian calendar: 1406–1407
- Hebrew calendar: 5174–5175
- Hindu calendars
- Vikram Samvat: 1470–1471
- Shaka Samvat: 1335–1336
- Kali Yuga: 4514–4515
- Holocene calendar: 11414
- Igbo calendar: 414–415
- Iranian calendar: 792–793
- Islamic calendar: 816–817
- Japanese calendar: Ōei 21 (応永２１年)
- Javanese calendar: 1328–1329
- Julian calendar: 1414; MCDXIV
- Korean calendar: 3747
- Minguo calendar: 498 before ROC 民前498年
- Nanakshahi calendar: −54
- Thai solar calendar: 1956–1957
- Tibetan calendar: ཆུ་མོ་སྦྲུལ་ལོ་ (female Water-Snake); 1540 or 1159 or 387 — to — ཤིང་ཕོ་རྟ་ལོ་ (male Wood-Horse); 1541 or 1160 or 388

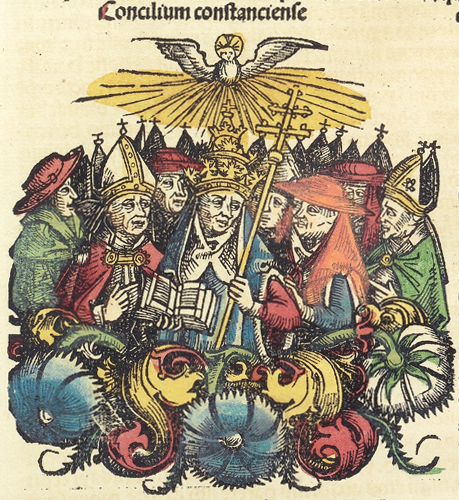
November 16: The Council of Constance is opened by King Sigismund of Germany to settle the Western Schism.

Year 1414 (MCDXIV) was a common year starting on Monday of the Julian calendar.

== Events ==
=== January–March ===
- January 7 – After the Battle of Grunwald, the Teutonic Order can’t sustain the warmongering politics of Heinrich von Plauen and thus Michael Küchmesier becomes the 28th Grand Master of the Teutonic Order, succeeding Heinrich von Plauen.
- January 9 – The Oldcastle Revolt, led by John Oldcastle as an uprising by the Lollards in England against King Henry V, begins at St. Giles' Fields. King Henry's troops, stationed at Clerkenwell Priory in London, halt the rebellion the next day and capture 80 rebels who are later convicted of and executed for treason.
- February 11 – The coronation of Ferdinand I as King of Aragon takes place at Zaragoza.
- February 26 – The speech given by French theologian Jean Petit of the "Council of Faith", including nine propositions drawn from the speech, is publicly burned by order of the inquisitor, Gerard de Montaigu, the Roman Catholic Bishop of Paris.
- March 9 – Abu’l-Faḍl Abbas Al-Musta'in, previously forced to abdicate as Sultan of Egypt and replaced by Al-Mu'ayyad Shaykh on November 6, 1412, is forced out from his office as Caliph of Cairo. The Sultan Shaykh then designates his own brother, Sulaymān al-Mustakfī, as the new Caliph of Cairo.
- March 30 – The rebellion by Vietnamese Emperor Tran Quy Khoang against the Ming dynasty Chinese occupying armies comes to an end when Tran is captured and imprisoned by General Zhang Fu, marking a turning point in the Ming–Việt War.

=== April–June ===
- April 6 – China's Emperor Cheng Zu departs from Beijing to lead a military campaign against the Oirat Mongols.
- April 30 – The second English Parliament of King Henry V opens at Westminster and Walter Hungerford is elected as Speaker of the House of Commons.
- May 28 – Khizr Khan, Timur's governor of Multan in India, conquers the Delhi Sultanate from Daulat Khan Lodi, founding the Sayyid Dynasty.
- May 29 – The English Parliament closes its session after 29 days, and King Henry V gives royal assent to numerous laws.
- June 23 – Yeshaq I, succeeds his brother Tewodros I as Emperor of Ethiopia

=== July–September ===
- July – The Hunger War takes place between the allied Kingdom of Poland, and Grand Duchy of Lithuania, against the Teutonic Knights, who are severely weakened after the Battle of Grunwald four years prior. The war earned its name from destructive scorched earth tactics followed by both sides.
- July 21 – Iskandar Mirza, who had ruled the Timurid Empire since 1409, is captured as the city of Isfahan surrenders to Shah Rukh.
- August 6 – Joanna II becomes the reigning Queen of Naples upon the death of her brother, King Ladislaus.
- August 29 – The brotherhood of the "Sancta dels Folls Dona Nostra i Desamparats Innocents" (Our Lady of the Insane and the Forsaken Innocents) is founded in Valencia to help the mentally ill, but soon extends its mission to take care of homeless and abandoned children.
- September 20 – A giraffe is presented to China's Emperor Cheng Zu as a gift from the Sultan of Bengal, Saifuddin Hamza Shah.

=== October–December ===
- October – The Hunger War ends inconclusively with a truce brokered by a Papal legate. Famine and plague is sweeping through Prussia as a result from the war.
- October 8 – Bohemian church reformer Jan Hus departs his home at the invitation of King Sigismund of Germany in order to attend the Council of Constance. A few weeks after his November 3 arrival, however, even though he was promised safe-conduct - he is imprisoned for heresy and spends the rest of his life in captivity.
- November 8 – The coronation of Sigismund of Luxembourg as King of the Romans takes place at Aachen, four years after he had been elected.
- November 16 – The Council of Constance opens at Konstanz begins in order to end the western schism and resolve the conflict of having three different Popes recognized by Rome (Benedict XIII), Avignon (Gregory XII) and Pisa (John XXIII), after being summoned by King Sigismund.
- November 19 – The Third Parliament of King Henry V of England opens at Westminster and passes numerous laws, including the Suppression of Heresy Act 1414, the Riot Act 1414, and the Safe Conducts Act 1414.
- December 17 – (4 Shawwal 817 AH) In Ahmedabad in the Gujarat Sultanate in India, construction of Ahmed Shah's Mosque is completed and the date is etched into stone.
- December 19 – In Poland, Casimir, Duke of Oświęcim takes full power as he reaches the age of 18.

=== Date unknown ===
- Ernest, Duke of Austria (head of the Leopoldian line of the House of Habsburg) is the last duke to be enthroned in the Duchy of Carinthia, according to the ancient Carantanian ritual of installing dukes at the Prince's Stone; he adopts the title of Archduke.
- Alien priory cells are suppressed in England.
- The Tibetan lama Je Tsongkhapa, of the Gelug school of Buddhism, declines the offer of the Emperor Cheng Zu of China to appear in the capital at Nanjing, although he sends his disciple Chosrje Shākya Yeshes, who is given the title "State Teacher". The later Xuande Emperor will grant Yeshes the title of a king, upon a return visit to China (to the new capital at Beijing).
- Durham School is founded as a grammar school in the city of Durham, England by Thomas Langley, Prince-Bishop of Durham; it continues in existence as an independent school 600 years later.
- Inquisitor Heinrich Schöneveld presides over the trials of 84 members of the millenarian sect of flagellants in Sangerhausen, Thuringia. He sentences three individuals to death, while others receives penitential measures as they renounced heresy. After the departure of the inquisitor, local authorities disregards his judgments, burning all heretics at the stake and organizing a hunt for their supporters in the area. In total, during this year, at least 168 individuals (perhaps even around 300) are burned at the stake by secular courts in Thuringia.

== Births ==
- January 7 – Henry II, Count of Nassau-Siegen, Co-ruler of Nassau-Siegen (1442–1451) (d. 1451)
- March 25 – Thomas Clifford, 8th Baron de Clifford, English noble (d. 1455)
- May 11 – Francis I of Brittany (d. 1450)
- July 21 – Pope Sixtus IV (d. 1484)
- November 7 – Jami, Persian poet (d. 1492)
- November 9 – Albrecht III Achilles, Prince-elector of the Margraviate of Brandenburg (d. 1486)
- date unknown
  - Charles I, Count of Nevers, Count of Nevers and Rethel (d. 1464)
- probable – Narsinh Mehta, poet-saint of Gujarat (d. 1481)

== Deaths ==
- February 19 – Thomas Arundel, Archbishop of Canterbury (b. 1353)
- March 28 – Jeanne-Marie de Maille, French Roman Catholic saint (b. 1331)
- June 23 – Tewodros I, Emperor of Ethiopia
- August 6 – King Ladislaus of Naples (b. 1377)
- September 1 – William de Ros, 6th Baron de Ros, Lord Treasurer of England (b. 1369)
- date unknown
  - Fairuzabadi, Persian lexicographer (b. 1329)
  - Ali ibn Mohammed al-Jurjani, Persian encyclopaedic writer (b. 1339)
  - John I Stanley of the Isle of Man, Lord Lieutenant of Ireland, King of the Isle of Man (b. 1350)
- probable – Zyndram of Maszkowice, Polish 14th- and 15th-century knight (b. 1355)
