= Jiaozhi (Ming province) =

Province of Ming China in present-day northern Vietnam (1404–1427)

Jiaozhi Province 交趾 Giao Chỉ
- Province of the Ming dynasty
- 1407–1427
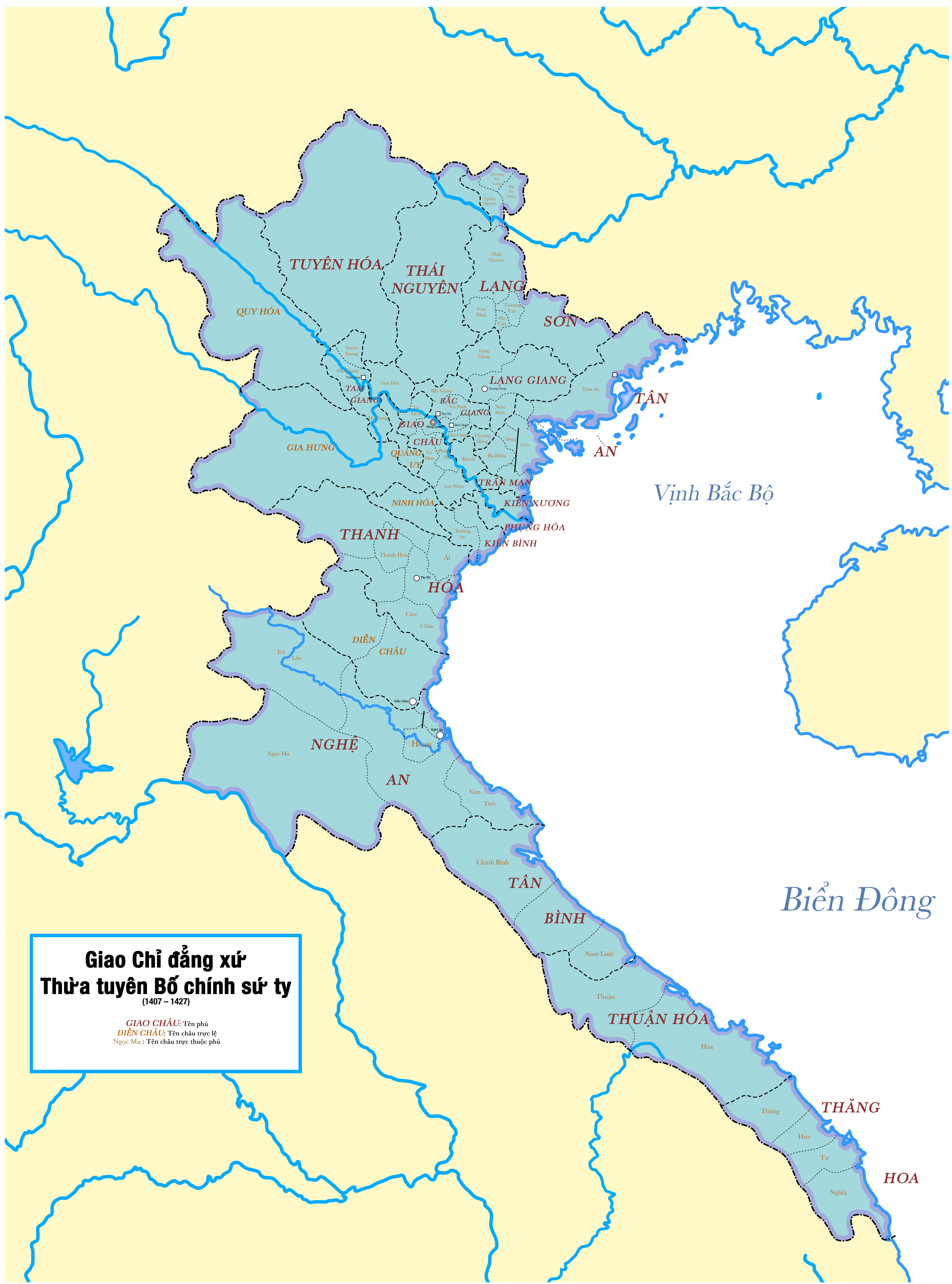
- Map of Jiaozhi Province

- Jiaozhi when it was under Ming occupation (1407–1427)
- Capital: Dongguan (known as Đông Quan in Vietnamese; present day Hà Nội)
- Government
  - Type: Provincial
- Provincial administrator
  - 1407–1424: Huang Fu (first)
  - 1424–1426: Chen Qia (last)
- Regional chief commander
  - 1407–1417: Zhang Fu (first)
  - 1408–1415: Mu Sheng
  - 1427: Liu Sheng (last)
- History
  - Military defeat of Đại Ngu: 1407
  - Trần princes's revolts suppressed: 1413
  - End of the Lam Sơn uprising: 1427
Preceded by	Succeeded by
Hồ dynasty; Later Trần dynasty	Later Lê dynasty

Chinese name
- Traditional Chinese: 交趾等處承宣布政使司
- Simplified Chinese: 交趾等处承宣布政使司
- Literal meaning: "Administrative bodies responsible for Jiaozhi and neighboring areas"
Transcriptions
Standard Mandarin
- Hanyu Pinyin: Jiāozhǐ děngchù chéngxuān bùzhèng shǐsī
- Bopomofo: ㄐㄧㄠ ㄓˇ ㄉㄥˇ ㄔㄨˋ ㄔㄥˊ ㄒㄩㄢ ㄅㄨˋ ㄓㄥˋ ㄕˇ ㄙ
- Wade–Giles: Chiao¹-chih³ teng³-ch'u⁴ ch'eng²-hsüan¹ pu⁴-cheng⁴ shih³-ssu¹

Vietnamese name
- Vietnamese: Giao Chỉ đẳng xứ Thừa tuyên Bố chính sứ ty

History of Vietnam
(by names of Vietnam)
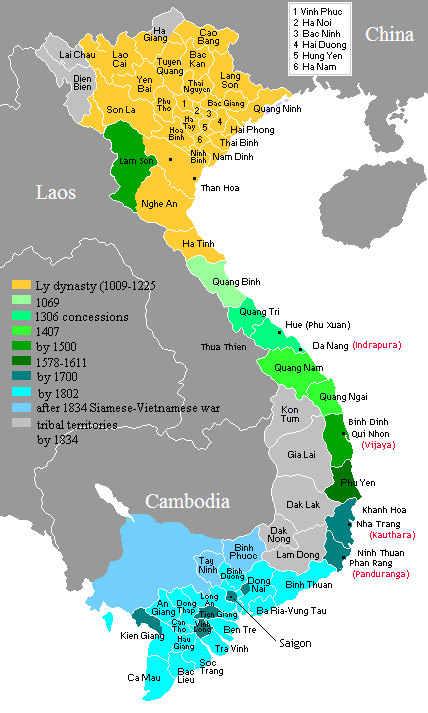

~2879–2524 BC	Xích Quỷ (Note: legendary)
~700–258 BC	Văn Lang
257–179 BC	Âu Lạc
204–111 BC	Nam Việt
111 BC – 40 AD	Giao Chỉ
40–43	Lĩnh Nam
43–203	Giao Chỉ
203–544	Giao Châu
544–602	Vạn Xuân
602–679	Giao Châu
679–757	An Nam
757–766	Trấn Nam
766–866	An Nam
866–968	Tĩnh Hải quân
968–1054	Đại Cồ Việt
1054–1400	Đại Việt
1400–1407	Đại Ngu
1407–1427	Giao Chỉ
1428–1804	Đại Việt
1804–1839	Việt Nam
1839–1945	Đại Nam
1887–1954	Đông Dương
1945–	Việt Nam
Main template
History of Vietnam

Jiaozhi Provincial Administration Commission (交趾等處承宣布政使司), commonly abbreviated as Jiaozhi (交趾), was a provincial-level administrative body established by the Ming dynasty in Vietnam during the Fourth Era of Northern Domination, following the conquest of the Hồ dynasty in 1407. The institution was tasked with implementing administrative policies, managing taxation, and overseeing governance in the occupied territory. The Ming administration applied a bureaucratic and legal system similar to that used in other interior Chinese provinces, dividing the region into 15 prefectures and 5 independent prefectures, covering most of the area north of the present-day Central–Annamite Range.

During this period, the Ming dynasty introduced various cultural and administrative policies aimed at integrating the region into its imperial system, which provoked widespread resentment among the local population and sparked numerous uprisings. Following the Lam Sơn uprising (1418–1427), led by Lê Lợi, Ming forces eventually withdrew. In 1428, with the establishment of the Lê dynasty, the Jiaozhi Provincial Administration was formally abolished, marking the end of direct Chinese administration in the region.

== Background ==
From the Qin and Han dynasties through the Five Dynasties and Ten Kingdoms period, successive Chinese dynasties established administrative institutions and exercised direct control over territories in what is now northern Vietnam. This period of Chinese rule, often referred to in Vietnamese historiography as the Eras of Northern Domination, came to an end in the 10th century. As the Tang dynasty weakened and was unable to maintain effective control over its southern frontier, local leaders in Vietnam gradually asserted autonomy. In 939, after defeating Southern Han forces at the Battle of Bạch Đằng, Ngô Quyền declared himself king, establishing an independent Vietnamese polity and formally ending nearly a millennium of Chinese rule.

By the late 14th century, the Trần dynasty of Đại Việt maintained a tributary relationship with the Ming dynasty, receiving investiture titles from the Ming emperor and acknowledging suzerainty in a nominal sense. However, internal instability marked the final years of the Trần court. In 1400, Hồ Quý Ly seized power and founded the short-lived Hồ dynasty, deposing the Trần monarch. This political upheaval provided the Yongle Emperor of Ming China with a pretext to intervene.

In 1407, the Ming launched a large-scale invasion of Đại Ngu. Although initially claiming to restore the Trần lineage, the Ming court soon received reports—based on false memorials submitted by military commanders—that all members of the Trần royal family had been executed by Hồ Quý Ly, and that no legitimate successor remained. Vietnamese local officials and elders in the Red River Delta were also presented with these claims. Subsequently, the Yongle Emperor declared that Annam (Đại Việt) was formerly part of the ancient Jiaozhou commandery and should be restored as a province under direct imperial administration.

== Administration ==
Jiaozhi Province was structured in the same manner as the 13 existing provinces of the Ming Empire. It was divided into 15 prefectures (府) and 5 independent prefectures (直隸州):

- 15 prefectures: Jiaozhou (交州), Beijiang (北江), Liangjiang (諒江), Sanjiang (三江), Jianping (建平, Kiến Hưng in Hồ dynasty), Xin'an (新安, Tân Hưng in the Hồ dynasty), Jianchang (建昌), Fenghua (奉化, Thiên Trường in the Hồ dynasty), Qianghua (清化), Zhenman (鎮蠻), Liangshan (諒山), Xinping (新平), Yanzhou (演州), Yian'an (乂安), Shunhua (順化).
- 5 independent prefectures: Taiyuan (太原), Xuanhua (宣化, Tuyên Quang in the Hồ dynasty), Jiaxing (嘉興), Guihua (歸化), Guangwei (廣威)

Together with the 5 independent prefectures, there were other administrative divisions, which were under the normal prefectures. There were 47 divisions in total.

In 1408, the independent administrative divisions of Taiyuan and Xuanhua was promoted to a prefecture, which increased the number to 17. Afterwards, the Yanzhou prefecture was dismissed and its territory became an independent prefecture.

== Bibliography ==
- Anderson, James A. (2020), "The Ming invasion of Vietnam, 1407-1427", in Kang, David C.; Haggard, Stephan (eds.), East Asia in the World: Twelve Events That Shaped the Modern International Order, Cambridge: Cambridge University Press, pp. 87–100, ISBN 978-1-108-47987-5
- Clark, Hugh (2009), "The Southern Kingdoms between the T'ang and the Sung, 907–979", in Twitchett, Denis; Fairbank, John K. (eds.), The Sung Dynasty and Its Precursors, 907-1279, Part 1, New York: Cambridge University Press, pp. 133–205
- Kang, David C.; Nguyen, Dat X.; Fu, Ronan Tse-min; Shaw, Meredith (2019). "War, Rebellion, and Intervention under Hierarchy: Vietnam–China Relations, 1365 to 1841". Journal of Conflict Resolution. 63 (4). Los Angeles, CA, USA: University of Southern California: 896–922. doi:10.1177/0022002718772345. S2CID 158733115.
- Kiernan, Ben (2019). Việt Nam: a history from earliest time to the present. Oxford University Press. ISBN 978-0-190-05379-6.
- Lockhart, Bruce M.; Duiker, William J. (14 April 2010). The A to Z of Vietnam. Scarecrow Press. ISBN 978-1-4617-3192-4.
- Tsai, Shih-shan Henry (2001). Perpetual happiness: The Ming emperor Yongle. Seattle: University of Washington Press. ISBN 0-295-98109-1.
- Taylor, Keith Weller (1983), The Birth of the Vietnam, University of California Press, ISBN 978-0-520-07417-0
