= Ming conquest of Đại Ngu =

1406–1407 Chinese military campaign

Ming–Đại Ngu War
- Part of the Ming–Việt War
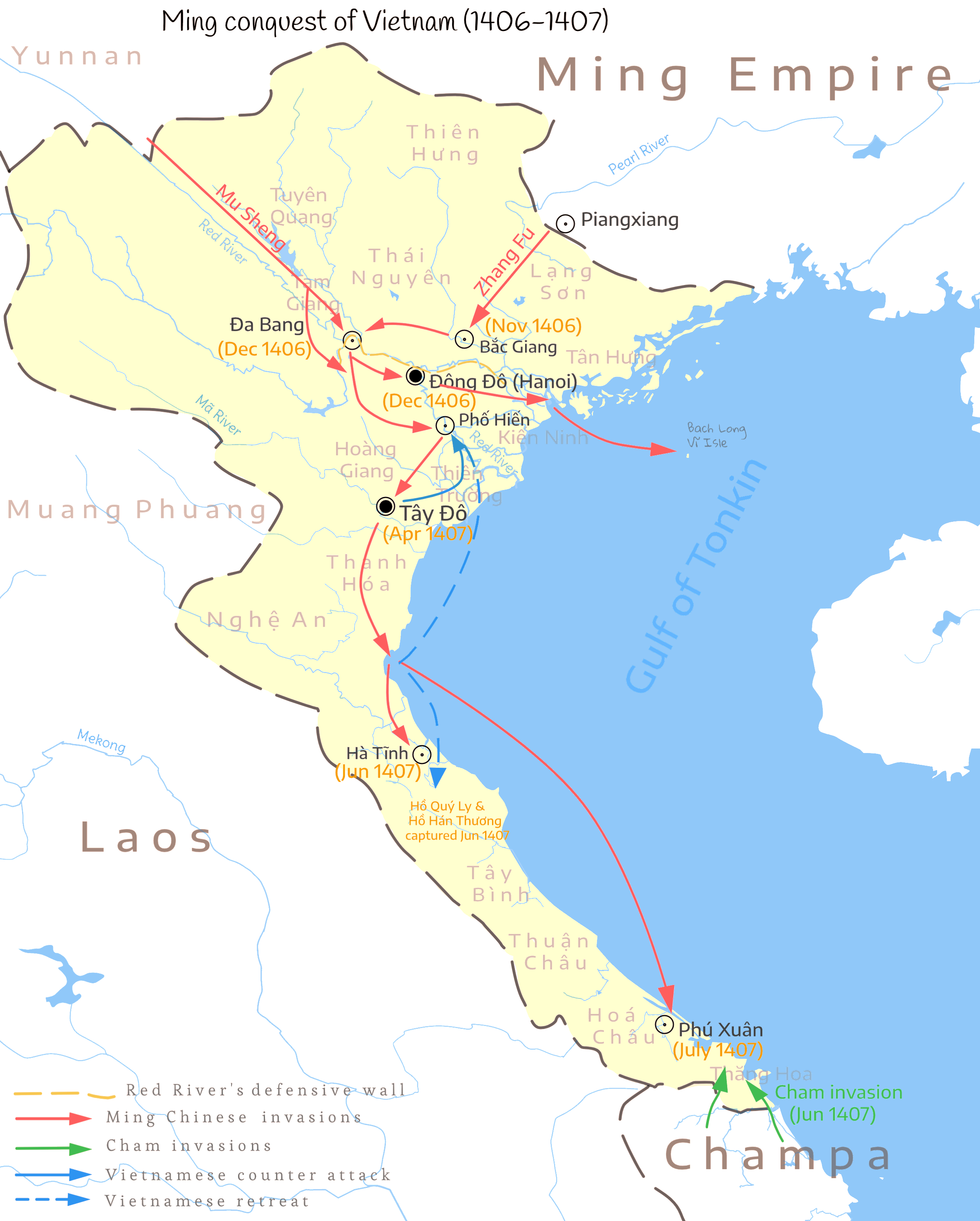
Date	11 May 1406 – 17 June 1407
Location	Đại Ngu (renamed from Đại Việt); 20°04′41″N 105°36′17″E
Result	Ming victory: Ming conquest of Đại Việt; Collapse of the Hồ dynasty; Start of revolts by the Trần loyalists
Territorial changes	Ming annexation of Đại Ngu as Jiaozhi

Belligerents
Ming dynasty	Đại Ngu under the Hồ dynasty

Commanders and leaders
Yongle Emperor; Zhang Fu; Mu Sheng; Zhu Neng; Cheng Kuan	Hồ Quý Ly (POW); Hồ Hán Thương (POW); Hồ Nguyên Trừng (POW); Lương Nhữ Hốt (surrendered); Phạm Thế Căng (surrendered); Nguyễn Phi Khanh (POW)

Strength
215,000 troops	Unknown

Casualties and losses
Unknown	Most dead, surrendered or disbanded

The Ming invasion of Viet (Chinese: 明入越/平定交南), known in Vietnam as the Ming–Đại Ngu War (traditional Chinese: 大虞與明戰爭; simplified Chinese: 大虞与明战争; Vietnamese: Chiến tranh Đại Ngu–Đại Minh / cuộc xâm lược của nhà Minh 1406–1407; Hán Nôm: 戰爭大虞 – 大明) was a military campaign against the kingdom of Đại Ngu (present-day northern Vietnam) under the Hồ dynasty by the Ming dynasty of China. The campaign began with Ming intervention in support of a rival faction to the Hồ dynasty which ruled Đại Ngu, but ended with the incorporation of Đại Ngu into the Ming dynasty as the province of Jiaozhi. The invasion is acknowledged by recent historians as one of the most important wars of the late medieval period, whereas both sides, especially the Ming, used the most advanced weapons in the world at the time.

A few years prior to the invasion, Hồ Quý Ly usurped the throne of the Trần dynasty of the Dai Viet, which led to the intercession of the Ming government to re-establish the Trần. However, Hồ forces attacked the Ming convoy escorting a Trần pretender, and all were killed in the attack. After this, the Yongle Emperor appointed Marquises Zhang Fu to prepare and lead the Ming armies for the invasion of Đại Ngu. The war lasted from 1406 to 1407, resulting in the Ming conquest of Đại Ngu and the capture of Hồ Quý Ly, his princes and members of the Hồ family.

== Background ==
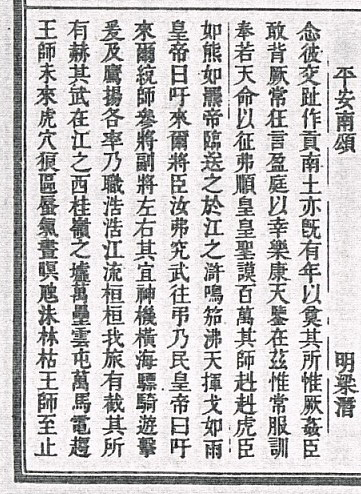
The Edict to Invade Annam by the Yongle Emperor written in July 1406.

During the late 14th-century, the kingdom of Đại Việt faced both ecological breakdown, plagues, social crisis and Cham invasions. Robbery and bandits increased as the ruling position of Trần dynasty weakened. In the capital, Thăng Long, turmoil and chaos broke out in 1369–70, provoking a princely coup and a short, bloody civil war. From the south, Champa under Chế Bồng Nga managed to invade Đại Việt and sacked Vietnamese capital Thăng Long in 1371. In 1377, Chế Bồng Nga defeated and killed Đại Việt's king, Trần Duệ Tông, in a battle near Vijaya, then marched north and sacked Thăng Long four more times from 1378 to 1383. During this chaotic period, Neo-Confucianism became increasingly influential. Classic Confucian scholars began challenging the royal structures and the predominantly Buddhist elites. Cham invasions, coupled with natural disasters and political intrigues, ultimately induced a radical intellectual and reformer, Lê Quý Ly (c. 1336–1408). By using guns (most likely hand cannons) in a battle against Cham forces in 1390, the Vietnamese army killed Chế Bồng Nga with cannons, and saved their state from the brink of collapse.

The ruling house of Đại Việt, the Trần dynasty, had entered tributary relations with the Ming since 1369. The previous Ming emperor, the Hongwu emperor, had listed Đại Việt as country "never to be invaded." In 1400 Lê Quý Ly deposed the Trần king, killed off most of his family, proclaimed himself king, and changed his surname to Hồ. Encountering a failed coup by the Trần, Hồ Quý Ly repressed dissenters by executing 370 dissidents, seizing their possessions, enslaving their female relatives, and burying alive or drowning males of all ages. He changed the kingdom's name to Đại Ngu. In 1401, he abdicated the throne in favor of his son, Hồ Hán Thương (Ho De). In May 1403 he sent envoys to the Ming court to request Hồ Hán Thương's investiture on the grounds that the Trần family line had died out and that his son was a royal nephew. The Ming emperor, unaware of the events that had taken place, duly granted his request. In October 1404, Trần Thiêm Bình arrived at the Ming imperial court in Nanjing, claiming to be a Trần prince. He notified the court of the events that had taken place and appealed to the court for the restoration of his throne. No action was taken by them until early 1405 when his story was confirmed by a Vietnamese envoy.

In 1405, Yongle Emperor of the Ming dynasty issued an edict reprimanding the usurper and demanding the restoration of the Trần throne. Hồ Quý Ly had doubts about the pretender's claims, but nevertheless acknowledged his crimes and agreed to receive the pretender as king. The nominal king was escorted back by a Ming envoy in a military convoy. On 4 April 1406, as the party crossed the border into Lạng Sơn, Hồ's partisans ambushed them and killed the Trần prince that the Ming convoy was escorting back. Hồ Quý Ly expected the Ming to retaliate, so he prepared the military for the imminent Ming invasion. He also took on a hostile foreign policy, which included harassing the southern border of the Ming. Upon hearing the news, Yongle reportedly said "If we do not destroy them, what are armies for?" On 16 July 1406, an imperial proclamation laid down "20 formal reasons" why forces were being dispatched against Annam.

== Preparations ==
=== Hồ Quý Ly's defense plan ===
From 1404, Hồ Quý Ly prepared for war with the Ming. Landless, unemployed, and indigent men were organized into special army units. Boats were used for patrolling the border. Wooden stakes were planted at strategic points in the rivers to bar invading ships, from the sea and from Yunnan down the Red River. Skilled engineers to make weapons were gathered at newly established arsenals. The army was reorganized, and Hồ Quý Ly traveled throughout the kingdom to inspect the terrain and make plans for defense. He ignored the advice of one general to engage invaders in the mountainous terrain on the borders and instead, prepared a riverbank defense in the center of the Red River Delta. The key to his plan was the Đa Bang fortress (in modern-day Vĩnh Phúc Province) built on the southern bank of the Red River northwest of Đông Đô, at the point where Ming armies from Yunnan and Guangxi would most likely attempt to join forces. The fortress wall was high, and significant quantities of hand cannons, arrows, wooden, and stone obstacles were deployed. To defend the town, two deep moats were constructed with bamboo sticks inside. Outside the moats, pits with pointed bamboo and wooden sticks for trapping horses were dug.

=== Chinese preparations ===
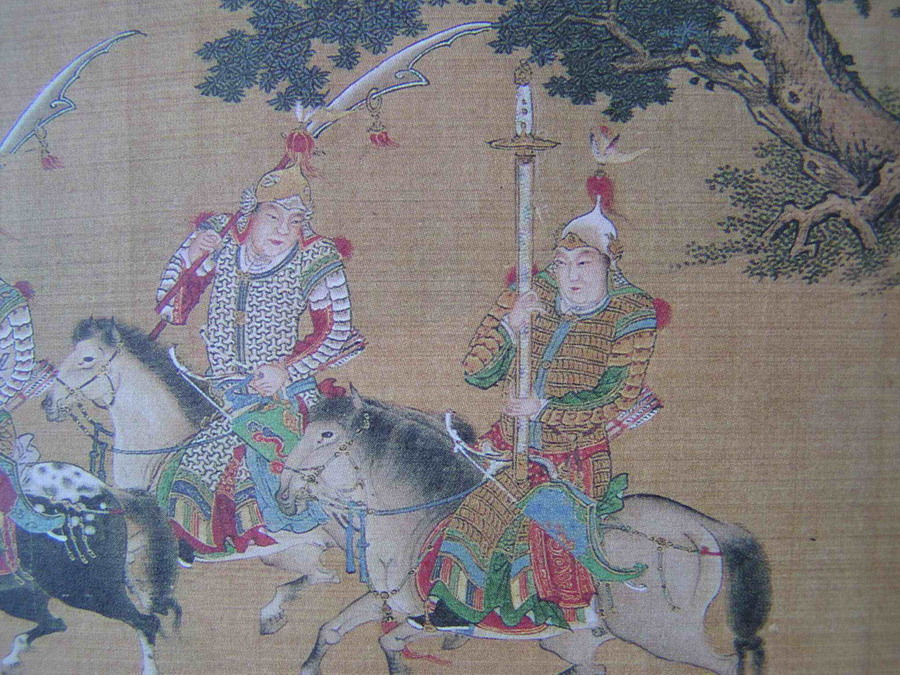
Ming cavalry from the painting, "Departure Herald"

On 11 May (according to Chan) or in the month of July (according to Tsai) 1406, the Yongle Emperor appointed Duke Zhu Neng to lead an invasion with Marquises Zhang Fu and Mu Sheng as second-in-command. Chen Qia was appointed to oversee the supplies, while Huang Fu was appointed to handle political and administrative affairs. On the eve of departure, the Yongle Emperor gave a banquet at the Longjiang naval arsenal, located at the Qinhuai River in Nanjing. The Yongle emperor was highly concerned with this campaign and paid much attention to every detail in the preparation. To withstand Đại Ngu's firearms (huoqi), he ordered the Ministry of Works to manufacture large, thick, and durable shields. He ordered that the technology of making firearms, including the handgun (shenji chong), should not be leaked to the enemy. Particularly, the "firearm generals" (shenji jiangjun) were ordered to make sure that when their troops withdrew, firearms would "be counted each to its original number and not a single piece be allowed to go."

Huang Fu kept a log to document the military campaign. Sixteen days before the Yongle Emperor gave the banquet at Longjiang, Huang Fu had departed from Nanjing and spent a night at Longjiang, before sailing west on the Yangtze River. After eight days, he reached Poyang Lake; after another week, he reached Dongting Lake. Thereafter, Huang traveled through the Xiang River southwards, passing Xiangtan and Guilin, heading towards Nanning in Guangxi. Three months had passed after his departure from Nanjing, when Huang arrived at Longzhou in Guangxi, where he joined the main body of the Ming forces. Zhu Neng and Zhang Fu would cross the border from Guangxi, while Mu Sheng would invade the Red River Delta from Yunnan. However, Zhu Neng died, aged 36, at Longzhou in Guangxi. Thus, Zhang Fu took over the command of the Ming army stationed there. The military expedition would now be commanded by Zhang Fu and Mu Sheng.

== Invasion ==
=== Early phase ===
In the winter of 1406, the Ming armies began their invasion. Modern historians estimate that 135,000 troops set off from Guangxi and 80,000 troops set off from Yunnan. Forty batteries or units (dui) were equipped with 3,600 thunderclap bombs (pili pao), 160 "wine-cup muzzle general cannon" (zhankou jiangjun pao), 200 large and 328 small "continuous bullet cannon" (lianzhu pao), 624 handguns (shouba chong), 300 small grenades (xiao feipao), about 6.97 tons of gunpowder, and 1,051,600 or more bullets of approximately 0.8 ounce each. The total weight of the weaponry was 29.4 tons.

On November 19, 1406, Ming troops led by Zhang Fu entered Đại Ngu from Guangxi while those under Mu Sheng marched from Yunnan. Soon afterward, Đại Ngu troops—20,000 at the Ailuu Pass and 30,000 at the Ke-lang Pass—tried to block Zhang Fu's armies with huochong and other weapons, but they were routed easily. On 24 November 1406, Zhang Fu's forces conquered Cần Tram and several other strongholds. Mu Sheng's forces, who had departed from Yunnan, met up and joined Zhang Fu's forces at Đa Bang castle (northwest to Hanoi). One of the Ming commanders told their soldiers, "This city is what the enemy relies on."

=== Battle of Đa Bang ===
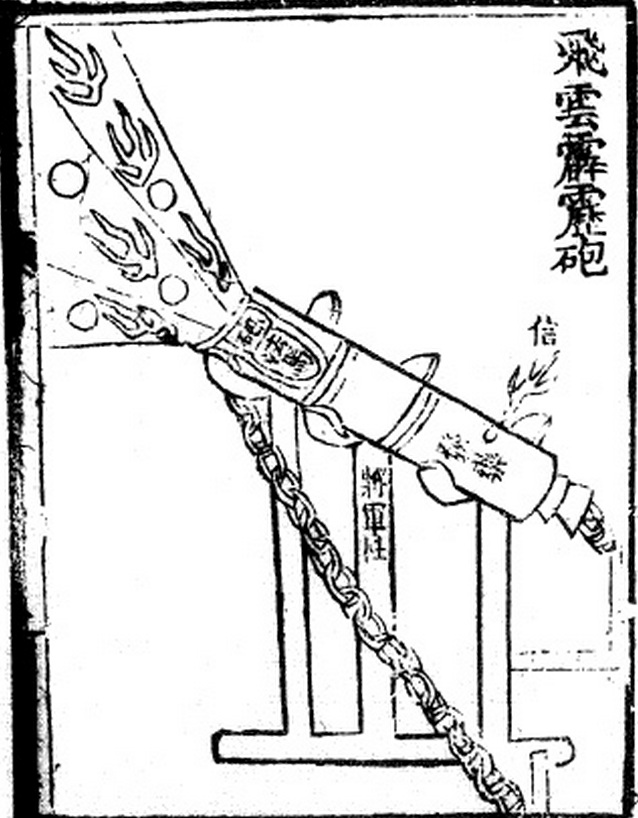
An "eruptor" firing thunderclap bombs from the Huolongjing

On the afternoon of January 19, 1407, the Ming army launched their assault on Đa Bang fortress. Ming troops attacked the fortress from all directions, employing scaling ladders, xianren dong and gunpowder signal lights (yemingguang huoyao). According to the Vietnamese chronicles, the Đại Việt sử ký toàn thư, which was complied in 1479, "the dead bodies [of the Ming soldiers] piled up as high as the city wall, but [the Ming troops] still kept climbing and fighting; nobody dared to stop." When the Ming troops climbed onto the town wall, the alarmed and bewildered Vietnamese defenders could only shoot a few arrows and fire lances. After having successfully entered the city, the Ming soldiers were confronted by Vietnamese war elephants and numerous infantry. Ming troops covered their horses with lion masks to scare the elephants. Ming generals Luo Wen and Cheng Kuan ordered the firearm regiments to shoot chong and fire lance at the elephants. The elephants all trembled with fear and were wounded by the gun arrows, causing the Vietnamese army to panic. The Ming advanced on their horses, the foot soldiers shot a large number of arrows, handguns, and cannons (pao), and pursued the disarrayed Vietnamese force into the town as they forgot to close the town's gate. As a result, the battle lasted for two days, as the town of Đa Bang fell, and the defense line along the Red River collapsed.

In the next day, following the fall of Đa Bang, Zhang Fu's forces easily captured the city of Đông Đô (modern-day Hanoi) Six days later, the capital Tây Đô was easily captured as well.

Prominent families from the Red River Delta, led by Mạc Thúy and his brothers (descendants of Mạc Đĩnh Chi), pledged their allegiance to the Ming. By late January 1407, the Ming armies had taken control of the Red River Delta.

=== Vietnamese defeat ===
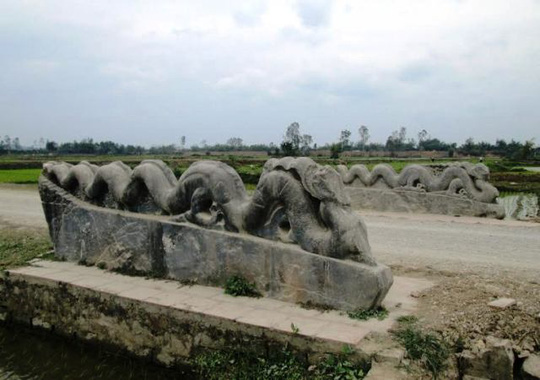
Decapitated dragon statues in Tay Do

On February 21, Hồ Nguyên Trừng (son of Hồ Quý Ly), commanding 500 ships, launched a counterattack on the Ming forces on the Thái Bình River. The Chinese mobilized their navy and foot soldiers, employed "magic handgun/cannon" and "bowl-sized muzzle cannon", destroyed Hồ Nguyên Trừng's fleet, and killed more than ten thousand Vietnamese soldiers. One Chinese source describes the scene as one in which the firing of "firearms [was] like flying stars and lightning." In February alone, the Ming claimed 37,390 "enemy heads." On March 18, 1407, in the Phung Hoa prefecture, Ming troops used da jiangjun chong ("great general cannon") to smash many enemy ships.

On May 4, 1407, a major battle took place at the Hàm Tử Pass (modern-day Khoái Châu District, Hưng Yên Province) on the Red River. Hồ Quý Ly mustered a reserve force of 70,000 troops and numerous warships and riverboats, which extended to more than ten li. Vietnamese soldiers loaded chong to fire at the Ming soldiers. Though the sources are silent regarding this issue, the Ming side no doubt employed heavy firearms, especially considering that the firearms generals Zhang Sheng, Ding Neng, and Zhu Gui were involved. The Ming troops won a significant victory, killing over 10,000 Vietnamese troops, and capturing more than hundreds of warships. On May 30, the Ming army killed another ten thousand Vietnamese soldiers in Thanh Hoá.

By early June 1407, Hồ Quý Ly was forced to flee southwards as he had lost the support of his people and was being pursued by the Ming forces. The Ming armies expelled him from Thanh Hoá. The ruler of Dai Ngu had to destroy his palace at Tây Đô and then fled to the south by ship. He and his son Hồ Hán Thương were captured by the Ming on 16 June 1407. The rest of the family were captured on either the same or following day. Their capture occurred in the region of present-day Hà Tĩnh Province. They were caged and brought as prisoners to the Yongle Emperor in Nanjing. After his initial campaign in Northern Vietnam, Zhang Fu sent a letter urging the Chinese court to annex Đại Việt and rule it as a province of China:

Your servant Zhang Fu has reviewed the annals. Annan was once Jiaozhou. In the Han and Tang it could only be loosely governed by China, and in the Song and Yuan it was again raided and humiliated. Exceed their rightful place, they are set in their evil ways of usurpation and revolt. Although we sent troops to punish them, they alternatively rebel and come to allegiance. It is intolerable to heaven and earth, infuriating to humans and spirits... Several hundred kinds of tattoo-faced and shrike-tongued people have ascended to an earthly paradise. Several thousand of li of fish and salt producing land have all entered the map. We have recovered our ancient territory and propagated Zhonghua's system of propriety.

— Zhang Fu

Great slaughter accompanied the Ming campaign. In the final victory announcements, the Chinese commanders claimed that "seven million" of the Vietnamese forces had been killed.

== Aftermath ==
Jiaozhi (northern Vietnam) when it was under Ming occupation

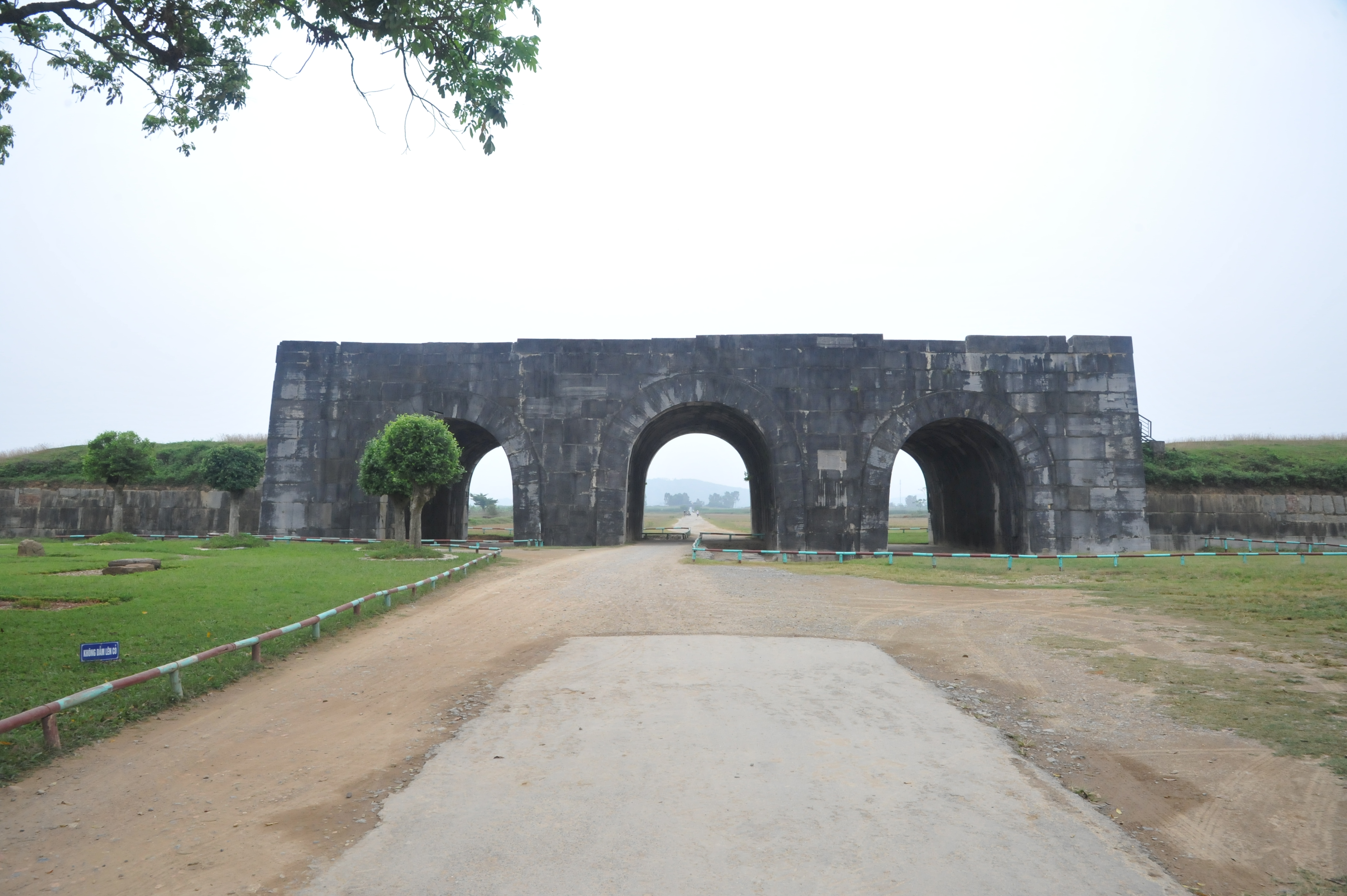
Remnants of a gate at Tay Do, the citadel of the Hồ dynasty

On 5 October 1407, the prisoners were charged with high treason by the Ming imperial court. The Yongle Emperor asked them whether they had killed the former king and had usurped the throne of the Trần royal family, but he received no answer in return. Most of the prisoners were either imprisoned or executed.

Hồ Quý Ly and his son Hồ Hán Thương were imprisoned, but there is no known record of their eventual fates thereafter. (Note: Kathlene Baldanza indicates that Ho Quy Ly and some his most important advisers, his second son–king Ho Han Thuong, his first son–prince Ho Nguyen Trung, several grandsons (including two of Ho Nguyen Trung's son), and other relatives, all were captured as prisoners to Nanjing. When the Ming asked Ho Quy Ly to explain his rebellious behavior, Ho Quy Ly remained silent. The Ming Shilu claims that Ho Quy Ly and Ho Han Thuong were sent to prison and the rest were pardoned; other accounts claimed that Ho Quy Ly was ultimately executed or be sent to be a foot soldier in Guangxi. Overall, Ho Quy Ly's death still remains unclear.) The oldest son Hồ Nguyên Trừng, known in Chinese as Li Cheng, became a weapon engineer near the Chinese capital Beijing, manufactured Dai Viet-style firearms for the Chinese to use against the Mongols. In 1442, he wrote a memoir titled Nam Ông mộng lục (Chinese: 南翁夢錄) about his homeland.

In July 1407, Yongle changed the name of Annam to Jiaozhi – an old Han dynasty designation – and made it a province of China. Lü Yi (呂毅) was appointed as the military commissioner, Huang Zhong (黃中) as the vice-commissioner, and Huang Fu (黃福) as the provincial administrator and the surveillance commissioner. Jiaozhi province was divided into fifteen prefectures, 41 sub-prefectures, and 210 counties. Thăng Long was renamed to Dongguan, became the new administrative center of Jiaozhi province. The Chinese embarked on a systematic removal of all royal archives, including the Lý civil code, Trần law, the Trần kings' and generals' memoirs, poetry, and 30 volumes of the Vietnamese chronicles. All traces of Thăng Long's history were destroyed, explaining the lack of remains from the pre-Lê Lợi period. 7,700 artisans and traders were taken to China. Among them was a young eunuch, Nguyễn An, who later served the Ming court; more important he is known as the key architect of the Beijing Imperial Palace. (Note: Henry Tsai says Nguyen An was brought to China as tribute when he was a young child by Tran king of Dai Viet. John Miksic says Nguyen An was brought to China as a prisoner after the 1407 war.) The Ming imposed a new administrative system and divided the country into garrisons. A Chinese way of life was imposed on the Vietnamese. Vietnamese had to grow their hair long, don Ming dress, and employ Ming customs and traditions. Tattooing, betel nut chewing, and teeth lacquering were banned. (Note: Henri Cordier states that "Regarding the tattooed inhabitants of Caugigu, let it be remembered that tattooing existed in Annam till it was prohibited by the Chinese during the occupation of Tung-king at the beginning of the 15th century.") The new administration also made identity cards mandatory. Vietnamese men were subjected to military conscription.

The Chinese administration conscripted forced labourers and imposed heavy taxes on everything from rice fields to mulberry trees to silk cloth made on local looms. The first major signs of discontent against Chinese rule would surface when Trần Ngỗi (a former Trần official) revolted in September 1408, but he was captured by Zhang Fu in December 1408. Trần Quý Khoáng (a nephew of Trần Ngỗi) would continue the rebellion until he was captured by Zhang Fu on 30 March 1414, formally ending the rebellion. Uprisings continued throughout the course of the Chinese rule. The Ming occupation of Vietnam would last only two decades, but this period continues to have an influence on the modern-day relationship between the People's Republic of China and the Socialist Republic of Vietnam.

== See also ==
- 1075–1077 Song–Dai Viet War
- 1789 Qing intervention in Đại Việt
- 1979 Sino-Vietnamese War

== Bibliography ==
- Anderson, James A. (2020), "The Ming invasion of Vietnam, 1407–1427", in Kang, David C.; Haggard, Stephan (eds.), East Asia in the World: Twelve Events That Shaped the Modern International Order, Cambridge: Cambridge University Press, pp. 97–107, ISBN 978-1-108-47987-5
- Andrade, Tonio (2019), "How Yongle learned to stop worrying and love the gun: Perspectives on Early Ming Military", in Ken, Swope (ed.), The Ming World, Taylor & Francis, pp. 71–87, ISBN 978-1-000-13466-7
- Baldanza, Kathlene (2016). Ming China and Vietnam: Negotiating Borders in Early Modern Asia. Cambridge University Press.
- Chan, Hok-lam (2008), "The Chien-wen, Yung-lo, Hung-hsi, and Hsiian-te reigns, 1399 – 1435", in Twitchett, Denis Crispin; Fairbank, John K. (eds.), The Cambridge History of China: Volume 7, The Ming Dynasty, Cambridge: Cambridge University Press, pp. 182–284
- Dardess, John W. (2012). Ming China, 1368–1644: A concise history of a resilient empire. Lanham: Rowman & Littlefield. ISBN 978-1-4422-0491-1.
- Dreyer, Edward L. (1982). Early Ming China: A political history, 1355–1435. Stanford: Stanford University Press. ISBN 0-8047-1105-4.
- Dutton, George E. (2012), Sources of Vietnamese Tradition, Columbia University Press
- Kiernan, Ben (2019). Việt Nam: a history from earliest time to the present. Oxford University Press. ISBN 978-0-190-05379-6.
- Kyong-McClain, Jeff; Du, Yongtao (2013). Chinese History in Geographical Perspective. Rowman & Littlefield. ISBN 978-0-7391-7230-8.
- Miksic, John Norman; Yian, Goh Geok (2016). Ancient Southeast Asia. Routledge. ISBN 978-0415735544.
- Sun, Laichen (2006), "Chinese Gunpowder Technology and Đại Việt, ca. 1390–1497", in Reid, Anthony; Tran, Nhung Tuyet (eds.), Viet Nam: Borderless Histories, University of Wisconsin Press, pp. 72–120, ISBN 978-1-316-44504-4
- Taylor, K.W. (2013). A History of the Vietnamese. Cambridge University Press. ISBN 978-0-521-87586-8.
- Tsai, Shih-shan Henry (2011). Perpetual happiness: The Ming emperor Yongle. Seattle: University of Washington Press. ISBN 978-0-295-98109-3.
- Wade, Geoff (2014), "The "native office" system: A Chinese mechanism for southern territorial expansion over two millennia", in Wade, Geoff (ed.), Asian Expansions: The Historical Experiences of Polity Expansion in Asia, Taylor & Francis, pp. 69–91, ISBN 9781135043537
- Wang, Gungwu (1998), "Ming foreign relations: Southeast Asia", in Twitchett, Denis Crispin; Fairbank, John K. (eds.), The Cambridge History of China: Volume 8, The Ming Dynasty, Cambridge: Cambridge University Press, pp. 301–332, ISBN 0-521-24333-5
