= Nguyễn Cảnh Chân =

Nguyễn Cảnh Chân (阮景真, 1355–1409) was a general who fought against the Ming dynasty of the Later Trần dynasty. He was born in Ngọc Sơn village, Thanh Chương district, Nghệ An province, Vietnam.

== Biography ==
=== Hồ dynasty government official ===
At the end of the Trần dynasty, Nguyễn Cảnh Chân worked as An Phủ Sứ in Hoa Chau, Thua Thien-Hue. At that time the Trần government was in the hands of Hồ Quý Ly. In 1400, Hồ Quý Ly dethroned the last Trần emperor and declared himself emperor, establishing the Hồ dynasty and renaming the country from Đại Việt to Đại Ngu Hồ Quý Ly.

In 1402, Nguyễn Cảnh Chân was promoted as an An phủ sứ lộ Thăng Hoa.

=== Advisory for Giản Định Đế ===
"A younger son of the late emperor Trần Nghệ Tông, Trần Ngỗi rises his banner in 1406, proclaimed himself Gian Dinh emperor and started a revolt. His base first centered in Ninh Bình Province and was supported by Tran Trieu Co, a mandarin under the Later Trần dynasty.

Nguyễn Cảnh Chân was a military advisory, a high-ranking official under the Later Trần dynasty.

In March 1409, he was arrested and killed by Giản Định Đế.
