= Fourth Era of Northern Domination =

1407–1427 period of Chinese rule in Vietnam

Fourth Era of Northern Domination Bắc thuộc lần thứ tư 北屬吝次四
- 1407–1428
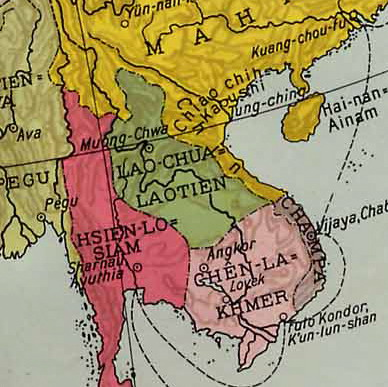
- Jiaozhi Province (northern Vietnam) when it was under Ming occupation (1407–1428)
- Status: Province of the Ming dynasty
- Capital: Đông Quan (present day Hà Nội)
- Common languages: Vietnamese
- Government: Provincial
- Emperor
  - 1407–1424: Yongle Emperor (first)
  - 1424–1425: Hongxi Emperor
  - 1425–1428: Xuande Emperor (last)
- Provincial administrator
  - 1407–1424: Huang Fu (first)
  - 1424–1426: Chen Qia (last)
- History
  - Military defeat of Đại Ngu: 1407
  - Trần princes's revolts suppressed: 1413
  - Establishment of the Later Lê dynasty: 1428
- Currency: cash coins
Preceded by	Succeeded by
Hồ dynasty; Later Trần dynasty	Later Lê dynasty
- Today part of: Vietnam

The Fourth Era of Northern Domination (Vietnamese: Bắc thuộc lần thứ tư) was a period of Vietnamese history, from 1407 to 1428, during which Ming-dynasty China ruled Vietnam as the province of Jiaozhi (Giao Chỉ). The Ming established their rule in Vietnam following their conquest of the Hồ dynasty in 1406–1407. (The previous periods of Chinese rule in the Vietnamese lands, collectively known as Bắc thuộc, lasted much longer and amounted to around 1000 years.) The fourth period of Chinese rule over Vietnam eventually ended with the establishment of the Lê dynasty in April 1428.

== History ==
=== Ming conquest of Đại Ngu ===
Jiaozhi (northern Vietnam) when it was under Ming occupation

In mid-late 14th century, the kingdom of Đại Việt (north Vietnam) faced a series of troubles resulting in an ecological breakdown. This led to the rising of a radical intellectual and reformer, Hồ Quý Ly (c. 1336 – 1408). In 1400, Hồ Quý Ly deposed and massacred the Trần house before usurping the throne. After taking the throne, Hồ Quý Ly renamed the country from Đại Việt to Đại Ngu. In 1402, he abdicated the throne in favor of his son, Hồ Hán Thương.

In October 1404, Trần Thiêm Bình arrived at then Ming imperial court in Nanjing, claiming to be a Trần prince. He notified the court of the treacherous events that had taken place and appealed to the court for the restoration of his throne.

The Yongle Emperor of the Ming Empire issued an edict reprimanding the usurper and demanding the restoration of the Trần throne. As the party crossed the border into Lạng Sơn, Hồ's forces ambushed them and killed the Trần prince that the Ming convoy were escorting back.

Upon hearing the news, Yongle reportedly said "If we do not destroy them, what are armies for?". Yongle, who inherited some interests in the world empire, sent additional forces to punish Hồ Quý Ly. In November 1406, 215,000 Ming troops under skilled generals Zhang Fu and Mu Sheng departed from Guangxi and Yunnan respectively to launch an invasion of Đại Việt. On 19 November 1406, they captured the two capitals and other important cities in the Red River Delta. They quickly defeated Hồ Quý Ly's army and occupied the country. Hồ Quý Ly and his son were captured on 16 June 1407, and were caged and brought as prisoners to the Yongle Emperor in Nanjing. After his initial campaign in Vietnam, Zhang Fu sent a letter urging the Chinese court to annex Đại Việt and rule it as a province of China:

Your servant Zhang Fu has reviewed the annals. Annan was once Jiaozhou. In the Han and Tang it could only be loosely governed by China, and in the Song and Yuan it was again raided and humiliated. Exceed their rightful place, they are set in their evil ways of usurpation and revolt. Although we sent troops to punish them, they alternatively rebel and come to allegiance. It is intolerable to heaven and earth, infuriating to humans and spirits... Several hundred kinds of tattoo-faced and shrike-tongued people have ascended to an earthly paradise. Several thousand of li of fish and salt producing land have all entered the map. We have recovered our ancient territory and propagated Zhonghua's system of propriety."

— Zhang Fu

Furthermore, Zhang Fu wrote that 1,100 members of the Vietnamese elite requested that they be absorbed and assimilated, again into the Chinese state. The Ming's ethnic Vietnamese collaborators included Mac Thuy whose grandfather was Mạc Đĩnh Chi who was a direct ancestor of Mạc Đăng Dung. The Chinese then renamed the Vietnamese land to a Han-era name Jiaozhi and incorporated the former kingdom into their empire.

=== Revolt of Trần royals ===
The Chinese army turned into an occupation force. Despite support from some sectors of Vietnamese society, ongoing local resistance forced the Ming to retreat. There were several revolts among the Vietnamese people against the Ming authorities, but they all proved unsuccessful. Among the people who led rebellions were, Trần Ngỗi (revolted 1407–09), a young son of the late king Trần Nghệ Tông and Trần Quý Khoáng, a nephew. These revolts were short-lived and poorly planned but they helped lay some of the groundwork for Lê Lợi's war of independence.

After the defeat of the Trần-led revolts, between 1415 and 1424, leaders of the uprising included Buddhist monks inspired by Vietnamese nationalism emerged in Lạng Giang, Nghệ An, Hanoi, Ninh Kiều, Lạng Sơn and other prefecture capitals where Ming troops were stationed. In the meantime, anti-Chinese activists used the heroic deeds of their martyrs to support Vietnamese patriotism and keep up the struggle against their colonial masters.

=== Lam Sơn uprising ===
Lê Lợi, one of Vietnam's most celebrated heroes, is credited with rescuing the country from Ming domination in 1428. Born of a wealthy landowning family, he served as a senior scholar-official until the advent of the Ming, whom he refused to serve.

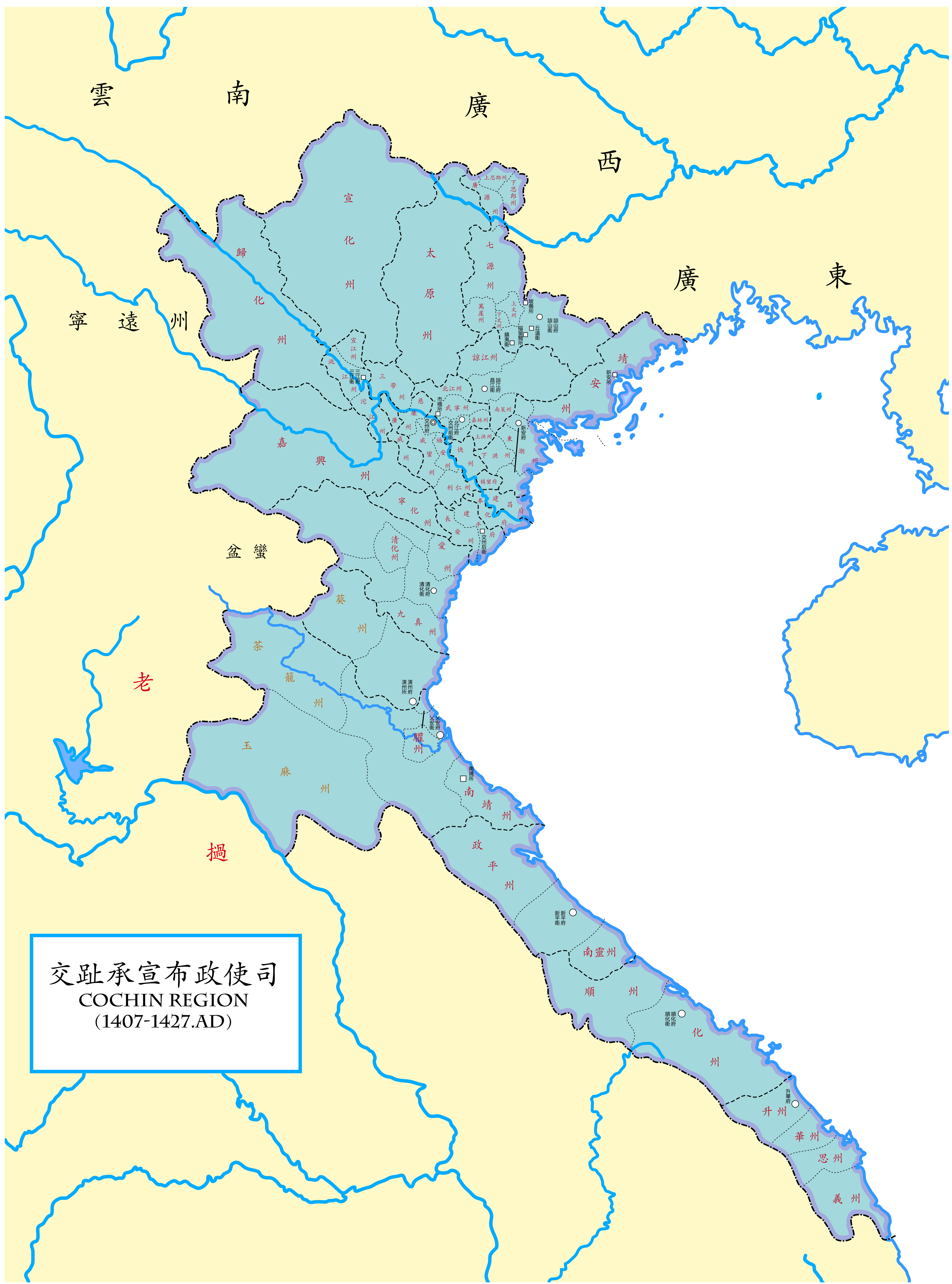
Administrative division of Vietnam (Jiaozhi) under the Ming dynasty from 1407 to 1427.

The Ming dynasty crushed Lê Lợi's rebellion at first but in 1425, the Ming Emperor Zhu Zhanji expressed his opinion that it would be better to restore the Trần dynasty and return to the old tributary relationship as Ming rule in Vietnam was a net financial loss for the Ming and there were more pressing concerns on the northern border. When in 1426, Zhang Fu requested permission to resume command of Ming Jiaozhi army to deal with the worsening situation there, the emperor refused. In 1426, Zhu Zhanji proclaimed a general amnesty and abolished all taxes in Giao Chi except for land taxes to be paid in rice, needed to supply Ming garrisons. In early November 1426, Lê Lợi's 3,000 Vietnamese rebels achieved a surprise victory over the Ming army led by Wang Tong with about 30,000 Chinese soldiers killed or captured in Tốt Động (32 km south of Hanoi). People in the Red River Delta welcomed and supported the Lam Son army where they came.

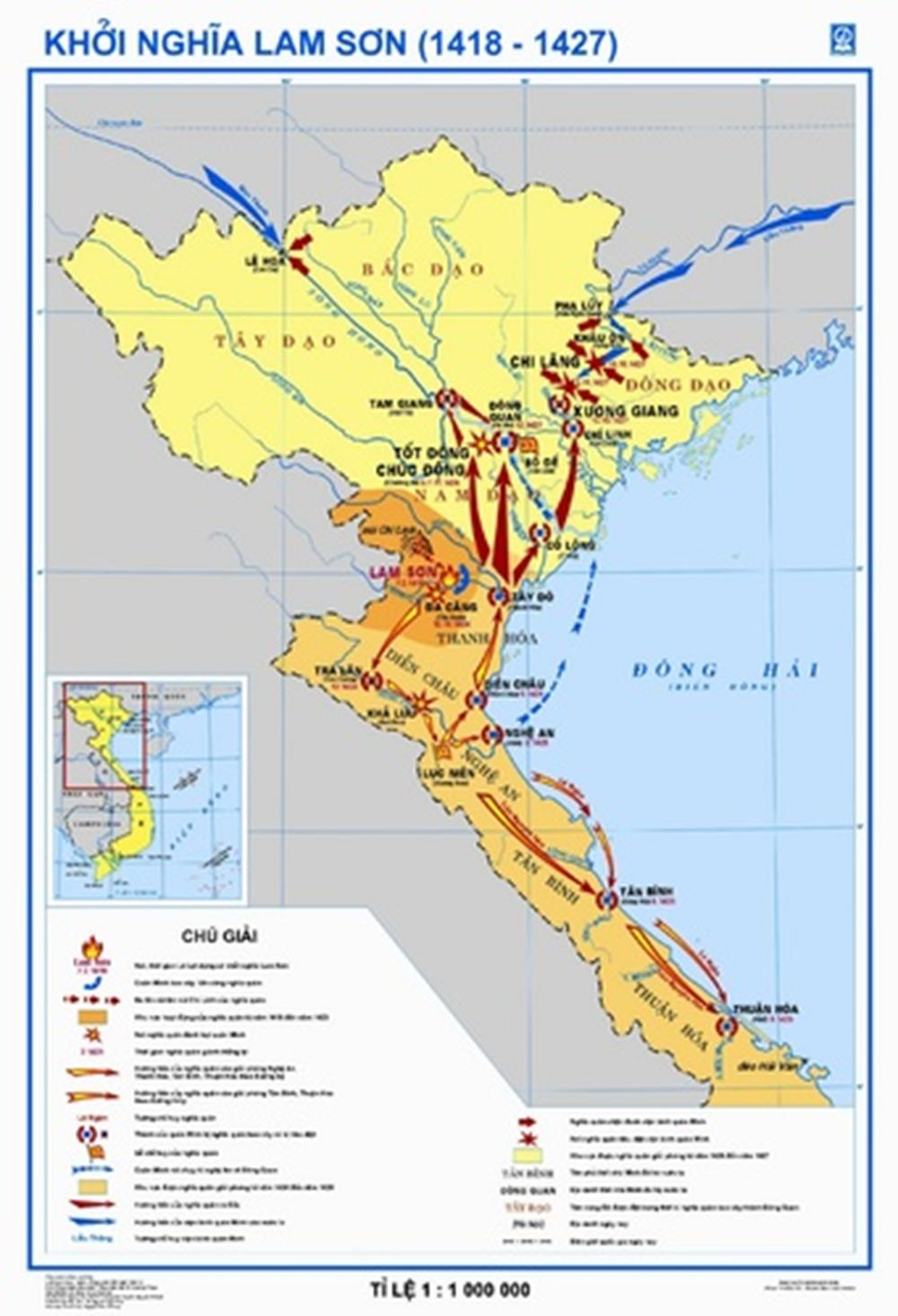
Lam Son uprising (1426–1428)

By 1427, captured northern prisoners also furnished the rebels with siege techniques, primitive tanks, flying horse carts, Muslim trebuchets (hui hui pao, 回回砲), and possibly another artillery piece that the Chinese called a "thousand-ball thunder cannon". The Xuande Emperor of the Ming dynasty decided to end the war in Northern Vietnam. After this final victory, the Vietnamese repatriated 86,640 Ming prisoners to China and confiscated all their weapons. China would not again invade its southern neighbor for 360 years. Lê Lợi formally re-established Đại Việt as the Xuande Emperor of the Ming Empire officially recognized Lê Lợi as the king of Annam. In return, Lê Lợi sent diplomatic messages to the Ming imperial court, promising Vietnam's loyalty as a nominate tributary state of China and cooperation. The Ming imperial court accepted this arrangement, much as they accepted the vassal status of Korea under the Joseon dynasty. The case of Vietnamese monarch Lê Lợi showed that it was possible to satisfy Chinese pride while maintaining political independence.

== Military and administration ==
The Ming Chinese built up their colonial administration in Jiaozhi Province. In July 1407, Yongle changed the name of Annam to Jiaozhi – an old Han dynasty designation – and made it a province of China. The provincial government included an administrative office, a surveillance office and a regional military commissioner was established, with Lu Yi (d. 1409) as its military commissioner and Huang Zhong as vice-commissioner. Huang Fu was appointed as both provincial administrator and surveillance commissioner. The Ming seized the kingdom's grain reserves of 13.6 million piculs of rice. The province was further divided into fifteen prefectures, 41 subprefectures and 210 counties. By 1408, 472 military and civil offices had been established to govern over three million people and in excess of two million man (barbarians), and the number of offices peaked at about 1,000 in 1419. In major towns and cities throughout the occupied regions had moats and walls added, and troops alternated between defence and farming duties to provide their own food needs. The Ming occupying army of Jiaozhi consisted of 87,000 regulars, scattered in 39 citadels and towns in Northern Vietnam, but clustered in the Red River Delta area.

Chinese armies had employed firearms before the fifteenth century, but they came to possess superior weapons from Annam during the Vietnamese campaigns of the early fifteenth century. They also captured one of the leading Vietnamese firearms experts, Hồ Nguyên Trừng (1374–1446), the eldest son of Hồ Quý Ly, who was charged with manufacturing their superior muskets and explosive weapons. The Artillery Camp was thus built around these Vietnamese firearm specialists, who instructed Ming soldiers under the supervision of palace eunuchs. The first record of firearm usage in Đại Việt was in 1390 when Vietnamese soldiers used cannons and killed the Cham king Chế Bồng Nga.

The Ming government enjoyed some support from the Vietnamese, at least in the capital of Thăng Long, but their efforts to assert control in the surrounding countryside were met with stiff resistance. A general popular dissatisfaction with the colonial arrangement seems clear.

=== Ming governors ===
- Provincial administrator (承宣布政使, thừa tuyên bố chính sử)
  - Huang Fu (黃福, Hoàng Phúc) 1407–1424
  - Chen Qia (陳洽, Trần Hiệp) 1424–1426
- Surveillance and prosecution commissioner (提刑按察使, đề hình án sát sử)
  - Huang Fu 1407–1424
  - Chen Qia 1424–1426
- Military commissioner (都指揮使, đô chỉ huy sử)
  - Lü Yi (呂毅, Lã Nghị) 1407–1409
- Commanding officer (總兵官, tổng binh quân)
  - Zhu Neng (朱能, Chu Năng) Sep–Dec 1406
  - Zhang Fu (張輔, Trương Phụ) 1407–1417
  - Mu Sheng (沐晟, Mộc Thạnh) 1408–1415
  - Li Bin (李彬, Lý Bân) 1417–1422
  - Wang Tong (王通, Vương Thông) May 1426–June 1428
  - Liu Sheng (柳升, Liễu Thăng) 1427

== Sinicization ==
An entry in the Ming Shilu (明實錄) dated 15 August 1406 recorded an imperial order from Emperor Yongle that instructed for Vietnamese records such as maps and registers to be saved and preserved by the Chinese army:

己未敕征討安南總兵官成國公朱能等曰師入安南下郡邑凡得文籍圖志皆勿毀。

In addition, according to Yueqiaoshu (越嶠書, Việt kiệu thư), a source written nearly 2 centuries after the events described, on August 21, 1406, the Yongle Emperor issued an order to Ming soldiers in Annam:

兵入。除釋道經板經文不燬。外一切書板文字以至俚俗童蒙所習。如上大人丘乙已之類。片紙隻字悉皆燬之。其境內中國所立碑刻則存之。但是安南所立者悉壞之。一字不存。 "Once our army enters Annam, except Buddhist and Taoist text; all books and notes, including folklore and children book, should be burnt. The stelae erected by China should be protected carefully, while those erected by Annam, should be completely annihilated. Do not spare even one character."

On the 21st day of the 5th lunar month of the following year, Emperor Yongle issued another order to Ming soldiers in Annam:

屢嘗諭爾凡安南所有一切書板文字。以至俚俗童蒙所習。如上大人丘乙已之類。片紙隻字及彼處自立碑刻。見者即便毀壞勿存。今聞軍中所得文字不即令軍人焚毀。必檢視然後焚之。且軍人多不識字。若一一令其如此。必致傳遞遺失者多。爾今宜一如前敕。號令軍中但遇彼處所有一應文字即便焚毀。毋得存留。 "I have repeatedly told you all to burnt all Annamese books, including folklore and children books and the local stelae should be destroyed immediately upon sight. Recently I heard our soldiers hesitated and read those books before burning them. Most soldiers do not know how to read, so it will be a waste of our time. Now you have to strictly obey my previous command, and burn all local books upon sight without hesitation.

The Chinese colonists promoted Ming Confucian ideology, bureaucratic practices, and Classical Chinese study among the local Vietnamese people, forcing them to wear Chinese-style clothes. The Ming forbade local customs such as tattooing, unmarried boys and girls wearing short hair, and women wearing short skirts, in "order to change customs in conformity with the north." Cultural incorporation was pursued with the new Jiaozhi administration advising the Ming court:

The yi people of Annam venerate the law of the Buddha, but do not know to worship or sacrifice the spirits. We should establish altars for sacrifice to the spirits of the wind, clouds, thunder and rain... so that the people become familiar with the way to express gratitude to the spirits through sacrifice.

In 1416, a large number of Confucian school, Yin-yang schools and medical schools were established within the province. Examinations for local bureaucracy were formalised in 1411. Chinese mourning rites and mourning leave were instituted among the official of Jiaozhi in 1419. For the first time, Đại Việt experienced the sustained influence of Neo-Confucian ideology, which not only included the traditional doctrines of filial piety but also demanded an "activist, state-oriented service" based on officials' absolute loyalty to the dynasty and on the moral superiority of the "civilized" over the "barbarian" as the Ming viewed the Vietnamese as barbarians. Yongle brought Vietnamese students to the National Institution at the Ming capital and appointed more natives to the minor local offices in Jiaozhi. The Ming also destroyed or brought to the north many Vietnamese vernacular writing, historical and classic texts.

After regaining independence, Vietnamese monarch Lê Thánh Tông issued a royal edict in 1474 to forbid the Vietnamese from adopting foreign languages, hairstyles and clothes like the Laotians, Chams and abolished the Ming forced customs. The Mongol, Cham, and Ming invasions of 13th-15th centuries destroyed many Vietnamese important sites, buildings, artifacts, and archives of the Postclassical period.

== Economy ==
Ming goals in Jiaozhi also included labor control and economic exploitation. Imperial orders dispatched in early 1407 required that:

When the troops overcome Annam, enquire far and wide within the borders for knowledgeable and moral men, as well as those who have abilities which can used or skills which can be employed. Such person could, with due ceremony, all be sent to the Court.

The Ming government began a harsh rule of both colonization and sinicization. In October 1407, 7700 tradesmen and artisans from Đại Việt were sent to Beijing. The importance of goods and revenues to be derived from Đại Việt's formerly flourishing maritime trade was not ignored from the Ming administration. In order to draw revenues from their new province, the Chinese established or revived commercial taxes offices, fishing tax offices, transport offices and salt tax offices. New gold-mining offices were established in 1408 to supervise the extraction and/or taxation of gold. The impositions on the indigenous populations must have been severe, through a 1411 announcement. Private exports of metal and aromatic products were banned in 1416. Valuable artifacts such as gems, jade, gold, pieces of art as well as craftsmen were transported to China. The Chinese had greatly encouraged the development and the use of gold and silver mines. But right after the silver and gold were extracted they impounded them and sent a fraction of these minerals to Beijing. They also imposed salt taxes, but a slightly heavier tax against those who produced salt in Annam. Yongle also repeatedly exacted from his newly conquered subjects such as local specialties as tropical green feathers, gold, paints, fans, silk fabrics, and a special sandalwood called the sumu that was used for building doors in the new palace and from whose bark a red dye was extracted.

Through Yongle's reign, Jiaozhi was never able to provide enough rice to support the large occupation force of Chinese troops, with the consequence that the new province continued to be a drain on Chinese resources, rather than a source of revenue.

== See also ==
- Vietnam under Chinese rule
- Ming conquest of Đại Ngu
- Lam Sơn uprising
- Bình Ngô đại cáo

== Sources ==
- Andaya, Barbara Watson; Andaya, Leonard Y. (2015). A History of Early Modern Southeast Asia, 1400-1830. Cambridge University Press. ISBN 9780521889926.
- Anderson, James A. (2020), "The Ming invasion of Vietnam, 1407-1427", in Kang, David C.; Haggard, Stephan (eds.), East Asia in the World: Twelve Events That Shaped the Modern International Order, Cambridge: Cambridge University Press, pp. 87–100, ISBN 978-1-108-47987-5
- Aung-Thwin, Michael Arthur; Hall, Kenneth R. (2011). New Perspectives on the History and Historiography of Southeast Asia: Continuing Explorations. Routledge. ISBN 978-1-136-81964-3.
- Baldanza, Kathlene (2016). Ming China and Vietnam: Negotiating Borders in Early Modern Asia. Cambridge University Press. ISBN 978-1316531310.
- Chan, Hok-lam (2008), "The Chien-wen, Yung-lo, Hung-hsi, and Hsiian-te reigns, 1399 - 1435", in Twitchett, Denis Crispin; Fairbank, John K. (eds.), The Cambridge History of China: Volume 7, The Ming Dynasty, Cambridge: Cambridge University Press, pp. 182–284, ISBN 978-0-521-24333-9
- Dutton, George; Werner, Jayne; Whitmore, John K., eds. (2012). Sources of Vietnamese Tradition. Introduction to Asian Civilizations (illustrated ed.). Columbia University Press. ISBN 978-0231511100.
- Cordier, Henri; Yule, Henry, eds. (1993). The Travels of Marco Polo: The Complete Yule-Cordier Edition : Including the Unabridged Third Edition (1903) of Henry Yule's Annotated Translation, as Revised by Henri Cordier, Together with Cordier's Later Volume of Notes and Addenda (1920). Courier Corporation. ISBN 9780486275871.
- Kiernan, Ben (2019). Việt Nam: a history from earliest time to the present. Oxford University Press. ISBN 978-0-190-05379-6.
- Kyong-McClain, Jeff; Du, Yongtao (2013). Chinese History in Geographical Perspective. Rowman & Littlefield. ISBN 978-0-7391-7230-8.
- Miksic, John Norman; Yian, Goh Geok (2016). Ancient Southeast Asia. Routledge. ISBN 978-0415735544.
- Li, Tana (2018). Nguyen Cochinchina: Southern Vietnam in the Seventeenth and Eighteenth Centuries. Cornell University Press. ISBN 9781501732577.
- Lieberman, Victor (2003). Strange Parallels: Volume 1, Integration on the Mainland: Southeast Asia in Global Context, c.800–1830. Cambridge University Press. ISBN 978-1-139-43762-2.
- Lockhart, Bruce M.; Duiker, William J. (14 April 2010). The A to Z of Vietnam. Scarecrow Press. ISBN 978-1-4617-3192-4.
- Sun, Laichen (2003). "Military Technology Transfers from Ming China and the Emergence of Northern Mainland Southeast Asia (c. 1390-1527)". Journal of Southeast Asian Studies. 34 (3): 495–517. doi:10.1017/S0022463403000456. JSTOR 20072535. S2CID 162422482.
- Taylor, K. W. (2013). A History of the Vietnamese. Cambridge University Press. ISBN 978-0-521-87586-8.
- Tsai, Shih-shan Henry (1996). The Eunuchs in the Ming Dynasty. SUNY Press. ISBN 0-791-42687-4.
- Tsai, Shih-shan Henry (2011). Perpetual Happiness: The Ming Emperor Yongle. University of Washington Press. ISBN 978-0-295-80022-6.
- Wang, Gungwu (1998), "Ming foreign relations: Southeast Asia", in Twitchett, Denis Crispin; Fairbank, John K. (eds.), The Cambridge History of China: Volume 8, The Ming Dynasty, Cambridge: Cambridge University Press, pp. 301–332, ISBN 0-521-24333-5
- Wade, Geoff; Sun, Laichen (2010). Southeast Asia in the Fifteenth Century: The China Factor. Hong Kong University Press. ISBN 978-9971-69-448-7.
- ——— (2014), "The "native office" system: A Chinese mechanism for southern territorial expansion over two millennia", in Wade, Geoff (ed.), Asian Expansions: The Historical Experiences of Polity Expansion in Asia, Taylor & Francis, pp. 69–91, ISBN 9781135043537

Preceded by Hồ dynasty Later Trần dynasty	Fourth Chinese domination of Vietnam; 1407–1427	Succeeded by Later Lê dynasty
