= Nguyễn Biểu =

Vietnamese general of Later Trần dynasty

Nguyễn Biểu (chữ Hán: 阮表) (1350 - 1413) was a prominent figure in Vietnamese history, serving as the Home Minister. He was born in Bình Hòa, Chi La, Nghệ An, and later moved to Yên Hồ, Đức Thọ, Hà Tĩnh (formerly part of Nghệ Tĩnh) city.

== Biography ==
Nguyễn Biểu studied under the Thai teacher and served as the money censor under Trần Thi Điển. In 1413, during the Chongqing Optical period, Minister Minh Truong Phu attacked Nghe An, and King Quang Trung retreated to Hoa Chau. Nguyễn Biểu was sent to negotiate with Truong Phu. To test his courage, Truong Phu presented him with a plate of boiled human heads and shouted at him. Nguyễn Biểu remained calm, ate the meal with dignity, and responded with a poem. This angered Truong Phu, who ordered him to be tied to the wrong Lam bridge and drowned in the rising tide. Nghe Tinh People's Domain established shrines to worship him as "That Great."

== Notable works ==
Nguyễn Biểu authored several poems, including "Human Head Feast." In 1413, during the conflict with the Ming army, King Trùng Quang retreated to Hóa Châu and sent Nguyễn Biểu to meet Trương Phụ in an attempt to reconcile and buy time for Đặng Dung and Nguyễn Cảnh Dị to gather their forces. During the meal, Truong Phu served Nguyen Bieu a boiled human head on a tray as a threat. However, Nguyễn Biểu's expression showed enjoyment while consuming the "northern troop head." Furthermore, he composed a poem titled "Human Head Feast" during the meal.

- Quang Trung faced a challenge regarding his poetic painting porcelain.
- An additional copy of the work was made by the collective of Hoàng in Nghệ Tĩnh.

== Death ==
Nguyễn Biểu died in 1413 at the age of 63 after an illness.

Temple of Nguyễn Biểu

Following the victory over Ming's army, King Le Thai To constructed the Nguyễn Biểu temple in Nội Diên (now located in Yên Hồ Commune, Đức Thọ District). He honored Nguyễn Biểu by naming him as the king of onus.

During the reign of King Le Thanh Tong, a temple dedicated to Nguyễn Biểu was built in Bình Hồ. Unfortunately, by the end of the 18th century, the temple was destroyed by fire.

In 1869, the local people undertook the restoration of the temple.

In 1968, the lower zone of the temple and the roof of the middle zone were destroyed by a bomb from the US army. The temple has been subject to theft on several occasions, resulting in the loss of two wooden statues.

The Nguyễn Biểu temple was officially recognized as a national historical monument in 1991. Over the years, the temple has undergone several renovations, with the state restoring the middle zone in 2007.
