= Đặng Dung =

Đặng Dung (Chữ Hán: 鄧容, 1373–1414) was the poet and general of the later Tran Dynasty in Vietnamese history.

== Biography ==
Đặng Dung was born in Ta Ha Commune, Thien Loc District, Nghe An (now Can Loc District, Ha Tinh Province). He was the eldest son of Dang Tat.

During the short-lived Ho dynasty, Đặng Dung assisted his father in governing Thuận Hóa. However, when the Ming army occupied the country (then known as Đại Ngu), the Hồ Dynasty collapsed. In response, Đặng Dung and his father participated in the insurrection led by Trần Ngỗi, also known as Giản Định Đế.

In 1409, following the war in Bô Cô (Hiếu Cổ commune, Ý Yên district, now Nam Định Province), Emperor Giản Định, influenced by the words of eunuchs Nguyễn Quỹ and Nguyễn Mộng Trang, who accused Đặng Tất of being an autocrat, ordered the execution of Đặng Tất and Nguyễn Cảnh Chân. Outraged by these events, Đặng Dung left Trần Ngỗi and, along with Nguyễn Cảnh Di (son of Nguyễn Cảnh Chân), led the troops from Thuận Hóa to Thanh Hóa and successfully depose the emperor. Trần Quý Khoáng was then crowned emperor.

In 1413, when the Ming forces launched an offensive against Thanh Hóa and Nghệ An, both Giản Định and Trần Quý Khoáng's armies retreated to the mountains and forests. Eventually, Trần Quý Khoáng and his entire clan were captured in 1413. In solidarity, Đặng Dung chose to take his own life alongside Trần Quý Khoáng.
