= Later Trần dynasty =

Vietnamese dynasty

Great Việt 大越 Đại Việt
- 1407–1413
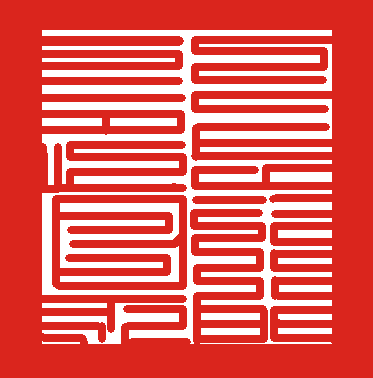
- Imperial seal
- Status: Unrecognized proto-state
- Capital: Mô Độ (1407–1409); Bình Than (1409–1413)
- Common languages: Literary Chinese; Vietnamese
- Religion: Buddhism (official), Taoism, Confucianism, Vietnamese folk religion
- Government: Monarchy
- Emperor
  - 1407–1409: Giản Định Đế (first)
  - 1409–1413: Trùng Quang Đế (last)
- Historical era: Postclassical Era
  - Established: 1407
  - Disestablished: 1413
- Currency: Copper-alloy cash coins
Preceded by	Succeeded by
Fourth Era of Northern Domination	Fourth Era of Northern Domination
- Today part of: Vietnam

The Later Trần dynasty (Vietnamese: Nhà Hậu Trần, chữ Nôm: 茹後陳; Sino-Vietnamese: triều Hậu Trần, chữ Hán: 朝後陳), officially Great Việt (Vietnamese: Đại Việt; chữ Hán: 大越), was a Vietnamese dynasty. It was the continuous line of the Tran dynasty that led Vietnamese rebellions against the Chinese Ming dynasty from between 1407 and 1413. The regime was characterized by two revolts against the Ming China which had by then established its rule over Vietnam.

== History ==
=== First phase (1407–1409) ===
The Ming conquest of Đại Việt in 1406–1407 was undertaken with the stated aim of overthrowing Hồ Quý Ly and restoring the earlier Trần dynasty. Instead, it resulted in the collapse of Đại Việt’s independence and the incorporation of the territory into the Ming Empire as Jiaozhi. According to Ming dynastic chronicles, when no legitimate Trần heir could be identified, the Ming court justified annexation; however, when members of the Trần royal family later emerged and challenged Ming authority, they were disregarded, pressured, and in several cases executed.

The first major Vietnamese uprising against Ming rule began in 1408 under the leadership of Prince Trần Ngỗi. Vietnamese annals identify him as the second son of a former Trần emperor, whereas Ming sources dismissed him as an impostor, at times labeling him a Hmong claimant.

In response, the Yongle Emperor ordered Mu Sheng to suppress the rebellion, mobilizing approximately 40,000 troops from Yunnan, Guangxi, Guizhou, and Sichuan. Ming forces were nevertheless defeated by Trần Ngỗi’s guerrilla operations. Preoccupied with ongoing campaigns against the Mongols, the Yongle Emperor replaced Mu Sheng with Zhang Fu on 23 February 1409.

Zhang Fu reorganized Ming forces, deploying 47,000 troops and a fleet of approximately 8,600 vessels seized during the 1407 campaign. In September 1409, Ming forces decisively defeated Trần Ngỗi’s estimated 20,000 troops and 600 ships in a naval engagement.

Trần Ngỗi was captured in December 1409 and sent to Nanjing, where he was executed. Leadership of the resistance subsequently passed to his nephew, Trần Quý Khoáng.

Trần Quý Khoáng dispatched two diplomatic missions to the Yongle Emperor seeking formal recognition. The first group of envoys was executed, while the second was received after presenting gold and silver statues as symbolic substitutes for Trần Quý Khoáng’s personal appearance at court. The Yongle Emperor appointed Hồ Nguyên Trừng, son of Hồ Quý Ly and a Ming court official, to interrogate the envoys.

One envoy disclosed details of the resistance to Hồ and accepted Ming terms under which Trần Quý Khoáng would be appointed Provincial Commissioner of Jiaozhi, while the envoy himself would be made magistrate of Nghệ An. Upon their return, however, Trần Quý Khoáng ordered the execution of the envoy who had accepted the Ming appointment, reportedly angered by the acceptance of an inferior office on his behalf.

=== Second phase and defeat (1409–1414) ===
Resistance sparked again under Trần Quý Khoáng, who managed to gather more followers over time. Because of that, the Ming leadership called upon Zhang Fu once more to head back into Jiaozhi and deal with rising unrest. According to official Ming records, he did not recognize their control, seeing himself as central to determining Đại Việt's future path.

Somewhere near Nam Định, fighting broke out on 12 February 1411 when Zhang Fu led about 24,000 soldiers into rebel territory. Rebel losses, so say the Ming reports, reached nearly 4,500 dead while another 2,000 ended up taken prisoner.

By early August that year, General Zhang Sheng guided a separate imperial force deep into Thanh Hóa province. Clashes there saw rivercraft smashed - roughly 160 destroyed, it's said - and 120 more seized by Ming units. Exact numbers of enemy fighters lost remain unclear; historical tallies often stretch beyond belief.

Despite being increasingly outnumbered and outgunned, Trần Quý Khoáng and his followers continued to resist Ming forces through guerrilla warfare, exploiting local terrain and withdrawing into Cambodian territory when necessary. By the end of 1413, his forces had reportedly suffered losses of 60–70 percent and were compelled to raid Ming granaries for food and supplies. Trần Quý Khoáng, along with his wife and brother, was captured by Ming forces on 30 March 1414. He was subsequently transported to Nanjing and executed on 16 August 1414.

== Monarchs ==
- Giản Định Đế (簡定帝), r. 1407–1409
- Trùng Quang Đế (重光帝), r. 1409–1413

Preceded by Hồ dynasty	Dynasty of Vietnam; 1407–1413	Succeeded by Fourth Chinese rule
