= Luocheng =

Luocheng (Chinese: t: 羅城, s: 罗城, p Luóchéng, lit. "Enclosing Wall" or "City"), formerly romanized as Lo-ch'eng, may refer to:

== Places ==
- La Thành, the name of several historical Chinese fortifications along the Red River in the area of present-day Hanoi, Vietnam, including Longbian, Songping, and the present city, particularly
  - Đại La, a fortress around which present Hanoi grew up
- Luocheng, Hui'an County, county seat, under the jurisdiction of the prefecture-level city of Quanzhou, Fujian Province, China.
- Luocheng County, a short form of Luocheng Mulao Autonomous County, Guangxi, China
- Luocheng, Shaoyang (罗城乡), a township of Shaoyang County, Hunan, China
- Luochengzhen, a township of Qianwei County, Sichuan, China
- Luochengzhen, a township in Wanzai County, Jiangxi, China
- Luocheng Subdistrict, a township of Luoding, Guangdong, China

== People and fictional people ==
=== People ===
- Luo Cheng, general, martial artist, monk, famed spear user, founder of the Temple of Touwushi Guanyin (頭屋石觀音寺) in Touwu Township, Miaoli County, Taiwan.
- Luo Cheng (羅成) (born 1971), politician, formerly Deputy Secretary and County Chief of Fengdu County Committee, Chongqing City.

=== Fictional people ===
- Luo Cheng (罗成), the fictionalized representation of the son of Luo Yi.
