= La Thành =

La Thành is the Vietnamese form of the Chinese placename Luocheng (Chinese: t 羅城, s 罗城, p Luóchéng, lit. "Enclosing Wall" or "City"), formerly romanized as Lo-chʻeng.

It may refer to:

- Long Biên (Chinese: Longbian), within present-day Hanoi
- Tống Bình (Chinese: Songping), within present-day Hanoi
- Thăng Long, Hanoi proper, particularly
  - Đại La, the old fortress around which the city grew up
- Other Luochengs within China
