= Citadel of the Hồ Dynasty =

UNESCO World Heritage site in Thanh Hóa, Vietnam

Citadel of the Ho Dynasty
UNESCO World Heritage Site
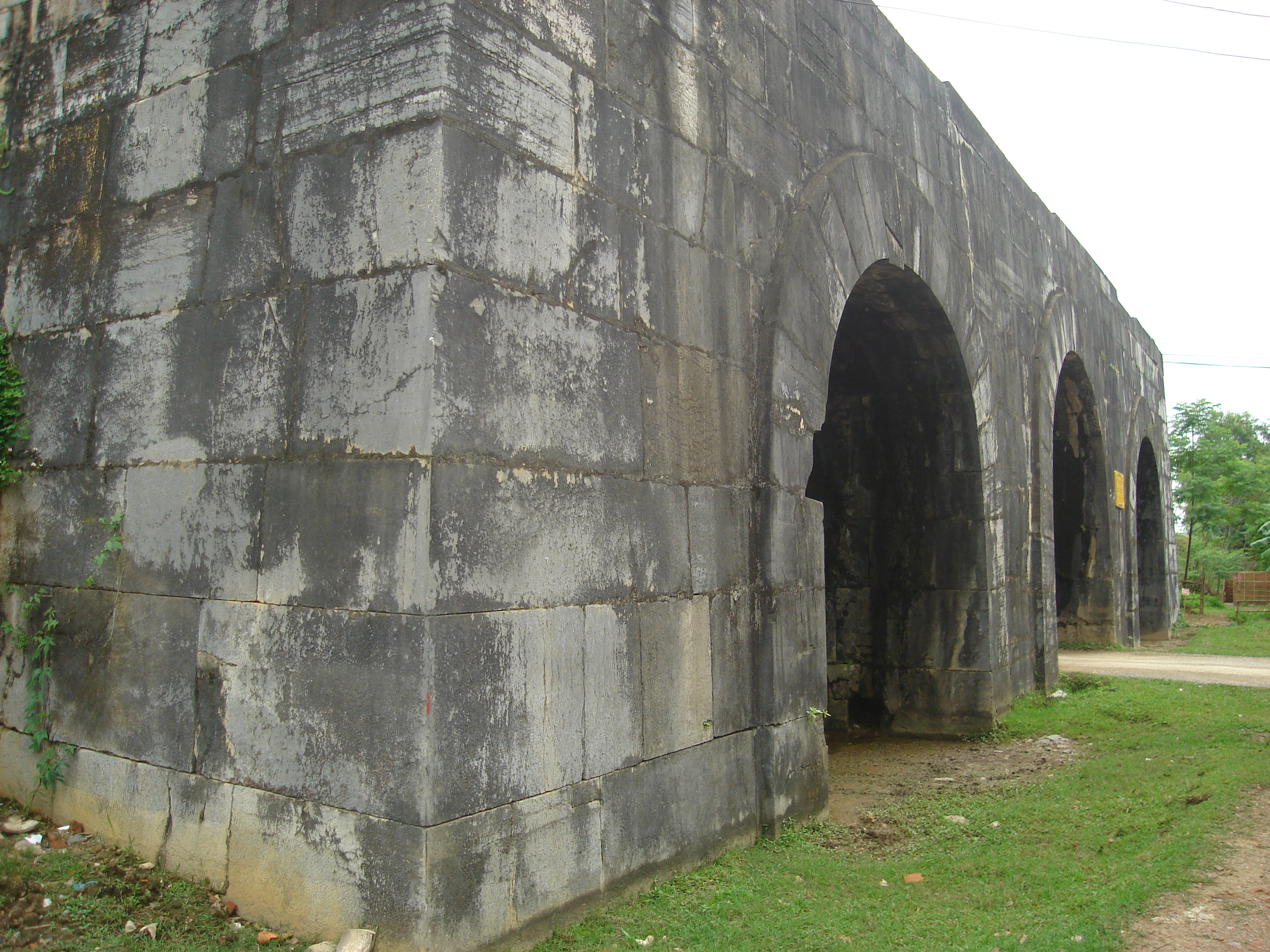
- The South (fore) gate of Tay Do castle

- Location within Vietnam
- Location: Tây Giai, Vĩnh Lộc District, Thanh Hóa Province, North Central Coast, Vietnam
- Includes: 1. Inner Citadel; 2. La Thanh Outer Walled Section; 3. Nam Giao Altar
- Criteria: Cultural: (ii), (iv)
- Reference: 1358
- Inscription: 2011 (35th Session)
- Area: 155.5 ha (384 acres)
- Buffer zone: 5,078.5 ha (12,549 acres)
- Coordinates: 20°4′41″N 105°36′17″E

The Citadel of the Hồ Dynasty (Vietnamese: Thành nhà Hồ, chữ Nho: 城茹胡; also called Tây Đô/西都 castle or Tây Giai castle) is a 15th-century stone fortress in Thanh Hóa province, Vietnam. It served as the western capital of the Hồ dynasty (1398–1407) while also being an important political, economic, and cultural centre in the 16th to the 18th century. It is located in modern Tây Giai commune, Vĩnh Lộc District, in Thanh Hóa Province, in Vietnam's North Central Coast region.

Tây Đô castle is rectangular in shape. Its north-south side is 870.5 m (2,856 ft) in length and its east-west side is 883.5 m (2,899 ft) in length. There are four gates: one at the south (fore gate), one at the north (back gate), one at the east (left gate), and one at the west (right gate). The southern gate is 9.5 m (31 ft) high and 15.17 m (49.8 ft) wide. The castle was constructed from stone blocks, each of which is 2×1×0.7 m (6.6×3.3×2.3 ft) in size on average. Except for its gates, the castle is mostly ruined.

The citadel was built in 1397. It was composed of an Inner Citadel made of limestone, the La Thanh Outer Wall and a 155 hectare altar. The design and decoration of architectural elements in terms of space management was meant to showcase a centralized imperial city ruled by royal power, based on Confucianism mixed with a Buddhist culture. The construction of the castle was built according to fengshui principles. The citadel was inscribed on UNESCO World Heritage Sites on June 27, 2011.

== Archaeology ==
In February 2026, archaeologists uncovered dozens of rare gold-enamelled terracotta artifacts, including intricate gold-glazed Bodhi leaf ornaments decorated with dragon motifs. These 600-year-old gilded materials were found behind a pair of stone dragons at the center of the citadel, a discovery that has finally allowed researchers to accurately locate the main hall (palace area) of the ancient Tay Do Citadel.

== Gallery ==
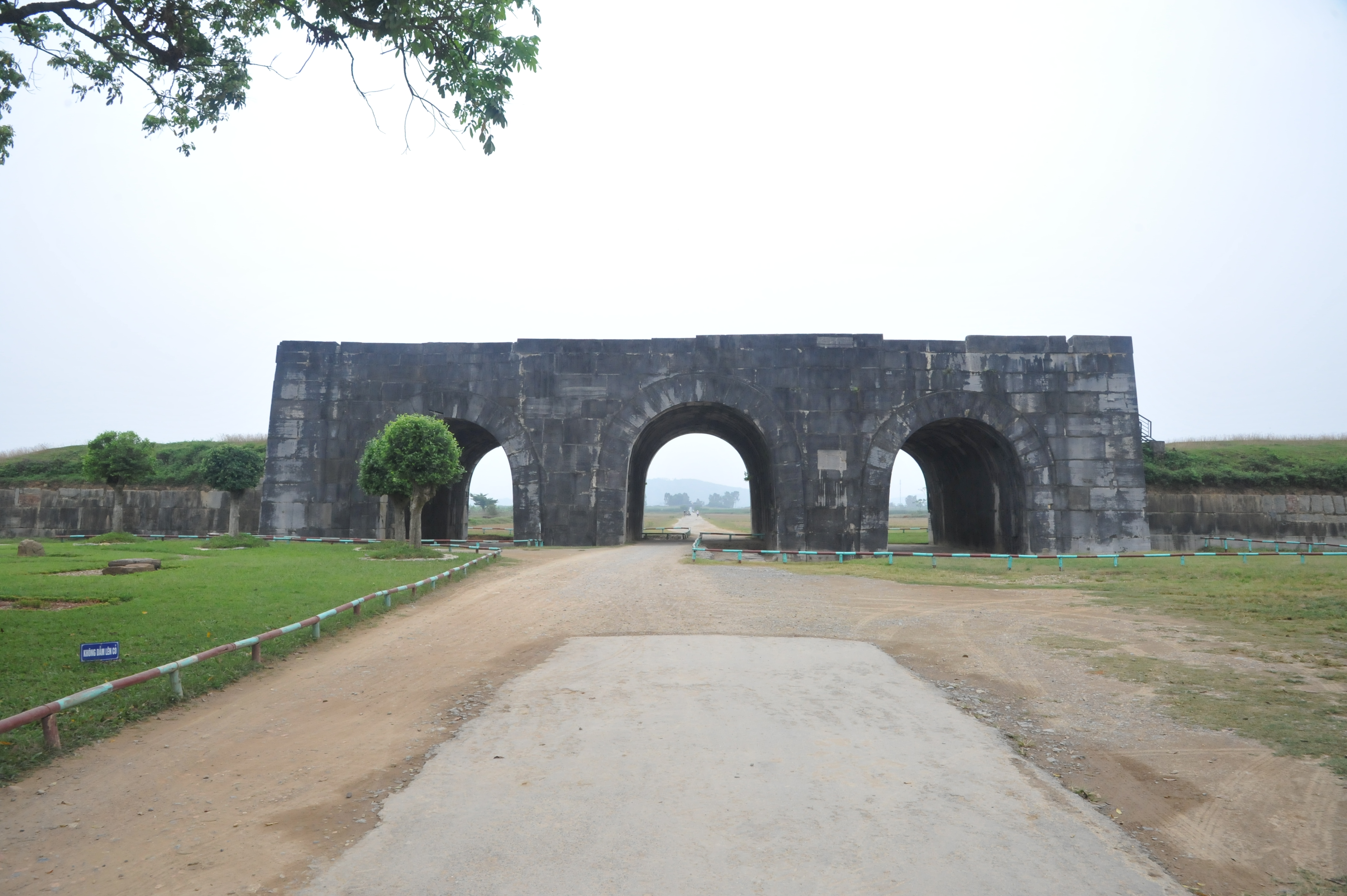
General view

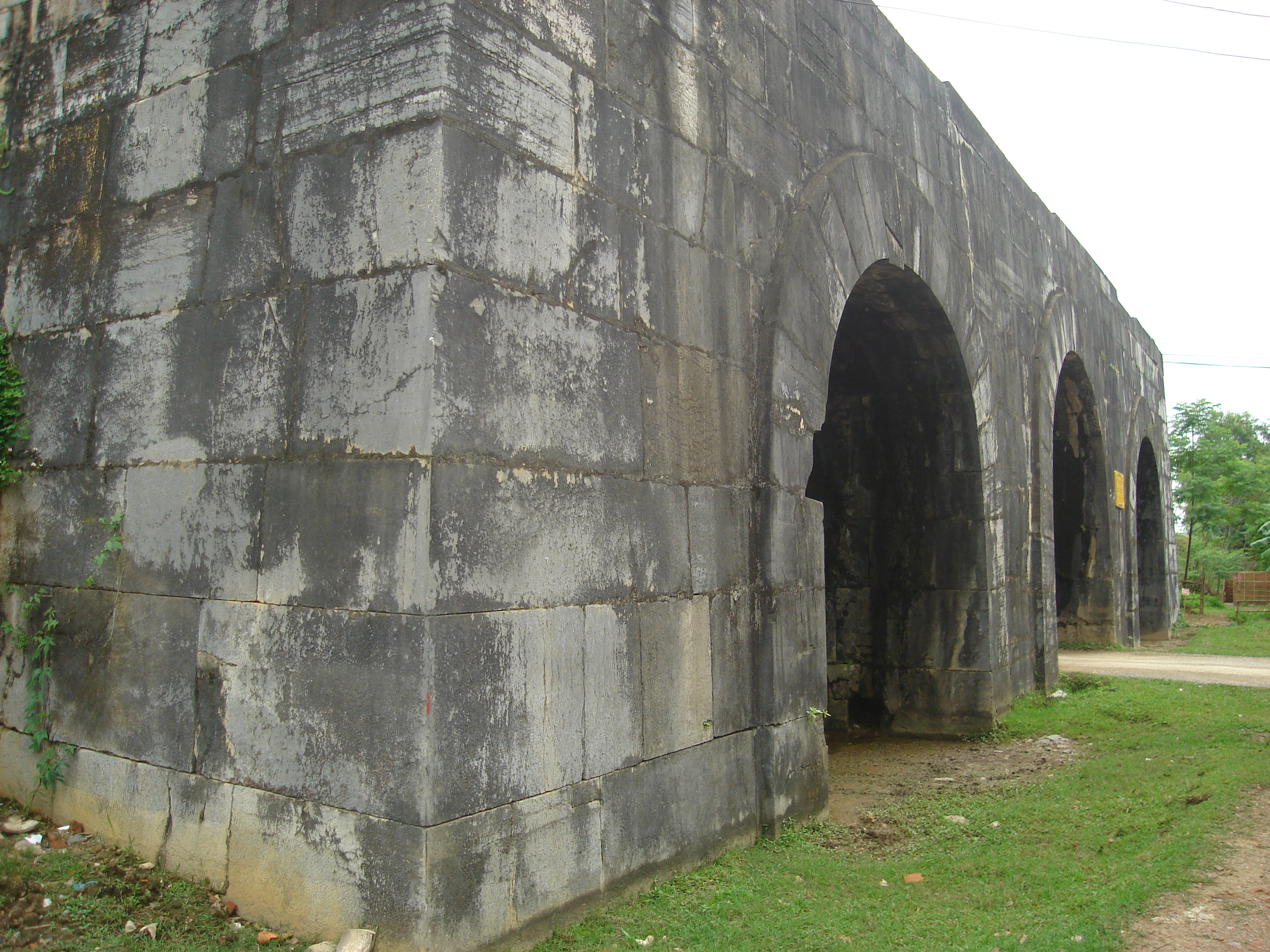
South gate

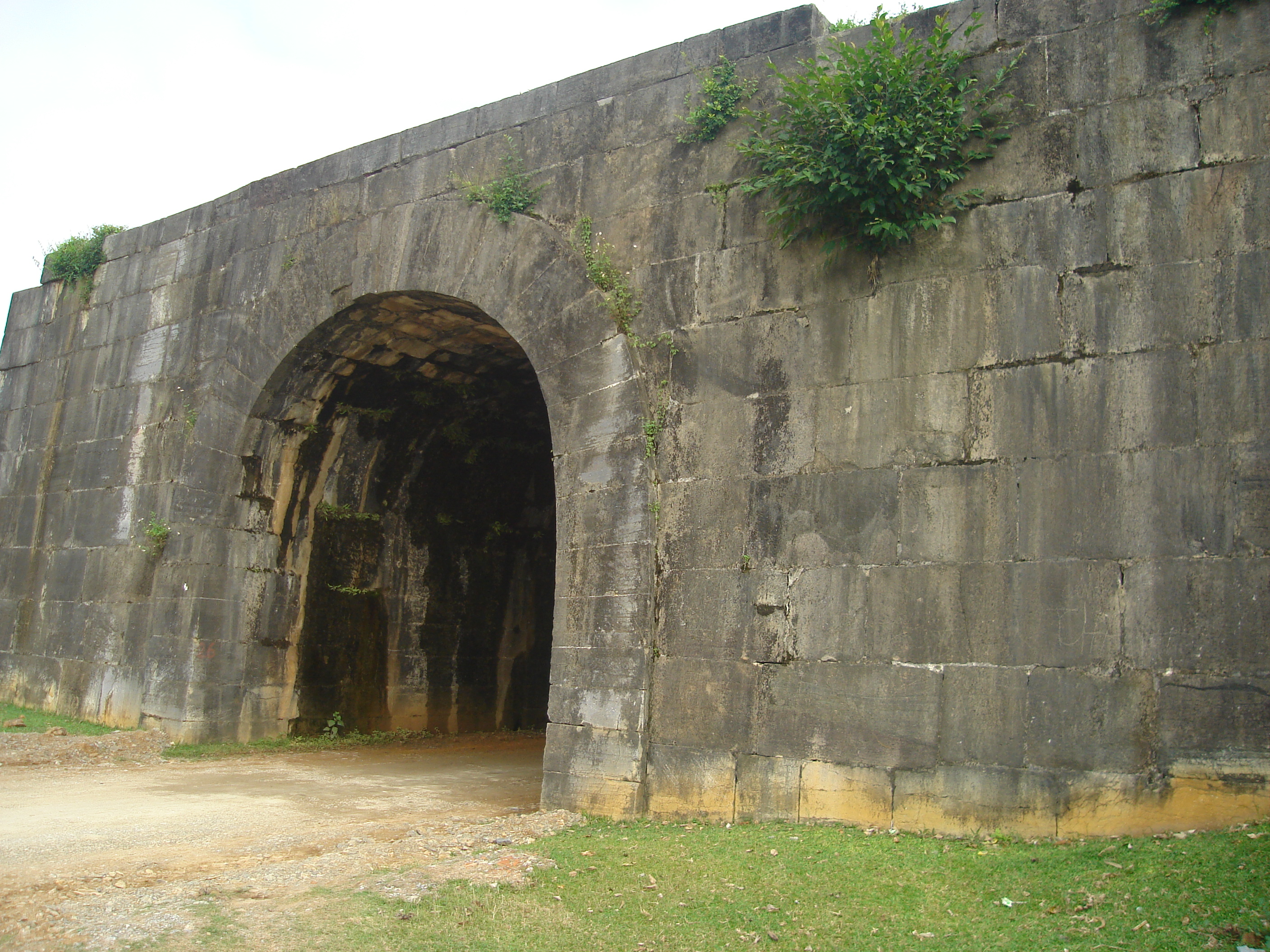
North gate

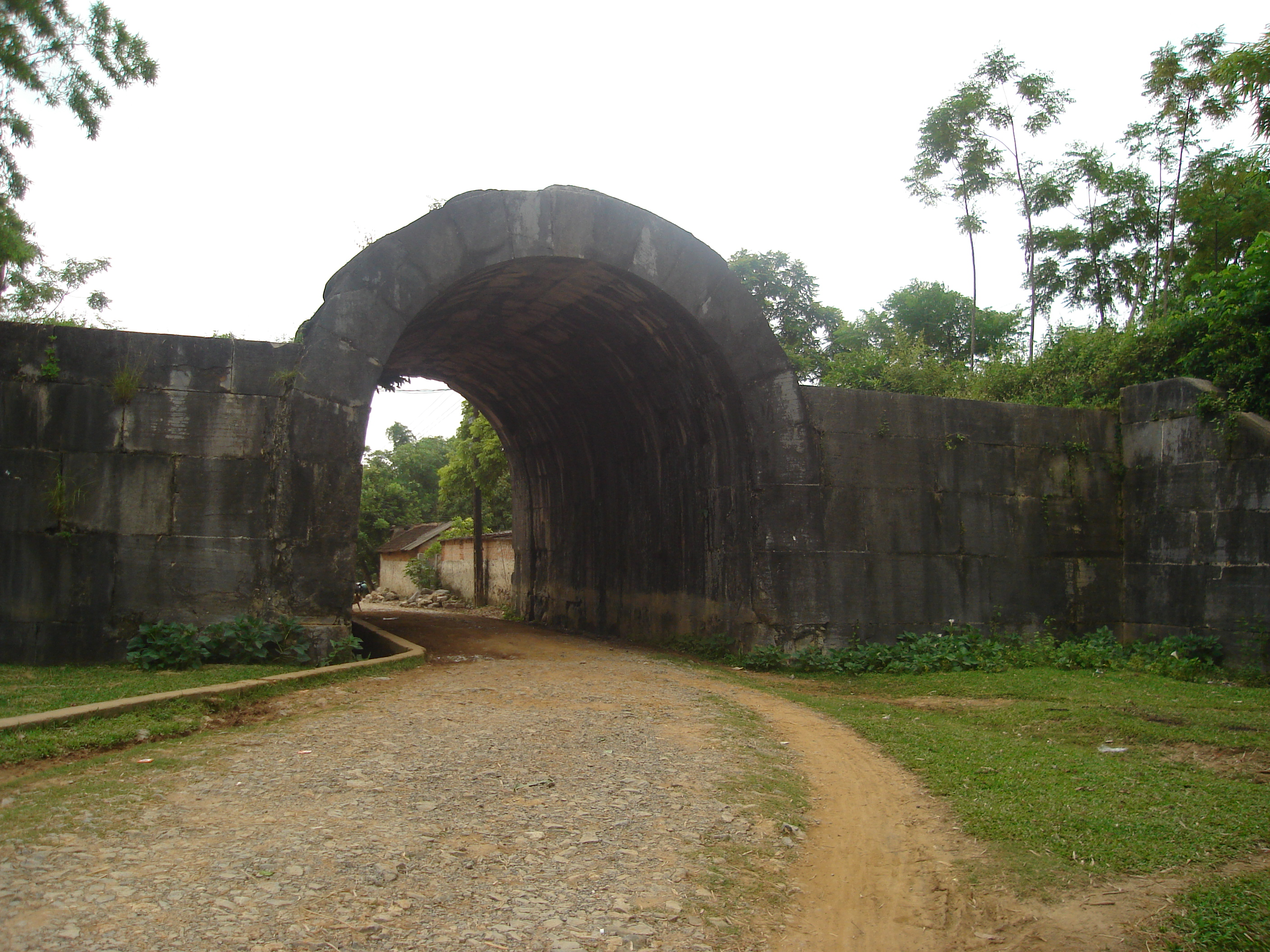
East gate

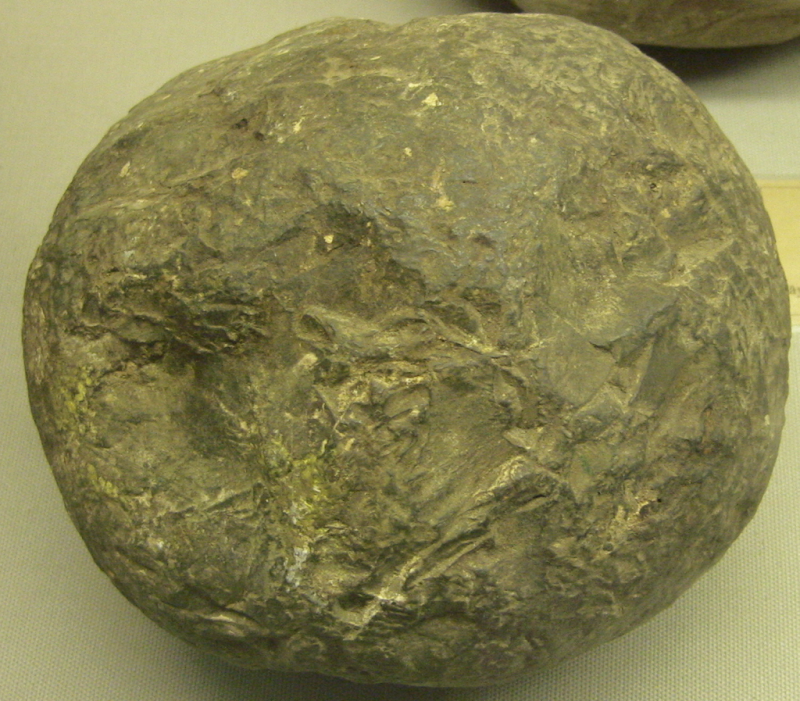
A stone cannonball found in Tây Đô castle

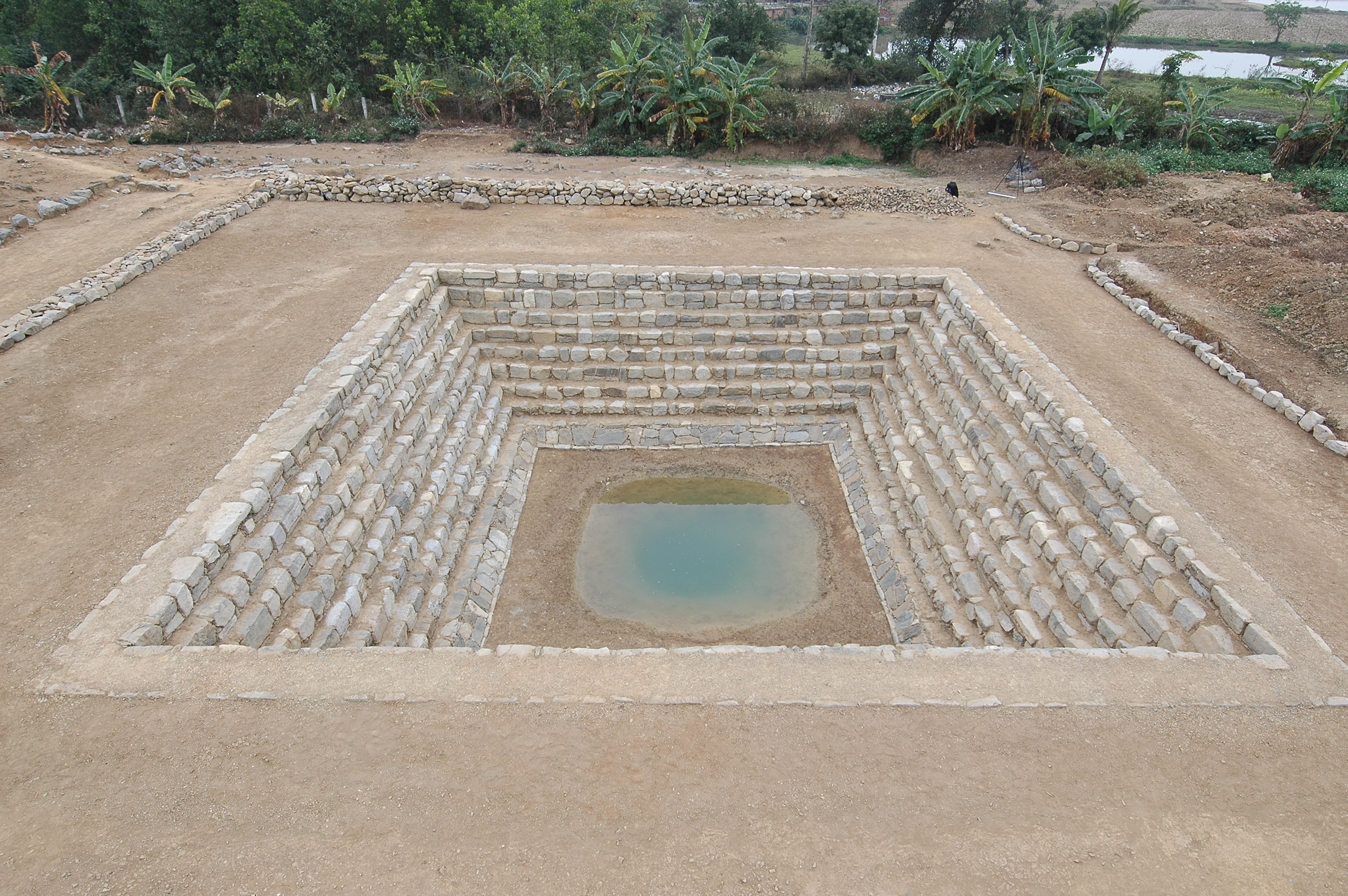
King's Well
