= Mu Sheng =

Chinese military general and politician

- 沐晟

Marquis of Xiping
- In office 1399–1408
- Preceded by: Mu Chun
- Succeeded by: Title changed

Duke of Qian
- In office 1408–1438
- Preceded by: Title changed
- Succeeded by: Mu Bin

Personal details
- Born: 1368
- Died: 1439 (aged 70–71) Chuxiong, Yunnan, Ming China
- Spouse: Lady Cheng
- Children: Mu Bin; Princess Consort Gonghui of Zhao
- Parent: Mu Ying (father)
- Occupation: Military general, politician
- Courtesy name: Jingmao (景茂)
- Posthumous name: Zhongjing (忠敬)

Mu Sheng (Chinese: 沐晟; Vietnamese: Mộc Thạnh; 1368–1439), courtesy name Jingmao (景茂), was a Chinese military general and politician of the Ming dynasty.

Mu Sheng was the second son of Mu Ying, the first Marquis of Xiping (西平侯). He was a solemn man of few words, and the Hongwu Emperor very liked him. In 1399, his elder brother Mu Chun died without heir, so Mu Sheng succeeded him as Marquis of Xiping.

Mu was dispatched to attack Vietnam together with Zhang Fu in 1406. In the next year, they captured the Vietnamese usurper Hồ Quý Ly, and his son Hồ Hán Thương. Vietnam was once again ruled by China and renamed to Jiaozhi province (Vietnamese: Giao Chỉ). For this accomplishment, he was elevated to the title "Duke of Qian" (黔國公).

In 1408, Trần Ngỗi, a Vietnamese prince, revolted against Ming China. Mu was dispatched to put down the rebellion, but was defeated. In the next year, Zhang Fu was sent to Vietnam again to support him. It proved that Mu was a general did not have military talents. Zhang captured Trần Ngỗi in 1410 successfully and came back to Nanjing, but Mu failed to put down the rebellion of the other prince, Trần Quý Khoáng, until Zhang Fu came to assist him again. They crushed the rebellion in 1414, and Mu was granted the title of Grand Tutor (太傅).

In 1426, he was sent to Vietnam again together with Liu Sheng to put down the rebellion of Lê Lợi, whom later became the founder of the Later Lê dynasty. Later, Liu was killed by the Vietnamese in Chi Lăng Pass, Mu had to retreat from Vietnam. Finally, the Xuande Emperor decided to abandon Jiaozhi Province, and the Vietnamese gained political independence once again.

Mu Sheng took part in the Luchuan–Pingmian campaigns together with Mu Ang (沐昂) and Fang Zheng (方政). Fang Zheng was defeated and killed in action, Mu Sheng had to retreat. He died in Chuxiong. He was elevated to the title "Prince of Dingyuan" (定遠王) and given the posthumous name Zhongjing (忠敬) posthumously. His eldest son Mu Bin (沐斌) succeeded as Duke of Qian.

Mu Sheng House of Duke of Qian Born: 1368 Died: 1439
Chinese nobility
| Preceded by Mu Chun | Marquis of Xiping; 1399–1408 | Succeeded by Title changed |
| Preceded by Title changed | Duke of Qian; 1408–1438 | Succeeded by Mu Bin |
