= Giản Định Đế =

Giản Định Đế 簡定帝
- Emperor of Đại Việt

Emperor of Later Trần Dynasty
- Reign: 1407–1409
- Predecessor: Dynasty established
- Successor: Trùng Quang Đế

Retired Emperor of Later Trần Dynasty
- Born: 1375; Thăng Long, Đại Việt
- Died: 1410 (aged 34–35); Nanjing, Ming China
Names
- Trần Ngỗi (陳頠)
Era dates
- Hưng Khánh (興慶)
- House: Later Trần Dynasty
- Father: Trần Nghệ Tông

Emperor Giản Định (Vietnamese: Giản Định Đế, chữ Hán: 簡定帝, 1375–1410), real name Trần Ngỗi (陳頠), was the leader of the Vietnamese Trần royalist forces who rebelled against the Ming Chinese rule.

Giản Định was the second son of Trần Nghệ Tông, was given the title Giản Định vương (簡定王, "Prince Giản Định"). Ming China conquered Vietnam in 1407, he fled to Mô Độ (modern Yên Mô District, Ninh Bình Province) and revolted against China in September 1408. At first he was defeated by Chinese army, later, he was supported by two Vietnamese generals, Đặng Tất and Nguyễn Cảnh Chân, and occupied Nghệ An Province successfully. Giản Định decided to attack Đông Đô (modern Hanoi) but was opposed by Đặng Tất and Nguyễn Cảnh Chân. Giản Định soon had both Đặng Tất and Nguyễn Cảnh Chân arrested and killed, causing dissent and revolt in his army. Đặng Dung and Nguyễn Cảnh Dị, sons of Đặng Tất and Nguyễn Cảnh Chân respectively, installed Trần Quý Khoáng (Trùng Quang Đế) as the new emperor in Chi La (modern Đức Thọ District, Hà Tĩnh Province).

Giản Định was arrested by Trùng Quang in 1409, and was granted the title thái thượng hoàng ("Retired Emperor"). He was sent to Hạ Hồng (modern Ninh Giang District, Hải Dương Province) to attack Chinese army, but was defeated by Zhang Fu and fled to Diễn Châu. Consequently, the Chinese took him captive and transferred him to Nanjing, where he was beheaded around 1410.

Giản Định Đế House of Trần Born: 1375 Died: 1410
Regnal titles
Preceded by Hồ Hán Thương	Emperor of Vietnam; 1407–1409	Succeeded by Trùng Quang Đế
Preceded by dynasty established	Emperor of Later Trần Dynasty; 1407–1409	Succeeded by Trùng Quang Đế
Vacant Title last held by Hồ Quý Ly	Retired Emperor of Vietnam; 1409–1410	Vacant Title next held by Lê Chiêu Tông
