= Trần Thiêm Bình =

Trần Thiêm Bình (chữ Hán: 陳添平, ?–1406) was a pretender to the Vietnamese throne during Hồ dynasty. He was mentioned as Chen Tian-ping (陳天平) in Chinese records.

According to Đại Việt sử ký toàn thư compiled later in the century, Trần Thiêm Bình was not a real prince, and his real name was Nguyễn Khang (阮康) or Trần Khang (陳康). Bùi Bá Kỳ, a high official of Trần dynasty whom exiled to Ming China, did not know him. Bình was a house servant of Trần Nguyên Huy. He launched a rebellion against Trần dynasty, and was defeated in 1390. He then fled to Ming China and changed his name to Trần Thiêm Bình.

In 1404, Bình arrived at the Ming imperial court in Nanjing, claiming to be a Trần prince, appealing to the court for the restoration of Trần dynasty. In 1406, Yongle Emperor of Ming China, sent 5000 men to escort him back to Vietnam. Ming army led by Huang Zhong (黃中) was ambushed by Vietnamese army in Chi Lăng, and suffered a crushing defeat. Huang Zhong fled back to China, and Trần Thiêm Bình was captured. He was executed by Hồ Quý Ly. According to China's record, however, Huang Zhong handed over Binh under an agreement that Hồ would restore the Tran dynasty under Binh, but in turn broke the promise and killed Binh.

This incident made Yongle angry. Finally, Yongle decided to invade Vietnam.
