= Zhang Fu =

Ming dynasty general (1375–1449)

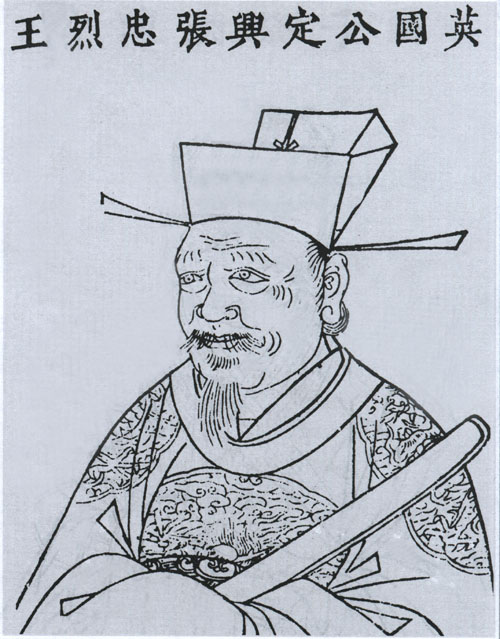
A Ming dynasty illustration of Zhang Fu in the Sancai Tuhui.

Zhang Fu (Chinese: 張輔; Wade–Giles: Chang Fu; Vietnamese: Trương Phụ; 1375–1449), courtesy name Wenbi (Chinese: 文弼), was a Chinese military general of the Ming dynasty. He was the eldest son of general Zhang Yu, one of Zhu Di's (later Yongle Emperor) finest generals. Zhang Yu was killed in the Jingnan campaign, Zhang Fu succeeded his father's title. After Zhu Di crowned the Yongle Emperor, Zhang Fu was granted the title "Count of Xin'an" (信安伯). In 1405, he was elevated to the title "Marquis of Xincheng" (新成侯).

Zhang was dispatched to attack Vietnam together with Mu Sheng (沐晟) in 1406. In the next year, he captured the Vietnamese usurper Hồ Quý Ly, and his son Hồ Hán Thương. He then reported to the emperor that the Trần lineage had been destroyed by Hồ Quý Ly so that there was no successor, and the populace "requested again to be a province of China". Vietnam was annexed by China again and renamed to Jiaozhi province (Vietnamese: Giao Chỉ). For this accomplishment, he was elevated to the title "Duke of Ying" (英國公).

Later, Zhang put down the rebellion of two Vietnamese princes, Trần Ngỗi and Trần Quý Khoáng successfully, but failed to put down a number of revolts among the Vietnamese people against the Ming authorities. One of these rebel leaders was Lê Lợi, who later became the founder of Lê dynasty. Zhang was recalled to Nanjing in 1415.

Zhang followed the Yongle Emperor in several military expeditions against the Mongols. He was granted the title of Grand Preceptor and trusted by the Hongxi Emperor. One of his daughters married Hongxi. He was ordered to participate in superintending the compilation of Taizong Shilu, the imperial annals of the Yongle Emperor. In 1426, he put down the rebellion of Zhu Gaoxu. After the Zhengtong Emperor ascended the throne, he served as one of regents together with Jian Yi (蹇義), Xia Yuanji, Yang Shiqi (楊士奇), Yang Rong (楊榮) and Yang Pu (楊溥). He was killed in the Tumu Crisis together with many high-ranking officials and generals. He was elevated to the title "Prince of Dingxing" (定興王), and given the posthumous name Zhonglie (忠烈 loyal merit) posthumously.
