= Trùng Quang Đế =

Trùng Quang Đế 重光帝
- Emperor of Đại Việt

Emperor of Later Trần Dynasty
- Reign: 17 March 1409 – 31 March 1413 (4 years, 14 days)
- Predecessor: Giản Định Đế
- Successor: surrendered to Ming China
- Born: 1390? Đại Việt
- Died: 14 April 1414; Ming China
Names
- Trần Quý Khoáng (陳季擴)
Era dates
- Trùng Quang (重光)
- House: Later Trần dynasty
- Father: Trần Ngạc, Prince Trang Định

Trùng Quang Emperor (Vietnamese: Trùng Quang Đế, chữ Hán: 重光帝, 1390?–1414), real name Trần Quý Khoáng (陳季擴), was the second and last emperor of Later Trần dynasty. He was a son of prince Trần Ngạc. As the second son of Trần Nghệ Tông, Ngạc was appointed as Prime Minister with the title Trang Định vương (莊定王, "Prince Trang Định"), but was later killed by an order of Co-Prime Minister Hồ Quý Ly in 1392.

Giản Định revolted against dominance of Ming China in September 1408. Trùng Quang was appointed as a Palace Attendant (thị trung). In the next year, he was installed as the new emperor by Đặng Dung and Nguyễn Cảnh Dị in Chi La (modern Đức Thọ District, Hà Tĩnh Province). Giản Định was arrested by Nguyễn Suý, a general of Trùng Quang, then transferred to Nghệ An Province. Trùng Quang granted him the title thái thượng hoàng ("Retired Emperor").

Trùng Quang came to Bình Than to fight against the Chinese army, but was defeated by general Zhang Fu and fled back to Nghệ An. He was captured in Hoá châu by Chinese army together with his generals around 1413, and was transferred to China. He drowned himself on the way to Yanjing (modern Beijing) in the next year.

Trùng Quang Đế Later Trần dynasty Born: 1390? Died: 1414
Regnal titles
Preceded by Giản Định Đế	Emperor of Đại Việt; 1409–1414	Vacant Title next held by Trần Cảo
Preceded by Giản Định Đế	Emperor of Later Trần Dynasty; 1409–1414	Succeeded by dynasty collapsed
