= Đại Việt =

Vietnamese monarchy (10th–19th century)

Coordinates: 21°02′15″N 105°50′24″E

State of Đại Cồ Việt (968–1054) State of Đại Việt (1054–1400, 1428–1804) State of Đại Ngu (1400–1407) Đại Cồ Việt Quốc (大瞿越國) Đại Việt Quốc (大越國) Đại Ngu Quốc (大虞國)
- 968–1407; 1428–1804
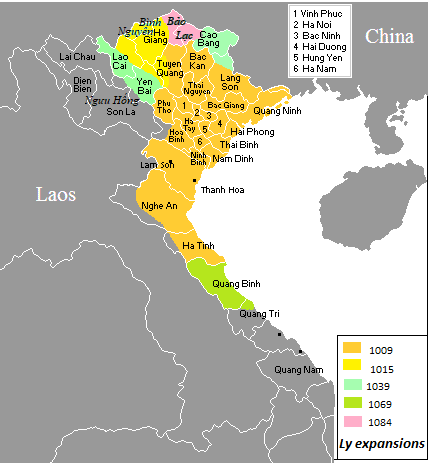
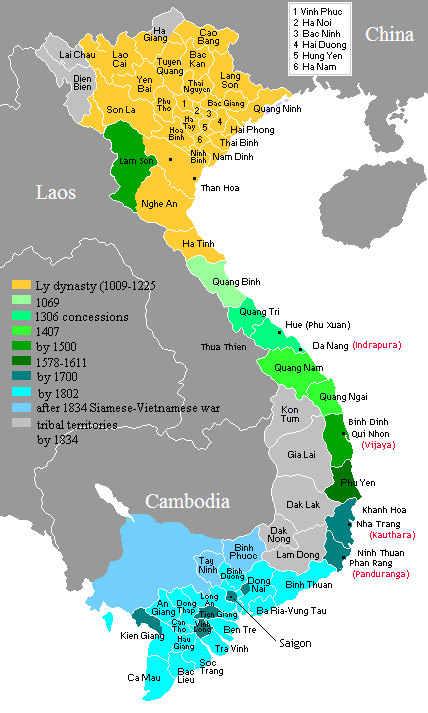
- Capital: Hoa Lư (968–1010) (Thăng Long/ Đông Kinh) (1010–1398, 1428–1789); Tây Đô (1398–1407); Phú Xuân (1789–1804)
- Official languages: Literary Chinese (Note: The use of the Classical Chinese language in documents and correspondences is distinct from the use of the Chữ Nôm writing system for the Vietnamese language.) (968–1400, 1407–1778, 1802–1804); Vietnamese (1400–1407, 1778–1802)
- Common languages: Vietnamese, other Austroasiatic languages, Kra–Dai languages
- Religion: Buddhism; Confucianism; Taoism; Folk religion Hinduism; Islam; Catholicism
- Government: Absolute monarchy (968–1527, 1788–1804) Ceremonial monarchy under hereditary military dictatorship (1533–1788)
- Emperor
  - 968–980: Đinh Bộ Lĩnh (first)
  - 1802–1804: Gia Long (last)
- Regents and viceroys (de facto rulers)
  - 1533–1545 (first): Nguyễn Kim
  - 1545–1786: Trịnh lords
  - 1786–1788 (last): Nguyễn Huệ
- Historical era: Postclassical era to Late modern period
  - End of Third Chinese domination of Vietnam: 905
  - Established: 968
  - Adoption of Đại Việt as state name by Lý Thánh Tông: 1054
  - Adoption of Đại Ngu as state name by Hồ Quý Ly: 1400
  - Ming rule: 1407–1427
  - Northern and Southern dynasties: 1533–1593
  - Trịnh–Nguyễn contention: 1558–1775
  - Tây Sơn rebellion: 1771–1802
  - Adoption of Việt Nam as state name by Gia Long: 1804

Population
  - 1200: 1,200,000
  - 1400: 1,600,000
  - 1539: 5,625,000
- Currency: Vietnamese văn, banknote
Preceded by	Succeeded by
Tĩnh Hải quân	Việt Nam under the Nguyễn dynasty
- Today part of: Vietnam; China; Laos; Cambodia

Đại Việt (大越, IPA: [ɗâjˀ vìət]; literally Great Việt) was the official name of multiple Vietnamese monarchies in eastern Mainland Southeast Asia from the 10th century AD to the early 19th century, centered around the region of present-day Hanoi. The initial name, Đại Cồ Việt, (Note: chữ Hán: 大瞿越) was adopted in 968 by Emperor Đinh Bộ Lĩnh, following his successful campaigns that ended the Anarchy of the 12 Warlords and lasted until the beginning of the reign of Lý Thánh Tông (r. 1054–1072), the third emperor of the Lý dynasty. Đại Việt lasted until the reign of Gia Long (r. 1802–1820), the first emperor of the Nguyễn dynasty, when the name was changed to Việt Nam in 1804. Under rule of bilateral diplomacy with Imperial China, it was known as the Principality of Giao Chỉ (Note: chữ Hán: 交趾) (975–1164) and later the Kingdom of Annam (Note: chữ Hán: 安南) (1164–1804) when Emperor Xiaozong of Song recognized Đại Việt's independence and upgraded its status from principality to kingdom.

Đại Việt's history was divided into the rule of eight dynasties: Đinh (968–980), Early Lê (980–1009), Lý (1009–1226), Trần (1226–1400), Hồ (1400–1407), and Later Lê (1428–1789); the Mạc dynasty (1527–1677); and the short-lived Tây Sơn dynasty (1778–1802). It was briefly interrupted by the Hồ dynasty (1400–1407), which changed the country's name to Đại Ngu, (Note: chữ Hán: 大虞) and the Fourth Era of Northern Domination (1407–1427), when the region was administered as Jiaozhi by the Ming dynasty. Đại Việt's history can also be divided into two periods: the unified state, which lasted from the 960s to 1533, and the fragmented state, from 1533 to 1802, when there were more than one dynasty and several noble clans simultaneously ruling from their own domains. From the 13th to the 18th century, Đại Việt's borders expanded to encompass territory that resembled modern-day Vietnam, which lies along the South China Sea from the Gulf of Tonkin to the Gulf of Thailand.

Early Đại Việt emerged in the 960s as a hereditary monarchy, with Mahayana Buddhism as its state religion, and lasted for six centuries. From the 16th century onwards, it gradually weakened and decentralized into multiple sub-kingdoms and domains, ruled by either the Lê, Mạc, Trịnh, or Nguyễn families simultaneously. It was briefly unified by the Tây Sơn brothers in 1786, who divided it among themselves in 1787. The Lê-Mạc war was followed by the Trịnh-Nguyễn War and the Tây Sơn wars, which ended with a final Nguyễn clan victory and the destruction of the Tây Sơn dynasty. Đại Việt was reunified, ending 262 years of fragmentation with the founding of the Nguyễn dynasty in 1802. From 968 to 1804, Đại Việt flourished and acquired significant power in the region. The state slowly annexed Champa and Cambodia's territories, expanding Vietnamese territories to the south and west. The state of Đại Việt was the primary precursor to the country of Vietnam and the basis for its national historic and cultural identity.

== Etymology ==
=== Việt ===
The term Việt (Yue) (Chinese: 越; pinyin: Yuè; Cantonese Yale: Yuht; Wade–Giles: Yüeh^{4}; Vietnamese: Việt) in Early Middle Chinese was first written using the logograph "戉" for an axe (a homophone) in oracle bone and bronze inscriptions of the late Shang dynasty (c. 1200 BC), and later as "越". At the time, it may have referred to a people or chieftain to the northwest of the Shang, such as the Yuefang. According to Ye Wenxian (1990) and Wan (2013), the ethnonym of the Yuefang in northwestern China is not associated with that of the Baiyue in southeastern China. In the early 8th century BC, a tribe on the middle Yangtze was called the "Yangyue", a term later used for people further south. Between the 7th and 4th centuries BC, Yue/Việt referred to the state of Yue in the lower Yangtze basin and its people.

From the 3rd century BC on, the term was used for the non-Han Chinese populations of south and southwest China and northern Vietnam, with particular ethnic groups called Minyue, Ouyue, Luoyue (Vietnamese: Lạc Việt), etc., collectively referred to as the Baiyue (Chinese: 百越; pinyin: Bǎiyuè; Cantonese Yale: Baak Yuet; Vietnamese: Bách Việt; lit. 'Hundred Yue/Việt'). The term Baiyue (or Bách Việt) first appeared in the book Lüshi Chunqiu, compiled around 239 BC. At first, Yue referred to all peoples of the south that practiced un-Chinese slash-and-burn cultivation and lived in stilt houses, but this definition does not suggest that all Yue were the same and spoke the same language. They were loosely connected or independent tribal societies belonging to a diverse ethnolinguistic complex. As Chinese imperial power expanded southward, Chinese sources generalized the tribes of northern Vietnam at the time as Yue, or the Luoyue and the Ouyue (Lạc Việt and Au Viet). Over time, the term Yue morphed into a geopolitical designation rather than a term for a group of people, and it became more of a historical and political term than one tied to connotations of barbarism. During the period of Chinese rule, many states and rebellions in the former region of Yue (southern China and northern Vietnam) used the name Yue as an old geopolitical name rather than as an ethnonym.

When the word Yue (Middle Chinese: ɦʉɐt̚) was borrowed into the Vietnamese language during the late Tang dynasty (618–907) by the Austroasiatic Viet-Muong-speaking peoples, who were the ancestors of the modern-day Vietnamese Kinh, the exonym was gradually localized and became an endonym of the Vietnamese. That endonym might have manifested in different forms depending on how neighboring peoples interacted with and referred to the Vietnamese back then. For instance, until the modern day, the Cham have been calling the Vietnamese Yuen (Yvan), from the reign of Harivarman IV (1074–1080) to the present. It is evident that Vietnamese elites tried to tie their ethnic identity to the ancient Yue through constructed traditions during the late medieval period. However, all endonyms and exonyms referring to the Vietnamese, such as Viet, Kinh, or Kra-Dai Keeu, are related to political structures or have common origins in ancient Chinese geographical imagination. Most of the time, the Austroasiatic-speaking ancestors of the modern Kinh under one single ruler might have assumed for themselves a similar or identical designation, inherent in the modern Vietnamese first-person pronoun ta ("us, we, I"), to differentiate themselves from other groups. In the older colloquial usage, ta corresponded to "ours" as opposed to "theirs", and during colonial times, they were nước ta ("our country") and tiếng ta ("our language"), in contrast to nước tây ("western countries") and tiếng tây ("western languages").

=== Đại Cồ Việt ===
Đại Cồ Việt was the name chosen by Đinh Bộ Lĩnh for his realm when he declared himself emperor in 966. It is probably derived from the vernacular Cự Việt ("Great Việt") or Kẻ Việt ("Việt Region"), with the Sino-Vietnamese Đại ("great") added as a prefix. The name appeared in the 15th-century text Đại Việt sử ký toàn thư but not the earlier 13th- or 14th-century text Đại Việt sử lược. According to Momoki Shiro, Đại Cồ Việt may have been the result of a mistake in the records or invented while compiling old records.

=== Đại Việt ===
When Lý Nhật Tôn ascended to the throne in 1054, he dropped the vernacular nôm term Cồ from Đại Cồ Việt and shortened it to Đại Việt. The term Đại Việt Quốc ("the Great Viet State") has been found on brick inscriptions from Hoa Lư, the first capital of the polity, dating to the 10th century AD. The name Đại Việt is the more literary version of the name and had been in use since before its formalization in 1054.

== History ==
=== Origins ===
For a thousand years, the area of what is now Northern Vietnam was ruled by a succession of Chinese dynasties as Nanyue, Giao Chỉ (交趾, Jiaozhi), Giao Châu (交州, Jiaozhou), Annan, and Jinghai Circuit.

Ancient northern Vietnam and particularly the Red River Delta were inhabited by various ethnolinguistic groups that constituted modern-day Hmong–Mien, Tibeto–Burman, Kra–Dai, and Austroasiatic-speaking peoples. Early societies had emerged and existed there for a while before the Han conquest in 111 BC, such as the Phùng Nguyên and Dong Son cultures. Both practiced metallurgy and sophisticated bronze-casting techniques. They were together called the Yue and barbarians by the Chinese and collectively understood as non-Chinese. Ancient Chinese texts do not give any distinction to each tribe and do not precisely indicate which languages or tribes they interacted with in northern Vietnam. All peoples living under the administration of the empire were usually referred to as either "people" (ren 人) or "subjects" (min 民). There was absolutely no classification or distinction for "Vietnamese", and it is difficult to identify people accurately as such or to infer modern ethnicity from the ancient. It is highly likely that these intermingled multilinguistic communities might have evolved into the present day without modern ethnic consciousness—until ethnic classification efforts carried out by the colonial government and successive governments of the Republic of Vietnam, Democratic Republic of Vietnam, and Socialist Republic of Vietnam—while retaining their intangible ethnic identity. There was no persistent "ethnic Vietnamese" identity during this period.

Official Vietnamese history textbooks usually assume that the people of northern Vietnam during Chinese rule were Việt/Yue. The Yue were broad groups of non-Chinese peoples of the south, which included many different ethnolinguistic groups who shared certain customs. After the disappearance of the Baiyue and the Lac Viet from Chinese records around the first century AD, new indigenous tribal groups might have emerged in the region under the name Li-Lao. The Li-Lao people were also known for their drum casting tradition. The culture produced Heger Type II drums, while the previous Dong Son culture of the Lac Viet produced Heger Type I drums.

The Li-Lao culture flourished from approximately 200 to 750 AD in present-day southern China and northern Vietnam. These Li tribes were recorded in Chinese sources as Lǐ (俚; "bandits") inhabiting the coastal areas between the Pearl River and Red River. Li political structures were distributed in numerous autonomous settlements/chiefdoms (dong 洞) located in riverine valleys. The Book of Sui notes that Li noblemen who possess a bronze drum in each dong were called dulao (都老), which Churchman argues bears some resemblance and cultural connection to the previous local ruling class of the Red River Delta. The Li tribes were described as ferocious raiding bandits who refused to accept imperial authority, leading to Jiaozhou, the heartland of the Red River Delta, being deemed by the Chinese to be an isolated borderland with difficult and limited administration. Because the Li-Lao people managed to keep themselves away from the Chinese sphere of cultural influence, the landscape of northern Vietnam during Han–Tang period experienced a degree of equilibrium between Sinification and localization. From the sixth to the seventh century, Chinese dynasties attempted to militarily subdue the Li dong, gradually causing the Li-Lao culture to decline.

In terms of complex culture and linguistics, the important effects of ten centuries of Chinese rule over northern Vietnam are arguably still observable. Some native languages of the regions for a long time had employed a Sinitic script and Sinitic-derived writing systems to represent their languages, such as Vietnamese, Tày, and Nùng.

James Chamberlain believes that the traditional Vietic realm was north central Vietnam and northern Laos, not the Red River Delta. Based on his interpretation of Keith Weller Taylor's examination of Chinese texts (Jiu Tangshu, Xin Tangshu, Suishu, Taiping Huanyu Ji, Tongdian), Chamberlain suggests that Việt-Mường peoples began emigrating from central Vietnam (Jiuzhen, Rinan) to the Red River Delta in the seventh century, during the Tang dynasty, possibly due to pressure from the Khmers in the south or the Chinese in the north. Chamberlain speculates that during the rebellion led by Mai Thúc Loan, the son of a salt-producing family in Hoan province (today Hà Tĩnh Province, North-Central Vietnam), which lasted from 722 to 723, a large number of Sinicized lowland Vietic people or the Kinh moved north. The Jiu Tangshu records that Mai Thúc Loan, also known as Mai Huyền Thành, styled himself as "the Black Emperor" (possibly after his swarthy complexion), and that he had 400,000 followers from 23 provinces across Annam and other kingdoms, including Champa and Chenla.

However, archaeogenetics demonstrate that before the Đông Sơn period, the Red River Delta's inhabitants were predominantly Austroasiatic: genetic data from Phùng Nguyên culture's Mán Bạc burial site (dated 1800 BC) have close proximity to modern Austroasiatic speakers; meanwhile, "mixed genetics" from Đông Sơn culture's Núi Nấp site show affinity to "Dai from China, Tai-Kadai speakers from Thailand, and Austroasiatic speakers from Vietnam, including the Kinh"; therefore, "[t]he likely spread of Vietic was southward from the RRD, not northward. Accounting for southern diversity will require alternative explanations." Churchman states that "the absence of records of large-scale population shifts indicates that there was a fairly stable group of people in Jiaozhi throughout the Han–Tang period who spoke Austroasiatic languages ancestral to modern Vietnamese". On a Buddhist inscription dated to the 8th century from Thanh Mai village, Hanoi, 100 out of 136 women mentioned in the epigraphy could be identified as ethnic Vietnamese females. Linguist John Phan proposes that a local dialect of Middle Chinese, called Annamese Middle Chinese, developed and was spoken in the Red River Delta by descendants of Chinese immigrants, and later was absorbed into the co-existing Việt-Mường languages by the ninth century. Phan identifies three layers of Chinese loanwords into Vietnamese: the earliest layer dates to the Han dynasty (ca. 1st century CE) and Jin dynasty (ca. 4th century CE); the late layer dates to the post-Tang period; and the recent layer dates to the Ming and Qing dynasties.

==== National historiography ====
Study of northern Vietnam and the Red River Delta during the first millennium AD is problematic. This region is widely associated with the foundation of the modern country and nation-state of Vietnam. It has been given exceptional treatment and academic scrutiny compared to other regions. This unique academic focus has resulted in critical misinterpretations. Some notable academic works have echoed the established frameworks of colonial and postcolonial Vietnamese nationalist historiography in order to associate the entire history of the early Red River Delta with the Vietnamese, i.e., the Kinh, and the modern country of Vietnam. The rewriting of Vietnamese history in the 20th century considered pushing several nationalistic-themed theories. One notable theory, the "continuity", is defined as a belief that the peoples of the Red River Delta during the Han–Tang period had always retained their unique "Vietnamese identity" and "Vietnamese spirit", which was arguably rooted in the highly sophisticated Van Lang kingdoms under the Hung kings, which were largely legends transformed into "historical facts" under the scholarship of the Democratic Republic of Vietnam. This was despite relentless Chinese acculturation, making them "different" from other groups in southern China who "eventually lost their separate identities through assimilation into Chinese culture". The continuity theory reconstructed the emergence of the Đại Việt kingdom in the 10th century as the awakening and resurrection of "Vietnamese sovereignty", and these traditions of Vietnamese exceptionalism continued into modern Vietnam. For example, Keith Taylor took up some aspects of Vietnamese nationalist historiography in his 1983 monograph, The Birth of Vietnam, and falsely asserted that "Vietnam's independence resulted from a thousand-year struggle to throw off Chinese rule by a group of people who held a conviction 'that they were not and did not want to become Chinese.'" Later, Taylor retreated from Vietnamese nationalist historiography.

No evidence of "ethnic Vietnamese" resembling what would be considered the modern Vietnamese exists during the Han–Tang period. Instead, ancient northern Vietnam was very diverse and complex in terms of ethnolinguistic and cultural origins (as it still is today). The continuity theory can be easily discredited by linguistic examinations. By the 9th–11th centuries, the northern portion of the Viet-Muong portion of Vietic speakers had supposedly diverged, and one dialect cluster thereby evolved into Vietnamese. Other theories advocated by John Phan present evidence of the Vietnamese language being developed from a creolized language that resulted from a local linguistic shift from Middle Chinese to proto-Vietnamese after Sinitic rule.

Beside anachronisms, Vietnamese nationalist scholarship also inserted a "Vietnamese resistance" myth into history by labeling any rebellious local group in northern Vietnam during the Han–Tang period as collectively "Vietnamese" who 'were in constant struggles against the Chinese yokes', in contrast to "corrupt invading Chinese colonizers", generic modern nationalities and ethnicities. The context was heavily entangled with modern perceptions about Vietnam during decolonization and the Cold War. Historians such as Catherine Churchman have criticized attempts to characterize the past through the lens of modern national boundaries and project a "wish for the restoration of long-lost national independence" onto localized dynasties.

=== Founding ===
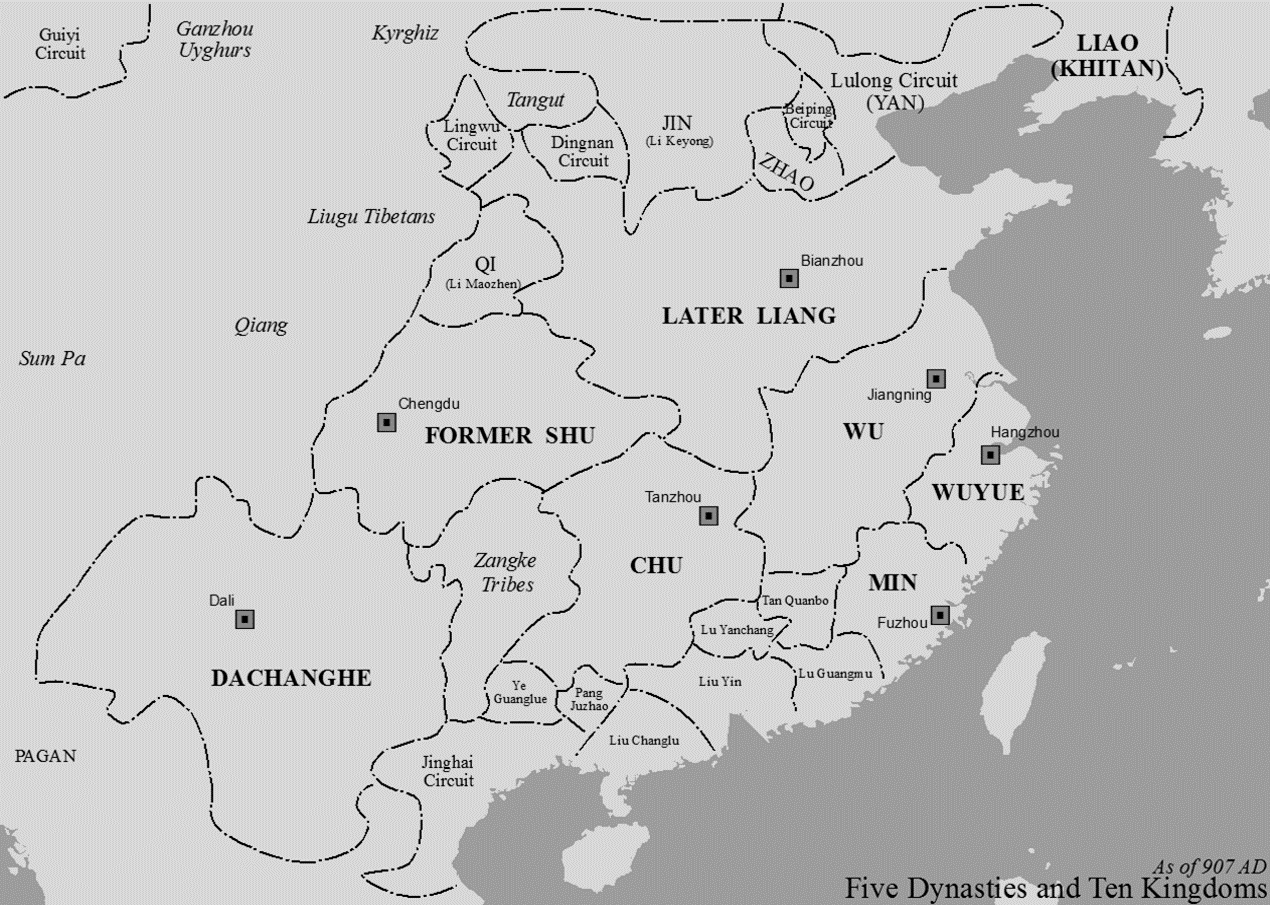
The Tĩnh Hải quân (Jinghai Circuit) of the Khuc clan in 907 at the bottom of the map

Prior to independence in the late 9th century, the area that became Đại Việt in northern Vietnam was ruled by the Tang dynasty as Annan. The hill dwellers on the western frontier of Annan and powerful chieftains such as Lý Do Độc allied with the state of Nanzhao in Yunnan and rebelled against the Tang dynasty in the 860s. They captured Annan in three years, forcing the lowlanders to scatter to throughout the delta. The Tang dynasty turned back and defeated the Nanzhao–indigenous alliance in 866 and renamed the area Jinghai Circuit. A military mutiny forced Tang authorities to withdraw in 880, while loyalist troops left for home on their own initiative.

A regional regime led by the Khúc family formed on the Red River Delta in the early 10th century. From 907 to 917, Khúc Hạo and then Khúc Thừa Mỹ were appointed by Chinese dynasties as jiedushi (tributary governors). The Khúc did not try to create any kind of a de jure independent polity. In 930, the neighboring Southern Han state invaded Annam and removed the Khúc from power. In 931, Dương Đình Nghệ, a local chief from Aizhou, revolted and quickly ousted the Southern Han. In 937, he was assassinated by Kiều Công Tiễn, leader of the revanchist faction allied with the Southern Han. In 938, emperor Liu Gong of the Southern Han led an invasion fleet to Annam to assist Kiều Công Tiễn. Dương Đình Nghệ's son-in-law Ngô Quyền, also from the south, marched north and killed Kiều Công Tiễn. He then led the people to fight and destroyed the Southern Han fleet on the Bạch Đằng River.

After defeating the Southern Han invasion, Ngô Quyền proclaimed himself king over the principality in 939 and established a new dynasty centered in the old Âu Việt's fortress of Cổ Loa. Cổ Loa's sphere of influence probably did not reach the other local nobility. In 944, after his death, Ngô Quyền's brother-in-law Dương Tam Kha (son of Dương Đình Nghệ) took power. The Dương clan increased factional segregation by bringing more southern men into the court. As a result, the principality broke apart during the reign of Tam Kha. Ngô Quyền's sons Ngô Xương Văn and Ngô Xương Ngập deposed their maternal uncle and became dual kings in 950. In 954, Ngô Xương Ngập died. The younger Ngô Xương Văn ruled as the sole king and was killed by warlords nine years later, which led to chaos across the Red River Delta.

=== Đại Cồ Việt (968–1054) ===
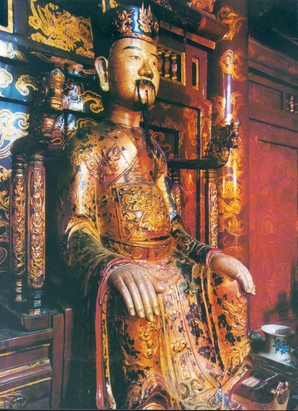
Sculpture of Đinh Bộ Lĩnh in Hoa Lư temple (c. 17th century)

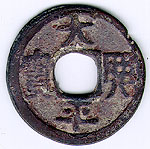
Thái Bình Hưng Bảo coin (~970s)

The death of King Ngô Quyền brought a period of chaos and civil war from 965 to 968, and the country was divided between a dozen rebellious warlords with their own factions. A new leader emerged, named Đinh Bộ Lĩnh, from Hoa Lư. He and his son Đinh Liễn spent two years in political and military struggle. In 968, after defeating all twelve warlords, he unified the country. On his ascension, he renamed the country Đại Cồ Việt ("The Great Gau(tama)'s Việt") and moved his court to Hoa Lư. He became king of Đại Cồ Việt (r. 968–979) and titled himself emperor, while Đinh Liễn became the great prince. In 973 and 975, Đinh Bộ Lĩnh sent two embassies to the Song dynasty and established relationships. Buddhist clergy were put in charge of important positions. Coins were minted. The territories of the early Việt state comprised the lowland Red River basin to the Nghệ An region. According to a Hoa Lư inscription from c. 979, that year, Đinh Liễn murdered his brother Đinh Hạng Lang, who had been promoted to crown prince by his father. In late 979, both Đinh Bộ Lĩnh and Đinh Liễn were assassinated. Hearing the news, Ngô Nhật Khánh—a prince of the old royal family in exile—and king Paramesvaravarman I of Champa launched a naval attack on Hoa Lư, but much of the fleet was capsized by a late-season typhoon.

Queen Dương Vân Nga appointed her partner, general Lê Hoàn, chief of the state. Lê Hoàn's rivals then attacked him but were defeated. The queen of the Dương family decided to replace the Đinh with the Lê family of Lê Hoàn and brought the crown from her six-year-old son Đinh Toàn (r. 979–980) to Lê Hoàn (r. 980–1005) in 980. Disturbances in Đại Cồ Việt attracted attention from the Song dynasty. In 981, the Song emperor launched an invasion but was repulsed by Lê Hoàn. In 982, he attacked Champa, killed the Cham king Paramesvaravarman I, and destroyed a Cham city. A Khmer inscription (c. 987) mentioned that in that year, some Vietnamese merchants or envoys arrived in Cambodia through the Mekong.

After Lê Hoàn died in 1005, civil war broke out between crown princes Lê Long Việt, Lê Long Đĩnh, Lê Long Tích, and Lê Long Kính. Long Việt (r. 1005) was murdered by Long Đĩnh after ruling for only three days. As the Lê brothers fought each other, the Lý family—a member of the court's cadet, led by Lý Công Uẩn—quickly rose to power. Long Đĩnh (r. 1005–1009) ruled as a tyrant king and developed hemorrhoids, dying in November 1009. Lý Công Uẩn ascended the throne two days later, with support from the monkhood, as Lý Thái Tổ.

=== Flourishing period: Đại Việt under the Lý and Trần (1054–1400) ===
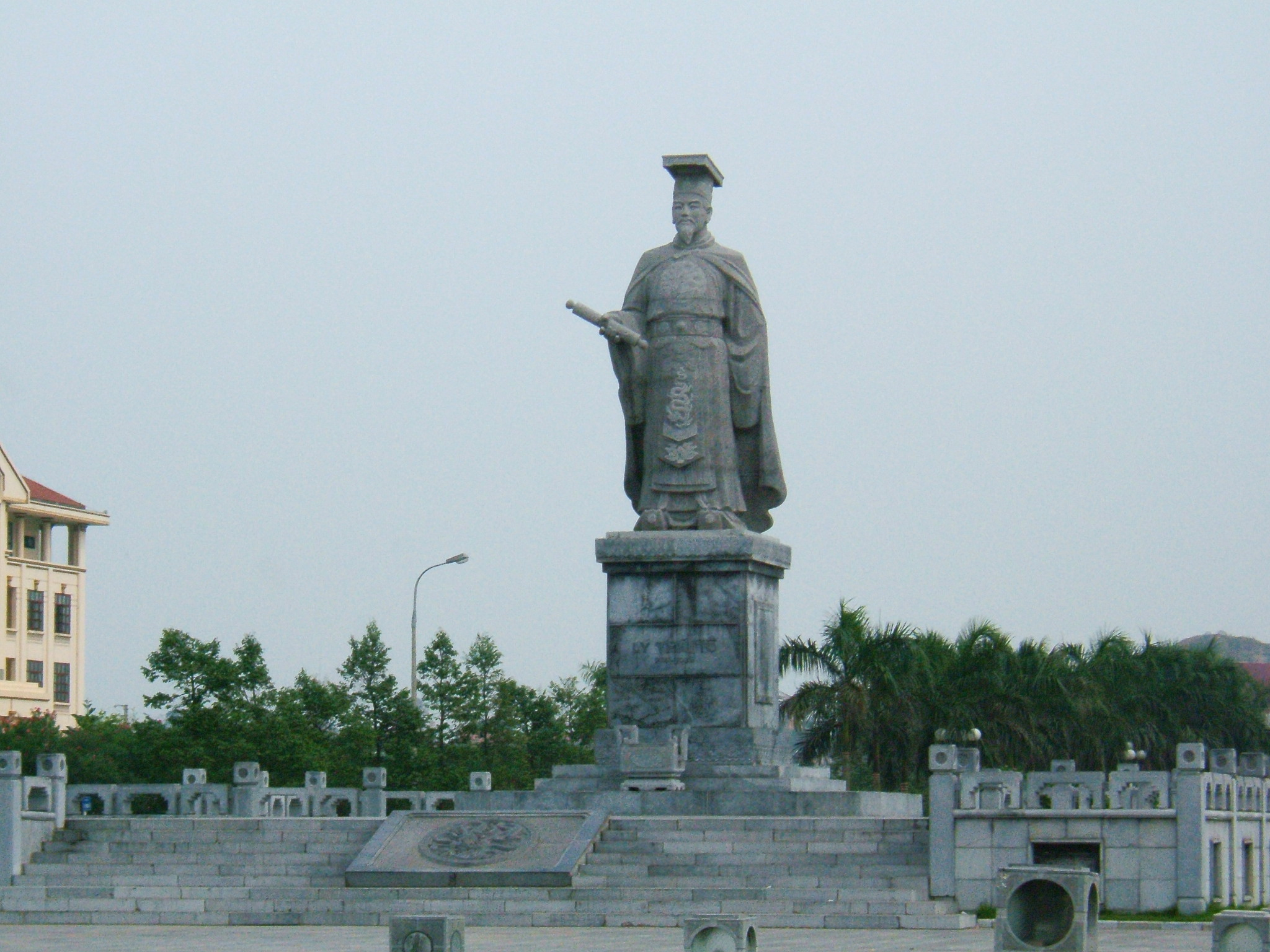
Statue of Ly Cong Uan (974–1028) in Bac Ninh

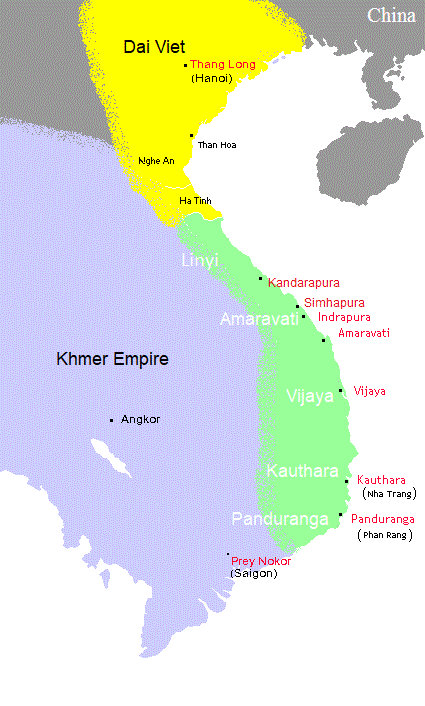
Map of Đại Việt (yellow) in the 11th century

==== Lý dynasty ====
Emperor Lý Thái Tổ (r. 1009–1028) moved his court to the abandoned city of Đại La, which had previously been a seat of power under the Tang dynasty, and renamed it to Thăng Long in 1010. The city became what is now Hanoi. To control and maintain the nation's wealth, in 1013, Lý created a taxation system. His reign was relatively peaceful, though he campaigned against the Han communities in Hà Giang massif and subdued them in 1014. He furthermore laid the basis of a stable Vietnamese state, and his dynasty would rule the kingdom for the next 200 years.

Lý's son Lý Thái Tông (r. 1028–1053) and grandson Lý Thánh Tông (r. 1054–1071) continued to strengthen the Việt state. Starting during the reign of Lê Hoàn, the Việt expansion extended territories from the Red River Delta in all directions. The Vietnamese destroyed the Cham northern capital of Inprapura in 982; raided and plundered southern Chinese port cities in 995, 1028, 1036, 1059, and 1060; subdued the Nùng people in 1039; raided Laos in 1045; invaded Champa and pillaged Cham cities in 1044 and 1069; and subjugated the three northern Cham provinces of Địa Lý, Ma Linh, and Bố Chính. Contact between the Song dynasty of China and the Việt state increased through raids and tributary missions, which resulted in Chinese cultural influences on Vietnamese culture: the first civil examination based on the Chinese model was staged in 1075, the Chinese script was declared official at the court in 1174, and the emergence of the Vietnamese demotic script (Chữ Nôm) occurred in the 12th century.

In 1054, Lý Thánh Tông changed his kingdom's name to Đại Việt and declared himself emperor. He married an ordinary girl named Lady Ỷ Lan, and she gave birth to the crown prince Lý Càn Đức. In 1072, the infant became emperor Lý Nhân Tông (r. 1072–1127), the longest-ruling monarch in Vietnamese history. During the early years of Lý Nhân Tông, his father's military leader Lý Thường Kiệt, uncle Lý Đạo Thành, and Queen Ỷ Lan became court regents. From the 1070s, border tensions between the Song Empire, local Tai principalities, and the Việt kingdom broke out into open violence. In late 1075, Lý Thường Kiệt led a naval invasion of southern China. Việt troops wreaked havoc on Chinese border towns, then laid siege to Nanning and captured it one month later. The Song emperor sent a large counter-invasion of Đại Việt in late 1076, but Lý Thường Kiệt was able to fend it off and defeat the Chinese at the Battle of the Cầu River, where half of the Song forces died from combat and disease. Lý Nhân Tông then offered peace with the Song, and all hostilities ended in 1084; the Song subsequently recognized the Việt polity as a sovereign kingdom. According to a 14th-century chronicle, the Đại Việt sử lược, the Khmer Empire sent three embassies to Đại Việt in 1086, 1088, and 1095. The matured Lý Nhân Tông came to rule in 1085. He defeated the Cham ruler Jaya Indravarman II in 1103, built the Dạm Pagoda in Bắc Ninh in 1086, and constructed a Buddhist temple for his mother called Long Đọi pagoda in 1121. He died in 1127. One of his nephews, Lý Dương Hoán, succeeded him and became known as emperor Lý Thần Tông (r. 1128–1138). This marked the downfall of Lý family authority within the court.

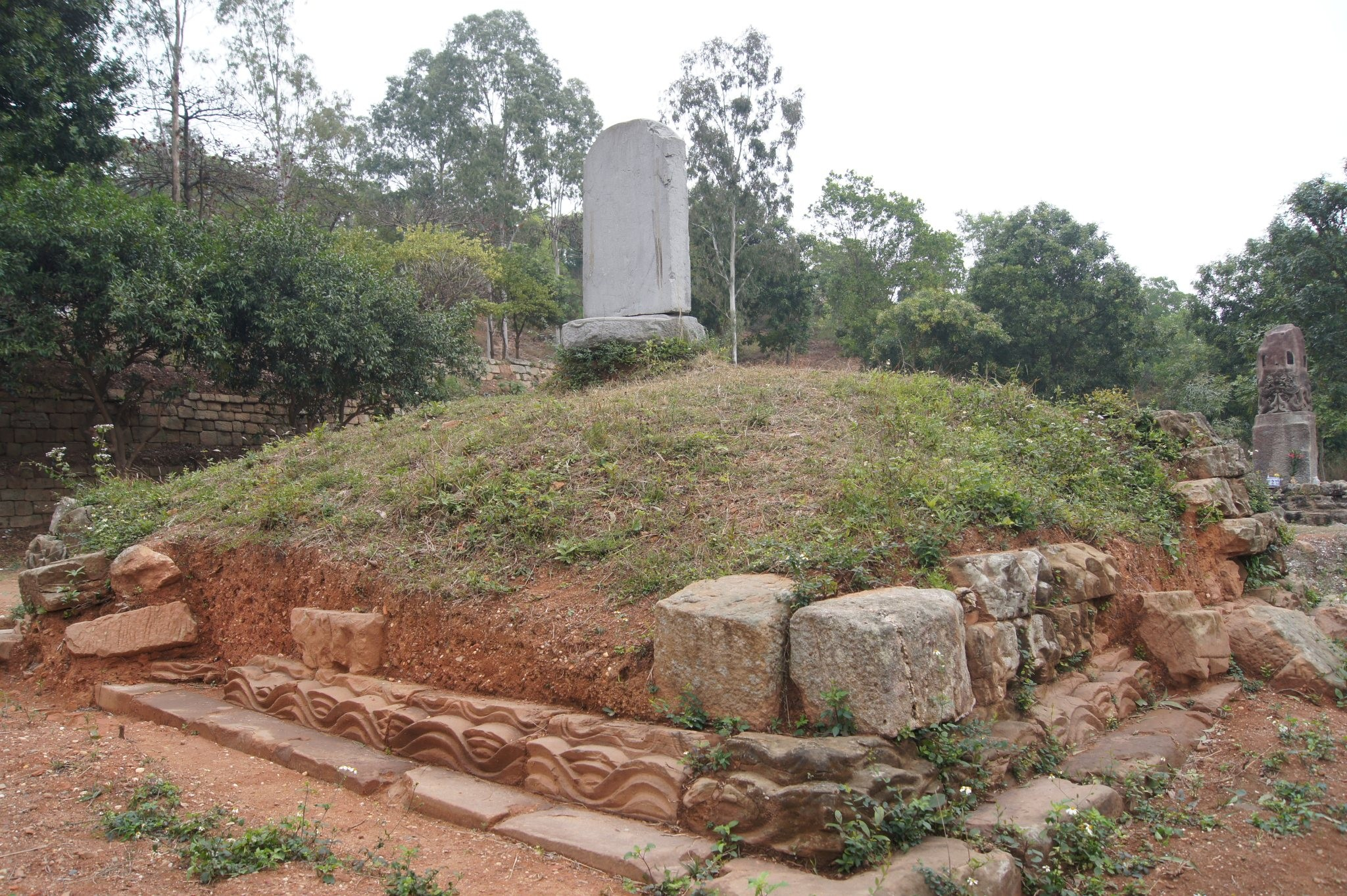
Remnants of Dạm Pagoda (built in emperor Lý Nhân Tông's era, early 12th century)

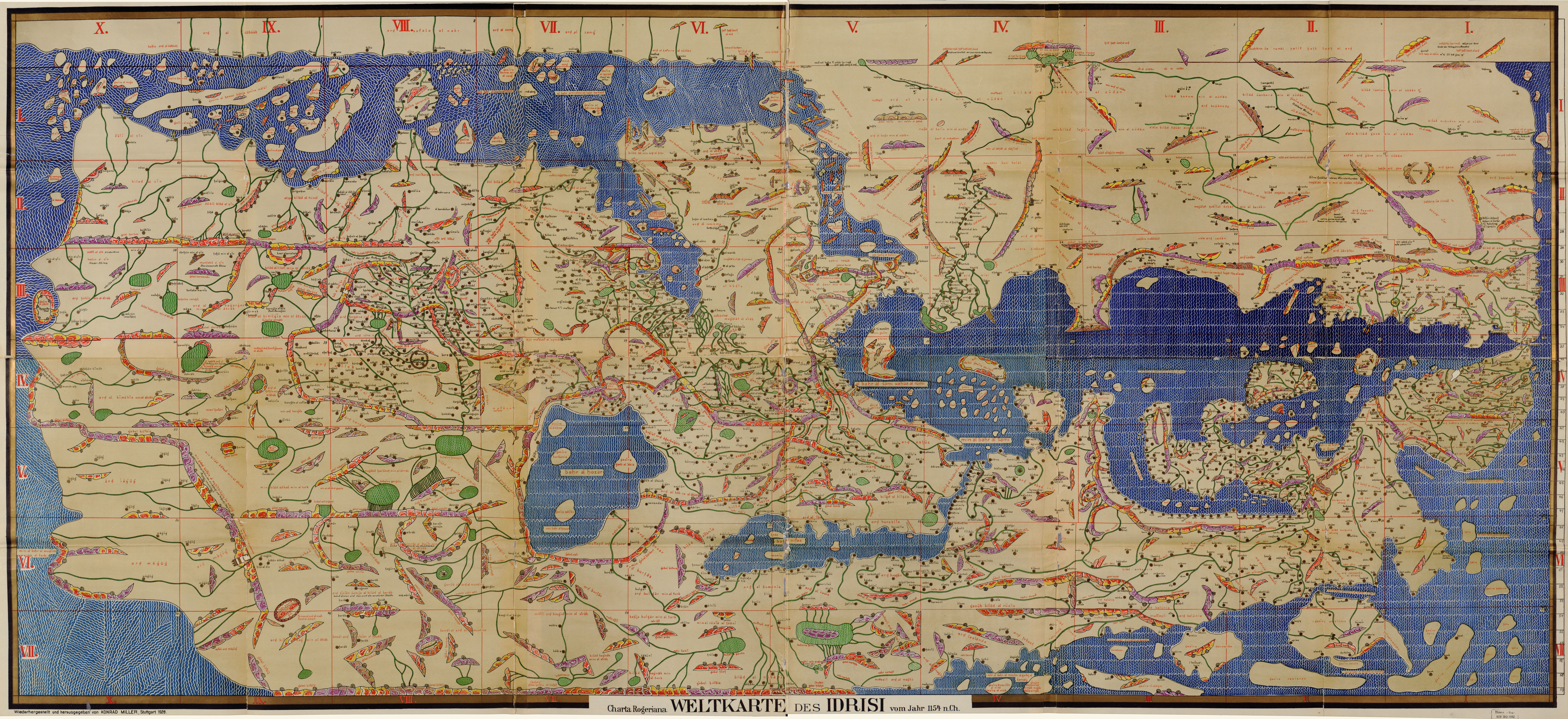
Luqīn (Annam/Đại Việt) and Sanf (Champa) are shown in the bottom right of the Tabula Rogeriana, drawn by al-Idrisi for Roger II of Sicily in 1154.

Lý Thần Tông was crowned under the supervision of Lê Bá Ngọc, a powerful eunuch. Lê Bá Ngọc adopted a son of the emperor's mother, named Đỗ Anh Vũ. During the reign of Lý Thần Tông, Suryavarman II of the Khmer Empire launched an attack on Đại Việt's southern territories in 1128. In 1132, he allied with the Cham king Jaya Indravarman III and briefly seized Nghệ An and pillaged Thanh Hoá. In 1135, Duke Đỗ Anh Vũ raised an army and repelled the Khmer invaders. After the Chams refused to support them in 1137, Suryavarman II abandoned his incursions on Đại Việt and launched an invasion of Champa. At the same time, Lý Thần Tông began suffering from a fatal illness, and he died the next year, leaving the infant Lý Thiên Tộ to become emperor Lý Anh Tông (r. 1138–1175) under Đỗ Anh Vũ's patronage. After Đõ Anh Vũ died in 1159, another powerful figure, named Tô Hiến Thành, stepped into the role of guarding the dynasty, until 1179. In 1149, Javanese and Siamese ships arrived in Vân Đồn to trade. The sixth son of Lý Anh Tông, prince Lý Long Trát, was crowned in 1175 as Lý Cao Tông (r. 1175–1210).

By the 1190s, more outsider clans were able to penetrate and infiltrate the royal family, further weakening Lý authority. Three powerful aristocratic families—Đoàn, Nguyễn, and Trần (descendants of Trần emperors, a Chinese emigre from Fujian)—emerged at the court and contested it on behalf of the royals. In 1210, Lý Cao Tông's eldest son, Lý Sảm, became emperor Lý Huệ Tông of Đại Việt (r. 1210–1224). In 1224, Lý Sảm appointed his second princess, Lý Phật Kim, (empress Lý Chiêu Hoàng) as his successor while he abdicated and became a monk. Finally, in 1225, the Trần leader Trần Thủ Độ sponsored a marriage between his eight-year-old nephew Trần Cảnh and Lý Chiêu Hoàng, meaning the Lý would give up power to the Trần, and Trần Cảnh became emperor Trần Thái Tông of the new dynasty of Đại Việt.

==== Rise of Trần dynasty and Mongol invasions ====
During his reign, the young Trần Thái Tông centralized the monarchy, organized the civil examination on the Chinese model, built the Royal Academy and Confucian Temple, and ordered the construction and repair of delta dikes. In 1257, the Mongol Empire under Möngke Khan, who was waging a war to conquer the Song Empire, sent envoys to Trần Thái Tông and demanded the emperor of Đại Việt to present himself to the Mongol khan in Peking. When the demand was rejected and the envoys were imprisoned, about 25,000 Mongol–Dali troops, led by general Uriyangqadaï, invaded Đại Việt from Yunnan and then attacked the Song Empire from Đại Việt. Unprepared, Trần Thái Tông's army was overwhelmed at the battle of Bình Lệ Nguyên on 17 January 1258. Five days later, the Mongols captured and sacked Thăng Long. The Mongols retreated to Yunnan fourteen days later, as Trần Thái Tông had submitted and sent tribute to Möngke.

Trần Thái Tông's successors Trần Thánh Tông (r. 1258–1278) and Trần Nhân Tông (r. 1278–1293) continued to send tribute to the new Mongol-led Yuan dynasty. In 1283, Yuan emperor Kublai Khan launched an invasion of Champa. In early 1285, he commissioned prince Toghon to lead the second invasion of Đại Việt to punish the Vietnamese emperor Trần Nhân Tông for not helping the Yuan campaign in Champa and refusing to send tribute. Kublai also appointed Trần Ích Tắc, a Trần prince, as the puppet emperor of Đại Việt. Though Yuan forces initially captured Thăng Long, they were ultimately defeated by the Cham–Vietnamese alliance in June. In 1288, they decided to launch the third and largest invasion of Đại Việt but were repelled. Prince Trần Hưng Đạo ended the Mongol yoke through a decisive naval victory in the battle of Bạch Đằng River in April 1288. Đại Việt continued to flourish under the reigns of Trẩn Nhân Tông and Trần Anh Tông (r. 1293–1314).

==== Crisis and Champa invasions ====
By the 14th century, the Đại Việt kingdom began experiencing a long decline. The population is estimated to have grown from 1.2 million in 1200 to perhaps 2.4 million in 1340. The transitional decade (1326–36) from the end of the Medieval Warm Period to the Little Ice Age severely affected the climate of the Red River Delta. Weather phenomena such as drought, violent flooding, and storms frequently occurred, which weakened irrigation systems, damaged agricultural production, generated famines, and impoverished the peasantry, which together with widespread non-bubonic plagues unleashed robbery and chaos.

Trần Anh Tông seized northern Champa in 1307, intervening in its politics through the marriage of Cham king Jaya Simhavarman III with Trần Anh Tông's sister, queen Paramecvariin. Trần Minh Tông (r. 1314–1329) entered conflict with the Tai people in Laos and Sukhothai from the 1320s to the 1330s. During the reign of the weak king Trần Dụ Tông (r. 1341–1369), internal rebellions led by serfs and peasants from the 1340s and 1360s weakened royal power. In 1369, due to Trần Dụ Tông's lack of an heir, power was seized by Dương Nhật Lễ, a man from the Dương clan. A short bloody civil war led by the royal Tran family against the Dương clan broke out in 1369–1370, creating turmoil. The Trần enthroned Trần Nghệ Tông (r. 1370–1372), while Dương Nhật Lễ was deposed and executed.

Dương's queen mother went into exile in Champa and begged the Cham king Po Binasuor (Chế Bồng Nga) to help her get revenge. In response, the Champa empire under Po Binasuor invaded Đại Việt and ransacked Thăng Long in 1371. Six years later, the Đại Việt army suffered a great defeat at Battle of Vijaya, and Trần Duệ Tông (r. 1373–1377) was killed. The Chams then continued to advance north, besieging, pillaging, and looting Thăng Long four times from 1378 to 1383. War with Champa ended in 1390 after Po Binasuor was killed during his northward offensive by Vietnamese forces led by prince Trần Khát Chân, who used firearms in battle.

=== Hồ dynasty (1400–1407) ===
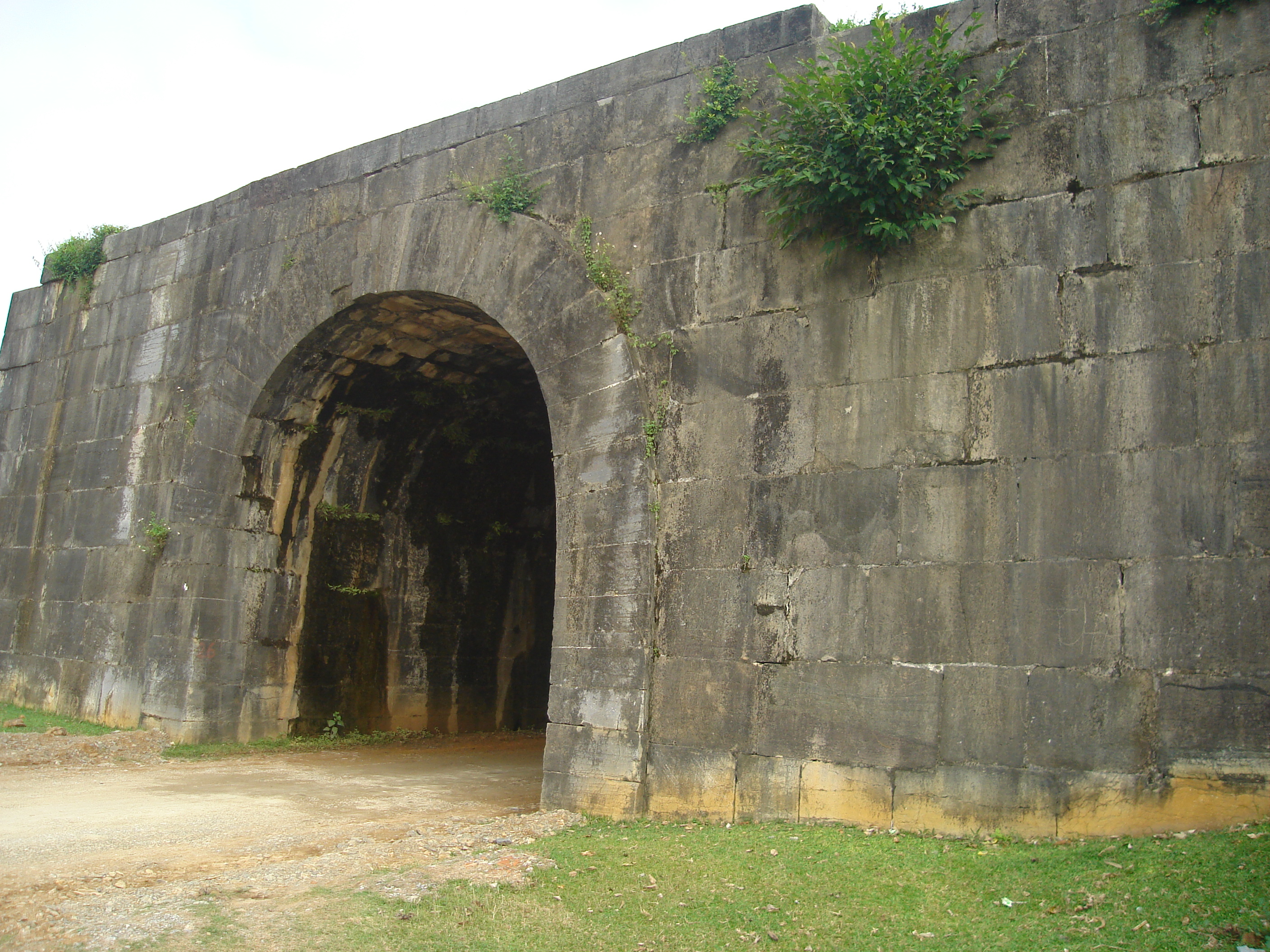
Tây Đô citadel, built by Hồ Quý Ly (c. 1397)

Hồ Quý Ly (1336–1407), the minister of the Trần court who had desperately fought off the Cham invasions, now became the most powerful figure in the kingdom. He conducted a series of reforms, including replacing copper coins with banknotes, despite the kingdom still recovering from the devastating war. Over time, he slowly eliminated the Trần dynasty and aristocracy. In 1400, he deposed the last Trần emperor and became ruler of Đại Việt. Hồ Quý Ly became emperor, moved the capital to Tây Đô, and briefly changed the kingdom's name to Đại Ngu ("great joy/peace") (大虞). In 1401, he stepped down and established as king his second son, Hồ Hán Thương (r. 1401–1407), who had Trần ancestry.

=== Ming invasion and occupation (1407–1427) ===
In 1406, emperor Yongle of the Ming dynasty, in the name of restoring the Trần dynasty, invaded Đại Ngu. The ill-prepared Vietnamese resistance of Hồ Quý Ly, who failed to get support from his people, especially from the Thăng Long literati, was defeated by a Chinese army of 215,000, armed with the newest technology at the time. Đại Ngu became the thirteenth province of the Ming empire. A line of the Trần dynasty, the Later Trần, continued to rule the southern part of Đại Việt and led Vietnamese rebellions against the Ming empire, until being subdued in 1413.

The short-lived Ming colonial rule had traumatic impacts on the kingdom and the Vietnamese. In pursuit of their sinicization, the Ming opened Confucian schools and shrines, prohibited old Vietnamese traditions such as tattooing, and sent several thousand Vietnamese scholars to China, where they were re-educated in Neo-Confucian classics. Some of these literati would dramatically change the Vietnamese state under the new Lê dynasty when they returned in the 1430s and served the new court, triggering a major shift from Mahayana Buddhism to Confucianism. The remnants of pre-1400s Buddhist sanctuaries and temples in Hanoi were systematically demolished and removed.

=== Initial Lê dynasty (1428–1527) ===
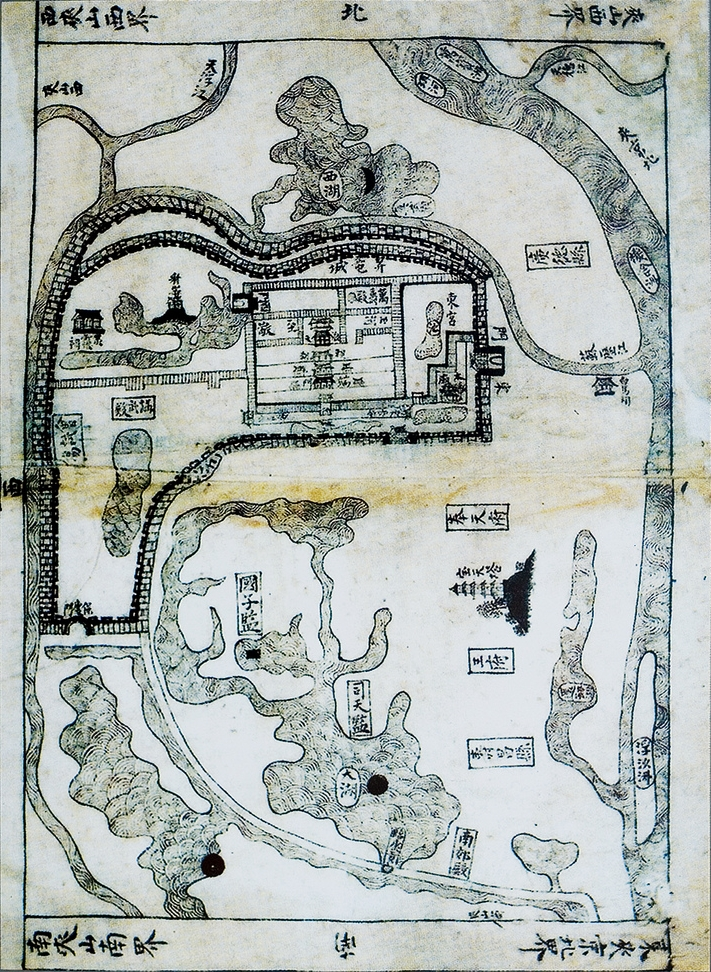
Map of Đông Kinh (Hanoi) drawn during the Later Lê Dynasty

==== Lam Sơn uprising ====
Lê Lợi, the son of a peasant from the Thanh Hoá region, led an uprising against the Chinese occupation starting in February 1418, waging a war of independence against Ming colonial rule that lasted nine years. Assisted by Nguyễn Trãi, a prominent anti-Ming scholar, and other Thanh Hoá families—the Trịnh and the Nguyễn—his rebel forces managed to capture and defeat several major Ming strongholds and counterattacks, and they eventually drove the Chinese back to the north in 1427. In April 1428, Lê Lợi was proclaimed emperor of a new Đại Việt. He established Hanoi as Đông Kinh, or the eastern capital, while the dynasty's estate, Lam Son, became Tây Kinh, or the western capital.

Through his proclamation, Lê Lợi called upon educated men of ability to come forward to serve the new monarchy. The old Buddhist aristocrats were stripped during the Ming occupation and gave rise to the new emerging literati class. For the first time, a centralized authority based on proper laws was instituted. Literary examination now became crucial for the Việt state, and scholars like Nguyễn Trãi played a large role in the court.

Lê Lợi shifted his main focus to the Tai people and the Laotian Lan Xang kingdom in the west, due to their betrayal and subsequent alliance with the Ming during his rebellion in the 1420s. In 1431 and 1433, the Việt launched several campaigns on various Tai polities, subdued them, and incorporated the northwest region into Đại Việt.

==== Rule of Lê Lợi ====
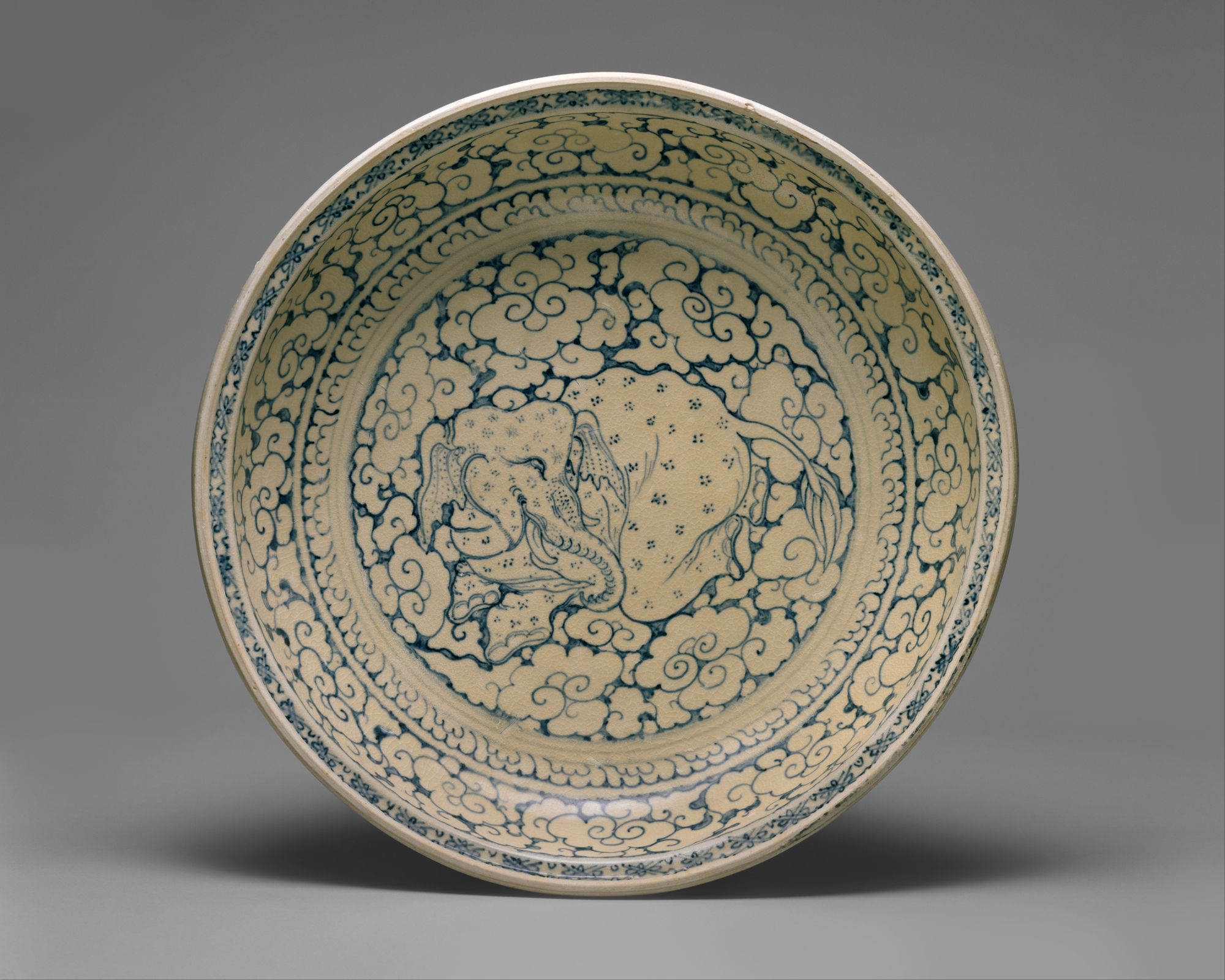
Blue-line white dish decorates elephant surrounded by clouds, 15th century; Metropolitan Museum of Art.

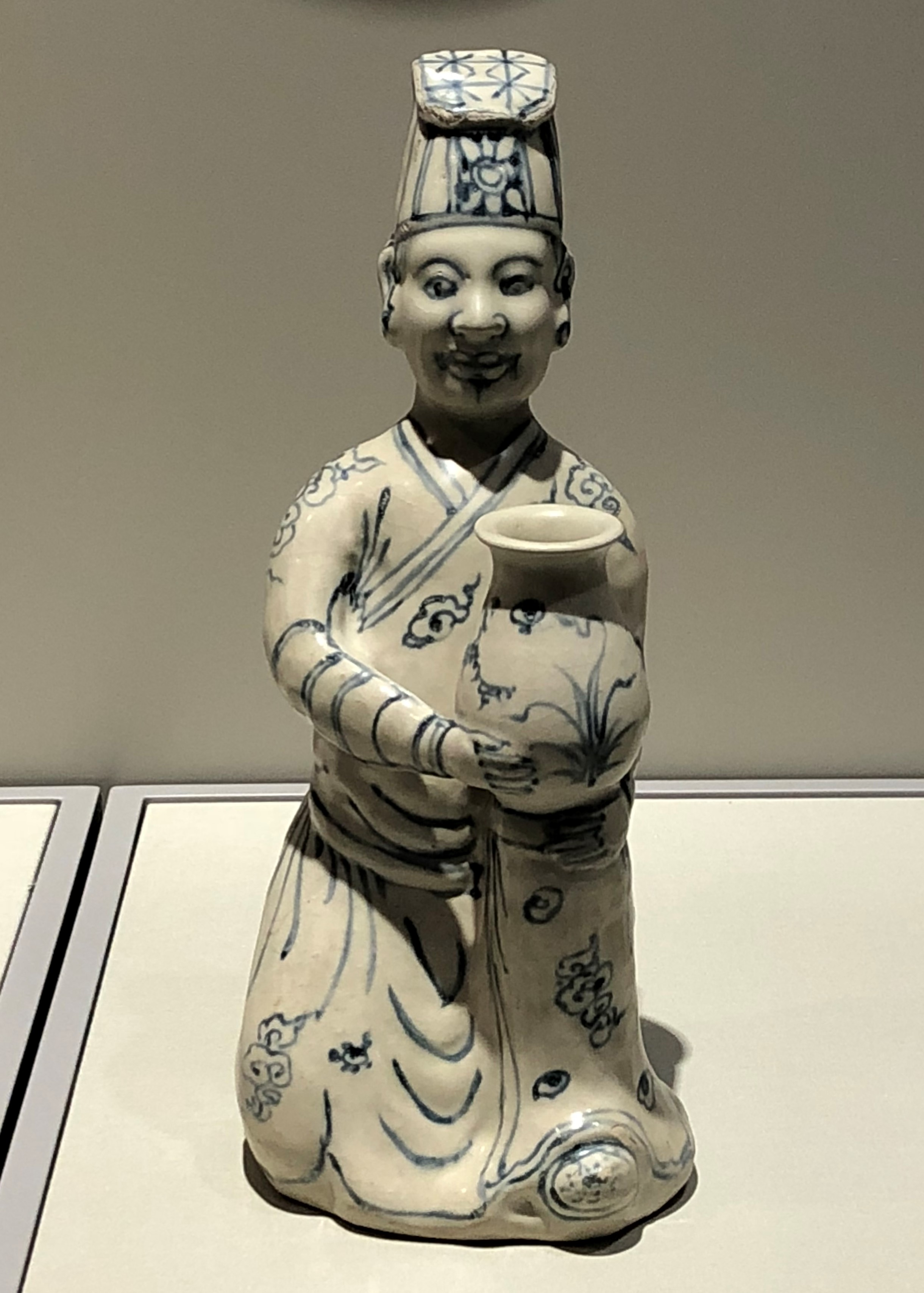
Kneeling royal scribe, 15th century; Asian Civilisations Museum.

Lê Lợi died in 1433. He chose the younger prince Lê Nguyên Long (Lê Thái Tông, r. 1433–1442) as his heir instead of the eldest, Lê Tư Tề. Later, Lê Tư Tề was expelled from the royal family and his status was degraded to that of a commoner. Lê Thái Tông was only ten years old when he was crowned in 1433. Lê Lợi's former comrades now fought politically with each other to control the court. Lê Sát used his power as the young emperor's regent to purge opposition factions. When Lê Thái Tông found out about Le Sat's abuses of power, he allied with Lê Sát's rival, Trịnh Khả. In 1437, Lê Sát was arrested and given a death sentence.

In 1439, Lê Thái Tông launched a campaign against rebelling Tai vassals in the west and Chinese settlers in Đại Việt. He ordered the Chinese to cut their hair short and wear clothes of the Kinh people. One of his sisters raised in China was forced to commit suicide, being accused of multiple conspiracies. Later, he had four princes: the eldest son Lê Nghi Dân, the second Lê Khắc Xương, the third Lê Bang Cơ, and the youngest Lê Hạo. In 1442, Lê Thái Tông died under suspicious circumstances after a visit to Nguyễn Trãi's family; Nguyễn Trãi and his clan of relatives were innocently condemned to death.

One-year-old Lê Bang Cơ (Lê Nhân Tông, r. 1442–1459) assumed the throne a few days after his father's death. The emperor was too young, and most political power fell Lê Lợi's former comrades Trịnh Khả and Lê Thụ, who allied with the queen mother Nguyễn Thị Anh. During the dry season of 1445–1446, Trịnh Khả, Lê Thụ, and Trịnh Khắc Phục attacked Champa and took Vijaya, where the king of Champa Maha Vijaya (r. 1441–1446) was captured. Trịnh Khả installed Maha Kali (r. 1446–1449) as a puppet king. However, three years later, Kali's elder brother murdered him and became king. Relations between the two kingdoms degraded into hostility. In 1451, amidst chaotic political struggles, queen Nguyễn Thị Anh ordered Trịnh Khả to be executed on charges of conspiracy against the royal throne. Only two of Lê Lợi's former comrades, Nguyễn Xí and Đinh Liệt, remained alive.

During a night in late 1459, prince Lê Nghi Dân and his followers stormed the palace, stabbing his half-brother and the queen mother. Four days later, he was proclaimed emperor. Nghi Dân ruled the kingdom for eight months, before the two former-Nguyễn Xí and Đinh Liệt carried out a coup against him. Two days after Nghi Dân's death, the youngest prince Lê Hạo was crowned and named Emperor Lê Thánh Tông the Overflowing Virtue (r. 1460–1479).

==== Lê Thánh Tông's reforms and expansions ====
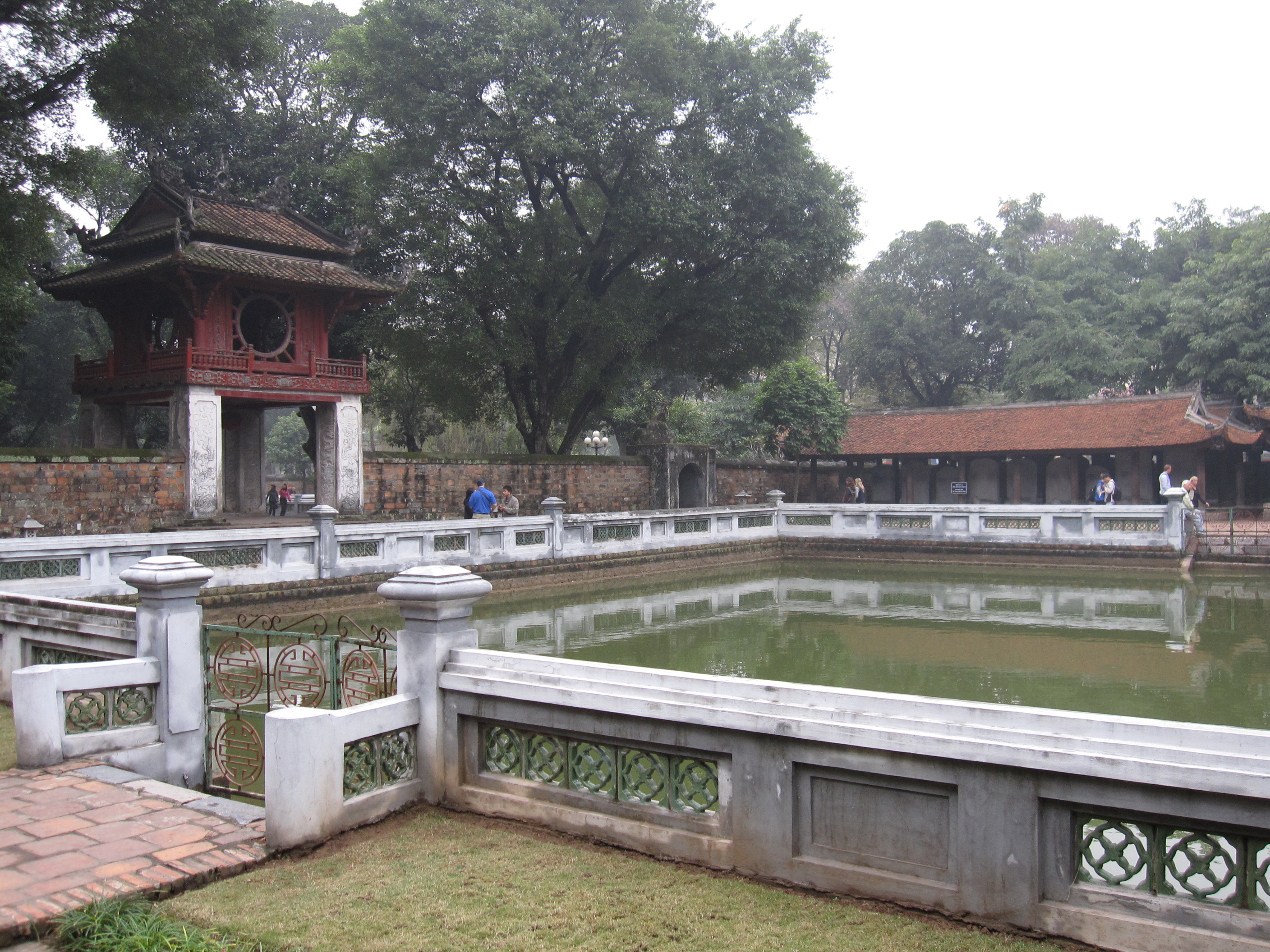
Temple of Literature, Hanoi, served as royal school during 11th–18th centuries.

In the 1460s, Lê Thánh Tông carried out a series of reforms, including centralizing the government, building the first extensive bureaucracy and strong fiscal system, and institutionalizing education, trade, and laws. He greatly reduced the power of the traditional Buddhist aristocracy with a scholar-literati class, and ushered a brief golden age. Classical scholarism, literature (in nom script), science, music, and culture flourished. Hanoi emerged as the centre of learning of Southeast Asia in the 15th century. Lê Thánh Tông's reforms helped heightened the power of the king and the bureaucratic system, allowing him to mobilize a more massive army and resources that overawed the local nobility and capable to expand the Việt territories.

To expand the kingdom, Lê Thánh Tông launched an invasion of Champa in early 1471 that brought destruction to the Cham civilization and made the rump state of Kauthara a vassal of Đại Việt. In response to disputes with Laos over Muang Phuan and the mistreatment of the Laotian envoy, Lê Thánh Tông led a strong army that invaded Laos in 1479, sacked Luang Phabang, occupied it for five years, and advanced as far as Upper Burma. Vietnamese products, particularly porcelain, were sold throughout Southeast Asia, China, Japan, Iran, Turkey, and on the East African.

==== Decline and civil war ====
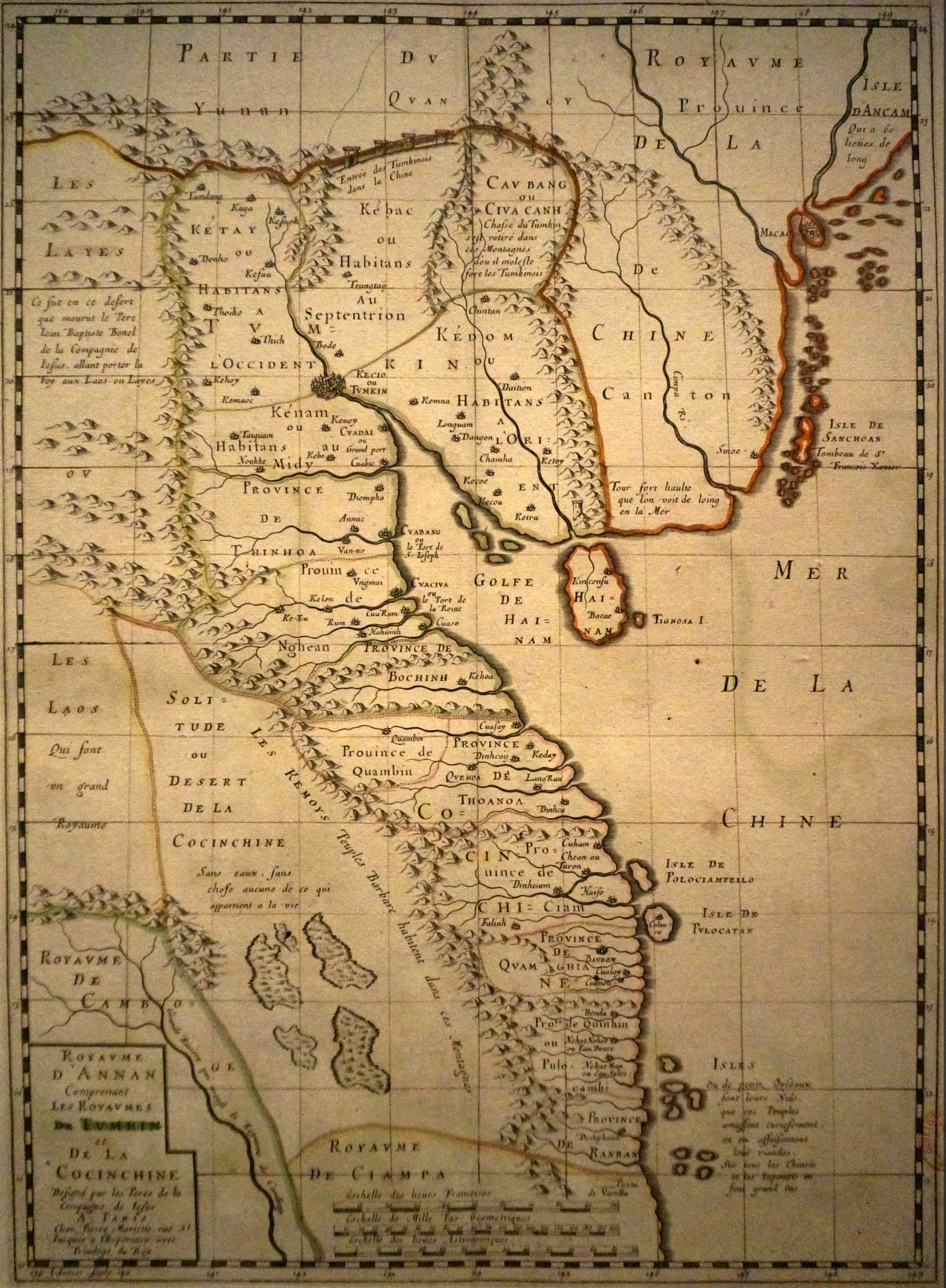
French map representing political divisions of the Đại Việt kingdom during the 17th century: the northern part (Tonkin) was ruled by the Trịnh family, while the south (Cochinchina) was controlled by the Nguyễn dynasty. (1653)

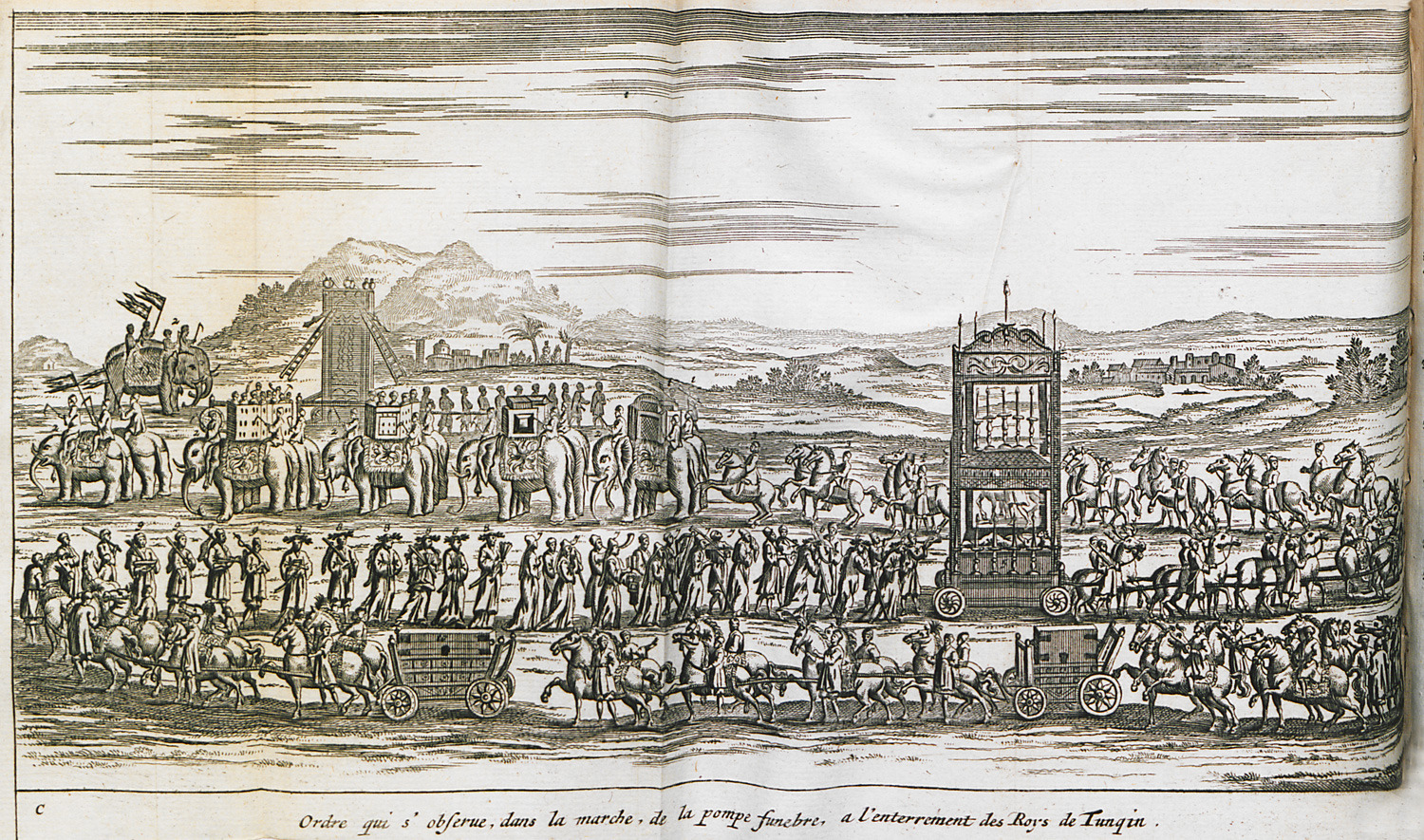
Painting depicting the funeral of lord Trịnh Tùng, who ruled northern Đại Việt from 1572 to 1623 as military dictator.

In the decades after Lê Thánh Tông's death in 1497, Đại Việt once again fell to civil unrest. Agricultural failures, rapid population growth, corruption, and factionalism all compounded to stress the kingdom, leading to a rapid decline. Eight weak Lê kings briefly held power. During the reign of Lê Uy Mục—known as the "devil king" (r. 1505–1509)— fighting erupted between the two rival Thanh Hoá families in the cadet branch, the Trịnh, and the Nguyễn on behalf of the ruling dynasty. Lê Tương Dực (r. 1509–1514) tried to restore stability, but chaotic political struggles and rebellions returned years later. In 1516, a Buddhist peasant rebellion led by Trần Cảo stormed the capital, killed the emperor, and plundered and destroyed the royal palace along with its library. The Trịnh and Nguyễn clans briefly ceased hostilities, suppressed Trần Cảo, and installed the young prince Lê Chiêu Tông (r. 1516–1522), after which they turned against each other and forced the king to flee.

=== Mạc dynasty (1527–1593) ===
The chaos prompted Mạc Đăng Dung, a military officer well-educated in Confucian classics, to rise up and try to restore order. By 1522, he effectively subjugated the two warring clans and put down the rebellions while establishing his clan and supporters to the government. In 1527, he forced the young Lê king to abdicate and proclaimed himself emperor, beginning the rule of the Mạc dynasty. Six years later, Nguyễn Kim—a Nguyễn noble and Lê loyalist-rebelled against the Mạc-enthroned Lê Duy Ninh, a descendant of Lê Lợi, who began the monarchy-in-exile in Laos. In 1542, they reemerged from the south under the moniker of the "southern court", laid claim to the Vietnamese crown, and opposed the Mạc (the "northern court"). The Việt kingdom now fell into a long period of decentralization, chaos, and civil wars that lasted for three centuries.

The Lê (assisted by Nguyễn Kim) and the Mạc loyalists fought on behalf of reclaiming the legitimate Vietnamese crown. When Nguyễn Kim died in 1545, the power of the Lê dynasty swiftly fell into the dictate of Trịnh Kiểm of the Trịnh family. One of Nguyễn Kim's sons, Nguyễn Hoàng, was appointed ruler of the southern part of the kingdom, thus beginning the Nguyễn family rule over Đàng Trong.

=== Revival of Lê dynasty: Trịnh control and Trịnh-Nguyễn contention (1593–1789) ===
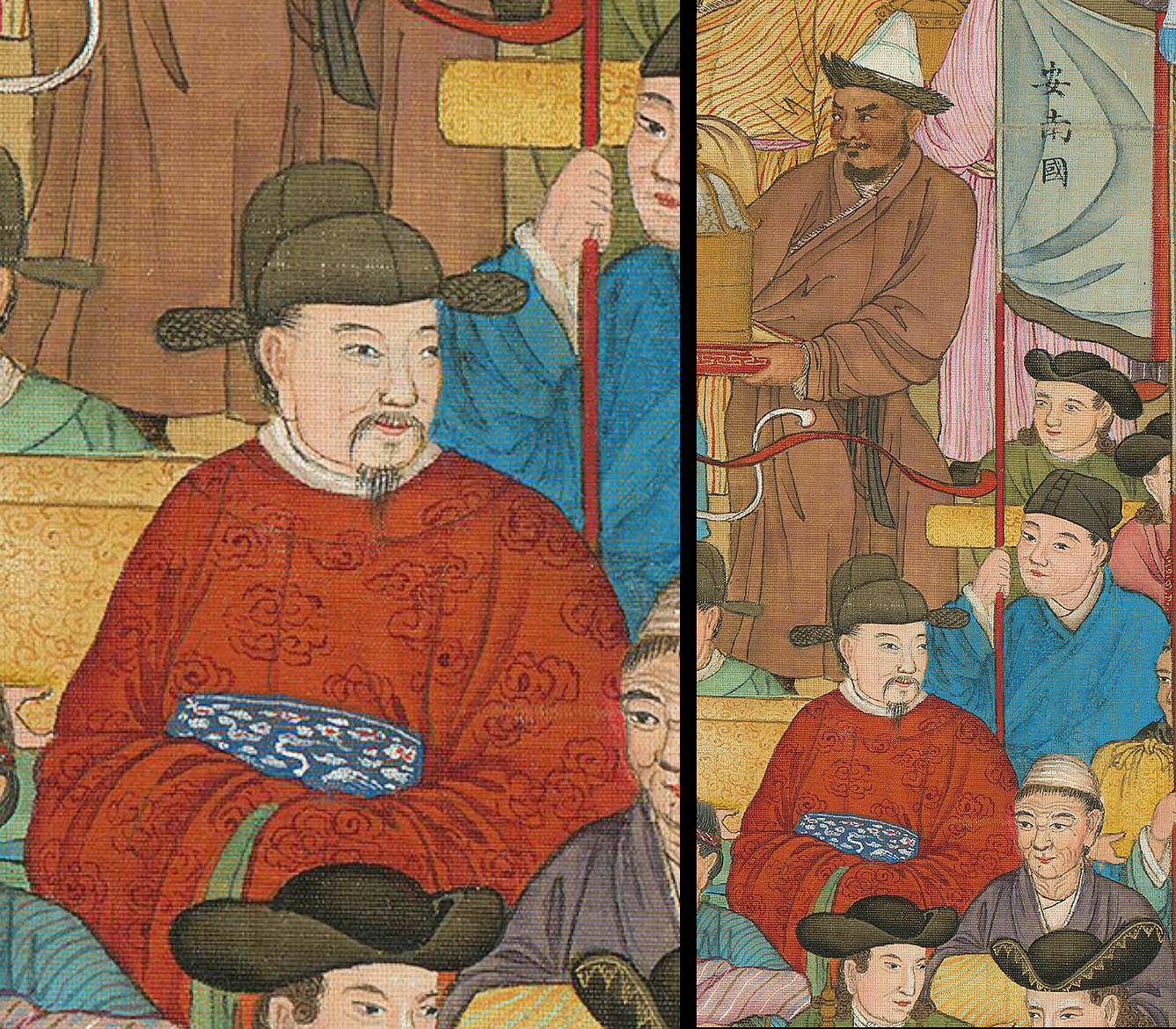
Annam (安南国) delegates in Beijing in 1761 (close-up from the painting 万国来朝图)

The Lê-Trịnh loyalists expelled the Mạc from Hanoi in 1592, forcing them to flee into the mountainous hinterland, where their reign lasted until 1677.

The Trịnh-controlled northern Đại Việt was known as Đàng Ngoài ("outer realm"), while the Nguyễn-controlled south became Đàng Trong ("inner realm"). They fought a 50-year civil war (1627–1673) that ended inconclusively, and the two lords signed a peace treaty. This stable division would last until 1771, when three Tây Sơn brothers—Nguyễn Nhạc, Nguyễn Huệ, and Nguyễn Lữ—led a peasant revolution that would overrun and topple the Nguyễn, the Trịnh lords, and the Le dynasty. In 1789, the Tây Sơn defeated a Qing intervention that sought to restore the Lê dynasty.

=== Tây Sơn wars and Nguyễn dynasty (1789–1804) ===
Nguyễn Nhạc established a monarchy in 1778 (Thái Đức), followed by his brother Nguyễn Huệ (Emperor Quang Trung, r. 1789–1792) and nephew Nguyễn Quang Toản (Emperor Cảnh Thịnh, r. 1792–1802), while a descendant of the Nguyễn lords, Nguyễn Ánh, returned to the Mekong Delta after several years of exile in Thailand and France. Ten years later, Nguyễn loyalists defeated the Tây Sơn and conquered the whole kingdom. Nguyễn Ánh became the emperor Gia Long of the new unified Vietnamese state.

== Political structure ==
=== Pre-1200s ===
In the early Đại Việt period (pre-1200), the Viet monarchy existed as a form of what historians describe as a "charter state" or a "mandala state". In 1973, Minoru Katakura used the term "centralized feudal system" to describe the Lý dynasty's Viet state. Yumio Sakurai reconstructed the Lý dynasty as a local dynasty—signifying that it was only able to control several inner areas, while outer areas (phu) were autonomously governed by local clans of various ethnolinguistic backgrounds, who were loyal to the royal clan through Buddhist alliances, such as temples. The Viet king "man of prowess" was the center of the mandala structure that had influences beyond the Red River Delta via Buddhist alliance with local lords, while a bureaucracy was still practically nonexistent. For example, an inscription dating from 1107 in Hà Giang records the religious–political connection between the Nùng Hà clan with the dynasty, or another inscription dated to 1100 commemorates Lý Thường Kiệt as the lord of Thanh Hoá. As a mandala realm, according to F. K. Lehman, its direct territories could not exceed more than 150 miles in diameter; however, the Đại Việt kingdom was able to maintain a large sphere of influence due to active coastal trade and maritime activities with other Southeast Asian states.

=== Trần-Hồ period ===
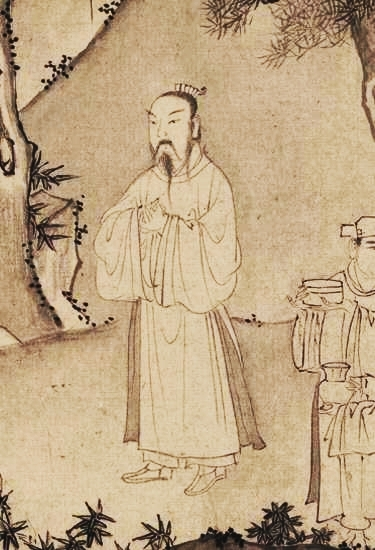
Trần Anh Tông, the fourth emperor of the Trần dynasty

During the 13th and 14th centuries, as the Trần dynasty ruled the kingdom, their first move was to prevent matrilineal clans taking over the royal family, by adopting the king–retired king relation, in which the emperor usually abdicated in favor of his eldest son while retaining power behind the scenes, and practicing consanguine marriage. To prevent maternal families' influences, Trần kings took only queens from their dynastic lineage. The state became more centralized, taxes and bureaucracy appeared, and chronicles were written down. Most power was concentrated in the hands of the emperor and the royal families. In the lowlands, the Trần removed all non-Trần, autonomous aristocratic clans from power and appointed Trần princes instead, tightening relations between the state and locals. Working in Trần princely lands were serfs: poor peasants who owned no land nor slaves. Large hydraulic projects such as the Red River Delta's dyke system were constructed, maintaining and increasing the kingdom's rice-based agricultural economy and its population by diverting rivers to aid in irrigation. Confucianism was ensured by the Trần monarchs as the second belief, giving rise to the literati class, which later became rivals to the established Buddhist clergy.

During this period, the Việt monarchy faced a series of massive Yuan and Cham invasions, political unrest, famines, disasters, and diseases, and was led to near-collapse in the late 1300s. Hồ Quý Ly tried to fix these troubles by eliminating the Trần aristocrats, limiting monks, and promoting Chinese classic learning, but this resulted in political catastrophe.

=== Early modern period ===
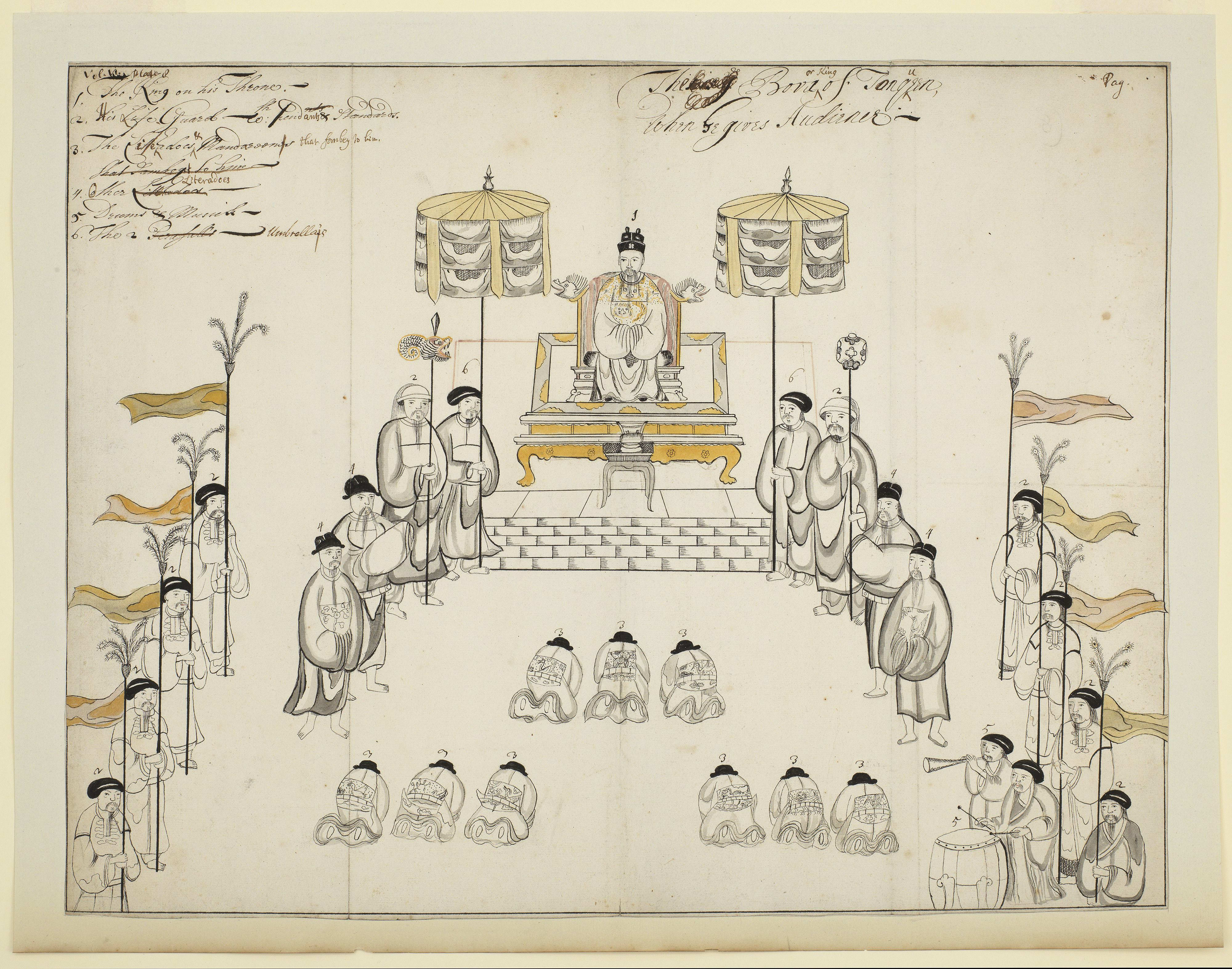
Painting depicts emperor Lê Hy Tông (r. 1675–1705) giving an audience (c. 1685).

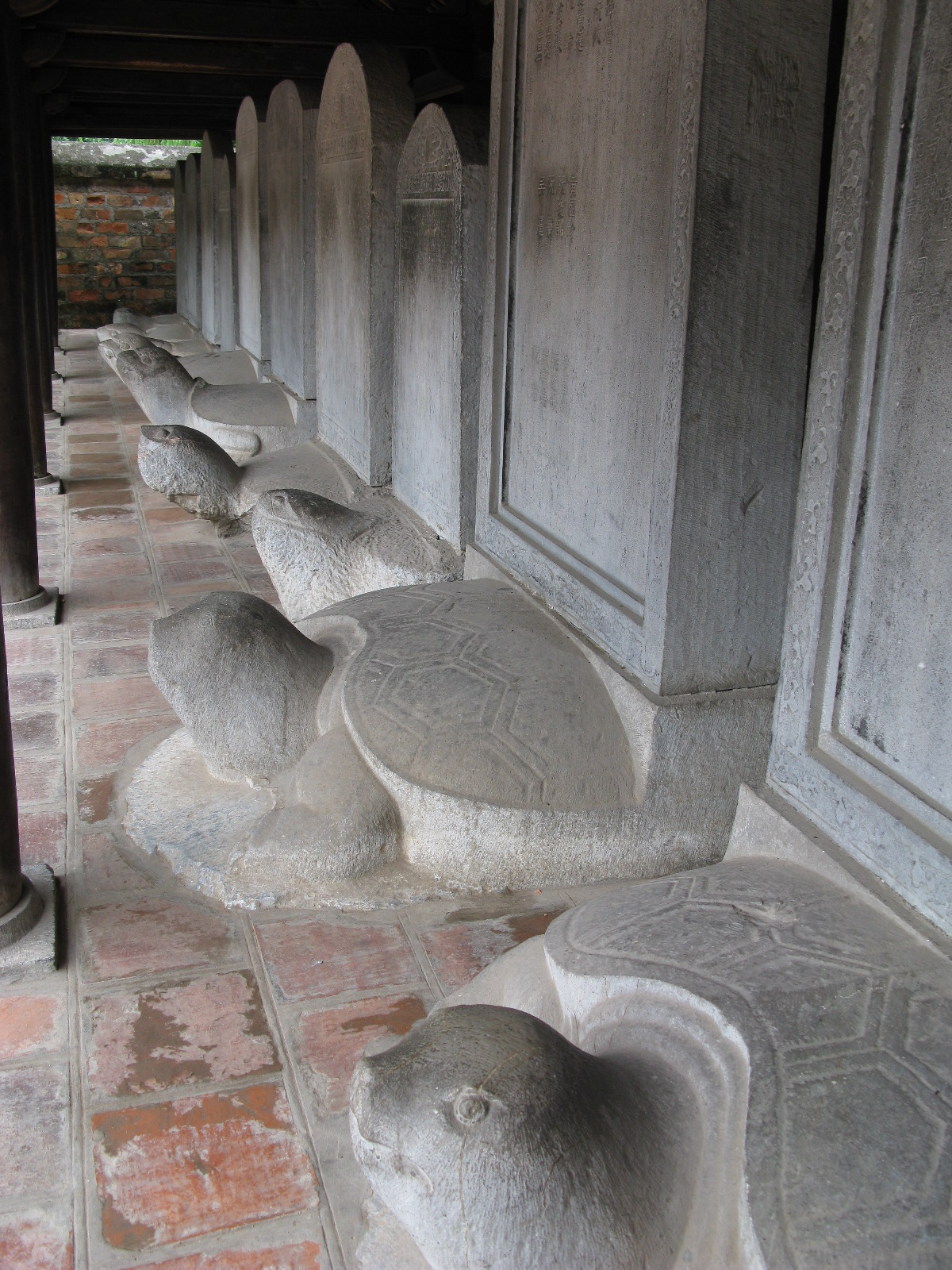
Steles inscribed with names of graduate scholars in Quốc Tử Giám, Hanoi

From Lê Thánh Tông's 1463 reforms onward, the Vietnamese state's structure was modeled after the Ming dynasty of China. Lê established six ministries and six courts, centralizing the government. By 1471, Đại Việt was divided into 12 provinces and one capital city (Thăng Long), each governed by a provincial government that consisted military commanders, civil administrators, and judicial officers. Lê employed 5,300 officials in the bureaucracy. A new legal code, called the Lê Code, was published in 1462 and was practiced until 1803.

As a Confucian king, Lê generally disliked cosmopolitanism and foreign trade. He banned slavery, which had been popular during previous centuries, and limited trade and commerce. During his reign, power was based on institutional obligations that enforced loyalty to court and merits, rather than a religious relationship between aristocracy and the royal court. Self-sufficient agriculture and state-monopolized crafts were encouraged.

The social hierarchy of 15th-century Đại Việt comprised:

- Vua/Hoàng Đế – Emperor
- Hoàng Tử – Crown prince
- Vương – Ordinary princes
- Công – Duke
- Hầu – Marquis
- Bá – Count

Non-royal nobility:

- Tử – Viscount
- Nam – Baron

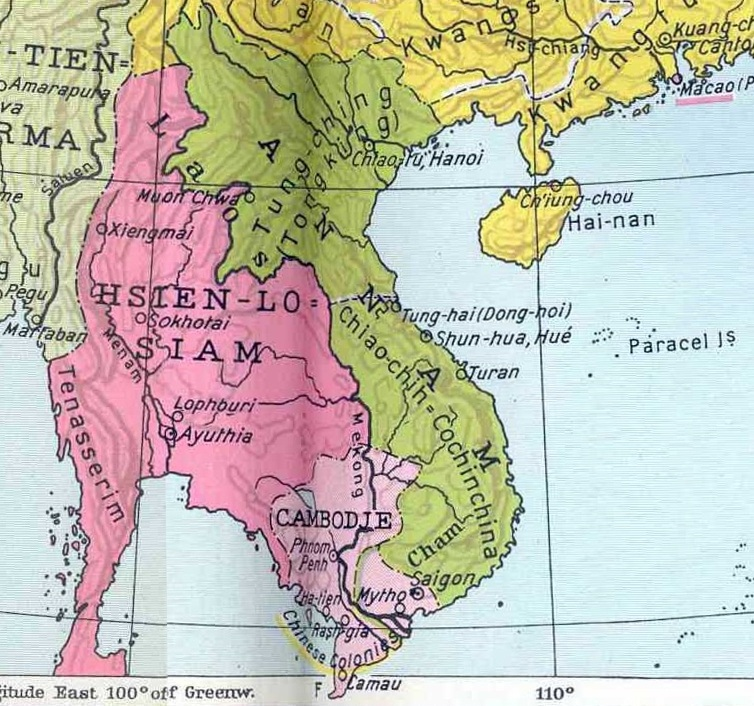
Đại Việt, or Annam, during the mid-18th century, politically divided near the 18th parallel north, between the Trinh and Nguyen domains.

After the death of Lê Thánh Tông in 1497, the sociopolitical order he had built gradually fell apart as Đại Việt entered its chaotic disintegration period under the reigns of his weak successors. Social upheavals, ecological crisis, corruption, an irreparably failing system, political rivalry, and rebellions pushed the kingdom to a climactic burst of civil war between rival clans. The last Lê king was overthrown by general Mạc Đăng Dung in 1527, who promised to restore "Lê Thánh Tông's golden era of stability". For the next six decades, from 1533 to 1592, the raging civil war between Lê loyalists and Mạc ruined much of the polity. The Trịnh and Nguyễn clans both assisted the Lê loyalists in their struggle against Mạc.

After the Lê-Mạc war ended in 1592, with the Mạc ousted from the Red River Delta, the two clans of Trịnh and Nguyễn, who revived the Lê dynasty, emerged as the strongest powers and resumed their own infighting, from 1627 to 1672. The northern Trịnh clan had installed themselves as regents for the Lê dynasty by 1545, but in reality, they held most power at the royal court and were the de facto rulers of the northern half of Đại Việt. They began using the title Chúa ("lord"), which was outside the classical hierarchy of nobility. The Lê king was reduced to a figurehead, ruling in earnest while the Trịnh lord had total power to enthrone or remove any king he favored. The southern Nguyễn leader also began to proclaim himself a Chúa lord in 1558. Initially, these were considered subjects of the Lê court, which was controlled by the Trịnh lord. By the early 1600s, however, they ruled southern Đại Việt like an independent kingdom and became the main rivals to the Trịnh domain. Lê Thánh Tông's legacy, such as his 1463 Code and bureaucratic institutions, was revived in the north and somehow continued to persist, lasting until the French Indochina period.

Before and after the war, the two Thanh Hoá clans divided the kingdom into two coexistent but rival regimes: the northern Đàng Ngoài, or Tonkin, ruled by the Trịnh family, and the southern Đàng Trong, or Cochinchina, ruled by the Nguyễn family; their natural border was the city of Đồng Hới (18th parallel north). Each polity had its own independent court. However, the Nguyễn lord still sought to subordinate himself under the Lê dynasty, which also stayed under Trịnh supervision, maintaining an imaginary union. Paying homage and respect to the Lê king remained a source of both lords' legitimacy and of adherence to the idea of a unified Vietnamese state, even if such a thing no longer existed.

The Tay Son rebellion of the late 18th century was an extraordinary moment of Đại Việt's chaotic period, when the three Tay Son brothers divided the kingdom into three subordinate, independent realms: Nguyen Hue controlled the north, Nguyen Nhac the center, and Nguyen Lu controlled the Mekong Delta.

=== Economy ===
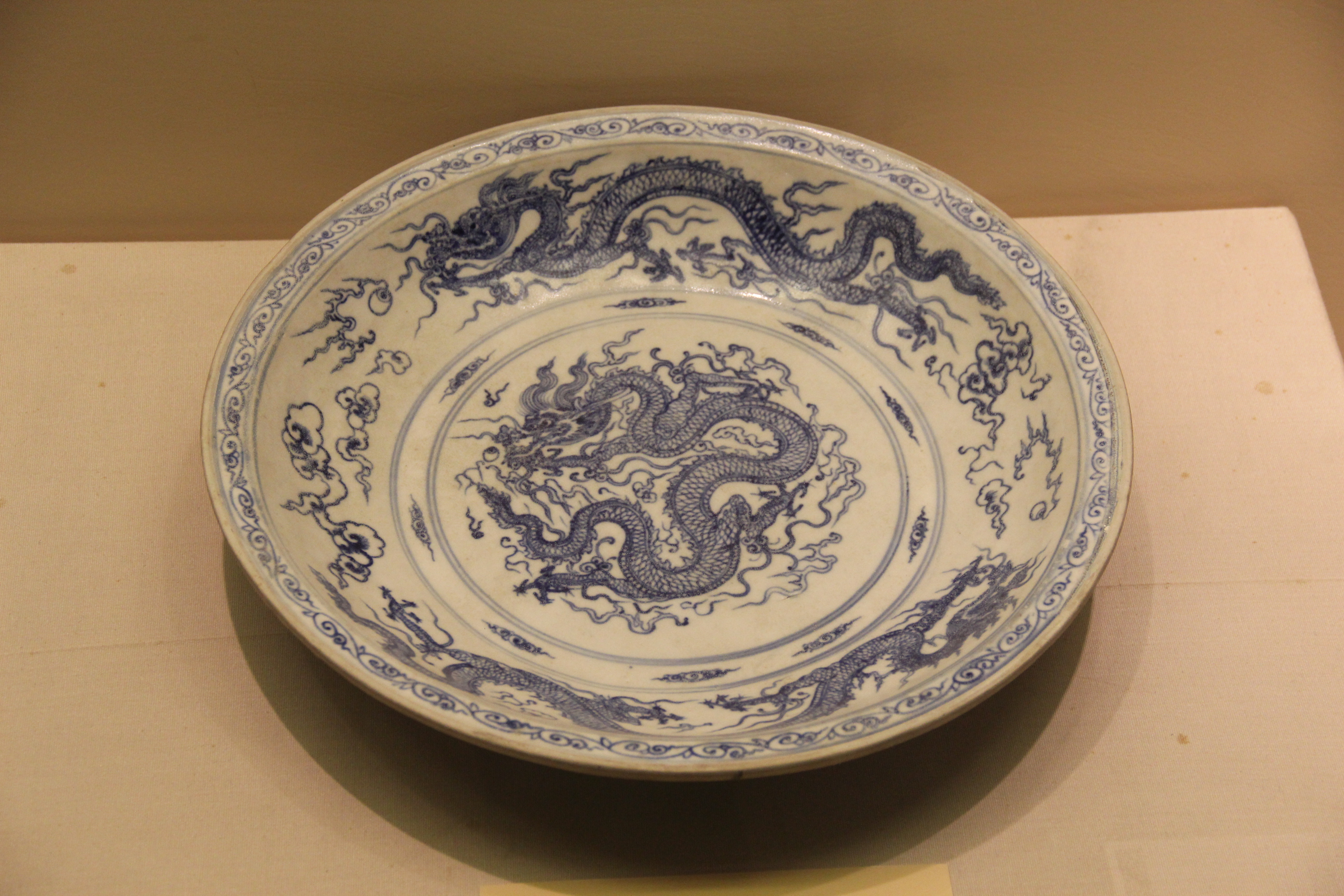
A 15th-century Vietnamese blue-white ceramic dish. National Museum of Vietnamese History

Fan Chengda (1126–1193), a Chinese statesman and geographer, wrote an account in 1176 that described the medieval Vietnamese economy:

...Local [Annamite] products include such things as gold and silver, bronze, cinnabar, pearls, cowry [shells], rhinoceros [horn], elephant, kingfisher feathers, giant clams, and various aromatics, as well as salt, lacquer, and kapok...

...Travelers to the Southern Counties [Southern China] entice people there to serve [in Annam] as female slaves and male bearers. But when they reach the [Man] counties and settlements, they are tied up and sold off. One slave can fetch two taels of gold. The counties and settlements then turn around and sell them in Jiaozhi [Hanoi], where they fetch three taels of gold. Each year no fewer than 100,000 people [are sold off as slaves]. For those with skills, the price in gold doubles...

Unlike its southern neighbor Champa, medieval (900–1500 AD) Đại Việt was mostly an agricultural kingdom, centered around the Red River Delta. Most stele epigraphs discussing the economy from this period concerned land reclamation, maintaining irrigation system from the Red River, maintaining fields, harvesting, and the king's land donation to Buddhist clergies. Trade was not primarily important in Đại Việt, although the kingdom's ceramic exports blossomed for several decades during the 15th century. Lê Thánh Tông, the greatest king of the 15th century, who had conquered Champa, once said, "Do not cast aside the roots (agriculture) and pursue insignificant trade/(commerce)", showcasing his unfavorable views toward trade and merchandising.

Đại Việt's only port, located at the mouth of the Red River—a town called Van Don—near Ha Long Bay, was considered too far away from the main sea route. Marco Polo, who did not visit but gathered information from the Mongols, offered a description of Đại Việt: "They find in this country a good deal of gold, and they also have a great abundance of spices. But they are such a long way from the sea that the products are of little value, and thus their price is low". Most Southeast Asian and Indian merchant ships sailing along the Vietnamese coast of the South China Sea often stopped at Champa's port cities, bypassed Đại Việt and the Gulf of Tonkin, and headed on to southeastern China.

Compared to the more well-known Champa, Đại Việt was little-known to the faraway world until the arrival of Spanish and Portuguese explorers in the 16th century. Medieval sources such as Ibn al-Nadim's The Book Catalogue (c. 988 AD) mention that the king of Luqin, or Lukin (Đại Việt), invaded the state of Sanf (Champa) in 982. Đại Việt was included in the Arab geographer Muhammad al-Idrisi's world atlas, the Tabula Rogeriana. In the early 1300s, Đại Việt was briefly chronicled by Persian historian Rashid al-Din in his Ilkhanid annals as Kafje-Guh, which was the rendition of a Mongol/Chinese toponym for Đại Việt, Jiaozhiquo.

== Art and religion ==
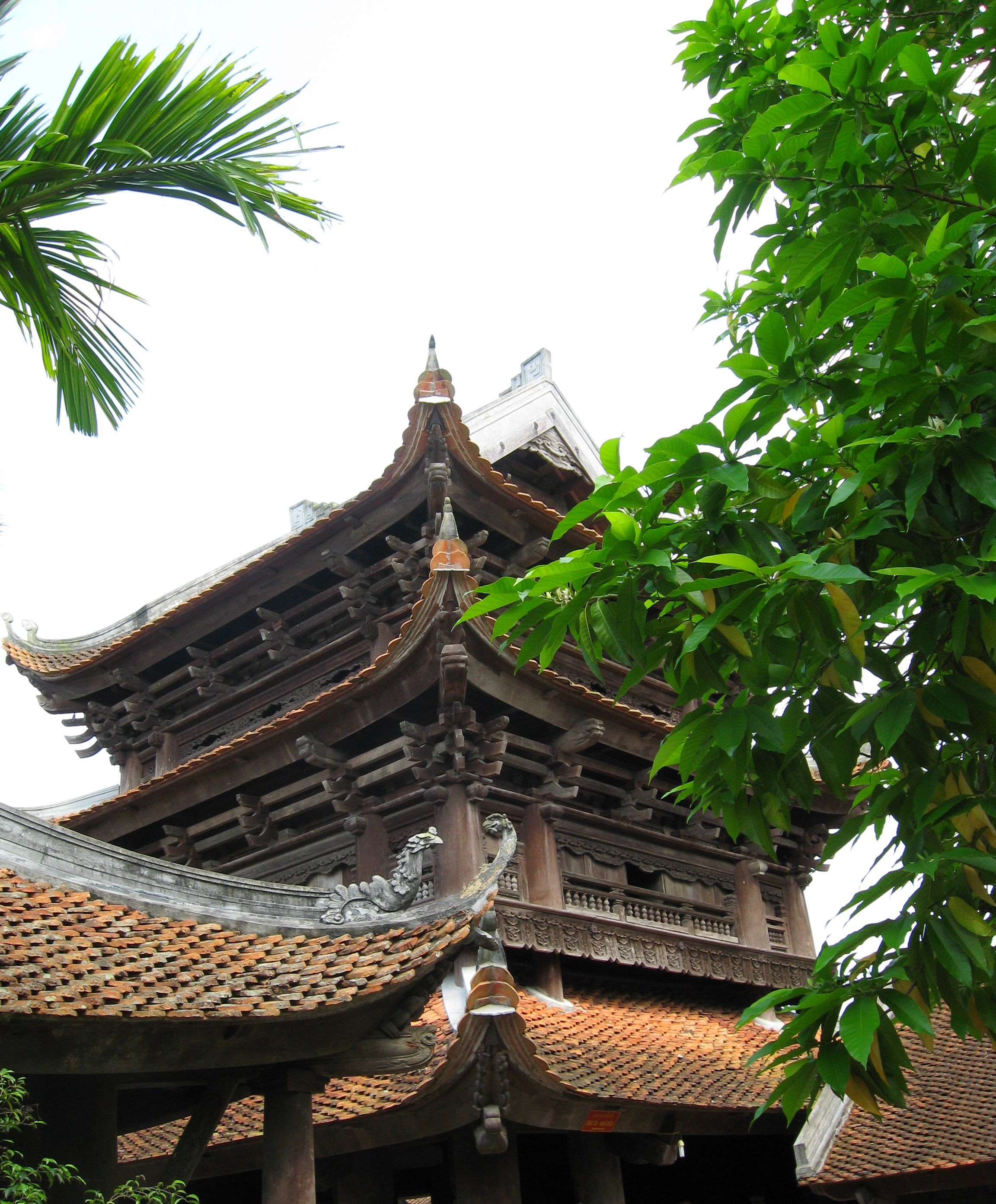
Timber steeple of the Keo Temple (c. 1630)

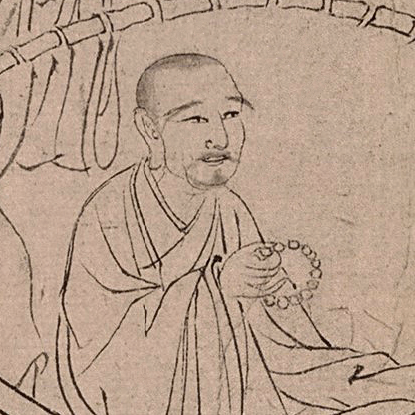
Emperor Trần Nhân Tông (1258–1308), the founder of the Trúc Lâm sect

Buddhism had penetrated to modern-day Vietnam around the first century AD, during the Han occupation. By the 8th century, Mahayana Buddhism had become the dominant faith of the Red River Delta Region. The development of Mahayana faiths in the area gave rise to several Buddhist dynasties that would rule Đại Việt. The epigraphy of Thanh Mai inscription (c. 798) indicates that Chinese-influenced Buddhism was widely practiced among the Red River dwellers during the Tang period. Buddhist scriptures claim that in 580, an Indian monk named Vinītaruci arrived in northern Vietnam and founded the Thiền school of Zen Buddhism. In 820, a Chinese monk named Wu Yantong came to northern Vietnam and founded the second Thiền sect, which lasted until the 13th century. In 1293, Emperor Trần Nhân Tông personally opened a new Thiền school, called Trúc Lâm, which is still active today.

Vietnamese Buddhism gained reached its apex during the medieval period. The king, the court, and society were deeply religious. According to Đinh Liễn's Ratnaketu Dhāraṇī inscriptions (c. 973), Mahayana Buddhism and some elements of Tantric Buddhism were promoted by the emperor and the royals. Mahayana sutras, together with the prince's speech, were inscribed on these pillars. The inscription of Lê Đại Hành (c. 995), however, mentions Thiền Buddhism as the royal religion. By the early 11th century, Mahayana, Hinduism, folk beliefs, and spiritual worship was fused and formed into a new creed by Ly royals, who frequently performed Buddhist rituals, blood oaths, and prayed for spiritual deities. This syncretic religion, dubbed "Ly dynasty religion" by Taylor, embraces the amalgamating worship of Buddhism, Indian Buddhist deities Indra and Brahma, and the Cham folk legend Lady Po Nagar. The Lý dynasty religion was later absorbed into Vietnamese folk religion. The emperors built temples and statues dedicated to Indra and Brahma in 1016, 1057, and 1134, along with temples for Vietnamese legends. At a funeral, the emperor's body was put on a pyre to be burned, according to Buddhist tradition. The main characteristics of Vietnamese Buddhism were largely influenced by Chinese Chan Buddhists. A temple inscription dated from 1226 in Hanoi describes a Vietnamese Buddhist altar: "the Buddha statue was flanked by an Apsara, one of the Hindu water and cloud nymphs, and a Bodhisattva with a clenched fist. Before the altar stood statues of a Guardian of the Dharma flanked by Mỹ Âm, king of the Gandharvas, mythical musician husbands of the Apsaras, and Kauṇḍinya, the Buddha's leading early disciple."

The Buddhist sangha, sponsored by the royals, owned the majority of farmlands and the kingdom's wealth. A stele erected in 1209 records that the royal family had donated 126 acres of land to a pagoda. A Vietnamese Buddhist temple was often built of timber and had a pagoda/stupa made of bricks or granite rocks. Việt Buddhist art shares similarities with Cham art, especially its sculptures. The dragon bodhi leaf sculpture symbolizes the emperor, while the phoenix bodhi leaf stands for the queen. Buddhism shaped society and laws during the Ly dynasty of Đại Việt. Princes and royals were raised in Buddhist monasteries and were ordained into the monkhood.

Vietnamese Buddhism declined in the 15th century due to the Ming-Chinese Neo-Confucian anti-Buddhist agenda and later Le monarchs' downplaying of Buddhism, but it was revived in the 16th–18th centuries by the royal family, which resulted in Vietnam today being a majority-Buddhist country. In the south, due to the effort of Chinese monk Shilian Dashan in 1694–1695, the entire Nguyễn family converted from secularism to Buddhism. The Nguyễn also incorporated local Cham deities into southern Vietnamese Buddhism. The Đình (village temples), which persisted from the 15th century, were the centres of village administration and prohibited Buddhist-based cults and local deities.

Vietnamese Buddhist temples

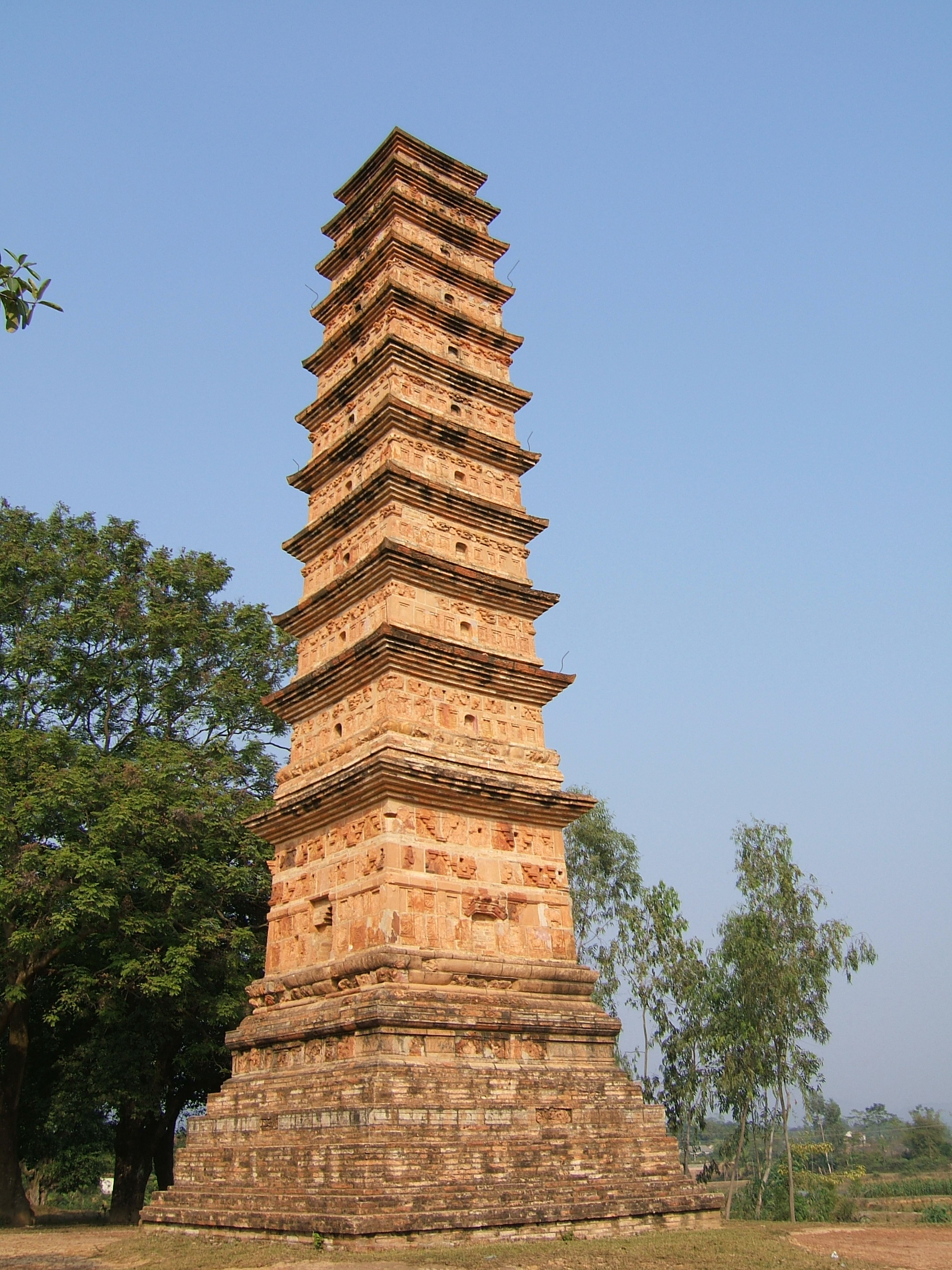
Bình Sơn Pagoda, Vĩnh Phúc, built around c. 1200

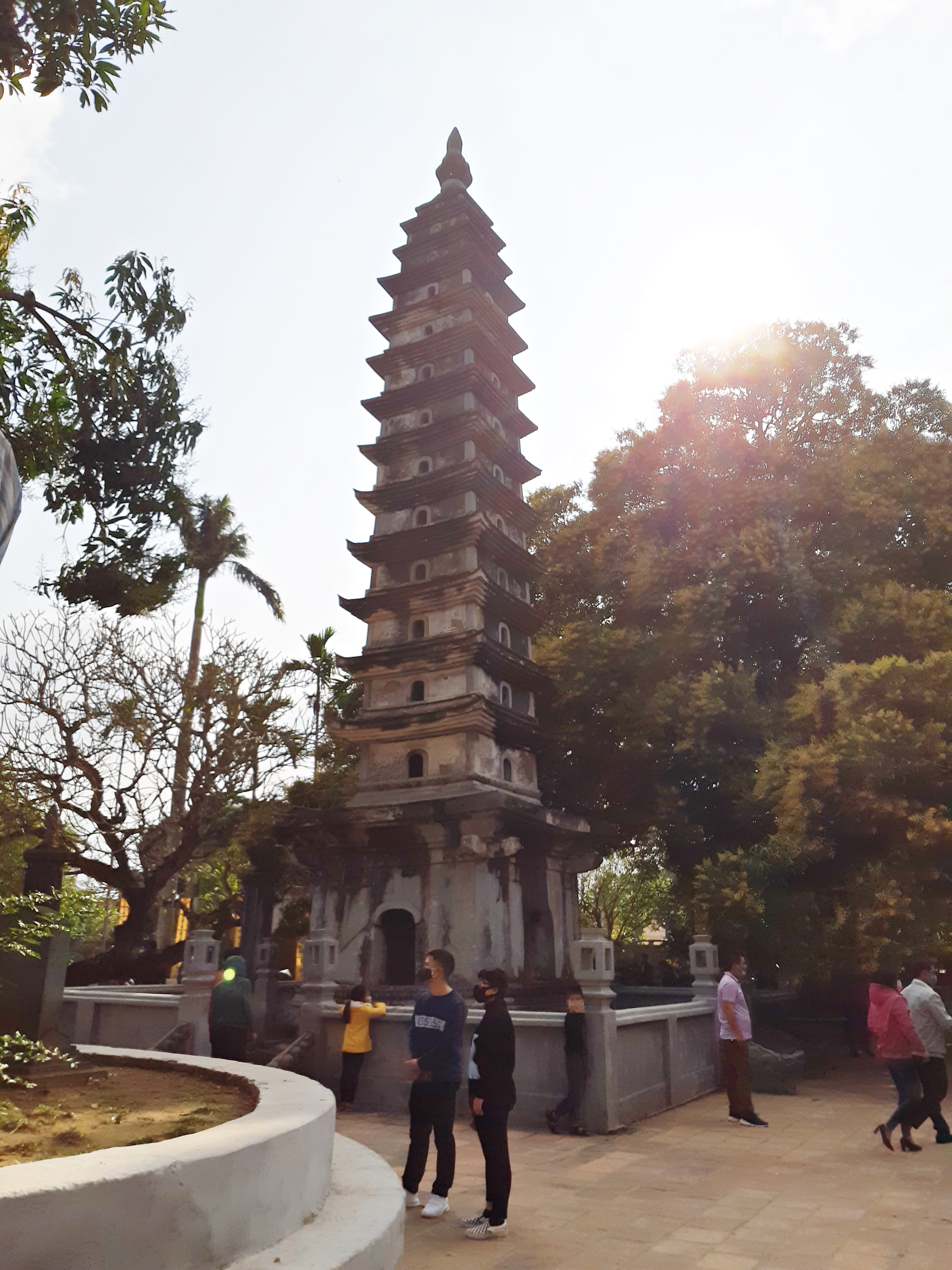
Phổ Minh Temple, built c. 1262

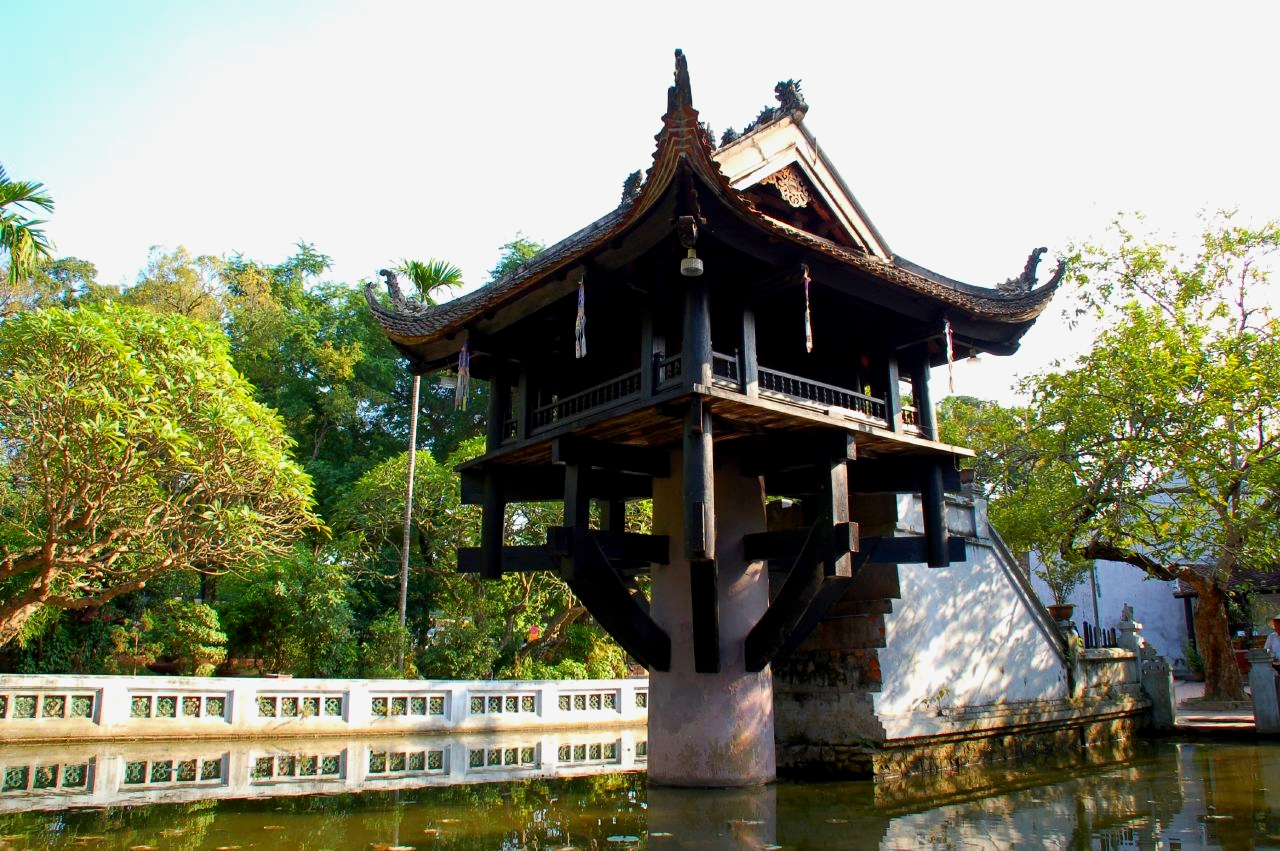
The One Pillar Pagoda, constructed c. 1050 by Emperor Lý Thái Tông and destroyed in 1952

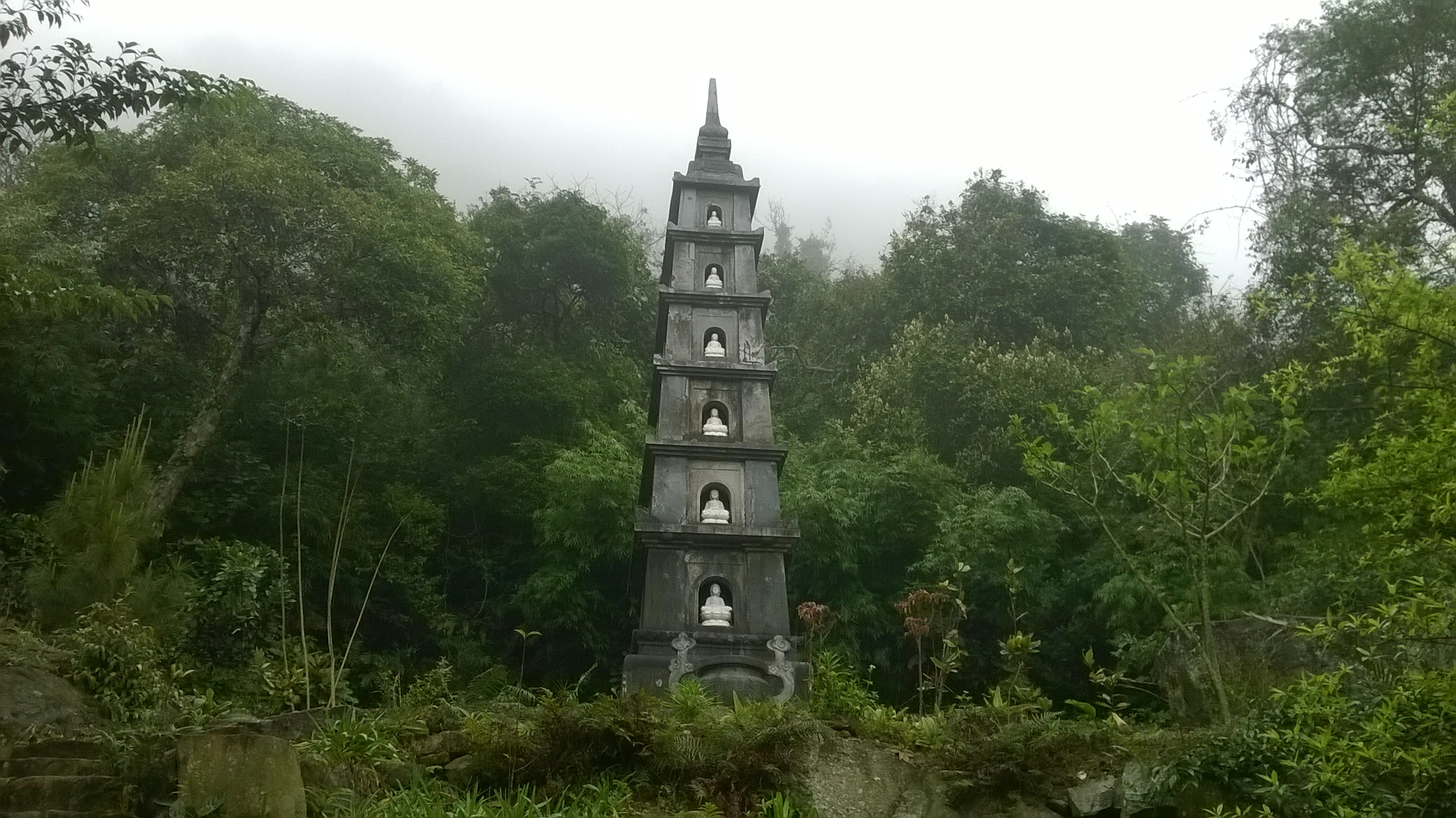
A 14th-century pagoda in the jungles of Quảng Ninh

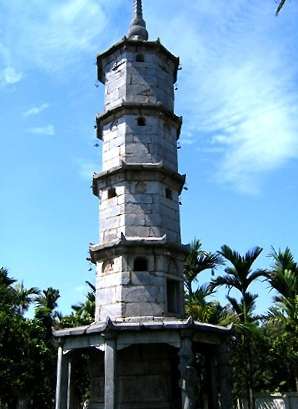
Bảo Nghiêm Pagoda, in Bút Tháp Temple, built c. 1647

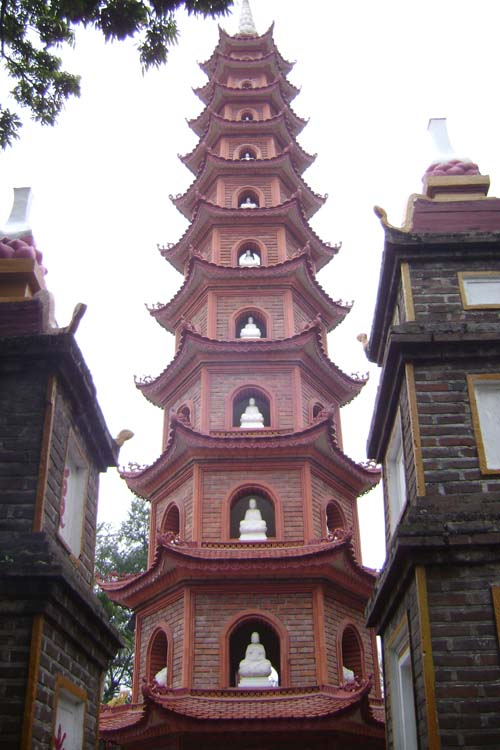
The pagoda of Trấn Quốc Pagoda, c. 1615

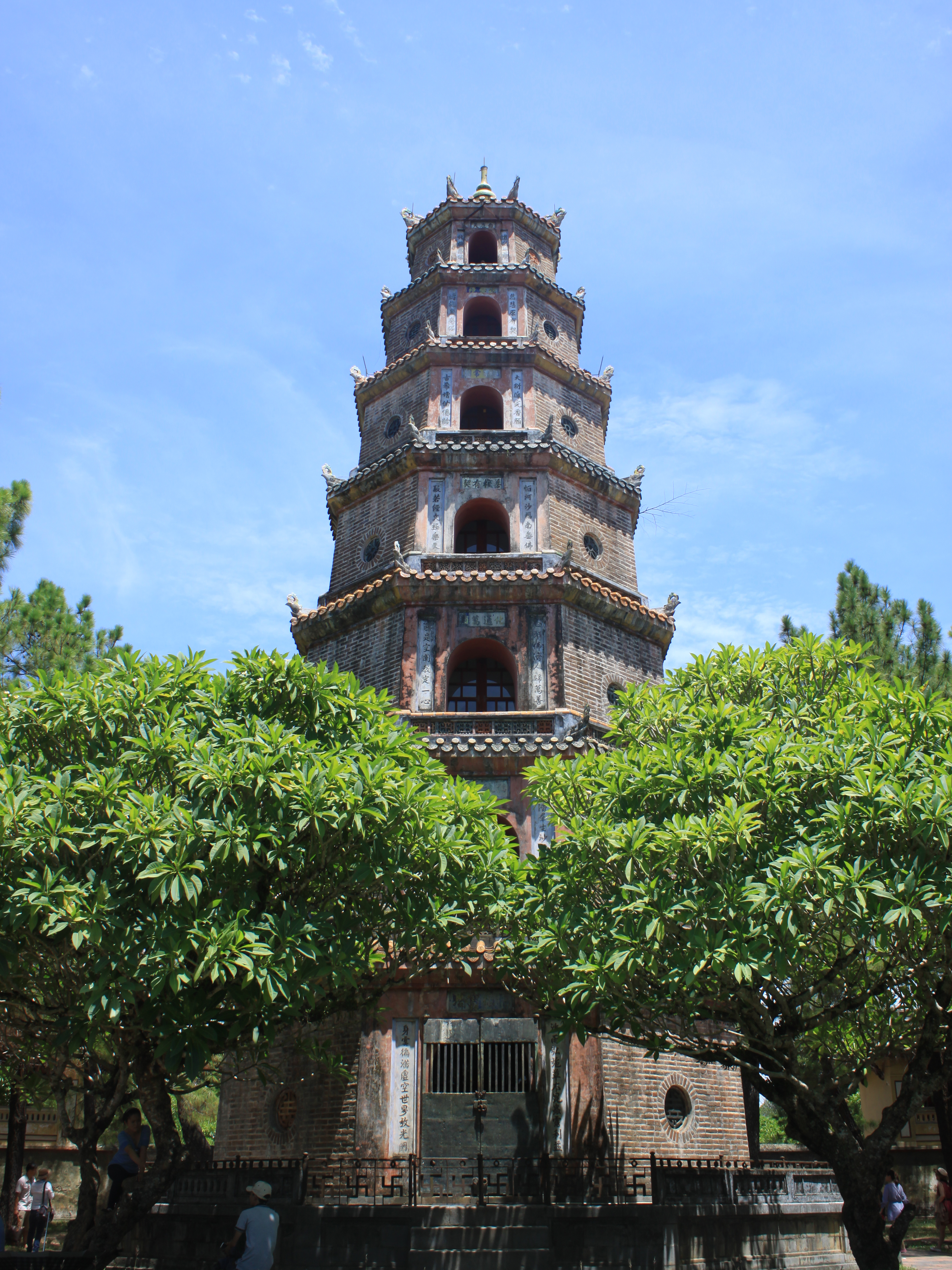
Thiên Mụ Temple, c. 1590

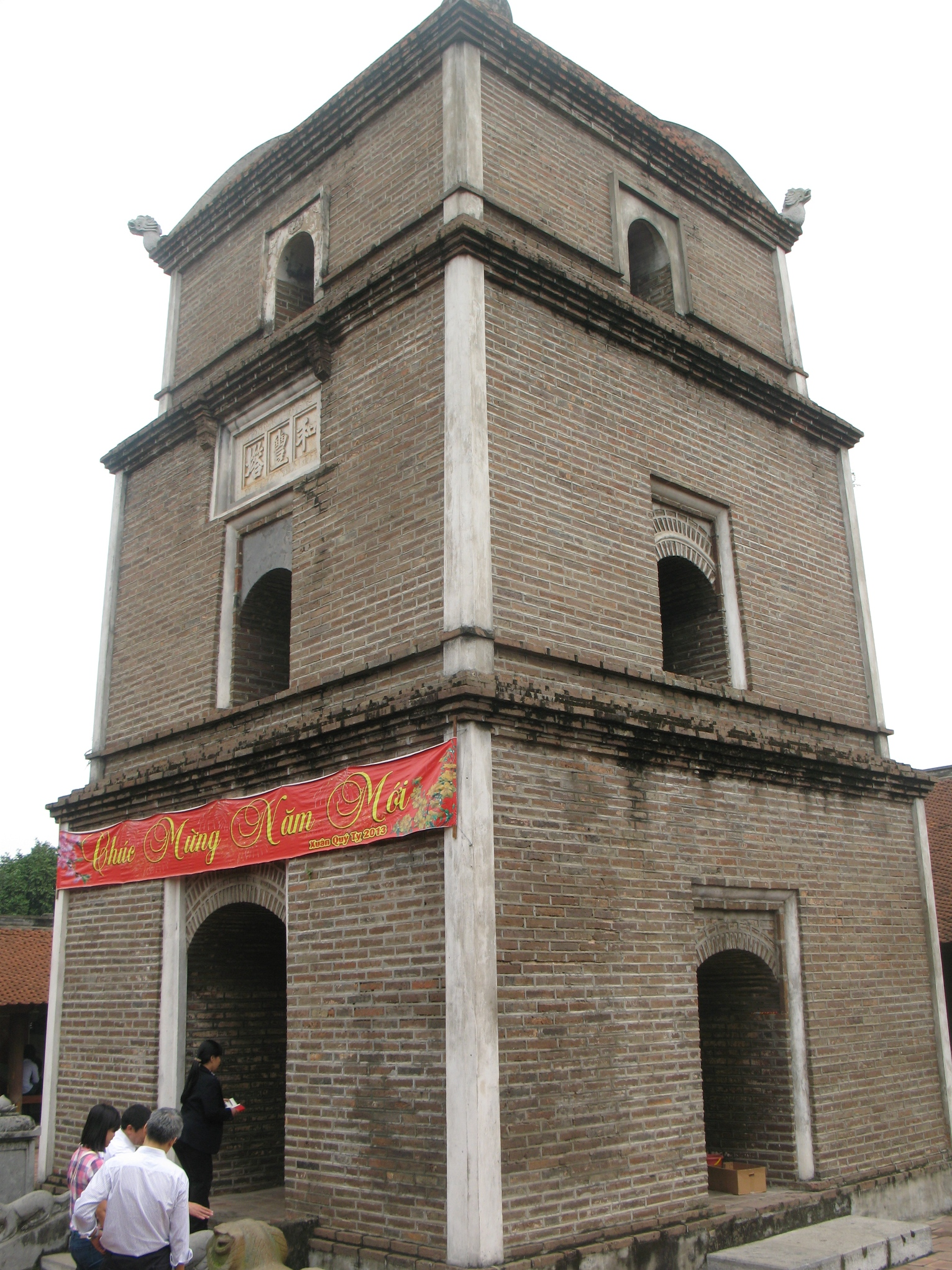
Dâu Temple, c. 1647

== Dynasty timeline ==
Đại Việt started in 968 and ended in 1804.

							Ming domination				Nam–Bắc triều * Bắc Hà–Nam Hà				French Indochina
Chinese domination	Ngô	Đinh	Early Lê	Lý	Trần	Hồ	Later Trần		Lê	Mạc	Revival Lê		Tây Sơn	Nguyễn		Modern time
											Trịnh lords
											Nguyễn lords
939			1009	1225	1400			1427	1527	1592		1788		1858	1945

History of Vietnam
(by names of Vietnam)
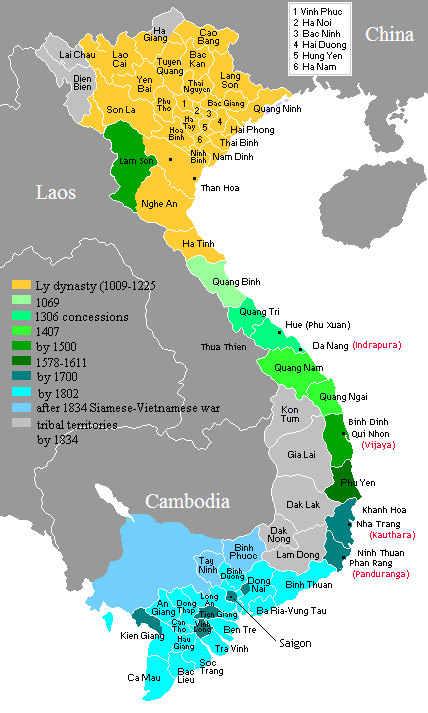

~2879–2524 BC	Xích Quỷ (Note: legendary)
~700–258 BC	Văn Lang
257–179 BC	Âu Lạc
204–111 BC	Nam Việt
111 BC – 40 AD	Giao Chỉ
40–43	Lĩnh Nam
43–203	Giao Chỉ
203–544	Giao Châu
544–602	Vạn Xuân
602–679	Giao Châu
679–757	An Nam
757–766	Trấn Nam
766–866	An Nam
866–968	Tĩnh Hải quân
968–1054	Đại Cồ Việt
1054–1400	Đại Việt
1400–1407	Đại Ngu
1407–1427	Giao Chỉ
1428–1804	Đại Việt
1804–1839	Việt Nam
1839–1945	Đại Nam
1887–1954	Đông Dương
1945–	Việt Nam
Main template
History of Vietnam

== See also ==
- Champa
- List of monarchs of Việt Nam
