= Lê Khắc Xương =

Lê Khắc Xương (黎克昌, 1440 – 1476) was a prince of the Lê dynasty in Vietnam. He was the second prince of Emperor Lê Thái Tông, also elder brother of Emperor Lê Nhân Tông, and Emperor Lê Thánh Tông. He was given the title Cung vương (恭王, "Reverent Prince").

== Biography ==
Born in 1440, as a son of Emperor Lê Thái Tông and Lady Bùi thị of Đậu Liêu Bùi clan. His maternal grandfather is Bùi Cầm Hổ, one official in era of Emperor Lê Thái Tổ.

In Thiên Hưng Coup in 1460, Prince Lê Nghi Dân killed Emperor Lê Nhân Tông and then became the fourth emperor of Lê dynasty with the name of Thiên Hưng Đế, but after 8 months of his reign, he was disposed by a group of officials – notably Lê Lăng, Nguyễn Xí, Đinh Liệt. Officials who launched the coup wanted to put Prince Lê Khắc Xương to the throne, but he refused. Therefore, the youngest Prince Lê Tư Thành became the next ruler, Emperor Lê Thánh Tông.

However, during the early time of his reign, Emperor Lê Thánh Tông started to worry about his elder brother who should have been the real king, not him. He killed the official Lê Lăng, one of main leaders of coup, and drove Prince Lê Khắc Xương to suicide. Prince Lê Khắc Xương died in 1476 in Đông Kinh. His children were not allowed to keep the family name of the royal court as Lê, and all were requested to change their clan name to Bùi of their grandmother.

== See also ==
- Lê Thái Tông
- Lê Thánh Tông
