= Tân Lạc (disambiguation) =

Tân Lạc may refer to several places in Vietnam, including:

- Tân Lạc, Phú Thọ, a commune of Phú Thọ province
- Tân Lạc district, a former rural district of Hòa Bình Province
- Tân Lạc, Nghệ An, a former township and capital of Quỳ Châu District
- Tân Lạc, Lâm Đồng, a former commune of Bảo Lâm District, Lâm Đồng Province
