= Lam Sơn uprising =

Rebellion against Ming rule in Vietnam (1418–27)

- Part of the Fourth Era of Northern Domination and Ming–Việt War
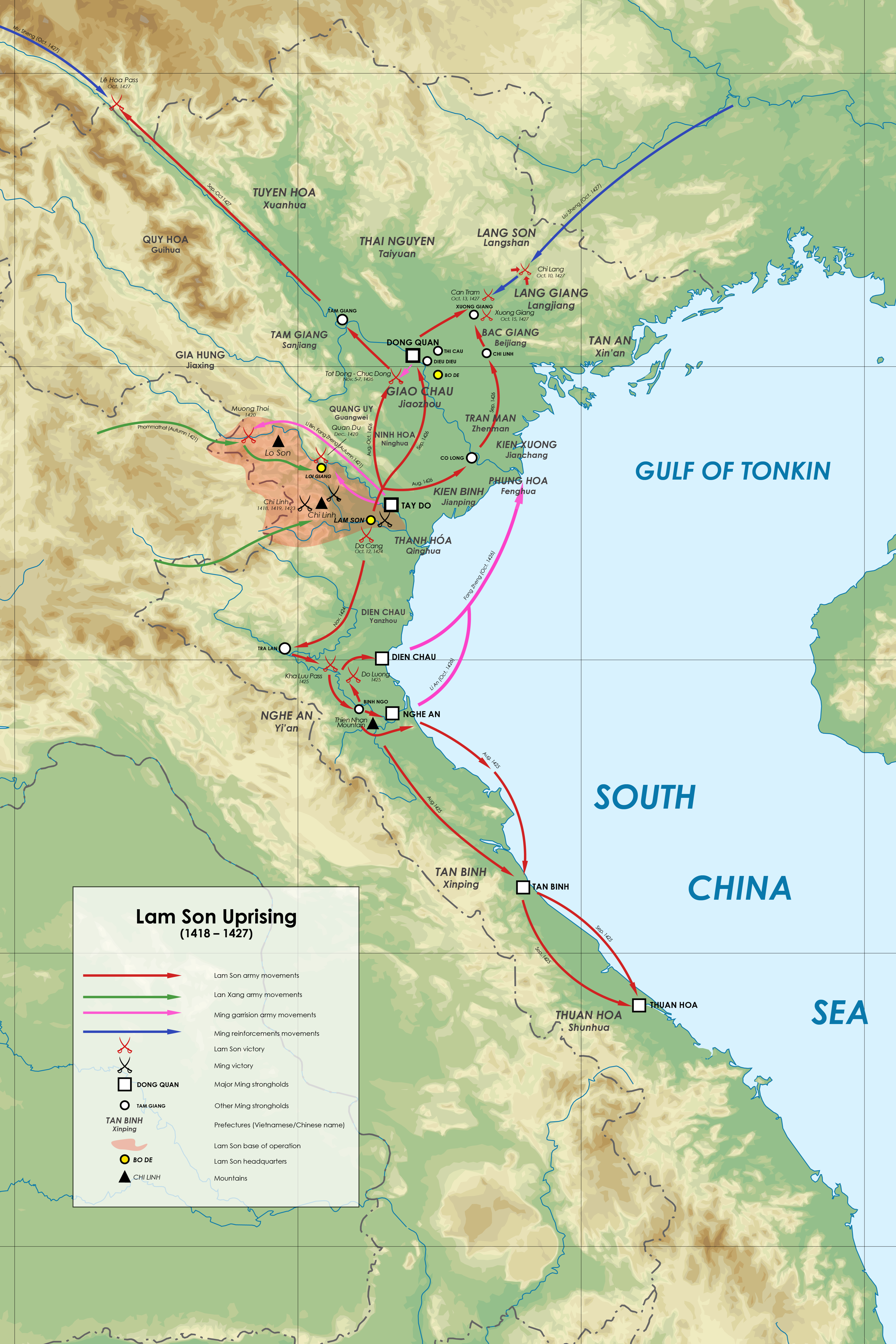
- Map showing the Lam Sơn uprising
Date	7 February 1418 – 10 December 1427 (9 years, 10 months and 3 days)
Location	Jiaozhi Province, Ming dynasty (present-day Northern and North Central Coast, Vietnam)
Result	Lam Sơn rebel victory: Đông Quan oath; Đại Việt regained independence, ending the Fourth Era of Northern Domination; Trần Cảo was granted the title King of Annam

Belligerents
Lam Sơn rebels; Lan Xang (1418–1421)	Ming dynasty; Lan Xang (from 1421)

Commanders and leaders
Lê Lợi; Lê Sát; Phạm Văn Xảo; Lê Ngân; Phạm Vấn; Đinh Lễ (executed); Lý Triện †; Lưu Nhân Chú; Nguyễn Chích; Nguyễn Xí; Trần Nguyên Hãn; Trịnh Khả; Lê Văn Linh; ... and many others	Li Bin #; Li An; Fang Zheng; Chen Zhi; Wang Tong; Liu Sheng †; Mu Sheng; Cui Ju (executed); Cai Fu; Lương Nhữ Hốt; Cầm Bành; Lan Kham Deng; Phommathat; ... and many others

The Lam Sơn uprising (Note: simplified Chinese: 蓝山起义; traditional Chinese: 藍山起義; Vietnamese: Khởi nghĩa Lam Sơn (IPA: [xɤ̂j ŋiə̂ˀ laːm ʂɤːn]); chữ Hán: 起義藍山, also known as simplified Chinese: 蓝山蜂起; traditional Chinese: 藍山蜂起; Vietnamese: Lam Sơn phong khởi (IPA: [laːm ʂɤːn fɔŋ xɤ̂j]); chữ Hán: 藍山蜂起) was a rebellion against Ming China led by Vietnamese leader Lê Lợi. The uprising began in early 1418 and ended in late 1427 with the victory of the Lam Sơn rebels, the retreat of the Ming army after the Đông Quan oath, and the establishment of the Later Lê dynasty.

In 1407, the Ming dynasty annexed the entire territory of Đại Ngu, the short-lived state ruled by the Hồ dynasty in what is now northern Vietnam and established the province of Jiaozhi. Their rule was met with resistance from the Viet people due to the Yongle Emperor's vigorous Sinicization policy, which aimed to assimilate the Viet. This policy caused widespread dissatisfaction and led to a series of uprisings across Jiaozhi, both large and small. After suppressing these uprisings, the Ming dynasty's rule became more stable than ever, but in some areas, there remained a latent risk of rebellion, particularly in the mountainous region of Thanh-Nghệ (modern Thanh Hóa and Nghệ An provinces), where the people were not willing to submit like those in the Kinh lộ region (the lowland Red River Delta).

In 1418, Lê Lợi raised an army in Lam Sơn, a rural mountainous area in today's Thanh Hóa province. In the early stages, the Lam Sơn rebels faced many difficulties, often only putting up weak resistance and suffering heavy losses against the Ming army's suppressing campaigns. The turning point occurred when Lê Lợi followed Nguyễn Chích's plan, advancing to liberate Nghệ An—a province in north-central Vietnam—in 1424 and using it as a base to strike out at other locations. After numerous clashes with the Ming army, the Lam Sơn rebels gained control of most of the territory from Thanh Hóa to Thuận Hóa (central Vietnam), tightening the siege on cities that had not yet surrendered. In 1426, with a strengthened army, Lê Lợi gradually mobilized his troops to the north. Utilizing the principle of "avoiding the strong and attacking the weak" and a strategy of mobility, the Lam Sơn army gradually forced the Ming troops to consolidate and defend important citadels. The decisive victory over the overwhelming Ming forces, led by Wang Tong, in the Tốt Động – Chúc Động campaign (near today's Hanoi), allowed the Lam Sơn rebels to gain the support of the majority of the Kinh lộ population, who had previously been intimidated by the might of the Ming. With strong support from the people, the Lam Sơn rebels shifted to the offensive, forcing the Ming troops to take refuge in their citadels and await reinforcements.

Taking advantage of the Ming army's low morale after consecutive defeats, Lê Lợi intensified enemy proselytizing and psychological warfare, using diplomatic measures to persuade besieged citadels to surrender. In a short period of time, most of the key citadels in northern Jiaozhi fell into the hands of the Lam Sơn rebels, either through surrender or siege. The Ming army only controlled two major strongholds, Đông Quan (the Ming administrative center in modern Hanoi) and Thanh Hóa, and a few smaller citadels, all of which were under strict siege and completely isolated. In 1427, in a final attempt to salvage the situation, the Xuande Emperor sent Liu Sheng and Mu Sheng with 110,000 troops divided into two routes to reinforce Wang Tong. However, the main force led by Liu Sheng was nearly completely annihilated by the Lam Sơn rebels in the Battle of Chi Lăng – Xương Giang, in present-day Lạng Sơn and Bắc Giang provinces. Liu Sheng himself, along with many other high-ranking generals, was killed in battle. Upon receiving the news, Mu Sheng hastily retreated but was also defeated by the rebels who pursued him.

The complete annihilation of the two relief armies marked the end of the Ming's efforts to regain control of Jiaozhi. Wang Tong was forced to surrender and allowed to withdraw his troops safely back to China, in accordance with the agreement made at the Đông Quan oath. After the victory, Lê Lợi ordered the scholar Nguyễn Trãi to write the Bình Ngô đại cáo, announcing the restoration of autonomy to the Viet people after two decades of Ming rule. Lê Lợi ascended to the throne, founding the Later Lê dynasty that lasted for nearly 400 years.

== Background ==
=== Ming invasion ===
Geopolitical situation in Southeast Asia in the early 15th century

In the late 14th century, Đại Việt—a kingdom located in what is now northern Vietnam and ruled by the Trần dynasty—faced a profound crisis on multiple fronts. In addition to external factors such as the prolonged war with Champa (a kingdom in present-day central and southern Vietnam), natural disasters, epidemics, and crop failures, the economic, social, and political structures of Đại Việt were severely weakened. Intense conflicts arose between the aristocracy and the lower classes, as well as between the aristocracy and the bureaucratic-intellectual class, as they vied for power within the government. This crisis resulted in peasant uprisings, serf and slave revolts, and even religious movements, which posed a serious threat to the legitimacy of the Trần dynasty and weakened the central government. In addition to these factors, the succession of incompetent emperors after Trần Minh Tông created favorable conditions for the ambitious reformer Lê Quý Ly, an imperial in-law, to gradually seize supreme power and control the court.

In 1400, Lê Quý Ly usurped the Trần dynasty and changed his surname to Hồ, establishing the Hồ dynasty and renaming the country "Đại Ngu". The following year, he abdicated the throne to his second son Hồ Hán Thương and became retired emperor, though he still held power over government affairs. Prior to usurping the Trần dynasty, Hồ Quý Ly had already implemented numerous radical reforms. These included replacing traditional copper coins with low-quality paper money, relocating the capital from Thăng Long (modern Hanoi) to Tây Đô citadel in Thanh Hóa, and making significant changes to the political and social systems. These reforms not only failed to address the class and internal conflicts that had arisen since the end of the Trần dynasty, but also infringed upon the interests of various classes, leading to dissatisfaction among the people.

On the Chinese side, the Hongwu Emperor, founder of the Ming dynasty, established a "Sinocentric order" based on the tributary system, which viewed Annam (the Chinese term for Đại Việt) and other neighboring states as falling under the category of "countries to not be invaded". (Note: The Hongwu Emperor designated 15 countries as buzheng zhiguo (不征之國; 'countries to not be invaded'), meaning territories the Chinese imperial court should not attempt to conquer. These included: Joseon, Japan, Great Ryukyu (modern Okinawa), Lesser Ryukyu (Taiwan), Annam (Đại Việt), Zhenla, Siam, Champa, Sumendala (Sumatra island), Xiyang (Coromandel Coast, India), Java, Pahang (Malay Peninsula), Battak (northwest Sumatra), Palembang (Indonesia), and Brunei. This policy reflected the Hongwu Emperor's goals of maintaining regional peace and promoting diplomatic relations with neighboring states.) He left behind instructions for his successors, advising against conquering distant lands as they brought no economic benefit to China. His son, the Yongle Emperor, who seized the throne from his nephew the Jianwen Emperor during the Jingnan campaign, had a different perspective. He demonstrated a desire for hegemony by launching territorial expansions, following the examples of the Han, Tang, and Yuan dynasties. For the Yongle Emperor, the invasion of Đại Việt was not only a means of territorial expansion, but also a step towards maritime dominance, as evidenced by Zheng He's voyages to the Western Ocean. He believed that annexing Annam would further consolidate China's prestige in Southeast Asia. Additionally, the Yongle Emperor faced opposition and doubts about his legitimacy after ascending to the throne. Launching a major military campaign may have been a way to divert domestic attention outward and assert his own capabilities.

The Yongle Emperor ascended the throne after overthrowing his nephew, and consequently faced considerable opposition. Launching a large military campaign in Annam can be seen as a way for him to divert domestic attention to external affairs.

After overthrowing the Trần dynasty, the relationship between the Hồ dynasty and the Ming dynasty became tense. This was mainly due to land disputes in the border regions and the war between Đại Ngu and Champa. The Ming court was concerned about this war as they considered the area to be within their sphere of influence and wanted to maintain their dominance in the region. Although the relationship between the two countries was somewhat eased after the border conflict was resolved and Hồ Hán Thương was conferred the title of "King of Annam" by the Ming, it was short-lived. In October 1404, a figure named Trần Thiêm Bình appeared in Nanjing, claiming to be the son of Trần Nghệ Tông and presenting the usurpation of the Hồ clan to the Yongle Emperor. Although there were doubts about Trần Thiêm Bình's true identity, under pressure from the Ming court, Hồ Quý Ly and his son were forced to compromise and agreed to bring him back to the country to be emperor. In January 1406, the Yongle Emperor ordered 5,000 troops to escort Thiêm Bình back to his country. They were ambushed by the Hồ forces, and Trần Thiêm Bình was captured and executed. This action escalated the tension between Đại Ngu and the Ming to an extreme level.

Enraged by the "treacherous" act, the Yongle Emperor made the decision to send additional troops to Annam in order to punish Hồ Quý Ly and his son. In November 1406, under the guise of "supporting the Trần and destroying the Hồ," two generals, Zhang Fu and Mu Sheng, led a force of 225,000 soldiers to attack Đại Ngu. With their overwhelming numbers, the Ming army easily broke through the Hồ's defensive lines, forcing Hồ Quý Ly to flee to Tây Đô. The Ming army utilized gunpowder and employed new tactics, previously used in the pacification campaign of Yunnan, to combat Hồ Quý Ly's war elephant forces. Furthermore, the loss of popular support and critical errors in military organization weakened the resistance of the Hồ dynasty, leading to their swift defeat. In June 1407, both Hồ Quý Ly and his son Hồ Hán Thương were captured alive by the Ming army, marking the end of the Hồ dynasty after only seven years of existence.

=== Ming rule ===
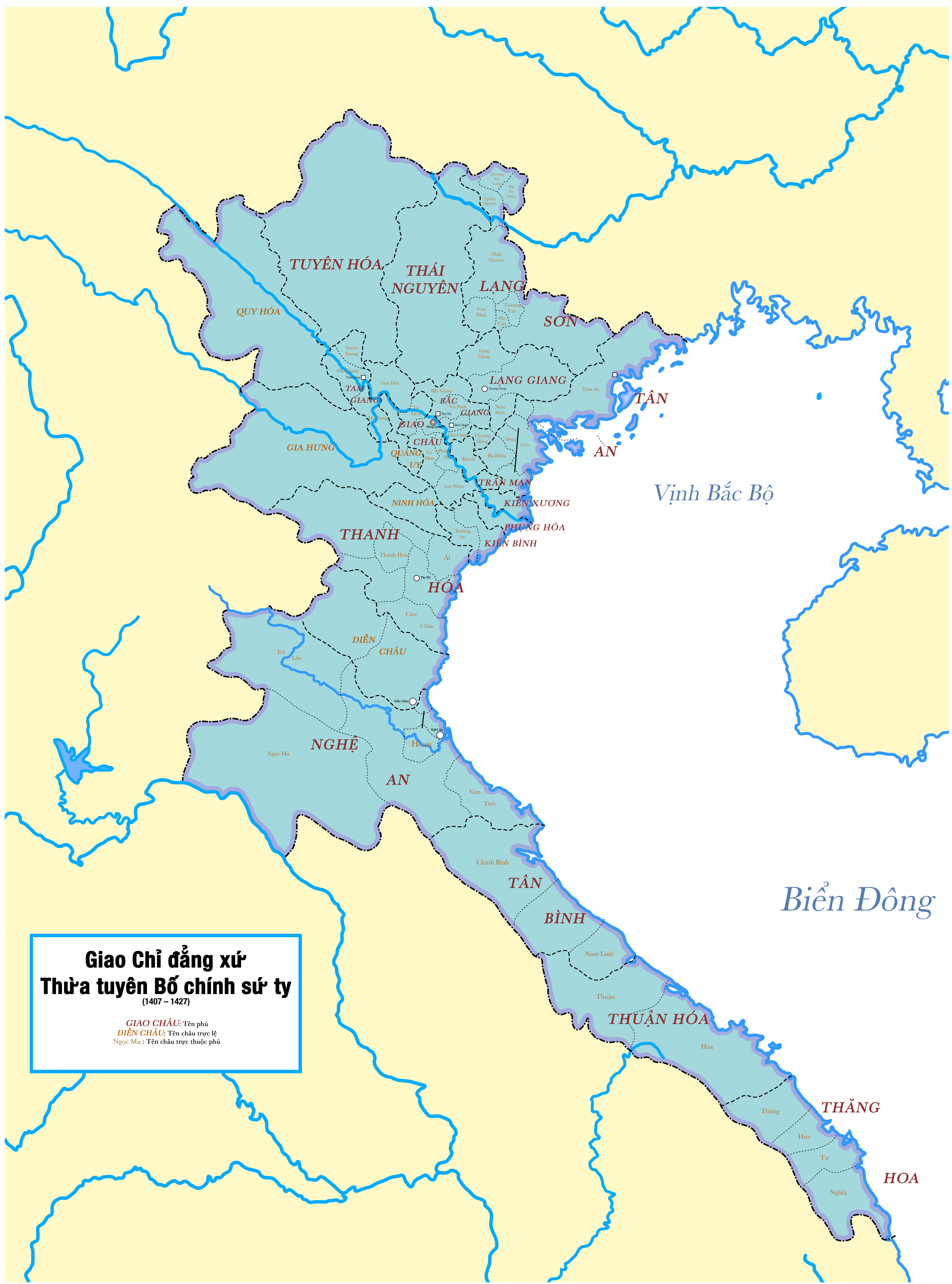
After the Ming dynasty annexed the former territory of Đại Ngu, Jiaozhi Province was organized following the model of the 13 existing provinces in China and was divided into 15 prefectures and 5 independent prefectures.

The Yongle Emperor, along with other influential figures in the court, such as Zhang Fu, advocated for the annexation of Annam into the Ming dynasty instead of restoring the throne to the Trần royal family. At the time, the Han people did not view Annam as a tributary state, but rather as a "historical territory" that had once belonged to China and needed to be reclaimed, as it had been during the Han and Tang dynasties. As a result, even before capturing Hồ Quý Ly and his son, the Ming court had already set its sights on incorporating Annam back into China. They took advantage of the fact that many Viet officials and elders actively requested to become imperial province of the Ming dynasty, as the Trần family had no heirs. This led to the annexation of the entire territory of the former Đại Ngu and the establishment of the Jiaozhi Province.

To stabilize their rule, the Ming dynasty implemented a divide and conquer policy, appointing Viet officials to govern the Viet people. Those who submitted were promised protection of their property and lives, as well as titles, land, and wealth. However, the Ming government went beyond political stabilization and also attempted to alter the local social and cultural structure. In an effort to assimilate, the Ming dynasty imposed Chinese cultural norms, such as changes in clothing, the construction of Confucian temples, and the adoption of Zhu Xi's Neo-Confucianism as the political and ethical standard. These measures aimed to replace the traditional Confucian ideology of the Vietnamese during the Trần dynasty. These policies caused significant divisions among the Viet classes, particularly within the intellectual class. Some scholar-officials, who may have been motivated by a sense of Viet solidarity or by personal loyalty to the Hồ or Trần dynasties, chose to retreat into seclusion, while the majority opted to serve the Ming dynasty in exchange for fame and power.

The elite in the Red River Delta and southern coastal regions (collectively known as the Kinh lộ people) (Note: Kinh lộ (京路): An old term used to refer to the area around Thăng Long, which was wealthy in talent and resources.) were more likely to support the Ming government, while those in the midland and mountainous areas (known as the Trại people) tended to oppose it. (Note: According to historian Momoki Shirō, terms like kinh lộ (京路) or kinh nhân (京人) began to appear in records during the Trần and early Lê dynasties. Although the character kinh (京) initially referred to things belonging to the "capital city" (kinh đô, or kinh kỳ), it later came to encompass the entire Red River Delta and its inhabitants. This stood in contrast to trại (寨), which referred to the Thanh-Nghệ region and its people. The Sino-Vietnamese term trại is probably equivalent to mường (a Tai-Kadai derived word).) According to historian Keith W. Taylor, this difference can be attributed to the level of Sinicization: the Kinh lộ people, heavily influenced by Chinese culture, saw cooperation with the Northern court as beneficial, while the Trại did not. Victor Lieberman also noted that the Trại maintained a free lifestyle and were less influenced by Chinese culture, but were known for their strong fighting spirit. Additionally, the scholar-officials in the Red River Delta did not accept Hồ Quý Ly's usurpation of the Trần dynasty's throne and his decision to move the capital from Thăng Long to Thanh Hóa. When the Ming army advanced, Hồ Quý Ly abandoned most of the Kinh lộ region instead of defending it, causing him to lose the loyalty of the people there.

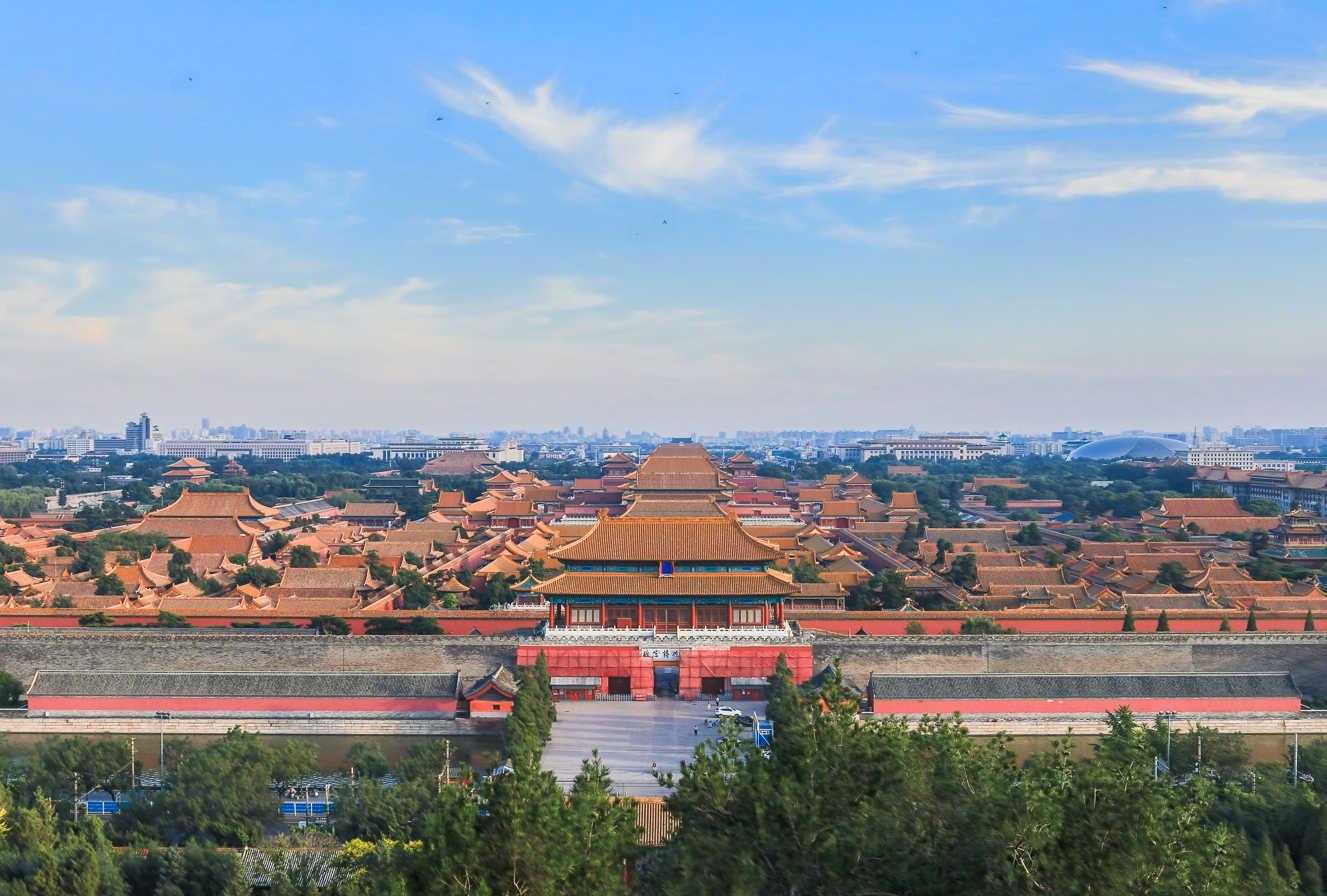
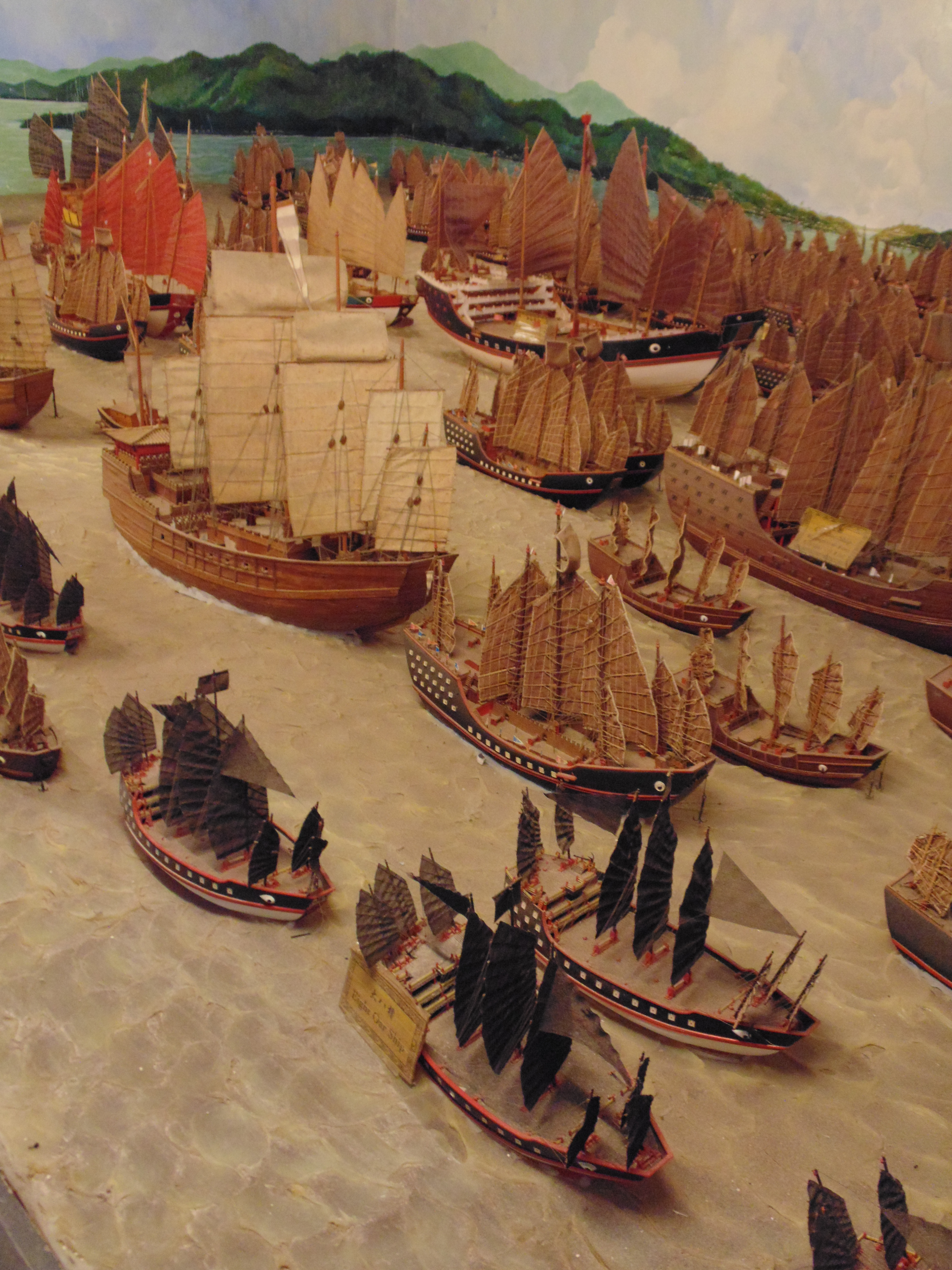
The construction of the Forbidden City in Beijing (top) and the expansion of Zheng He's maritime fleet (bottom) required a significant amount of high-quality timber from Jiaozhi. This is considered one of the main reasons that sparked a strong wave of uprisings there after 1417.

After taking power, the leading officials of Jiaozhi, particularly Huang Fu and his exceptional associates, worked diligently to establish an efficient governance system. They implemented various policies with the goal of stabilizing the situation and improving the lives of the people. These policies included measures such as taxation reforms, administrative improvements, and efforts to stabilize agricultural production. Despite these efforts, corruption within the local government and the haughty behavior of some Han officials, who saw themselves as symbols of civilized behavior, caused dissatisfaction among the populace. Nevertheless, according to Keith W. Taylor, there is no clear evidence that the Ming administration in Jiaozhi was more corrupt or oppressive than the indigenous Viet regimes that preceded or succeeded it. He argues that the local population's anti-Ming sentiment would have gradually faded over time, but such a scenario would have been possible only if the Ming had been genuinely determined to maintain their rule over Jiaozhi for a sufficiently long period.

The dissatisfaction among the people of Jiaozhi eventually reached a boiling point, resulting in numerous uprisings, both large and small. One of the most significant uprisings occurred in the autumn of 1407, led by the Later Trần emperors, the royal family, and former generals of the Trần dynasty. Despite facing initial challenges, the Later Trần army managed to achieve victories against the main forces of Mu Sheng at Bô Cô, located in present-day Nam Định province in the Red River Delta, in December 1408, gaining control over territory extending northward from Nghệ An, a province in north-central Vietnam, into the Red River Delta heartland. The internal affairs of the Later Trần army quickly fell into disarray, causing the rebel forces to lose their momentum and weaken under the strong attacks from the Ming army. This ultimately led to a complete defeat in 1414.

After the Later Trần dynasty was defeated, the security situation in Jiaozhi improved. There were still some areas that experienced resistance, but these uprisings were mostly fragmented, spontaneous, and local. They did not pose a significant threat to the Ming army and quickly dissipated. This period of stability did not last long. In 1417, another major wave of uprisings erupted in Jiaozhi, coinciding with the construction of the new capital in Beijing and the development of Zheng He's maritime fleet. According to American historian Edward Dreyer, the construction and shipbuilding required a large amount of manpower and resources, particularly high-quality wood, which was in short supply within China. In response, Ming officials, led by eunuch Ma Ji, increased taxes and intensified resource exploitation, causing dissatisfaction among the people and even the Viet officials. In February 1417, Li Bin was appointed to Jiaozhi to replace Zhang Fu, but the situation did not improve. By the end of that year, many Viet people, including former Ming officials, rose up against the colonial government.

== Outbreak and initial stages ==
=== Uprising in Lam Sơn (1416–1418) ===
Lê Lợi was originally a phụ đạo (Note: Phụ đạo was the designation for leaders of the highland regions (often the Trại people) in Vietnamese history. According to Ngô Sĩ Liên, this term was originally written as 輔導, but by the early Lê dynasty, it was changed to 父道.) in Lam Sơn, a position that had been passed down through generations. Lam Sơn is a commune located in the Lương Giang district of Thanh Hóa province. It is situated in a low mountainous area, with sparse forests and narrow fields. This area has a sparse population and is home to both Kinh and Trại people. Historical sources provide conflicting information about Lê Lợi's activities during the time when the Later Trần dynasty raised troops against the Ming. According to the Đại Việt sử ký toàn thư, a fifteenth-century official chronicle of Đại Việt compiled under the Lê dynasty, Lê Lợi saw that the Later Trần did not have the strength to succeed, so he did not join them. On the other hand, the Việt sử tiêu án, an eighteenth-century historical work by Ngô Thì Sĩ, suggests that Lê Lợi once served under Trùng Quang Đế and held the position of Kim Ngô General. (Note: The title Kim Ngô General, or Jinwu General (金吾將軍), was originally a largely ceremonial Ming-period office, granted to military officials of the regular second rank. During the Tang dynasty, however, Jinwu referred to an imperial guard unit responsible for maintaining public security and protecting the capital.) Despite these differences, all historical records agree that Lê Lợi had a strong desire to restore the nation, and he actively sought out talented individuals and gathered heroes and outstanding figures. When Huang Fu heard of Lê Lợi's reputation, he offered him an official title to recruit him, but Lê Lợi refused.

In early 1416, Lê Lợi and 18 others—though of different lineages and hometowns—gathered at Lũng Nhai in Lam Sơn to swear an oath to fight the Ming army and liberate the country. In the following period, more patriots joined Lê Lợi, forming a group known as the "Lũng Nhai Alliance". The majority of the members in this group were from the impoverished working class, including fishermen, farmers, salt workers, and servants. Additionally, there were also individuals from ethnic minorities such as the Mường, Thái, and Chiêm. At the time, recognizing the Ming's still-overwhelming military strength, Lê Lợi bribed several Ming officials and generals to secure temporary peace and buy time to strengthen his forces. By the end of 1417, Lê Lợi's army had grown to several thousand men.

Lương Nhữ Hốt, a Viet official serving the Ming dynasty, became aware of Lê Lợi's ambitions and reported them to his superiors. In response, the Ming deployed spies to monitor Lê Lợi's army and prepared a preemptive strike. Facing this threat, on 7 February 1418, Lê Lợi proclaimed himself Bình Định vương (Prince of Pacification) and, together with his entire forces, raised the banner of revolt at Lam Sơn. He appointed his nephew Lê Thạch as chancellor and issued proclamations across the region, urging the people to rise against Ming rule.

=== Operations in the mountainous region of Thanh Hóa (1418) ===
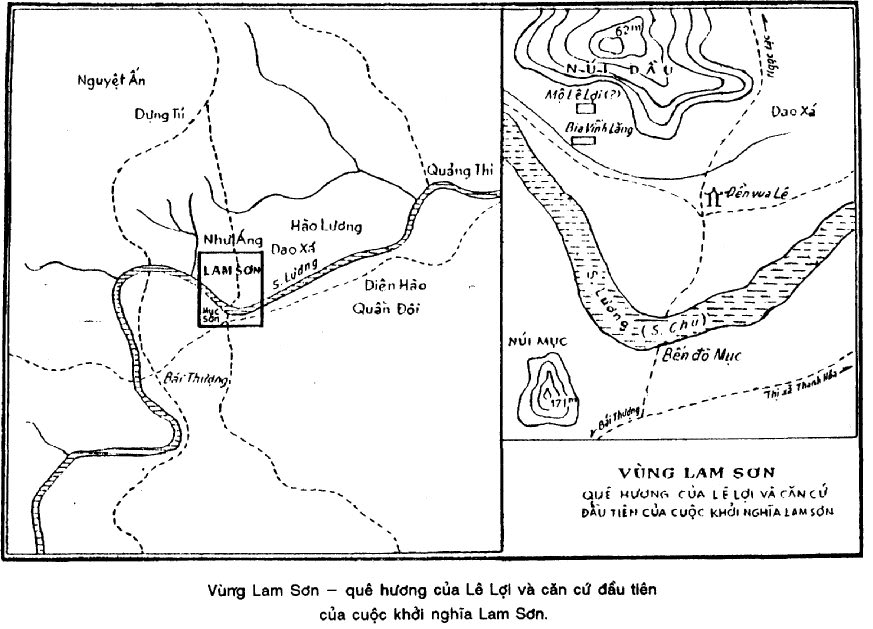
Map of the Lam Sơn region, the first base of Lê Lợi

The location of Lam Sơn posed challenges for the organization and growth of the rebel army. It was situated just 20 km southwest of Tây Đô Citadel, one of the two largest citadels in Jiaozhi (the other being Đông Quan, the Ming administrative center in modern Hanoi). The Ming dynasty, after conquering the Hồ dynasty and suppressing rebellions from Thanh Hóa to the south, established Tây Đô Citadel as their main military base in the region. This gave them control over a vast area stretching from Thanh Hóa to Thuận Hóa. Due to its close proximity to this key Ming stronghold, Lam Sơn was constantly under threat of attack from the garrisoned forces. As a result, in the early stages of the uprising, Lam Sơn was a localized force and was unable to offer much resistance against the Ming army's sweeping campaigns.

On 13 February 1418, after analysis of the situation, Lê Lợi made the decision to withdraw from the Lam Sơn base and establish a camp in Lạc Thủy, (Note: Lạc Thủy: The upper reaches of the Chu River, now located in Cẩm Thủy district, Thanh Hóa province.) a location on the route to Lan Xang (present-day Laos). He also sent trusted individuals to negotiate with Lan Xang, requesting food, weapons, and elephants. The following day, Ming general Ma Qi led troops from Tây Đô to pursue the rebels. In anticipation of this, Lê Lợi set up an ambush at Lạc Thủy. When Ma Qi's army arrived on 18 February, Lê Lợi ordered the ambush troops to attack, successfully holding back the Ming forces. Despite this initial victory, the Lam Sơn rebels were ultimately forced to retreat towards Chí Linh Mountain (located between present-day Thường Xuân and Lang Chánh districts, Thanh Hóa province) due to the overwhelming enemy forces.

According to the Lam Sơn thực lục, a chronicle of the Lam Sơn uprising compiled by order of Lê Lợi following the establishment of the Lê dynasty, after their defeat at Lạc Thủy, Ma Qi sought revenge and attempted to lure Lê Lợi into submission by ordering a man named Ái, a phụ đạo in Nguyệt Ấn (an upland locality in present-day Ngọc Lặc district, Thanh Hóa), to lead a group of people to desecrate Lê Lợi's family grave in Phật Hoàng. The Ming army hung the remains of Lê Lợi's father at the bow of one of their ships in an attempt to force him to surrender, but their efforts were unsuccessful. (Note: Historian Yamamoto Tatsurō raises questions about an event not mentioned in the Đại Việt sử ký toàn thư. He argues that the story in the Lam Sơn thực lục about Ming troops exhuming the graves of Lê Lợi's ancestors carries a mythical overtone. This, he suggests, reflects Vietnamese beliefs in feng shui and the concept that "the graves of ancestors influence the destiny of their descendants.) Later, the Ming army launched a frontal attack on the rebels while a detachment led by phụ đạo Ái took a shortcut to ambush the Lam Sơn troops. The rebels, caught in a pincer attack, were unable to put up a strong resistance and were quickly defeated. Lê Lợi's wife and children, as well as the relatives of other generals and soldiers, were captured. In the face of this dire situation, some of the rebels lost morale and deserted, leaving only a few to follow Lê Lợi to Chí Linh to hide. Surrounded by the Ming army and facing a shortage of food, the rebels were forced to hold their ground on Chí Linh Mountain for over two months. It was only when the Ming army retreated at the end of March that Lê Lợi was able to return and gather the remaining 100 or so men of his forces.

The Lam Sơn rebels had more than half a year to consolidate their forces and build fortifications in Lam Sơn. This was because the Ming army, at that time, had to be dispersed to deal with other uprisings, the most notable being the uprising of Xa Khả Tham in the northwest region. After suppressing these other uprisings, the Ming general Li Bin sent troops from Đông Quan to attack Lam Sơn. Lê Lợi realized that Lam Sơn was not a favorable position for defense, and he ordered his troops to withdraw to Mường Một (now located in Thường Xuân district, Thanh Hóa). In Mường Một, Lê Lợi successfully ambushed a part of the Ming army, forcing the remnants to retreat to the Nga Lạc garrison (a Ming garrison in the western uplands of present-day Thanh Hóa, in what is now Lang Chánh district). After a 6-month siege, the Lam Sơn rebels were finally able to capture Nga Lạc in May 1419. Despite this victory, Lê Lợi still had concerns about potential retaliation from the Ming. As a precaution, he secretly retreated to Chí Linh Mountain.

In May 1419, the Ming army besieged Chí Linh Mountain, cutting off all vital routes. In this dire situation, a loyal subordinate named Lê Lai volunteered to impersonate Lê Lợi and lead the troops outside to deceive the Ming army. By capturing Lê Lai, the Ming army believed they had captured the Lam Sơn commander and relaxed their guard, allowing Lê Lợi and his remaining troops to escape. After the Ming army withdrew, Lê Lợi returned to Lam Sơn to rebuild his forces. Upon hearing that the Lam Sơn rebels were not only refusing to disband but were also consolidating their forces, Li Bin immediately dispatched troops to suppress them. However, he fell into an ambush in Mường Chính (in present-day Lang Chánh district, Thanh Hóa, encompassing the communes of Tân Phúc, Tân Văn, Đồng Lương, and Quang Hiếu) and was forced to retreat to Khả Lam (in present-day Nam Đàn district, Nghệ An province). Following the victory at Mường Chính, Lê Lợi received news that the Lan Xang court was ready to support the fight against the Ming dynasty. He then brought all his forces to Mường Thôi to operate and facilitate contact with the Laotians.

=== Expanding influence (1419–1421) ===
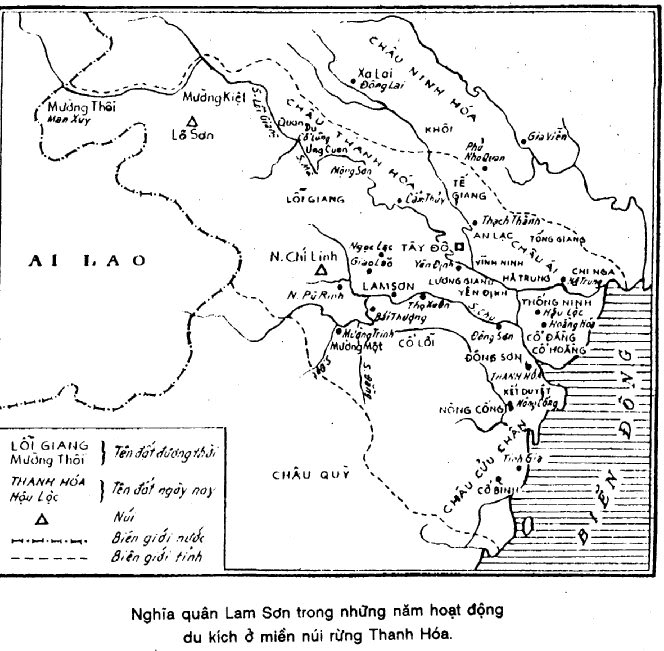
Map of the operational areas of the Lam Sơn rebels from 1418 to 1423

In September 1419, with the support of Lan Xang, the rebels advanced to operate in the Lỗi Giang region (Note: Lỗi Giang: Comprising the districts of Bá Thước, Cẩm Thuỷ, and part of Quan Hóa district in present-day Thanh Hóa province.) and stationed at Ba Lãm. (Note: Ba Lãm: Present-day location is Điền Lư commune, Bá Thước district, Thanh Hóa province.) During this time, a series of armed uprisings erupted across the territory of Jiaozhi, including the uprisings of the Red Coat forces in the northwest region, Phạm Ngọc in the Northeast, Phan Liêu in Nghệ An, and Lộ Văn Luật in Thạch Thất. Some of these uprisings posed a larger scale and more direct threat than the Lam Sơn army, prompting Li Bin to temporarily leave Nghệ An and return to Đông Quan to quell the disturbances. Lê Lợi took advantage of this opportunity to eliminate opposing local leaders in the region and expand the operational area to neighboring regions. After the Ming successfully suppressed the major uprisings in Jiaozhi, the Lam Sơn movement emerged as the greatest threat to Ming rule. As a result, Li Bin planned to launch a new offensive into Thanh Hóa at the end of 1420 to eliminate the Lam Sơn rebels.

In November 1420, Li Bin and Fang Zheng led troops from Tây Đô to attack the mountainous region of Thanh Hóa. After a year of building their forces, the rebels achieved repeated victories against the Ming army at Mường Thôi, Bồ Mộng, and Bồ Thi Lang, (Note: Mường Thôi: Located in the northwest of Thanh Hóa province, along the Vietnam-Laos border; Bồ Mộng, Bồ Thi Lang: Location unclear, known to be near the rebel army's base during that period.) forcing Li Bin and Fang Zheng to retreat to Tây Đô. In December 1420, taking advantage of their success, Lê Lợi led the entire army to Lỗi Giang, where they set up camp at Ba Lãm and sent Lê Sát to attack the Quan Du garrison. This victory further solidified the Lam Sơn rebels' reputation, attracting many talented individuals from other regions, including Nguyễn Trãi, to join their ranks. During this time, the Lan Xang kingdom had chosen to support Lộ Văn Luật, who was then seeking refuge in their court, and consequently decided to sever ties with the Lam Sơn rebels.

In the summer and autumn of 1421, severe floods devastated the Red River Delta region, causing significant economic and social damage. This forced the Ming army to temporarily suspend all military plans. Due to his prolonged inability to defeat Lê Lợi, Li Bin sought support from Lan Xang, reporting to Beijing that Lê Lợi had fled to Laos to both avoid reprimand and exert pressure on Lan Xang. After addressing the natural disaster's aftermath and successfully compelling Lan Xang to switch sides, Li Bin appointed Chen Zhi to lead troops into the northwest region of Thanh Hóa to quell the rebellion. The Lam Sơn rebels organized a nighttime raid on the Ming camp at Kình Lộng Pass, (Note: Kình Lộng Pass: Later known as Cỗ Lũng Pass, presently located in Cẩm Thủy district, Thanh Hóa province.) attempting a surprise attack, but their assault failed to halt the strong Ming offensive. Taking advantage of their overwhelming numbers, Chen Zhi immediately attacked Ống Pass but fell into an ambush set by the rebels and was forced to retreat. After the Ming troops withdrew, Lan Xang prince Phommathat brought 30,000 troops to the border. Mistakenly believing they had come to help, the Lam Sơn rebels relaxed their defenses and were ambushed. Despite being caught off guard in the middle of the night, the rebels fought back and successfully repelled the Lan Xang army.

=== Temporary truce (1422–1424) ===
After a series of defeats, the Ming army found themselves in a passive position. In March 1422, Li Bin fell ill and died, and was replaced by Chen Zhi. Due to numerous internal issues that needed to be resolved, the Ming army did not engage in any significant encounters with the Lam Sơn rebels throughout the latter half of 1422. It was not until February 1423 that the Ming army coordinated with Lan Xang to attack the Lam Sơn rebels, forcing Lê Lợi to retreat from Lỗi Giang to the Khôi district. Although they successfully held off the Ming-Lan Xang alliance, the rebels also suffered heavy losses. Furthermore, as Khôi district and Lỗi Giang were no longer suitable for a military base, Lê Lợi was forced to retreat to Chí Linh Mountain for the third time to rebuild his forces. After more than two months in Chí Linh, the rebels found themselves in a dire situation, having to survive on bamboo shoots and vegetables. Lê Lợi was even forced to kill elephants and war horses to feed his troops. In such a perilous situation, the morale of the troops wavered, and some even deserted. It was only when Lê Lợi executed a fleeing general that the military situation temporarily stabilized. In this context, Lê Lợi advocated for a truce with the Ming army, using the time to turn the situation around.

In May 1423, Lê Lợi initiated a strategy of reconciliation by sending envoys to negotiate with the Ming army. The envoys brought offerings, including 5 pairs of elephant tusks and a letter of surrender. The Ming army, preoccupied with the threat of emerging Mongol tribes at their northern border, quickly accepted Lê Lợi's proposal and the two sides began exchanging gifts. Lê Lợi gifted gold and silver to Ming commanders such as Chen Zhi and Shan Shou, who in turn brought fish, salt, rice seeds, and farming tools to gift to the rebela. During this time, the rebels secretly trained soldiers, manufactured weapons, and prepared food. When the Ming discovered these activities, Lê Lợi attempted to appease them by sending another envoy with gifts, but the envoy was immediately arrested by Chen Zhi and Shan Shou, leading Lê Lợi to suspend the peace negotiations.

== Turning point of the war (1424–1426) ==
=== Changes in the Ming dynasty's policies toward Annam ===
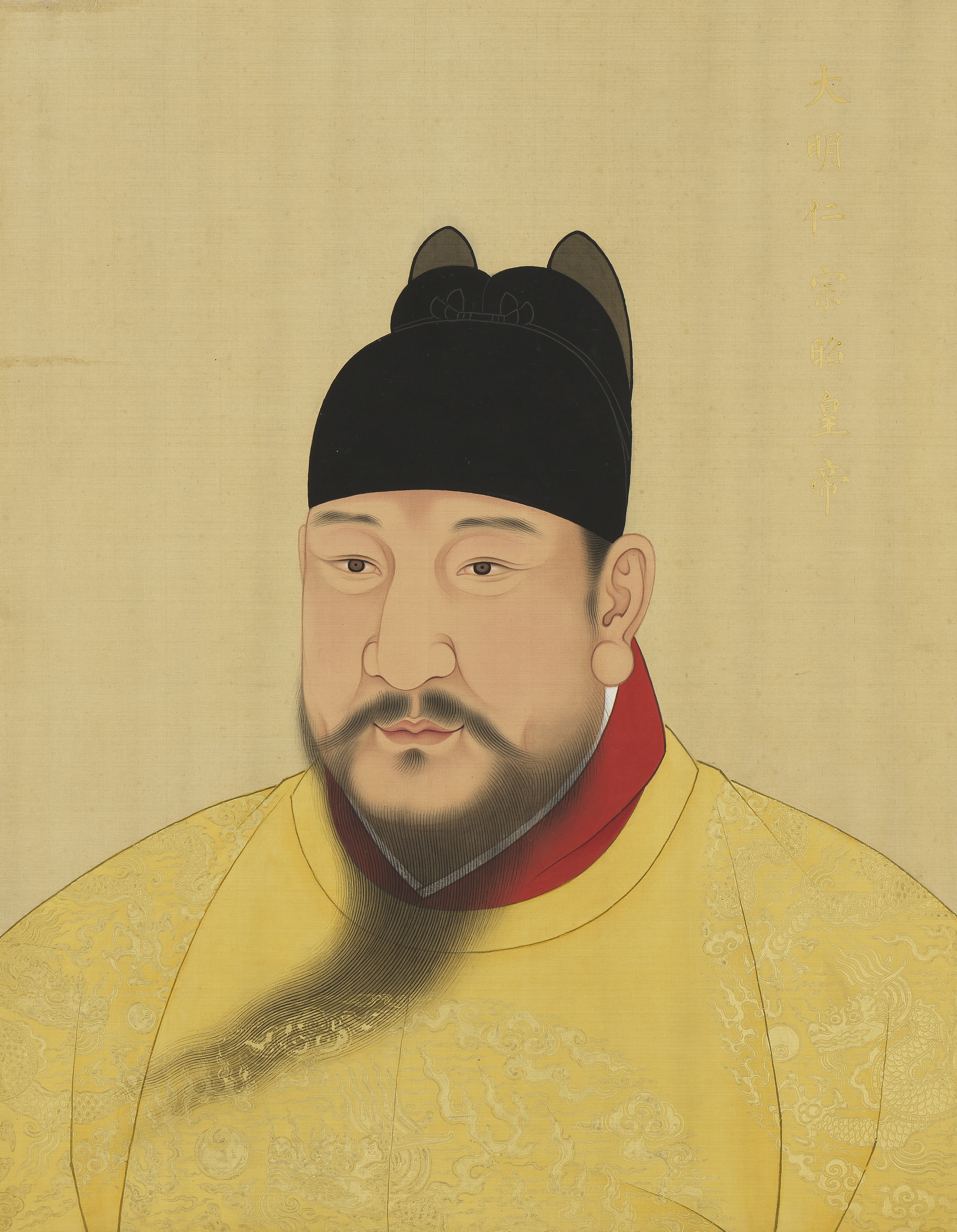
The Hongxi Emperor, unlike his father, pursued a flexible policy to address the situation in Jiaozhi.

On 12 August 1424, the Yongle Emperor died and was succeeded by his eldest son, the Hongxi Emperor. His death was regarded as a pivotal event, leading to a "complete reversal" in the Ming dynasty's policy toward Annam. During his reign, the Yongle Emperor was determined to incorporate Annam as a Chinese province (similar to other inland regions), and thus implemented harsh measures to suppress and control the local population. Any uprisings or rebellions were swiftly crushed by military force. After the Hongxi Emperor ascended the throne, he realized the challenges of maintaining complete control over Annam, especially as the Ming dynasty faced financial strain and encountered growing resistance from the locals. In order to alleviate the burden on the imperial court, the Hongxi Emperor introduced policies of amnesty, abolished certain tribute obligations, and reduced taxes in Jiaozhi.

The Hongxi Emperor, known for his emphasis on civil governance, made significant changes to the militaristic policies of his father's reign upon ascending the throne. These changes, however, inadvertently created opportunities for rebel movements to thrive. In August 1424, he recalled Minister of Works Huang Fu to Beijing and appointed Minister of War Chen Qia to oversee the Provincial Administration and Surveillance Commissions in Jiaozhi. Some historians argue that dismissing an experienced and respected official like Huang Fu was a grave mistake, as his successor struggled to effectively fulfill his role due to supply shortages and a lack of understanding of local conditions. Additionally, the Ming dynasty was embroiled in a prolonged war with the Northern Yuan, further complicating the situation. In light of these challenges, the Hongxi Emperor adopted a flexible approach to resolving the issues in Jiaozhi. For example, when Chen Zhi submitted a memorial detailing Lê Lợi's "deceptive" actions, the Hongxi Emperor ordered his generals to "skillfully pacify and persuade" rather than escalate hostilities.

=== Lam Sơn southward advance ===
The Chí Linh – Lam Sơn base was in a vulnerable position, susceptible to being surrounded by Ming forces from Đông Quan and Tây Đô. In response to the Ming's troop deployment, Lê Lợi and his generals decided to adopt a strategic approach of "avoiding strongholds to strike weak points, bypassing fortified positions to attack vulnerable ones, and evading concentrated forces to exploit gaps in their defense". This decision was made at a crucial council meeting in late 1424, where Lê Lợi approved Nguyễn Chích's proposal to march on Nghệ An. This pivotal decision completely transformed the course of the war. According to Nguyễn Chích's analysis, the southern region of Thanh Hóa Prefecture, stretching from Diễn Châu to Thuận Hóa, was only lightly garrisoned by Ming troops. This was due to the fact that these areas were far from the main strongholds in Dông Quan and Tây Đô. Additionally, Nguyễn Chích, who had operated in Nghệ An for years, pointed out that the region's vast territory and dense population made it an ideal rear base that could serve as a springboard for further offensives.

On 12 October 1424, the Lam Sơn rebels launched a surprise attack on the Đa Căng garrison, (Note: Đa Căng garrison: Located in Thọ Xuân district, Thanh Hóa province today.) catching the soldiers stationed there off guard and quickly annihilating them. The nearby Ming army, upon receiving the distress signal, rushed to the rescue but was also defeated outside Đa Căng. This victory not only boosted the morale of the rebels, but also garnered enthusiastic support from the local population, resulting in a significant increase in the number of people joining their cause. In response, the Ming generals in Thanh Hóa, Chen Zhi, Fang Zheng, and Cai Fu ordered troops from Nghệ An, Trà Lân, and Quỳ Châu to coordinate and launch a pincer attack on the rebels. Lê Lợi was aware of the Ming's plan and decided to intercept each of their armies one by one. He first carried out an ambush at Bồ Đằng (in present-day Châu Nga commune, Quỳ Châu district, Nghệ An), successfully holding back the forces of Chen Zhi and Fang Zheng. The very next day, the Lam Sơn rebels launched a surprise attack on Trịnh Sơn village (Note: Trịnh Sơn village (鄭山莊; 'the Trịnh family's mountain estate'): Also known as Kẻ Trịnh, located in Thạch Ngàn commune, Con Cuông district, present-day Nghệ An province, approximately 10 km from Trà Lân citadel.) in Trà Lân Prefecture, effectively breaking the Ming army's pincer movement. The forces of Chen Zhi and Fang Zheng pursued the rebels, but when they realized their plan had failed, they retreated to fortify themselves in Nghệ An via the Quỳ Châu route through Diễn Châu.

==== Siege of Trà Lân Citadel ====
In December 1424, the Lam Sơn rebels approached Trà Lân citadel, (Note: Although Trà Lân Citadel was a mountain fortress, its perimeter was comparable to that of Hanoi Citadel during the Nguyễn dynasty. The walls of some sections were built to heights reaching up to 15 meters.) a solid stronghold located in an ethnic minority area and guarded by Viet general Cầm Bành. Lê Lợi attempted to persuade Cầm Bành to surrender, but was met with refusal. Realizing that the enemy was waiting for reinforcements, Lê Lợi laid siege to the fortress and also captured surrounding areas belonging to Trà Lân Prefecture. He implemented policies to win over the local population. While the Ming generals in Nghệ An were debating whether to send troops to relieve the siege, Shan Shou returned to Jiaozhi from Beijing. During his time at court, Shan Shou assured the Hongxi Emperor that Lê Lợi could be persuaded to surrender. The Emperor agreed and ordered Shan Shou to bring an edict appointing Lê Lợi as the prefect of Thanh Hóa. As a result, Shan Shou advocated for using diplomatic measures instead of sending troops to rescue Trà Lân citadel. This strategy was supported by generals like Chen Zhi.

The Trà Lân citadel had been under siege for over a month. In order to quickly relieve Cầm Bành, Shan Shou sent a letter urging surrender and released prisoners of war. Lê Lợi, using a clever strategy, pretended to accept the imperial edict while also demanding that Shan Shou order Cầm Bành to cease fighting before negotiations could proceed. Shan Shou agreed and ordered the officials and soldiers in Trà Lân city to cease fighting. On the side of Cầm Bành, facing a dire situation after being besieged for months without reinforcements, he reluctantly opened the gates and surrendered to the Lam Sơn rebels. Upon entering Trà Lân, Lê Lợi worked to pacify and pardon the people inside. The capture of Trà Lân citadel boosted the prestige of the rebel army. Anti-Ming leaders such as Phan Liêu and Lộ Văn Luật, who had sought refuge in Lan Xang, gradually returned to join the Lam Sơn rebels. Additionally, many Lao chieftains in the border areas declared their support for the rebels in various ways.

After witnessing the Lam Sơn rebels take control of Trà Lân citadel and subdue Cầm Bành, the Ming generals in Nghệ An realized that their plan to lure Lê Lợi had failed, but they remained determined to continue this strategy. Lê Lợi used the excuse of a personal feud with Lương Nhữ Hốt, who was still in Thanh Hóa at the time, to request a reassignment as prefect of Trà Lân. Shan Shou and Chen Zhi knew that diplomatic measures would not work with Lê Lợi, but they were hesitant to disobey the Emperor's orders. They were also unsure of victory if they mobilized their troops. Minister of War Chen Qia, recognizing the serious threat posed by the Lam Sơn army, secretly reported to Beijing that "Lợi, although surrendering, is still rebelling [...] requesting an immediate order for extermination". Upon receiving this report, the Ming court immediately ordered the generals to suppress the rebellion. Shan Shou and Chen Zhi were instructed to cut off communication with Lê Lợi and prepare for a counterattack on Trà Lân.

==== Advancing along the Lam River ====
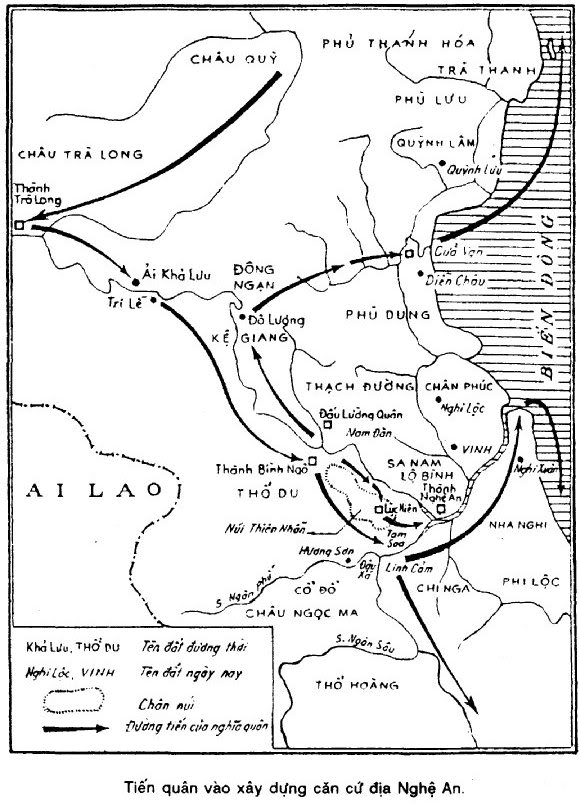
The Lam Sơn rebels advanced into Nghệ An

From Nghệ An city to Trà Lân, there are two routes: the first route follows the Lam River, and the second route was thượng đạo path (Note: Thượng đạo (上道), literally meaning "upper road" or "upper path," refers to mountain trails or overland routes traversing forests and crossing mountain passes.) passing through Đỗ Gia. To prevent the possibility of being attacked from both sides if the Ming army splits into two routes, Lê Lợi sent Đinh Liệt with over 1,000 troops to garrison at Đỗ Gia, (Note: Đỗ Gia: Located in present-day Hương Sơn district, Hà Tĩnh province.) specifically the Linh Cảm mountain area at the confluence of the Ngàn Phố and Ngàn Sâu rivers. This strategic placement allowed for control of the main route from Thanh Hóa to Thuận Hóa. By stationing troops here, the Lam Sơn army was able to block the Ming troops from taking the thượng đạo route from Nghệ An to Trà Lân, while also cutting off reinforcements from Tân Bình and Thuận Hóa. After Đinh Liệt deployment, Lê Lợi led the Lam Sơn army from Trà Lân to establish a camp at the Khả Lưu pass (Note: Khả Lưu: The name of a pass located north of the Lam River, now in Vĩnh Sơn commune, Anh Sơn district, Nghệ An province.) on the left bank of the Lam River.

Due to Đinh Liệt's occupation of the thượng đạo road, Chen Zhi and Fang Zheng mobilized their main forces, both naval and land, along the Lam River to advance to Khả Lưu and set up camp on the southern bank of the river, opposite the Lam Sơn army. With their overwhelming forces, the Ming army planned to attack the next day. The Lam Son army pretended to remain inactive while secretly sending a small force across the river to set up an ambush. The following morning, the Ming army launched their attack, falling into the trap set by the Lam Sơn army. The Ming army suffered a major defeat and was forced to retreat to the southern bank of the Lam River, where they fortified themselves to prevent the Lam Son army from advancing to Nghệ An. Due to limited supplies, Lê Lợi ordered the camp to be burned and pretended to retreat to Trà Lân, in an attempt to lure the Ming troops away from their position. The rebels then took a shortcut to set up an ambush at Bồ Ải. (Note: Bồ Ải: A location adjacent to Khả Lưu pass, now in Đức Sơn commune, Anh Sơn district, Nghệ An province.) The Ming army, believing that the rebels had retreated due to running out of supplies, pursued them and camped at the old Lam Sơn's camp in Khả Lưu, planning a long-term defense. The next day, Lê Lợi sent troops to provoke the Ming army, luring them into another trap. The Ming army was ambushed and defeated by the Lam Sơn rebels from all sides, resulting in the death or capture of many generals. Chen Zhi, suffering heavy losses, was forced to retreat with the remnants of his army to Nghệ An citadel to hold their position.

==== Siege of Nghệ An Citadel ====
After Chen Zhi withdrew his troops from the Khả Lưu and Bồ Ải battlefields and returned to the Nghệ An citadel, he decided to hold his ground and avoid further engagement. Drawing on the experience gained from the Trà Lân citadel campaign, Lê Lợi implemented a dual strategy: while besieging the citadel, he also dispatched forces to attack scattered enemy outposts across Nghệ An Prefecture. His objective was to expand his rear base, isolate Chen Zhi's forces, and prevent reinforcements from arriving from other regions. On Thiên Nhẫn Mountain, which was located opposite Nghệ An citadel, Lê Lợi had fortifications and barracks built as a new military base. From the top of the mountain, the rebels could observe and capture every move of the Ming troops inside the citadel. Additionally, the Lam Sơn rebels successfully captured all 20 districts of the Nghệ An Prefecture, effectively gaining control of an area equivalent to present-day Hà Tĩnh province and southern Nghệ An. As Lê Lợi's power continued to grow, many chieftains in the mountainous regions of western Nghệ An and local officials began to submit and join the rebel forces.

On 2 May 1425, in response to the unfavorable developments in Nghệ An, the commander of Đông Quan, Li An, brought a naval battalion by sea to provide reinforcements. On 14 May, when the reinforcements arrived, Chen Zhi brought all the troops from the citadel outside to coordinate an attack on the Lam Sơn army. Their plan was to move upstream on the La River and attack the base at Đỗ Gia, using it as a foothold to strike the main camp of the rebels on Thiên Nhẫn Mountain. However, as they approached the mouth of the Khuất River, the Ming army fell into an unexpected ambush set by the rebels and was defeated. This forced them to retreat to Nghệ An. In response, Chen Zhi decided to leave Fang Zheng and Li An to hold the citadel, while he retreated by sea to Đông Quan to consolidate his forces and prepare for a new counterattack. Lệ Lợi then ordered Nguyễn Trãi to write a provocative letter, but Fang Zheng remained determined to hold the position and did not engage in battle.

==== Lam Sơn control over the south ====
After gaining control of southern Nghệ An, the Lam Sơn generals decided to advance into the Diễn Châu and Thanh Hóa regions. As most of their soldiers had been drawn into Nghệ An by Chen Zhi and Fang Zheng earlier, the Ming forces in Tây Đô were significantly weaker at that time. In June 1425, Đinh Lễ was given the task of leading troops to persuade the rural areas in northern Nghệ An and Thanh Hóa. Upon completing this mission, he had the Động Đình fortress built about 10 km from Diễn Châu in preparation for a siege. The general in charge of defending Diễn Châu, Cui Ju, upon hearing this news, closed the gates and prepared for siege. In order to help Diễn Châu withstand a long siege, Chen Zhi sent people to bring in supplies. Đinh Lễ was aware that the troops inside the citadel would have to leave to fetch these supplies, so he set up an ambush and successfully captured many of the enemy's ships and provisions. This caused the Ming army to scatter, with some fleeing to Tây Đô and the rest retreating to Diễn Châu to continue their defense.

After achieving victory, Đinh Lễ left a portion of his soldiers to besiege Diễn Châu, while he led the main army to pursue the Ming troops out of Tây Đô. Upon hearing the news of the victory in Diễn Châu, Lê Lợi immediately sent Lý Triện, Lê Sát, Lưu Nhân Chú, and Bùi Bị to lead 2,000 troops and 2 elephants to Thanh Hóa to support Đinh Lễ. The Ming troops in Tây Đô were taken by surprise and could not resist, forcing them to close the gates and fortify themselves. The rebel forces did not intend to besiege the citadel, instead leaving a small contingent in front of the citadel while the rest were divided to pacify the districts and counties. With strong support from the people, the Lam Sơn army quickly gained control of the entire Thanh Hóa Prefecture. The Ming power in the rural areas completely collapsed, leaving them with only control over the isolated Tây Đô citadel and no means of communication with Đông Quan or other strongholds.

In July 1425, just one year after the death of the Yongle Emperor, the Lam Sơn rebels gained control of the three prefectures of Thanh Hóa, Diễn Châu, and Nghệ An. This loss of territory left the already thinly spread Ming troops in Tân Bình and Thuận Hóa isolated and cut off from other strongholds. In August 1425, the Lam Sơn rebels divided into two groups: The first, led by Trần Nguyên Hãn with 1,000 troops and a war elephant, advanced south via the thượng đạo road. The second, commanded by Lê Ngân, consisted of 70 warships advancing via the sea route. Trần Nguyên Hãn arrived at the Gianh River and encountered the Ming army led by Ren Neng. The Lam Sơn rebels continued to use guerrilla tactics, successfully defeating this Ming army unit.

== Lam Sơn advanced northward (1426) ==
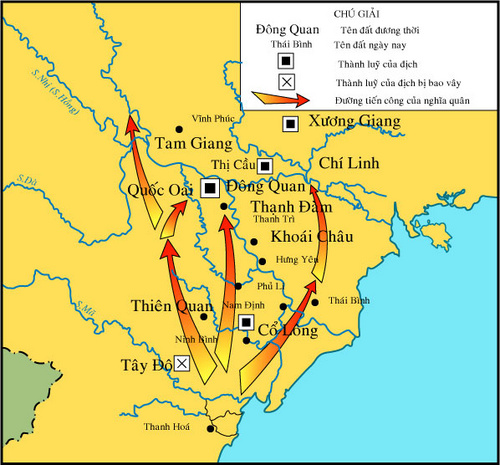
The directions of the Lam Sơn army's northward advance

In just ten months since the strategic shift to the south, a vast expanse of land from Thanh Hóa to Thuận Hóa fell into the hands of the Lam Sơn forces, with the exception of a few isolated areas still held by the Ming army, standing alone "like islands in the sea". The balance of power between the two sides had shifted, as the remaining Ming forces in Jiaozhi were no longer strong enough to pose a military threat to the Lam Sơn movement. Additionally, during this time, numerous uprisings began to emerge in northern Jiaozhi. Along with the uprisings of the Viet people, the Red Coat movement of the mountain people also gained momentum in the northwest region, and even spread to Yunnan. Chen Zhi and the local chieftain Đèo Cát Hãn repeatedly launched military campaigns to suppress them but were consistently defeated, forced to take refuge in the Đông Quan citadel, waiting for reinforcements. The Ming forces lacked sufficient strength to organize campaigns to eliminate the scattered rebellions in the northern regions, let alone lift the sieges on their strongholds further south. Realizing the opportunity had ripened, Lê Lợi decided to shift his focus to advancing into the north.

In Beijing, on 29 May 1425, the Hongxi Emperor died after reigning for less than a year. His eldest son and heir, Zhu Zhanji, ascended the throne as the Xuande Emperor. Facing increasing pressure in Jiaozhi, the Xuande Emperor proposed restoring the Trần dynasty lineage and reestablishing the tributary vassal system as during the Hongwu era, with triennial tribute payments. This aimed to stabilize the region and alleviate the war burden on the imperial court. Two opposing viewpoints emerged within the court: the faction of Jian Yi and Xia Yuanji advocated for continuing the military campaign, while the faction of Yang Shiqi and Yang Rong supported the Emperor's decision. The Xuande Emperor, temporarily convinced by the war faction, decided to reinforce the forces in Jiaozhi. On 20 April 1426, he sent two reinforcements to support Chen Zhi: one led by Wang Anlao advancing through Yunnan, and the other led by Wang Tong advancing through Guangxi, but it took 6 months for this force to gather and reach Đông Quan. Upon receiving news that enemy reinforcements were on their way, the Lam Sơn rebels planned to advance north.

=== Initial skirmishes in the northern territories ===
In late August and early September 1426, Lê Lợi divided his troops into three divisions to advance north. The first division, led by Phạm Văn Xảo, Lý Triện, Trịnh Khả, and Đỗ Bí, consisted of 3,000 troops and one war elephant. They marched along the Thiên Quan route to Tuyên Quang, (Note: Thiên Quan: A territory of the former Hoàng Long district, now located in Nho Quan district, Ninh Bình province.) with the goal of threatening the Đông Quan citadel from the west and blocking enemy reinforcements from Yunnan. The second division, commanded by Lưu Nhân Chú and Bùi Bị, consisted of 4,000 troops and two war elephants. They moved to Thiên Trường and Kiến Xương to seize the Red River estuary, preventing the Ming troops from retreating via watetways from Nghệ An. They then advanced to Khoái Châu, Bắc Giang, and Lạng Giang to block reinforcements from Guangxi. The third division, led by Đinh Lễ and Nguyễn Xí, consisted of 2,000 troops and advanced later to "demonstrate formidable momentum". Despite their relatively small numbers, the Lam Sơn rebels operated effectively across northern Vietnam's lowlands, midlands, and highlands, thanks to strong popular support from the local population.

On 12 October, the division commanded by Phạm Văn Xảo and Lý Triện approached Đông Quan citadel from the southwest. The Ming troops, mistakenly assuming their opponents were fatigued from long marches, launched a counterattack at Ninh Kiều (Note: Ninh Kiều: An area in Ninh Sơn, Chương Mỹ district, Hanoi. This was a strategically vital and perilous location situated on the thượng đạo road leading from Đông Quan to Thiên Quan and Thanh Hóa.) but were decisively repelled, resulting in the loss of over 2,000 men. After this victory, the Lam Sơn army split into two forces: Phạm Văn Xảo and Trịnh Khả moved up the Red River to Tam Đới to block Ming reinforcements from Yunnan, while Lý Triện and Đỗ Bí established defensive positions west of the Đáy River. The activities of the division led by Lưu Nhân Chú and Bùi Bị are not recorded in historical texts, but their mission may have failed when the two Ming generals, Li An and Fang Zheng, successfully retreated by sea from Nghệ An to Đông Quan. On 20 October, the division led by Phạm Văn Xảo and Trịnh Khả defeated 10,000 reinforcements of the Ming army under the command of Wang Anlao from Yunnan. The Ming army suffered over a thousand casualties, many drowned, and the remaining soldiers fled to the Tam Giang citadel. On the same day, Lý Triện also defeated a Ming army raid at Nhân Mục.

=== Change in Ming military command ===
On 31 October 1426, Wang Tong entered Đông Quan citadel and assumed command of all Ming forces in Jiaozhi. Defeated generals such as Chen Zhi and Fang Zheng were dismissed by the Ming court, but were given the opportunity to redeem themselves through acts of merit. With the arrival of reinforcements brought by Wang Tong and the withdrawal of Fang Zheng's troops from Nghệ An, the strength of the Ming army in Đông Quan was quickly bolstered. On 5 November, after a few days of reorganizing and restructuring the army and studying the movements of the Lam Sơn forces, Wang Tong decided to launch a counterattack to turn the tide. He divided the troops into three columns, each spaced about 10 to 15 kilometers apart in a straight line. Wang Tong personally led one coulumn from Đông Quan citadel via Tây Dương bridge (Cầu Giấy) to advance to Cổ Sở; (Note: Cổ Sở: Present-day Yên Sở commune, Hoài Đức district, Hanoi.) Fang Zheng advanced to Sa Đôi (Note: Sa Đôi: An old bridge on the Nhuệ River, connecting Mễ Trì and Đại Mỗ wards in present-day Nam Từ Liêm district, Hanoi.) via Yên Quyết bridge; Ma Qi and Shan Shou advanced to Thanh Oai via Nhân Mục bridge. (Note: Nhân Mục bridge: A bridge crossing the Tô Lịch River, located on the road from Đông Quan to Ninh Kiều. It is now Mọc bridge, situated in Nhân Chính ward, Thanh Xuân district, Hanoi.)

On the Lam Sơn side, Lý Triện and Đỗ Bí were stationed to the south, closest to Ma Qi's forces. After setting up an ambush in the Cổ Lãm fields, the Lam Sơn army sent out a small detachment to provoke the enemy and then feigned retreat to lure them in. In their fervent pursuit, the Ming troops advanced directly into the ambush zone in the flooded fields of Tam La. (Note: Tam La: Also known as Ba La or Ba La Bông Đỏ, located near present-day Hà Đông district, Hanoi, on the road to Thanh Oai district.) Seizing the moment when the Ming soldiers were trapped in the mud, the Lam Sơn ambush forces immediately struck their flanks. Stuck and unable to defend themselves, the Ming troops could only attempt to flee back the way they came, pursued and attacked all the way to Nhân Mục bridge. The defeat at Tam La shattered the Ming army's three-pronged offensive plan, forcing Wang Tong to change his battle strategy. On 6 November 1426, the forces of Lý Triện and Đỗ Bí launched a surprise attack on the Ming army's outlying camp at Cổ Sở ferry, but Wang Tong having anticipated the move, had already prepared an ambush, defeating the Lam Sơn assault. Forced to retreat after the failed attack, Lý Triện and Đỗ Bí had to withdraw and hold a more defensible position.

=== Tốt Động – Chúc Động ===
Taking advantage of their recent victory, Wang Tong planned to use their numerical superiority to launch an attack on the Lam Sơn army's headquarters in Ninh Kiều, but upon arrival, they discovered that the Lam Sơn army had already left. Unable to track their movements, the Ming army, which was in an offensive position, was forced to switch to a defensive one. In light of this situation, Chen Qia and others suggested sending scouts to investigate the treacherous terrain. Despite this advice, Wang Tong, confident in their overwhelming military power, remained determined to pursue the Lam Sơn army. He divided his forces into two divisions: the main force and the flanking force. Wang Tong himself led the main troops to cross the Đáy River at Ninh Kiều and advance straight to Cao Bộ. (Note: Cao Bộ: Its Nôm name is Bụa village, now in Trung Hòa commune, Chương Mỹ district, Hanoi.) The flanking force, consisting of cavalry and artillery, secretly crossed the Đáy River and took a detour through Tốt Động and Yên Duyệt. They then fired cannons from behind to distract the Lam Sơn troops. Once the main army heard the signal, they would join the flanking unit from both sides to launch a coordinated attack.

On the morning of 7 November 1426, the Ming army divided and attacked the Lam Sơn military camp from two directions. Based on intelligence reports, Lam Sơn's forces had already anticipated this plan. When the main Ming column, led by Wang Tong, reached Tốt Động, the Lam Sơn troops deliberately fired cannons to lure the enemy into a trap. Mistaking the cannon fire for a signal from their own flanking detachment, and seeing no movement—as Lam Sơn soldiers had been ordered to remain hidden despite the noise—Wang Tong assumed no enemy forces were nearby and ordered his troops to advance. The Ming vanguard soon found itself ambushed at Tốt Động, with Lam Sơn forces launching a coordinated assault from multiple directions. Caught off guard in unfavorable weather and terrain, Ming units became bogged down and lost combat effectiveness. Meanwhile, at Chúc Động, Wang Tong's rear guard, having just crossed the Đáy River, was ambushed and annihilated. The Ming flanking detachment, originally tasked with taking a shortcut to Cao Bộ to create a diversion with cannon fire, hastily retreated to Đông Quan in disarray upon learning of their main force's destruction.

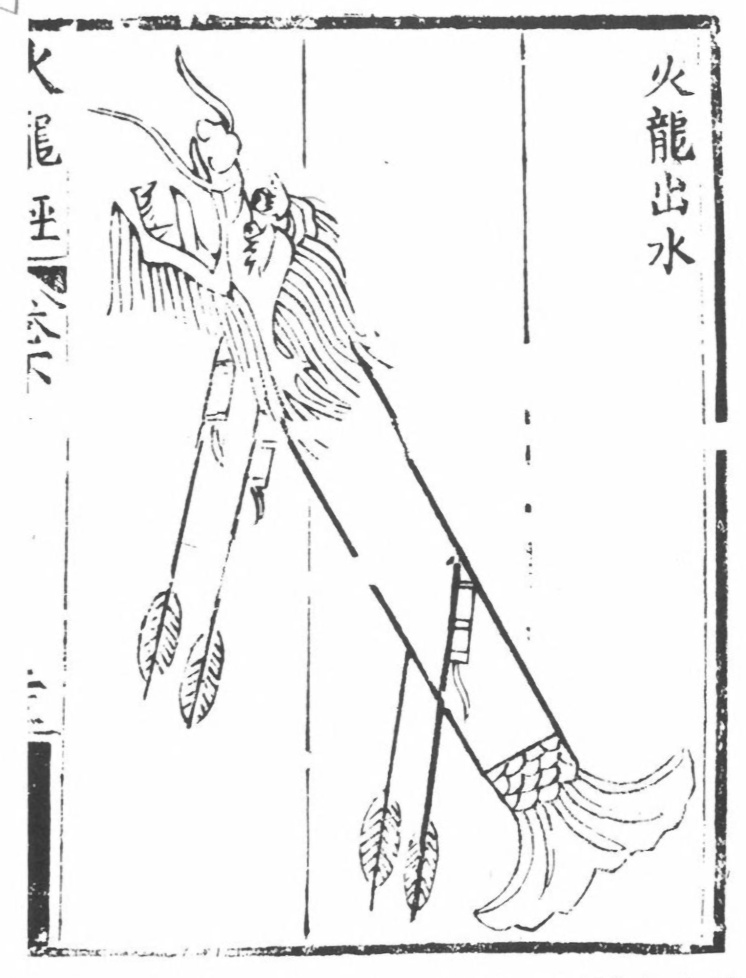
In the early stage of the Lam Sơn uprising, the Ming army possessed an overwhelming technological superiority with advanced weaponry and military equipment, allowing them to maintain dominance on the battlefield. However, over time, the Lam Sơn rebels continuously adopted and utilized technology from the Ming army itself, gradually narrowing the gap and enabling them to confront the enemy on equal terms. The illustration depicts a 'fire dragon rising out of the water' (Huolongchushui), a type of early rocket recorded in Liu Bowen's book Huolongjing.

The entire Ming army retreating via Chúc Động was fiercely ambushed by Lam Sơn rebels. Chen Qia fell in battle, while Wang Tong himself suffered severe injuries before barely escaping with Ma Qi through Ninh Kiều back to Đông Quan. Some of the remaining soldiers followed Fang Zheng, fleeing to the Cổ Sở ferry and returning to Đông Quan. After the battle, the Lam Sơn army collected a vast amount of horses, military supplies, weapons, and vehicles. In contrast, the Ming army suffered significant losses and Wang Tong was forced to destroy two of the Four Great Treasures of Annam, the Quy Điền Bell and the Phổ Minh Cauldron, in order to make ammunition and weapons. In addition to the weapons collected, the Lam Sơn army also gained valuable military technology from the Ming prisoners of war and captives. As a result, the technological gap between the two sides gradually narrowed. By utilizing Ming technology against them, the newly acquired or manufactured weapons greatly contributed to the future victories of the Lam Sơn army. With the heavy losses suffered by the Ming army in the Battle of Tốt Động – Chúc Động, the tide of the war began to turn in favor of the Lam Sơn rebels.

=== Siege of Đông Quan ===
Upon receiving news of the victory at Tốt Động – Chúc Động, Lê Lợi, who was still in Thanh Hóa at the time, immediately led his main forces north to personally command the campaign to attack Đông Quan. On the night of 22 November 1426, the Lam Sơn naval forces, led by Trần Nguyên Hãn and Bùi Bị, attacked from the east, while Đinh Lễ's infantry struck from the west, coordinating an assault and setting fire to the Ming army's outposts outside Đông Quan's walls. Fang Zheng's forces, tasked with defending the peripheral bases, were caught off guard and forced to retreat into the citadel. The Lam Sơn rebels seized numerous boats and weapons abandoned by the Ming troops. After losing their outposts and vast rural areas surrounding Đông Quan, Vương Thông had no choice but to dig in inside the citadel, desperately awaiting reinforcements.

In the midst of a tight siege, the Ming army in Đông Quan citadel faced the predicament of being "surrounded on all sides". The loss of contact with the outside world prevented Wang Tong from mobilizing troops from other citadels, who were also in a similar situation as Đông Quan, to come to the rescue. It also hindered him from seeking assistance from the imperial court. On the Lam Sơn side, although they had gained the upper hand, they did not have enough strength at the time to attack the heavily fortified Đông Quan. Lê Lợi ordered his troops to continue the siege while also having Nguyễn Trãi write a letter to persuade Wang Tong to surrender. In a perilous situation, Wang Tong used the pretext of retrieving the Pacification of Annam Edict issued by the Yongle Emperor in 1407 during the invasion of the Hồ dynasty, which stated that he would withdraw his troops if Lê Lợi restored a Trần dynasty descendant to the throne. In response, Lê Lợi installed Trần Cảo, allegedly a grandson of Trần Nghệ Tông, as king. After Lê Lợi complied with this request, peace negotiations between the two sides began. Wang Tong was also given the condition by Lam Sơn to issue orders for the troops in various places to surrender their cities and withdraw to Đông Quan. Following orders from higher authorities, the Ming troops stationed in Nghệ An, Diễn Châu, Tân Bình, and Thuận Hóa successively opened their gates and surrendered to the Lam Sơn troops, with the exception of Thanh Hóa.

Wang Tong's decision to pursue peace was met with strong opposition from the pro-war faction, led by Fang Zheng and Ma Qi, who had both served in Jiaozhi for many years. Additionally, Viet officials such as Trần Phong and Lương Nhữ Hốt also opposed Wang Tong's intentions. Despite this opposition, Wang Tong hesitated in his decision, until the Xuande Emperor once again sent a large army, led by Liu Sheng, to Jiaozhi. Feeling that the situation had changed, Wang Tong ultimately decided to abandon his pursuit of peace negotiations. He ordered the reinforcement of Đông Quan citadel in preparation for the upcoming battle.

== End of the war ==
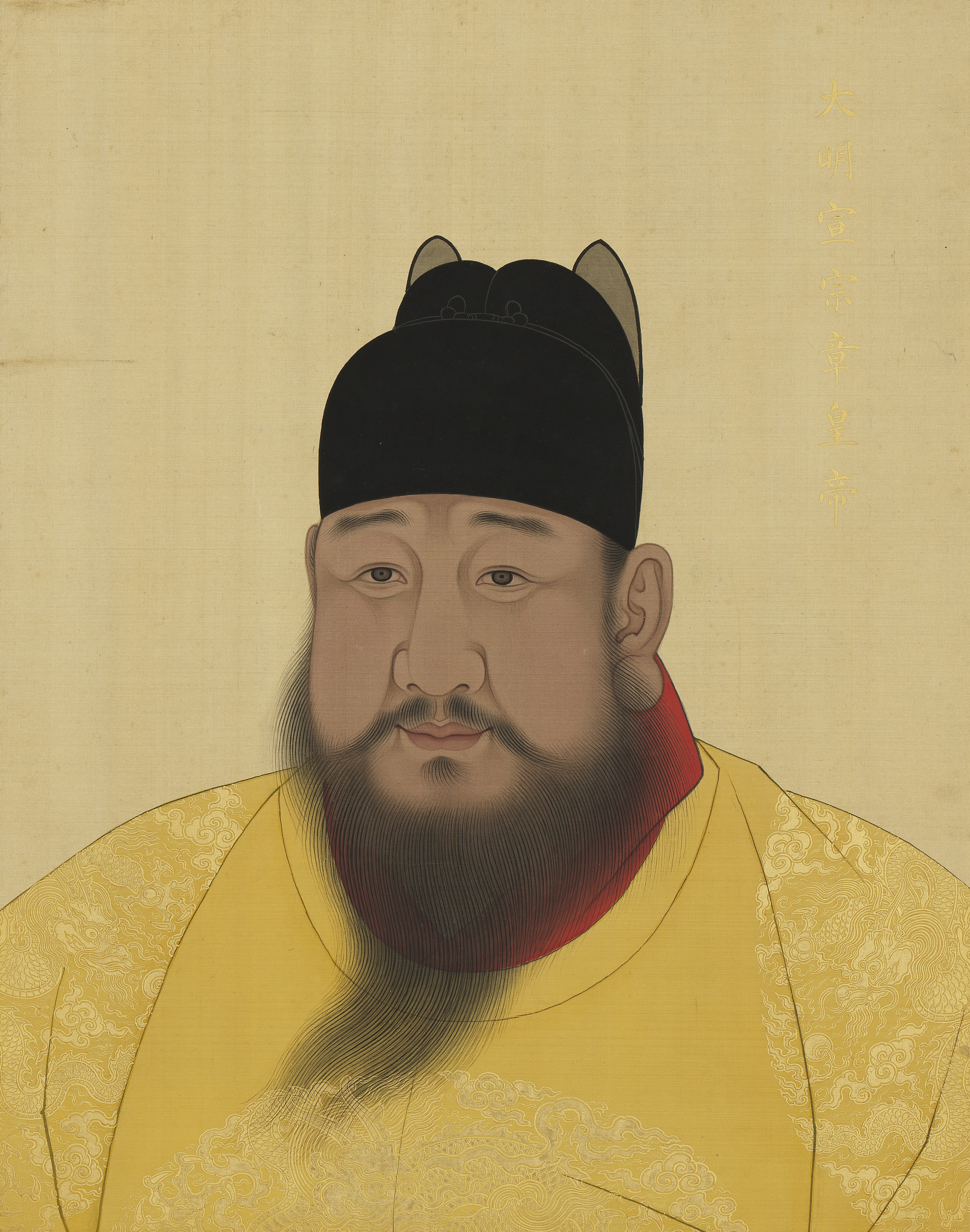
The Xuande Emperor, although no longer interested in Jiaozhi, was still determined to suppress the Lam Sơn uprising before withdrawing his troops.

On 23 January 1427, in an attempt to salvage the situation in Jiaozhi, the Xuande Emperor issued an edict ordering Liu Sheng and Mu Sheng to lead 70,000 troops to relieve Wang Tong. In April of the same year, the Ming emperor dispatched an additional 45,200 reinforcements to Jiaozhi, bringing the total rescue force under Liu Sheng and Mu Sheng to 115,200 men. The Ming army advanced into Jiaozhi in two wings: the main force, commanded by Liu Sheng, marched through Guangxi, while the remaining troops, led by Mu Sheng, entered via Yunnan. Despite mobilizing such a massive force, this military campaign did not signify the Xuande Emperor's intention to maintain direct rule over Annam. Instead, he sought to transform the region into a vassal state. His plan was to first suppress Lê Lợi's rebellion and then install a Trần dynasty descendant as new ruler, thereby restoring Annam's status as a tributary of the Ming dynasty.

After receiving news of approaching enemy reinforcements, several generals urged Lê Lợi to quickly attack Đông Quan, but Lê Lợi believed that "attacking a citadel is the last resort" and was concerned about the risk of the enemy attacking from multiple directions. Instead, he advocated for the strategy of "besieging the citadel while destroying reinforcements". Realizing that the Lam Sơn forces were too thin to both the siege and intercept both relief armies, Lê Lợi decided to concentrate his troops to eliminate each enemy column one by one. To prevent any possibility of communication between the relief forces and the remaining Ming strongholds, Lê Lợi ordered attacks on all the citadels along the route from China to Đông Quan. Bùi Quốc Hưng was tasked with besieging the Điêu Diêu (Note: Điêu Diêu: Now in Gia Lâm district, Hanoi.) and Thị Cầu citadels, Lê Sát and Lê Thụ were ordered to besiege the Khâu Ôn citadel, (Note: Khâu Ôn: Now in Lạng Sơn province.) and Trịnh Khả and Đỗ Khuyển were tasked with besieging the Tam Giang citadel. Additionally, in order to increase pressure, Lê Lợi ordered a tight siege on the four gates of Đông Quan. Despite a previous agreement, Lê Lợi ambushed the Ming troops retreating from the southern citadels, fearing that this force would significantly bolster the Ming army in Đông Quan.

On 9 February 1427, Lê Sát and Lê Thụ successfully captured Khâu Ôn citadel. The fall of this stronghold dealt a severe psychological blow, significantly demoralizing Ming troops stationed in other citadels along the route to Đông Quan. Seizing this opportunity, Nguyễn Trãi wrote letters urging the surrender of Zhang Lin and Chen Yun, the commanders of Điêu Diêu citadel, which was then under siege by Bùi Quốc Hưng. Persuaded by Nguyễn Trãi's arguments, the two Ming generals surrendered with their troops. During this period, acting on Lê Lợi's orders, Nguyễn Trãi also repeatedly sent letters demanding Wang Tong's surrender and the release of prisoners. Vương Thông outwardly agreed to Lê Lợi's terms, even promising to withdraw his main forces from Đông Quan. His true intention, however, was to buy time while awaiting reinforcements.

On 4 March 1427, in an effort to boost the morale of their armies, Fang Zheng launched a surprise attack on Lý Triện's camp at Quả Động. The Lam Sơn troops were caught off guard and overwhelmed, resulting in the capture of Đỗ Bí and the death of Lý Triện, but this victory did not have the desired effect on the morale of the Ming troops. Shortly after the incident at Đông Quan, the officials and soldiers guarding Thị Cầu citadel were forced to surrender after being besieged by Nguyễn Chích for an extended period of time. In an attempt to turn the tide, Wang Tong launched another raid at Sa Đôi field on 16 March, but was repelled. On 2 April, Nguyễn Trãi successfully persuaded Liu Qing, the general guarding Tam Giang citadel, the last stronghold on the route from Yunnan to Đông Quan. To prevent the situation from worsening, Wang Tong personally led an elite unit to raid the camp guarded by Lê Nguyễn in Tây Phù Liệt (Note: Phù Liệt: Now in Thanh Trì district, Hanoi.) on 4 April. Generals Đinh Lễ and Nguyễn Xí quickly brought 500 thiết đột troops (Note: Thiết đột: The elite shock troops of the Lam Sơn rebels, established shortly after the Lũng Nhai oath in 1416. They were typically equipped with strong armor and powerful weapons.) to reinforce the attack. The Lam Sơn army coordinated their attack from two fronts, successfully repelling the Ming troops, but Đinh Lễ and Nguyễn Xí were captured by the Ming army during the pursuit. Đinh Lễ was executed, while Nguyễn Xí managed to escape from prison.

=== Battle of Chi Lăng – Xương Giang ===
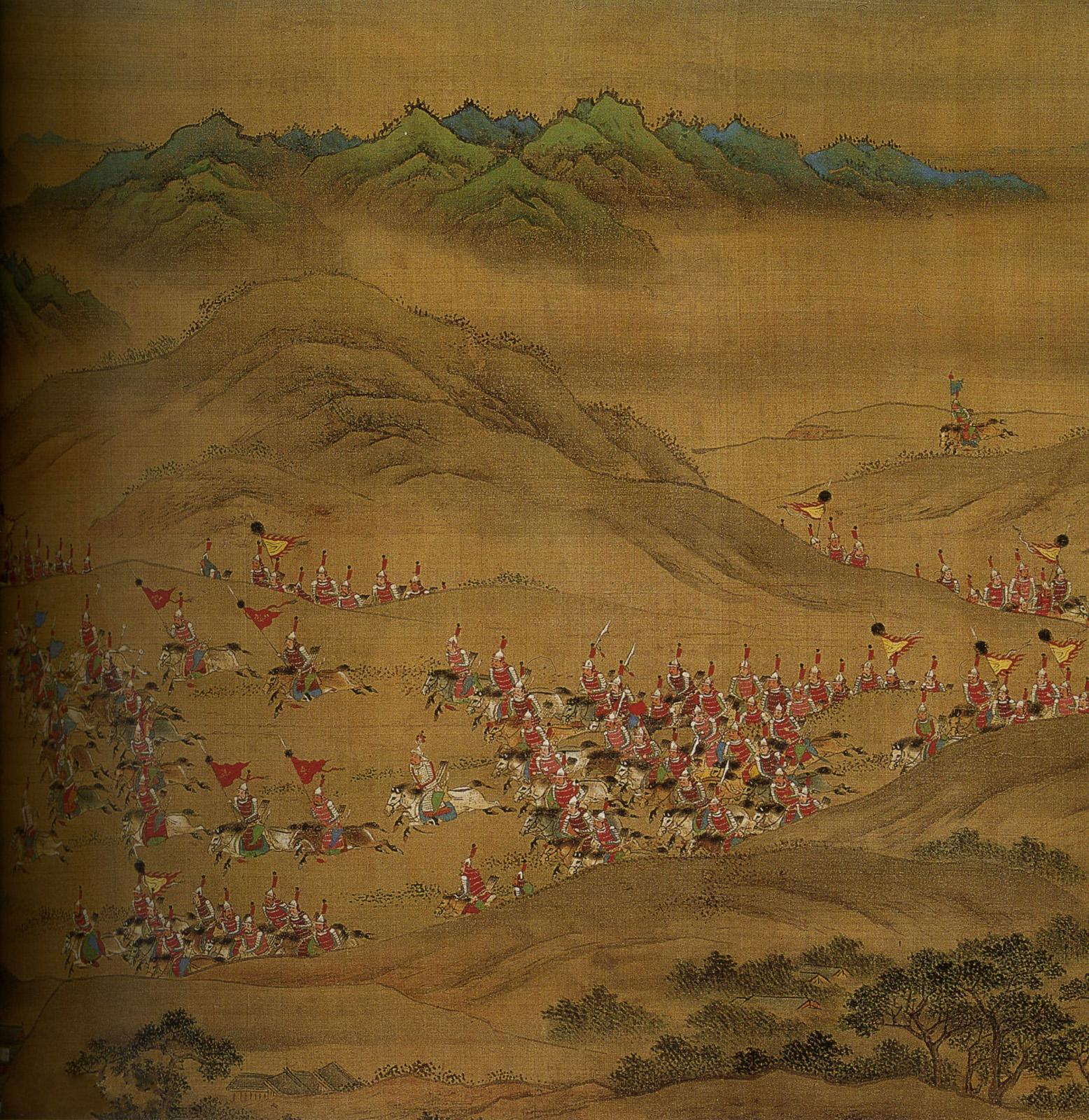
Ming cavalry charges forward, illustration from Pingfan desheng tu (平番得勝圖), depicting the campaign to pacify nomadic tribes in Northwest China during the early Wanli era.

In order to intercept the Ming reinforcements at the border, Lê Lợi implemented a strategy of stationing Trần Lựu and Lê Bôi at Pha Lũy pass to block the troops from Guangxi, while Trần Ban was assigned to hold Lê Hoa pass and stop the troops from Yunnan. At that time, the Lam Son army had successfully taken control of all the citadels along the route from Đông Quan to Lê Hoa and Pha Lũy, with the exception of Xương Giang citadel, where the Ming army, led by Li Ren, was still fiercely resisting. In July 1427, Liu Sheng and Mu Sheng were unable to launch their campaign due to insufficient troop mobilization. As a result, the Ming court hastily ordered Gu Xingzu, the Regional Commander of Guangxi, to lead local forces into Jiaozhi first. Upon reaching Pha Lũy Pass, this force was ambushed and routed by Trần Lựu and Lê Bôi.

After receiving news of Gu Xingzu's defeat at Pha Lũy Pass, Liu Sheng and Mu Sheng quickly mobilized their troops. Aiming to capture Xương Giang citadel before Ming reinforcements could enter Jiaozhi, Trần Nguyên Hãn and Lê Sát ordered an immediate assault on the citadel. Possessing superior military strength, the Lam Sơn command launched attacks from four directions, utilizing siege engines, cannons, and tunneling tactics to breach the defenses. However, all assaults were repelled by the citadel's garrison forces under the command of Li Ren. Nevertheless, the garrison defending Xương Giang was severely weakened at that time due to critical shortages of food supplies and manpower. On 28 September 1427, the Lam Sơn army launched a final, massive assault, broke through the defensive lines, and captured the citadel. Li Ren and many Ming commanders committed suicide. Thousands of soldiers and civilians were massacred by the Lam Sơn forces in the aftermath of the siege.

After successfully conquering Xương Giang citadel, the Lam Sơn army began preparing to face the Ming reinforcements. To intercept the main force led by Liu Sheng, Lê Lợi deployed Lê Sát, Lưu Nhân Chú, Lê Văn Linh, and Đinh Liệt in an ambush at Chi Lăng Pass. He also sent Lê Văn An and Nguyễn Lý as a reinforcement force. Lê Lợi assessed that Mu Sheng, the leader of the second column coming from Yunnan, was a cautious man who would wait to see the outcome of Liu Sheng's campaign before acting. Therefore, he ordered the generals defending Lê Hoa Pass to hold their defense without engaging in battle. When the vanguard, personally commanded by Liu Sheng, reached Pha Lũy Pass, Trần Lựu pretended to be defeated and retreated to Lưu Pass, and then further back to Chi Lăng Pass. Liu Sheng, believing that the Lam Sơn forces were weak, led over 100 cavalrymen away from the main army to pursue them. Upon reaching the flank of Mã Yên Mountain, Liu Sheng fell into an ambush and was killed by the forces of Lê Sát and Trần Lựu.

After the loss of their commander-in-chief, the main Ming army, led by Huang Fu and Cui Ju, attempted to retreat to Xương Giang citadel, but upon arrival, they discovered that the citadel had already fallen. Lê Lợi quickly ordered Trần Nguyên Hãn to cut off their supply routes and dispatched Phạm Vấn and Nguyễn Xí to join forces with Lê Sát and attack. This resulted in the annihilation of the entire remaining Ming force at Xương Giang. Cui Ju was killed, while Huang Fu surrendered and was spared. On the western front, Mu Sheng, who had been stationed in the area from Lê Hoa Pass to Lãnh Thủy bridge, immediately ordered a withdrawal upon hearing the news of Liu Sheng's death in battle. During his retreat, he was pursued and defeated by forces commanded by Phạm Văn Xảo and Trịnh Khả.

=== Đông Quan oath ===
After defeating the reinforcements of Liu Sheng and Mu Sheng, the Lam Sơn rebels had gained a significant advantage over the Ming army. In light of this, Wang Tong agreed to enter negotiations to end the war. As a sign of good faith, Lê Lợi sent his eldest son, Lê Tư Tề, and General Lưu Nhân Chú into Đông Quan, while Wang Tong's side sent Shan Shou and Ma Qi as hostages to the Lam Sơn military camp in Bồ Đề. (Note: Bồ Đề: According to the Bắc Ninh tỉnh chí, Bồ Đề military post was originally part of Phú Hựu village, Gia Lâm district, Thuận An prefecture, in the former Bắc Ninh province. Today, it corresponds to Phú Viên commune, Gia Lâm district, Hanoi.) On 16 December 1427, a ceremony was held south of Đông Quan, where Vương Thông and his generals, along with the commanders of the Lam Sơn rebels, took an oath. During the negotiations, the two sides discussed the withdrawal date of the Ming army and the Lam Sơn rebels' request to recognize Trần Cảo.

Both sides strictly adhered to the agreed-upon terms. On 17 December 1427, the Lam Sơn envoy delegation departed for Beijing, returning the credentials and personal effects of the confiscated generals and officials. They also presented a memorial requesting imperial recognition and a list detailing the Ming officers, soldiers, and horses held in Jiaozhi who were to be returned. Faced with an irretrievable situation, the Xuande Emperor, who was already leaning towards the pro-peace faction led by Yang Shiqi, agreed to withdraw his troops. Despite knowing that Trần Cảo was a puppet king, the Ming emperor issued an imperial edict enfeoffing Cảo as "King of Annam". Before the order to withdraw troops could reach Wang Tong, all Ming forces in Jiaozhi had already retreated back to China.

After the oath ceremony, Lê Lợi gathered the Ming soldiers who had either surrendered or been captured earlier. He arranged for their repatriation and also took the initiative to repair bridges and roads, prepare food supplies, boats, and horses to facilitate the Ming army's return to their homeland. Before their departure, all Ming generals, officials, and soldiers came to Bồ Đề to pay their respects to Lê Lợi and were treated with great hospitality. On 29 December 1427, the Ming army officially began their journey home, followed by Wang Tong on 3 January 1428. According to Ming records, a total of 84,640 soldiers and officials were released by Lê Lợi and allowed to return, excluding those who chose to stay. While some estimates suggest that the total number of Ming personnel (both military and civilian) repatriated may have reached 300,000, historian Phạm Văn Sơn dismissed this claim as "somewhat exaggerated" and proposed a more plausible figure of around 200,000.

== Aftermath ==
In the context of the Ming dynasty's continued strong influence in the region, Lê Lợi faced the challenge of balancing power to ensure legitimacy and preserve long-term peace with the northern court. To ease tensions in the initial phase, Lê Lợi continued to use Trần Cảo, a purported descendant of the Trần dynasty, as a political pawn in order to gain trust with the Ming. Despite being enfeoffed by the Ming as the "King of Annam", Trần Cảo received little support from the majority of the Lam Sơn rebels and held no real authority in the government. Once the Ming army withdrew from Đại Việt, Trần Cảo lost his usefulness and died suddenly in February 1428. According to many primary sources, Cảo, aware of his lack of merit and popular support, fled to the Ngọc Ma region but was captured and forced to drink poison. Some historians have cast doubt on this account, suggesting that Lê Lợi orchestrated Cảo's death.

On 29 April 1428, Lê Lợi ascended the throne, adopting the era name Thuận Thiên, restoring the nation's title as Đại Việt, and establishing the Later Lê dynasty. Due to the complicated political situation and the need to solidify his power, Lê Lợi entrusted Nguyễn Trãi to write the Bình Ngô đại cáo. This proclamation announced the victory, declared Đại Việt's independence, and affirmed the sovereignty and legitimacy of the newly formed dynasty. In terms of foreign relations, Lê Lợi sent envoys to the Ming court, claiming that Trần Cảo had died and that he was the rightful successor to the throne. Initially, the Ming court refused to acknowledge Lê Lợi's rule and demanded that another descendant of the Trần dynasty be found. It was only after repeated assertions that the Trần lineage had died out that the Xuande Emperor reluctantly granted Lê Lợi provisional authority to govern Annam and bestowed upon him the title "administrator of the affairs of the state of Annam" (權署安南國事; Quyền thự An Nam quốc sự) in 1431. It was not until 1435 that the Ming officially recognized Lê Lợi as the "King of Annam" (An Nam Quốc vương).

The recognition from the Ming dynasty brought about a period of stability in the diplomatic relations between Đại Việt and China. In an effort to recreate the relationship of the Trần era, the Ming adopted a policy of reconciliation with the Later Lê dynasty, establishing a tributary system characterized by the phrase "give more but take less" (厚往薄来). (Note: "Give more but take less" (厚往薄来; Hòuwǎng báolái; Hậu vãng bạc lai): A policy in China's tributary relations from the Song dynasty onward, whereby China received modest gifts from vassal states but reciprocated with far more lavish and valuable rewards. This policy emphasized ritual propriety and diplomatic symbolism, prioritizing sincerity and the demonstration of imperial benevolence over material gains from subordinate states.) This system was primarily a ceremonial exchange that prioritized ritual over material gain. Although Đại Việt participated in China's tributary system as a vassal state, it maintained complete independence in all other aspects. In practice, the Lê rulers continued the policy of "Emperor at home, king abroad" that was followed by previous dynasties like the Lý and Trần. This meant that they styled themselves as "king" in diplomatic relations with the northern court, but ruled domestically and among neighboring states as "emperor".

== Impact ==
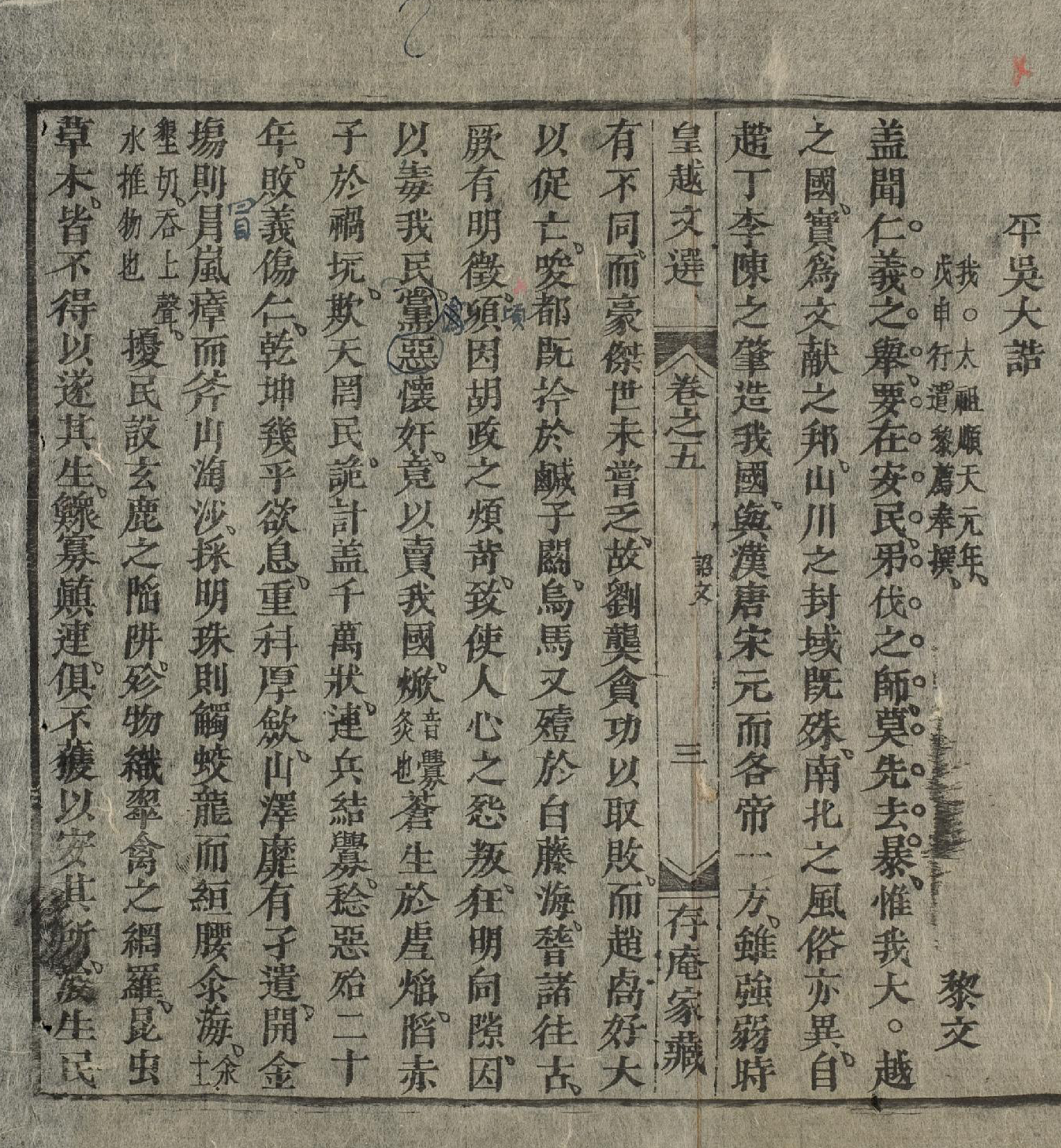
The first page of the Bình Ngô đại cáo—the second "Declaration of independence" of the Viet people—was transcribed in Bùi Huy Bích's Hoàng Việt văn tuyển, published in 1825.

The Ming invasion was not just a military conflict, but also involved a comprehensive colonization plan. This included the imposition of a Chinese-style education system, the organization of Chinese-language civil examinations, and the migration of northern settlers to change the demographic structure. The Lam Sơn uprising completely transformed the situation. This movement emerged from the mountainous regions, which were less influenced by Han culture. Not only did they resist the Ming, but they also opposed pro-Ming factions in the lowlands, particularly the deeply Sinicized elite class.

In the Bình Ngô đại cáo, Nguyễn Trãi proclaimed Đại Việt to be a "domain of manifest civility" (văn hiến chi bang), (Note: "Domain of Manifest Civility" (文獻之邦; Văn hiến chi bang) is a Sino-Vietnamese phrase meaning "a nation with a long-standing tradition of culture and scholarship". This term is often used to describe a country with a developed culture, a tradition of academic learning, and a long history of cultural, ethical, and intellectual achievements. In the context of the Bình Ngô đại cáo, Nguyễn Trãi used this phrase to affirm Đại Việt as an independent civilization, possessing a rich cultural heritage and being not inferior to China, thereby refuting the Ming dynasty's legitimacy in ruling Đại Việt.) an independent cultural entity that had existed since antiquity with clearly defined territories and its own "mountains, rivers, and borders". This declaration served not only to reject the Ming dynasty's claims of legitimacy over Đại Việt's territory but also represented a direct challenge to Chinese imperial ideology, asserting that the Lê dynasty constituted an independent and legitimate "realm under heaven" (thiên hạ), equal in status to the northern court and neither subordinate nor beholden to it. According to historian Kathlene Baldanza, the Lam Sơn uprising's victory not only ended the Ming's colonial threat but also forged a new worldview for the Viet people. From the Viets perspective, Đại Việt was the "Southern Kingdom" (Nam Quốc), where a Southern emperor ruled with his own distinct Mandate of Heaven, while simultaneously acknowledging the parallel existence of both Northern and Southern emperors. In contrast, the Ming dynasty refused to recognize the independent authority of Đại Việt's emperor, viewing China as the sole center of the "realm under heaven" and maintaining that "one sky cannot have two suns". This fundamental divergence in perspectives established a unique Vietnam-China relationship model that preserved Vietnam's autonomy and self-determination. While participating in the tributary diplomatic system, the Viets steadfastly maintained their cultural identity and sovereign authority, positioning themselves as co-inheritors of ancient Huaxia civilization while remaining politically independent.

The Ming dynasty, driven by hegemonic ambitions in the region, employed military and economic intimidation tactics, notably through maritime expeditions, to expand their influence, mirroring later colonial campaigns by the Spanish and Portuguese empires. Their failure in Đại Việt forced strategic recalibration and reduced expansionist designs, while military and administrative innovations strengthened Đại Việt, facilitating centralized state-building and southern territorial expansion. One of the key innovations introduced by the Ming was advanced military technology, particularly firearms, which were adopted by Đại Việt. By the 15th century, Đại Việt was able to leverage these innovations to subdue Champa, ending their centuries-long conflict. Đại Việt also adopted Ming cultural and administrative standards, which significantly influenced the organization of its government apparatus and cultural life after regaining independence. The subsequent administrative system, examination model, and certain aspects of Viet culture and customs all reflected changes from the Ming occupation period, establishing a new foundation for the development of the early Lê dynasty. Some historians have characterized the Ming defeat in Đại Việt as an early sign of a broader erosion of China's preeminent position. Other evidence, however, complicates this view: the Ming state later mobilized large-scale military resources during the Imjin War against Japan in Korea, and the Qing subsequently restored the tributary framework. Taken together, these developments suggest continuity in the functioning of the Chinese imperial order rather than an abrupt or irreversible decline.

== Notes ==
=== Geographical names ===
The information about geographical names is referenced from Đại Việt sử ký toàn thư, translated by the Vietnam Academy of Social Sciences and published in 1993.
