= Battle of Tốt Động – Chúc Động =

1426 decisive battle of the Lam Sơn Uprising

- Part of Lam Sơn uprising
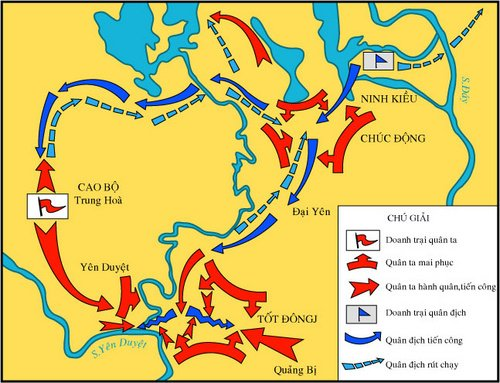
Date	November 7, 1426
Location	Tốt Động, Chương Mĩ, Hanoi
Result	Vietnamese victory

Belligerents
Vietnamese Lam Sơn rebels	Ming dynasty

Commanders and leaders
Lý Triện; Đinh Lễ; Đỗ Bí; Nguyễn Xí; Trương Chiến	Wang Tong; Fang Zheng; Ma Qi; Shan Shou; Li An; Chen Qia; Ma Ying

Strength
6,000	Vietnamese source: 100,000; Chinese source: 54,000

Casualties and losses
Unknown	Vietnamese source: 50,000 killed 10,000 captured. Chinese source: 20,000–30,000 killed

The Battle of Tốt Động – Chúc Động or the Battle of Tụy Động (Chinese: 崒洞祝洞之戰) in 1426 was the decisive battle in the 14-year Lam Sơn uprising which established Vietnam's independence from Ming China in 1428. The battle took place on November 7, 1426 in the Red River Delta between Tốt Động and Chúc Động, two villages of Chương Mỹ District, near Hanoi. Armed with hand cannons, the Vietnamese force under Lê Lợi, the Prince of Pacification, was able to stage a successful ambush on the attacking a Ming army, under General Wang Tong. The Ming army was decisively routed. As a result, most of the Chinese weapons, supplies, and horses were captured by the Vietnamese. Wang Tong was forced to retreat back to Dong Kinh, where four days later he and the city were besieged by Le Loi's army.

== Background ==
After the Ming dynasty conquered Dai Viet in 1407, a series of uprisings occurred. The most notable amongst these was the rebellion of the Later Tran Dynasty. Despite the odds, Later Tran's army made a significant victory at the battle of Bo Co. However, internal conflicts caused Later Tran's army to crack, and it gradually lost. By 1414, their army were completely defeated.

Thereafter, Zhang Fu turned to suppress other uprisings. In 1417, believing the slander of the eunuch Ma Ky, Yongle Emperor summoned Zhang Fu back to China. Although the situation in Jiaozhi at that time was stable, there was a potential of rebellion, especially in the Thanh Hoa and Nghệ An regions. In the latter region, people were still not willing to accept the Ming rule.

In 1418 the Lam Son uprising originated in Thanh Hoa which gradually achieved success. By 1426, Lam Sơn rebels gained control of Nghệ An province and most lands to its south. With this, the rebels shifted their attention to the north, where the Ming still controlled territory.

== Prelude ==
Le Loi's forces began advancing north. By November, general Lý Triện's forward detachments had arrived near Đông Quan. The Ming garrison assumed that this was the main Lam Sơn army, and went out to confront them near Ninh Kiều. The Ming were defeated, suffering 2,000 casualties. Three days after the initial engagement, another engagement occurred at the Nhân Mục bridge, in which another thousand Ming soldiers reportedly became casualties. The deteriorating situation forced generals Li An and Fang Zheng to withdraw their forces from Nghe An by sea and general Ma Ying to redeploy forces to rescue Đông Quan, as reinforcements from Yunnan had been ambushed by Trịnh Khả and fled to the citadel of Tam Giang. Together, these forces bolstered the garrison of Đông Quan.

== Battle ==
In early December, Wang Tong led his armies out of the citadel of Dong Quan to attack the Lam Son rebels. They split into three wings to attack from multiple directions. Lý Triện's forces skirmished with one and feigned a retreat past the Tam La bridge, an area filled with mud and rice paddies. The Ming were bogged down and ambushed, with Vietnamese sources claiming that a thousand were killed and five hundred captured.

On the 6th, Ly Trien's forces moved forward, but the Ming had set an ambush, setting up spiked bamboo barricades. The war elephants of the rebels trod on these spikes and stampeded, causing a temporary retreat. Lý Triện and Đố Bí pulled back, requesting reinforcements. The request was received by formations under the command of Nguyen Xi, Truong Chien, and Dinh Le, who dispatched 3,000 men as reinforcements and 2 war elephants. Several Ming spies were caught, and the generals discovered that Wang Tong was stationed in Ninh Kiều, planning to secretly position troops behind the small Lam Son force while crossing the river with the main body.

The plan was that upon hearing enemy weapons fire, the entire Ming force would concentrate its arrows upon the enemy formation and attack. However, Đinh Lễ and Lý Triện discovered this and ordered their troops to remain silent and not move. Due to this, the Ming assumed there were no nearby enemies, and took a shortcut. The Ming walked into an ambush near the Yên Duyệt River, in which the Lam Son forces suddenly emerged and advanced into the villages of Tột Động and Chúc Động, surprising and routing the Ming forces who attempted to flee across the river. Thousands were killed in the melee, and many more reportedly drowned, with Vietnamese sources claiming that 50,000 Ming soldiers died along with 10,000 being captured as prisoners of war. Wang Tong himself was wounded and fled with Ma Qi back to Dong Quan.

== Aftermath ==
The battle was a decisive victory for the Lam Son army, with a superior Ming force having been defeated. The Ming lost heavy amounts of weaponry and suffered heavy casualties. Casualty estimates range, with Vietnamese sources claiming 50,000 Ming troops dead and 10,000 captured, while the Ming Shilu estimates that around 20,000 to 30,000 soldiers died in that battle. This victory allowed the Vietnamese to encircle the citadel of Dong Quan and ruined Wang Tong's plans for an offensive. The battle contributed significantly to the eventual victory of the Lam Son Uprising, and was commemorated in the Binh Ngo Dai Cao
