= Nguyễn Chích =

Nguyễn Chích (阮隻), also Lê Chích (黎隻) (1382–1448), was an ethnic Mường general and advisor of Lê Lợi, the founding emperor of the Later Lê dynasty.

He was from Đông Ninh village, Đông Sơn District. He established the fort at Hoàng Nghiêu (modern Đông Nam) in Đông Sơn District. In 1425, during the Lam Sơn uprising, he encouraged Lê Lợi to invade Nghê An, then ruled by the Chinese Ming dynasty.
