= Bình Ngô đại cáo =

Vietnamese announcement

Bình Ngô đại cáo 平吳大誥
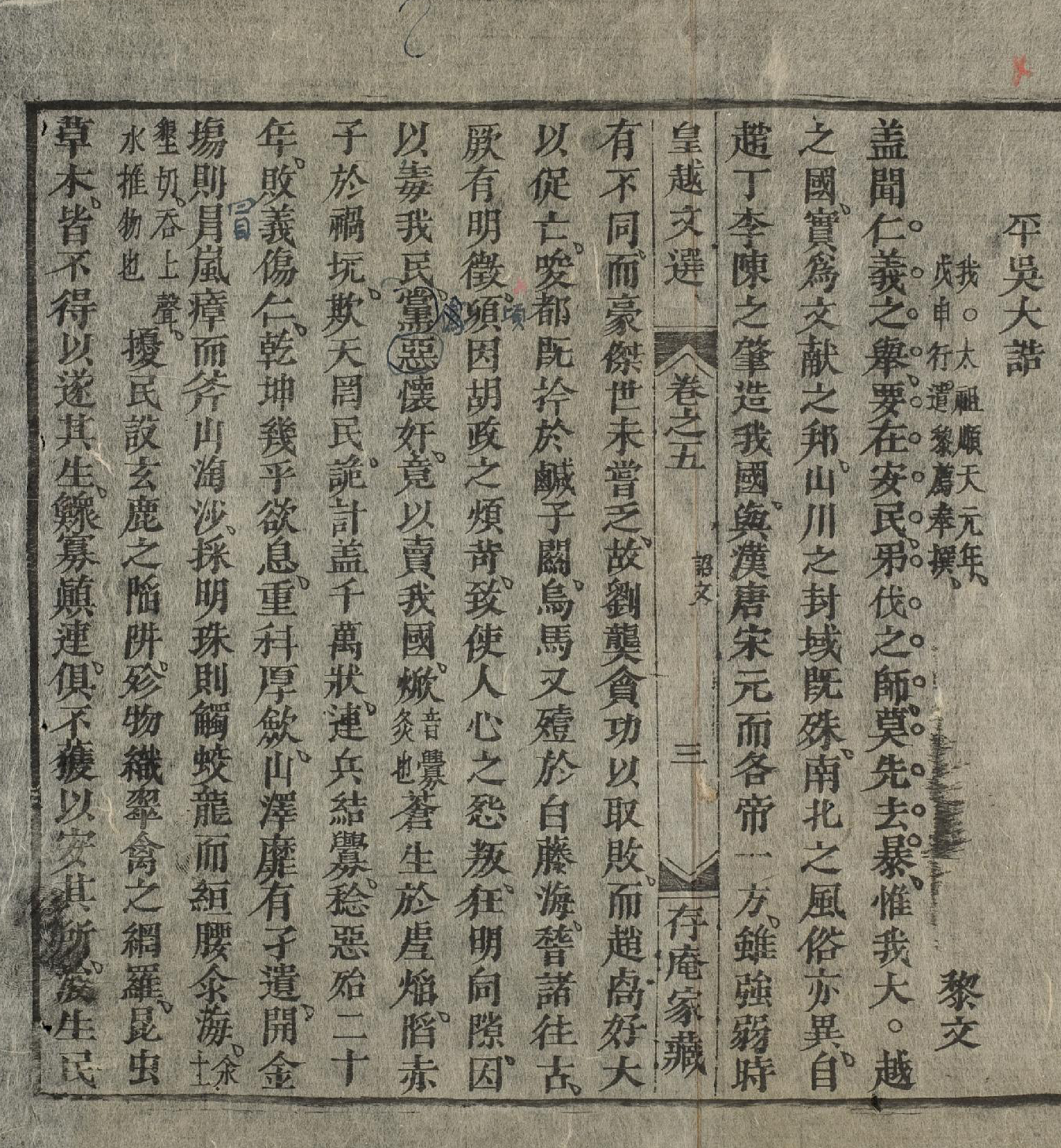
- First page of Bình Ngô đại cáo
- Created: 1428
- Author: Nguyễn Trãi
- Purpose: To announce the total pacification of the Ming dynasty and affirm the independence of Đại Việt

Bình Ngô đại cáo (chữ Hán: 平吳大誥, literally: Great proclamation upon the pacification of the Wu) was an announcement written by Nguyễn Trãi in 1428, at Lê Lợi's behest and on Lê Lợi's behalf, to proclaim the Lam Sơn's victory over the Ming imperialists and affirm the independence of Đại Việt to its people. The document was written in Classical Chinese.

== Naming ==
Bình Ngô đại cáo literally means Great Proclamation upon the Pacification of the Wu. Zhu Yuanzhang, the founder of the Ming dynasty, was a native of Hao Prefecture -which is now in Fengyang, Anhui, China and lies in the territory of the former state of (Eastern) Wu ([東]吳; Sino-Vietnamese: [Đông] Ngô) - and, in 1356, he himself took the title Duke of Wu (吳國公; SV: Ngô Quốc Công) and later King of Wu (吳王; SV: Ngô Vương). Therefore, one could reason that Nguyễn Trãi named his work Pacification of the Wu instead of Pacification of the Ming in order to subtly emphasize the victory of Đại Việt and the failure of the Ming dynasty which was called, in the proclamation, merely by the name Wu after its founder's ancestral land. The second part of the name, đại cáo (大誥) is commonly understood as the denotement of its literary genre, a great edict (cáo), or the announcement's great scale (đại cáo). The former was the name of a chapter in the book Classic of History in which great edict was a special form of an edict. But during the time of the early Ming dynasty, great edict was used by Hongwu Emperor for his official documents of imperial laws and thus became a symbol of power and authority of the Ming emperor. For this reason, there was an opinion that Nguyễn Trãi named his announcement đại cáo for the purpose of reversing the meaning of great edict from the symbol of Ming emperor to the representation of Đại Việt victory over his very own army.

== Background ==
Although we have been at time strong, at time weak.
We have at no time lacked heroes.

— Nguyễn Trãi, Bình Ngô đại cáo

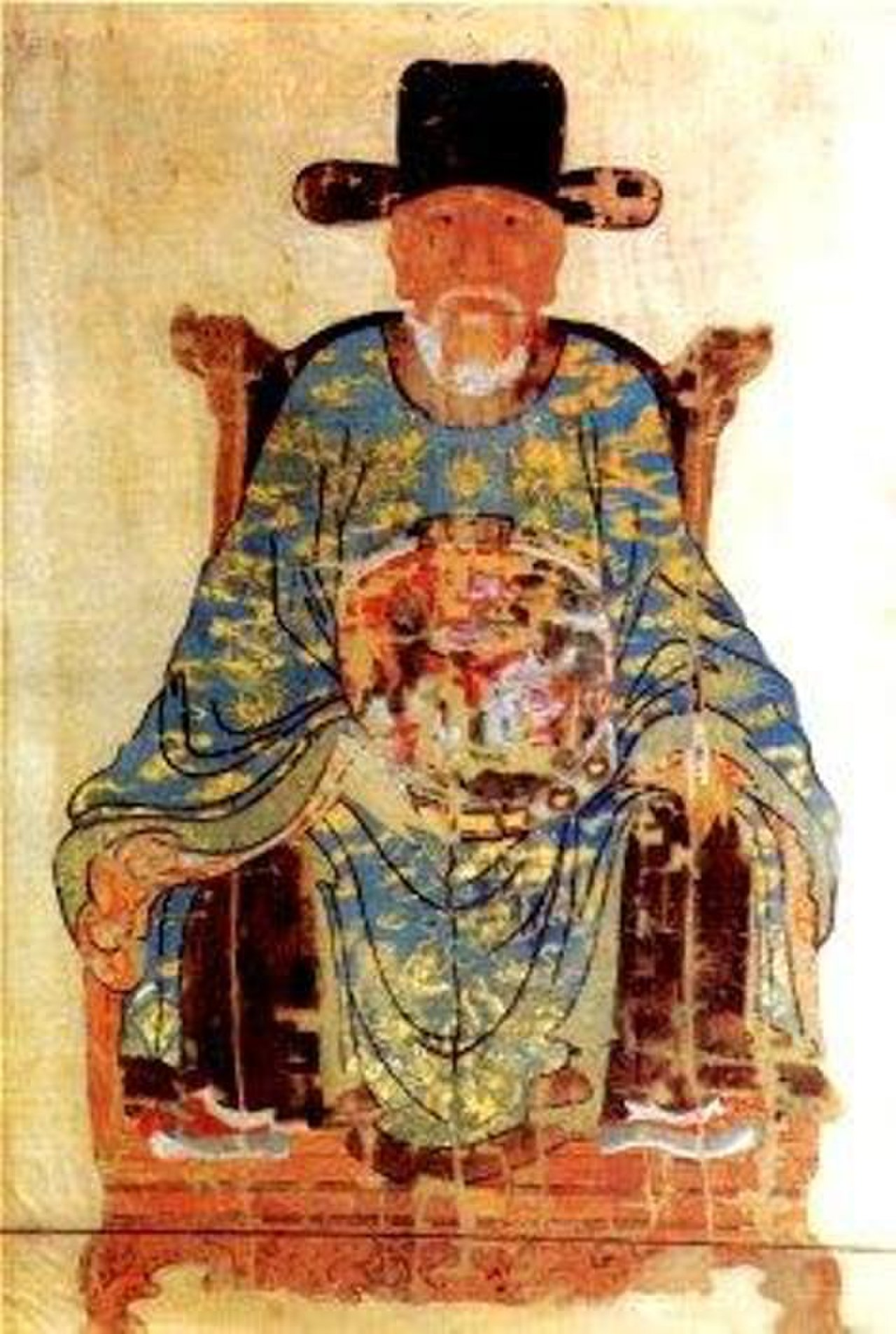
The silk painting of Nguyễn Trãi (15th century)

In 1427, Lê Lợi led the Lam Sơn uprising to the ultimate victory over the Ming imperialists and ended the Fourth Chinese domination in Vietnam. As a result, in 1428 Lê Lợi ordered Nguyễn Trãi to write an announcement for people in the country about the total pacification of the Ming imperialists and the affirmation of the independence of Đại Việt. From that demand, Nguyễn Trãi wrote Bình Ngô đại cáo which not only proclaimed the independence of the country but also claimed the equality of Đại Việt with China during the long history and expressed many own ideas of Nguyễn Trãi about the fairness, the role of people in history of the country and the way to win a war of independence. Besides, Nguyễn Trãi used Bình Ngô đại cáo to prove the just cause of the Lam Sơn uprising and why Lê Lợi's army could drive out the Ming imperialists with its policies of relying on people to fight against the invaders. After it was announced, the proclamation was considered a success, while Nguyễn Trãi became one of the most crucial figures of the royal court after the coronation of Lê Lợi, now Lê Thái Tổ. However, Nguyễn Trãi was finally executed in 1442 during the political struggle in the royal court and royal family of the early Lê dynasty. The earliest version of Bình Ngô đại cáo that remains today was found in the 1697 edition of the Đại Việt sử ký toàn thư which was compiled by Ngô Sĩ Liên.

== Content ==
Bình Ngô đại cáo is an edict-like (Vietnamese: cáo) announcement written in the literary form of parallel constructions (văn biền ngẫu). The proclamation was divided in four parts:

- The first part demonstrated the history of Đại Việt with its identity and tradition of fighting against Chinese dynasties for the purpose of independence and equal position as China.
- The second part denounced the heinous crimes of the Ming imperialists during their domination in Đại Việt when they enslaved the people and deprived resources of the country.
- The third part narrated the Lam Sơn uprising from the difficult beginning to the final victories.
- The fourth part summarized the lesson from history and reaffirmed that righteousness would win.

Originally, Bình Ngô đại cáo was written in chữ Hán, it was translated into Vietnamese by several scholars such as Ngô Tất Tố, Bùi Kỷ or Trần Trọng Kim, the translated version by Trần Trọng Kim in his Việt Nam sử lược and the revised version by Bùi Kỷ are considered the more popular and included in the schoolbook in Vietnam.

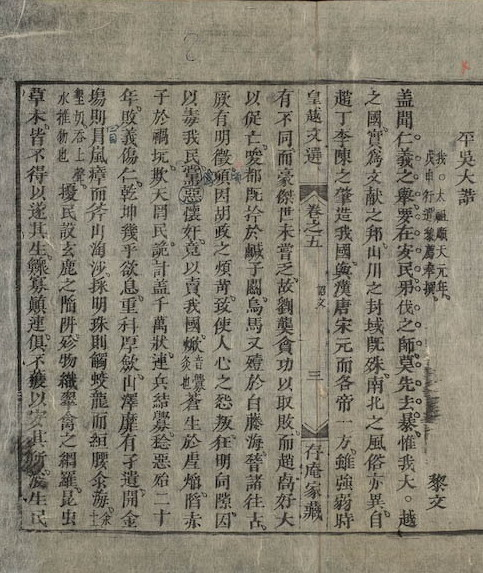
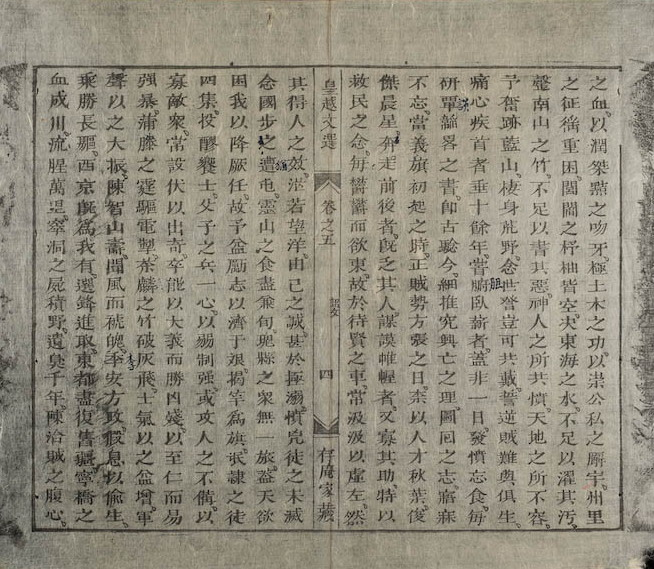
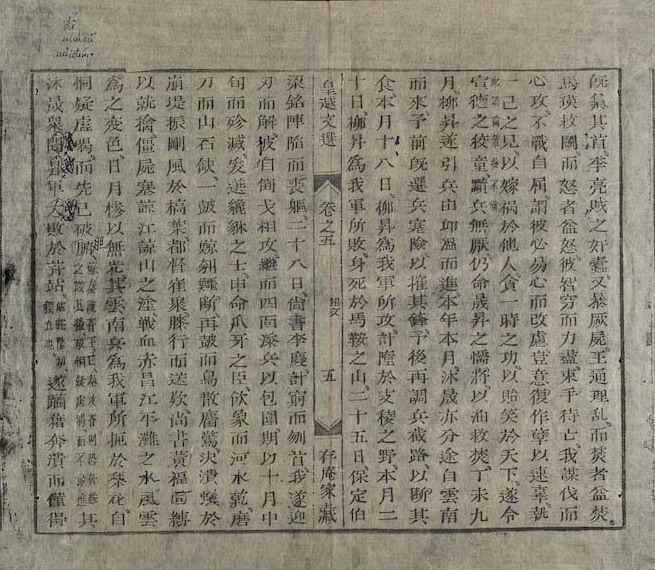
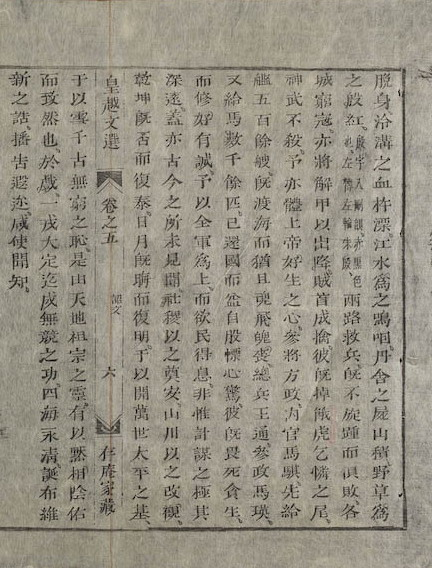
Bình Ngô đại cáo in chữ Hán (read from right to left), collected into Hoàng Việt văn tuyển which was published in 1825.

== Significance ==
It was said: To ensure peace for the people, such is the essence of humanity and justice. To eliminate violence, such is the primary aim of our soldiers.

— Nguyễn Trãi, Bình Ngô đại cáo

Bình Ngô đại cáo is considered the second declaration of independence of Vietnam after the poem Nam quốc sơn hà which was attributed to Lý Thường Kiệt in the early Lý dynasty. The proclamation is highly appreciated not only for its value of propaganda and history but also for its fine literary quality which is praised as the "Incomparably powerful writing document" (Thiên cổ hùng văn) in the History of Vietnam. With Bình Ngô đại cáo, Nguyễn Trãi asserted the obvious independence and equal status of Vietnam with China and more importantly, reckoned that independence could be achieved only when the rulers had concern for their people and made decision for the interest of the masses. Today, Bình Ngô đại cáo is taught in both secondary (grades 6–9) and high school (grades 10–12) in Vietnam.

== Different perspectives ==
The historian Professor Liam Kelley of the University of Hawaiʻi at Mānoa on his Le Minh Khai's SEAsian History Blog suggested that the "north" referred to the Ming collaborationist Hanoi scholars while the south referred to Thanh Hóa, the base of Lê Lợi since the text referred to "Dai Viet" and did not introduce China before mentioning north. cited John Whitmore and challenged the claim that "Ngô" referred to Ming dynasty China but instead referred to the Chinese settled Red River Delta area of Vietnam. It was English and French foreign languages translations which bowdlerised "south" into "Vietnam" and "north" into China even though people today have no true idea of what south and north referred to in the original text. He believes that it was the Ming collaborationist scholars of Hanoi who were referred to as the "Ngô" and that it was not a term used for Chinese as is currently thought in Vietnam, and that the Bình Ngô đại cáo was not directed at China. In the 20th century for propaganda purposes against French colonialism, the development of the new genre of "resistance literature" spurred a change in how the "Bình Ngô đại cáo" was looked at. Kelley suggested that the "Bình Ngô đại cáo" drew on a previous Ming text. In June 2014 historian Lê Việt Anh criticised these views of Liam Kelley in an article published by Nhân Dân, the official newspaper of the Communist Party of Vietnam; Lê stated that Kelley's findings were a "bizarre explanation" (Note: Original Vietnamese: lý giải một cách kỳ quái) with no basis in the text, and referred to Kelley as a "Temple burner" (Note: Original Vietnamese: kẻ/người "đốt đền").

== Bibliography ==
- National Bureau for Historical Record (1998), Khâm định Việt sử Thông giám cương mục (in Vietnamese), Hanoi: Education Publishing House
- Chapuis, Oscar (1995), A history of Vietnam: from Hong Bang to Tu Duc, Greenwood Publishing Group, ISBN 0-313-29622-7
- Ngô Sĩ Liên (1993), Đại Việt sử ký toàn thư (in Vietnamese) (Nội các quan bản ed.), Hanoi: Social Science Publishing House
- Trần Trọng Kim (1971), Việt Nam sử lược (in Vietnamese), Saigon: Center for School Materials
- Tham Seong Chee (1981), Essays on Literature and Society in Southeast Asia: Political and Sociological, NUS Press, ISBN 9971-69-036-5
