= Quỳ Châu =

- Commune
- Interactive map of Quỳ Châu
- Coordinates: 19°35′10″N 105°09′30″E
- Country: Vietnam
- Province: Nghệ An
- Established: 14 June 1990: Quỳ Châu township; 12 May 2010: Tân Lạc township; 16 June 2025: Quỳ Châu commune

Area
  - Total: 327.53 km^{2} (126.46 sq mi)

Population (31 December 2024)
  - Total: 23,094
  - Density: 70/km^{2} (180/sq mi)

Quỳ Châu is a commune of Nghệ An Province, Vietnam. It is one of the 130 new wards, communes and special zones of the province following the reorganization in 2025.

Quỳ Châu commune was established under Resolution No. 1678/NQ-UBTVQH15 of the Standing Committee of the National Assembly of Vietnam, issued on 16 June 2025. Accordingly, the entire natural area and population of Tân Lạc township and the communes of Châu Hạnh, Châu Hội, and Châu Nga in Quỳ Châu district were merged to form a new commune named Quỳ Châu commune.
