= Quỳ Châu district =

Coordinates: 19.500°N 105.083°E

Quỳ Châu District Huyện Quỳ Châu
- District
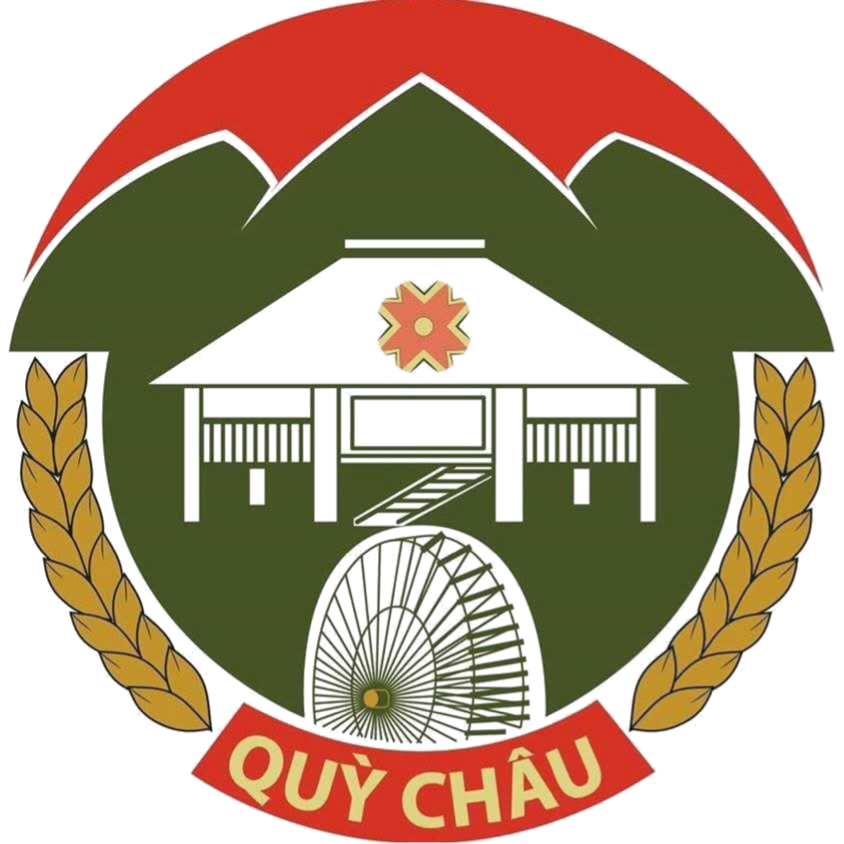
- Seal
- Interactive map of Quỳ Châu District
- Country: Vietnam
- Region: North Central Coast
- Province: Nghệ An
- Capital: Tân Lạc

Area
  - Total: 415 sq mi (1,074 km^{2})

Population (2003)
  - Total: 52,403
- Time zone: UTC+07:00 (Indochina Time)

Quỳ Châu is a former rural district of Nghệ An province in the North Central Coast region of Vietnam.

== Subdivisions ==
Quỳ Châu has one town and 11 townships or communes (xã).

1. Tân Lạc (formerly named Quỳ Châu)
2. Châu Bính
3. Châu Thuận
4. Châu Hội
5. Châu Nga
6. Châu Tiến
7. Châu Hạnh
8. Châu Thắng
9. Châu Phong
10. Châu Bình
11. Châu Hoàn
12. Diễn Lâm

== Climate ==
Climate data for Quỳ Châu
Month	Jan	Feb	Mar	Apr	May	Jun	Jul	Aug	Sep	Oct	Nov	Dec	Year
Record high °C (°F)	36.3 (97.3)	38.0 (100.4)	39.8 (103.6)	42.0 (107.6)	43.2 (109.8)	41.5 (106.7)	41.0 (105.8)	39.7 (103.5)	37.9 (100.2)	36.3 (97.3)	36.5 (97.7)	32.8 (91.0)	43.2 (109.8)
Mean daily maximum °C (°F)	21.9 (71.4)	23.1 (73.6)	26.1 (79.0)	30.8 (87.4)	33.6 (92.5)	34.1 (93.4)	34.1 (93.4)	32.9 (91.2)	31.4 (88.5)	29.1 (84.4)	26.2 (79.2)	23.1 (73.6)	28.9 (84.0)
Daily mean °C (°F)	17.2 (63.0)	18.6 (65.5)	21.2 (70.2)	24.9 (76.8)	27.2 (81.0)	28.1 (82.6)	28.1 (82.6)	27.4 (81.3)	26.3 (79.3)	24.0 (75.2)	21.1 (70.0)	17.9 (64.2)	23.5 (74.3)
Mean daily minimum °C (°F)	14.4 (57.9)	15.8 (60.4)	18.2 (64.8)	21.2 (70.2)	23.3 (73.9)	24.5 (76.1)	24.5 (76.1)	24.3 (75.7)	23.3 (73.9)	21.0 (69.8)	18.0 (64.4)	14.8 (58.6)	20.3 (68.5)
Record low °C (°F)	0.5 (32.9)	4.8 (40.6)	4.2 (39.6)	12.0 (53.6)	15.9 (60.6)	18.5 (65.3)	20.9 (69.6)	20.7 (69.3)	15.5 (59.9)	10.6 (51.1)	4.6 (40.3)	0.4 (32.7)	0.4 (32.7)
Average precipitation mm (inches)	19.4 (0.76)	13.8 (0.54)	29.8 (1.17)	83.3 (3.28)	221.8 (8.73)	200.6 (7.90)	208.7 (8.22)	288.5 (11.36)	316.6 (12.46)	221.0 (8.70)	55.8 (2.20)	19.5 (0.77)	1,680.4 (66.16)
Average rainy days	8.4	8.2	9.7	12.1	16.8	15.6	16.1	19.8	15.6	12.6	8.5	6.4	150.5
Average relative humidity (%)	87.4	86.9	86.0	84.4	83.3	84.2	84.3	87.3	87.7	87.6	87.2	86.8	86.1
Mean monthly sunshine hours	80.3	64.9	80.0	128.5	186.9	165.4	178.8	154.3	150.6	138.8	117.3	104.5	1,549.2
Source: Vietnam Institute for Building Science and Technology
