= Trần Anh Tông =

Trần Anh Tông 陳英宗
- Emperor of Đại Việt
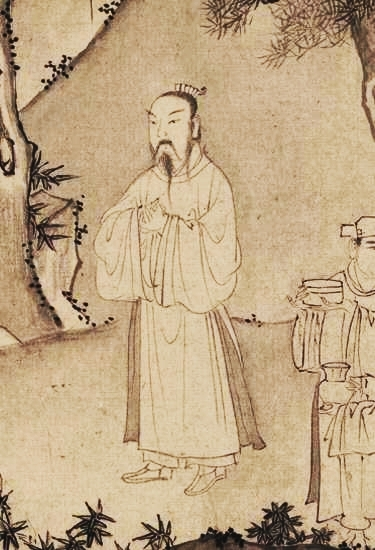

Emperor of Trần dynasty
- Reign: 1293–1314
- Predecessor: Trần Nhân Tông
- Successor: Trần Minh Tông

Retired Emperor of Trần dynasty
- Reign: 1314–1320
- Predecessor: Trần Nhân Tông
- Successor: Trần Minh Tông
- Born: 17 September 1276; Thăng Long, Đại Việt
- Died: 12 December 1320 (aged 44); Thăng Long, Đại Việt
- Burial: Thái Tomb
- Spouse: Empress Thuận Thánh
- Issue: Crown prince Trần Mạnh and 5 daughters
Names
- Trần Thuyên (陳烇)
Era dates
- Hưng Long (興隆, 1293–1314)
Regnal name
- Ứng Thiên Quảng Vận Nhân Minh Thánh Hiếu hoàng đế (應天廣運仁明聖孝皇帝)
Posthumous name
- Ứng Thiên Quảng Vận Hiển Văn Duệ Vũ Khâm Minh Nhân Hiếu hoàng đế 應天廣運顯文睿武欽明仁孝皇帝
Temple name
- Anh Tông (英宗)
- House: Trần dynasty
- Father: Trần Nhân Tông
- Mother: Empress Khâm Từ Bảo Thánh
- Religion: Buddhism

Trần Anh Tông (chữ Hán: 陳英宗, 17 September 1276 – 12 December 1320), personal name Trần Thuyên (陳烇), courtesy name Nhật Sủy (日煃) or Nhật Sáng (日㷃/日𤊞), was the fourth emperor of the Trần dynasty, reigning over Dai Viet from 1293 to 1314. After ceding the throne to his son Trần Minh Tông, Anh Tông held the title Retired Emperor for six years. As the first Trần emperor who ruled in total peace with respect to foreign affairs, Anh Tông was known for his successful reign of Đại Việt, which brought a long period of peace and prosperity over the country. He also had several military victories over the kingdoms of Champa and Lan Xang.

== Early years ==
Anh Tông was born in 1276 as Trần Thuyên, the first son of the then-emperor Trần Nhân Tông and Empress Khâm Từ Bảo Thánh. In 1292 he was invested as crown prince by Nhân Tông and ultimately was ceded the throne in 1293 while his father still reigned as Retired Emperor (Thái thượng hoàng) for 16 years.

According to officially commissioned historical books, although being an intelligent ruler and a devoted son, the young Emperor Anh Tông often drank alcohol and escaped from the royal citadel to wander around Thăng Long at night. One time the Emperor was so drunk that he forgot to welcome the Retired Emperor who was coming back from Thiên Trường for a visit. When he was made aware of the situation, Nhân Tông departed immediately in a fury from Thăng Long and Anh Tông had to write a petition for the Retired Emperor with the help from a young scholar named Đoàn Nhữ Hài. After that event, Anh Tông appointed Đoàn as court counselor and avoided drinking.

== As emperor ==
Trần Anh Tông

Vietnamese name
- Vietnamese: Trần Anh Tông
- Hán-Nôm: 陳英宗

Anh Tông was the first Trần emperor who reigned without having to face attacks from the Mongol Empire. Despite the deaths of the two most important generals of the early Trần dynasty, Trần Quang Khải in 1294 and Trần Quốc Tuấn in 1300, the Emperor was still served by many efficient mandarins like Trần Nhật Duật, Đoàn Nhữ Hài, Phạm Ngũ Lão, Trương Hán Siêu, Mạc Đĩnh Chi and Nguyễn Trung Ngạn. Anh Tông was very strict in suppressing gambling and corruption but he also generously rewarded those who served him well. Under the reign of an able emperor and capable court administration, Đại Việt witnessed a long period of peace and prosperity.

- Birth name
- Vietnamese alphabet: Trần Thuyên
- Hán-Nôm: 陳烇

Foreign policy during Anh Tông's reign was continuing the détente with the Yuan dynasty while restraining the two other neighbours of Đại Việt, the kingdoms of Champa and Laos. The Emperor's envoy to the Yuan dynasty was so successful that the leader Mạc Đĩnh Chi was dubbled the "Two-state exemplar" because he came first as Trạng nguyên (Zhuangyuan, 狀元) in Đại Việt's imperial examination and was praised in the Yuan dynasty court for his eloquence. After the failed invasions of the Mongol Empire, Đại Việt's southwestern border was invaded several times by Laos until Anh Tông appointed Phạm Ngũ Lão to oversee the pacification of the frontier regions.

In 1306, the king of Champa Chế Mân offered Vietnam two Cham prefectures Ô and Lý in exchange for a marriage with Vietnamese princess Huyền Trân. Anh Tông accepted this offer, then he took and renamed Ô prefecture and Lý prefecture to Thuận prefecture and Hóa prefecture, both of them often referred shortly as Thuận Hóa region. Only one year into the marriage, Chế Mân died and in line with the royal tradition of Champa, Huyền Trân was to be cremated with her husband. Facing this urgent condition, Anh Tông sent his mandarin Trần Khắc Chung to Champa to save Huyền Trân from an imminent death. Finally Huyền Trân was able to return to Đại Việt but Chế Chí, the successor of Chế Mân, no longer wished to abide by the peace treaty with Đại Việt. After that event, Anh Tông himself, along with generals Trần Quốc Chân and Trần Khánh Dư commanded three groups of Đại Việt military units to attack Champa in 1312. Chế Chí was defeated and captured in this invasion, and Anh Tông installed a hand-picked successor, Che Man's brother Che Da-a-ba-niem, but the relations between Đại Việt and Champa remained strained for a long time afterwards.

== As retired emperor ==
After 21 years of rule, Anh Tông passed the throne to the crown prince Trần Mạnh, who became the Emperor Trần Minh Tông, and Anh Tông retained the title Thái thượng hoàng for six more years before dying in 1320 at the age of 54. Anh Tông had only one era name during his reign, which was Hưng Long (興隆, prosperity). After the Emperor's death, he was given the posthumous name Hiển văn duệ vũ khâm minh nhân hiếu hoàng đế (顯文睿武欽明仁孝皇帝).

According to history books, Anh Tông was praised for his righteous reign, which created a peaceful and prosperous period in the history of Đại Việt. He was known as a modest ruler who was quick to mend his mistakes, was always cautious and intelligent in judgment, and the only major criticism of him was building a tower and gathering monks in Yên Tử mountain. According to the royal historian Ngô Sĩ Liên, Anh Tông was a father with sense of responsibility for his son, which is seen as an important factor in Minh Tông's good governance in the future. The decision made by Anh Tông and his father Nhân Tông to marry off the royal princess Huyền Trân to the king of Champa in exchange for peace and land was sometimes considered a stigma on the Trần dynasty.

== Family ==
- Anh Tông had one empress, two other wives and several concubines:
  - Empress Thuận Thánh (?–1330), daughter of Trần Quốc Tảng and granddaughter of Trần Quốc Tuấn. She was entitled Queen dowager when Trần Mạnh was made emperor
  - Imperial consort Chiêu Hiến, daughter of Trần Bình Trọng, natural mother of Trần Mạnh
  - Imperial consort Tĩnh Huệ, daughter of Phạm Ngũ Lão
  - Đa La Thanh, daughter of northern monk Du Chi Bà Lam
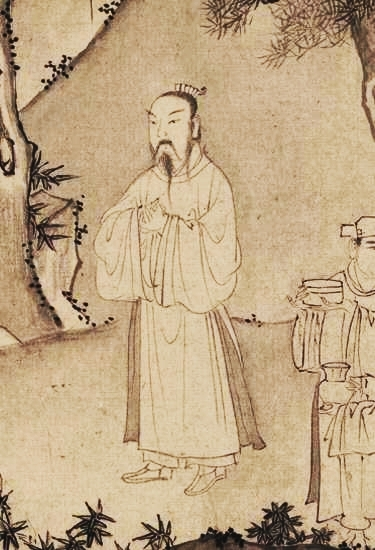
    Emperor Trần Anh Tông
  - Imperial concubine Trần Thị Thái Bình
  - Palace maid Vương Thị
- Besides three short-lived sons, Anh Tông was survived by only one son, Trần Mạnh, who eventually became his successor Trần Minh Tông. The Emperor also had five daughters:
  - Princess Thiên Chân
  - Princess Ý Trinh
  - Princess Huy Chân
  - Princess Huệ Chân
  - Princess Thánh Chân

== Sources ==
- Ngô, Sỹ Liên (1993), Đại Việt sử ký toàn thư (in Vietnamese) (Nội các quan bản ed.), Hanoi: Social Science Publishing House
- National Bureau for Historical Record (1998), Khâm định Việt sử Thông giám cương mục (in Vietnamese), Hanoi: Education Publishing House
- Trần, Trọng Kim (1971), Việt Nam sử lược (in Vietnamese), Saigon: Center for School Materials
- Tran Tuyet Nhung, Anthony Reid (2006), Việt Nam: borderless histories, Univ of Wisconsin Press, ISBN 0-299-21774-4
- Chapuis, Oscar (1995), A history of Vietnam: from Hong Bang to Tu Duc, Greenwood Publishing Group, ISBN 0-313-29622-7

Trần Anh Tông House of Trần Born: 1276 Died: 1320
Regnal titles
Preceded by Trần Nhân Tông	Emperor of Trần dynasty 1293–1314	Succeeded by Trần Minh Tông
Preceded by Trần Nhân Tông	Retired Emperor of Trần dynasty 1314–1320	Succeeded by Trần Minh Tông

Trần imperial family

Colour note	Emperor, Empress Regnant, Retired Emperor	Prince	Princess

Trần Kinh
Trần Hấp
Trần Lý	Trần Hoằng Nghi
Trần Tự Khánh	Trần Thừa	Lý Huệ Tông	Trần Thị Dung	Trần Thủ Độ
Princess Thuận Thiên
Trần Liễu	Trần Thái Tông
Princess Chiêu Thánh	Lê Phụ Trần
Tuệ Trung	Trần Hưng Đạo	Trần Quốc Khang	Trần Thánh Tông	Trần Ích Tắc	Trần Quang Khải	Trần Nhật Duật
Phạm Ngũ Lão	Princess Anh Nguyên	Trần Quốc Tảng	Trần Nhân Tông	Trần Khánh Dư	Trần Đạo Tái	Princess An Tư
Princess Huyền Trân	Trần Quốc Chẩn	Trần Anh Tông	Trần Văn Bích	Princess Thụy Bảo
Trần Minh Tông	Trần Nguyên Đán	Trần Bình Trọng
Prince Cung Túc	Trần Hiến Tông	Trần Dụ Tông	Trần Nghệ Tông	Trần Duệ Tông	Trần Thị Thái	Nguyễn Phi Khanh
Dương Nhật Lễ	Prince Trang Định	Giản Định Đế	Trần Thuận Tông	Trần Phế Đế	Nguyễn Trãi
Trùng Quang Đế	Trần Thiếu Đế

Notes:
- Ngô Sĩ Liên (1993), Đại Việt sử ký toàn thư (in Vietnamese) (Nội các quan bản ed.), Hanoi: Social Science Publishing House
- National Bureau for Historical Record (1998), Khâm định Việt sử Thông giám cương mục (in Vietnamese), Hanoi: Education Publishing House
- Trần Trọng Kim (1971), Việt Nam sử lược (in Vietnamese), Saigon: Center for School Materials
- Chapuis, Oscar (1995), A history of Vietnam: from Hong Bang to Tu Duc, Greenwood Publishing Group, ISBN 0313296227

Family tree of Vietnamese monarchs
