= Trần Ích Tắc =

- Prince Chiêu Quốc (stripped)
- Born: 1254; Thăng Long, Đại Việt
- Died: 1329 (aged 74–75); Hangzhou, Yuan China
- Issue: Trần Bá Cốc
Posthumous name
- Trung Ý vương
- House: Trần dynasty
- Father: Trần Thái Tông

Trần Ích Tắc (chữ Hán: 陳益稷, Chen Yiji, 1254–1329), or Prince Chiêu Quốc (Vietnamese: Chiêu Quốc vương / 昭國王), was a prince of Đại Việt, the fifth son of emperor Trần Thái Tông of the Trần dynasty, and the younger brother of the Emperor Trần Thánh Tông and grand chancellor Trần Quang Khải.

Before the invasion of Vietnam by the Yuan dynasty, Trần Ích Tắc was the most famous prince of Trần Thái Tông, known for his intelligence and broad knowledge. The mansion of Prince Chiêu Quốc in Thăng Long was also a renowned school of the capital. In the beginning of the Yuan-Tran war, Trần Ích Tắc surrendered to Kublai Khan's prince Toghan and thus became the highest-ranking official of the Trần dynasty to do so. However, later the Tran dynasty was ultimately able to defeat the Yuan invasion, partly because of the Tran dynasty's proficiency in gunpowder. The Tran and Yuan later restored diplomatic and trade relations, and Tran Ich Tac's name was restored over time—as a diplomat who solidified Tran-Yuan relations.

The Yuan dynasty supported Trần Ích Tắc to become king of Annam but were unable to, so he continued to live in Ezhou, Hubei, China, where he lived the rest of his days.

According to official Vietnamese records and Ngô Sĩ Liên, the Chinese leader Chen Youliang (陈友谅；Trần Hữu Lượng), founder of Chen Han in China, was the son of Trần Ích Tắc.

== Biography ==
Trần Ích Tắc was born in 1254 as the fifth son of the Emperor Trần Thái Tông, he was entitled Prince Chiêu Quốc in May 1268. Besides his elder brother the Emperor Trần Thánh Tông, Prince Chiêu Quốc had two other famous brothers who were grand chancellor Prince Chiêu Minh (Chiêu Minh Vương) Trần Quang Khải and Prince Chiêu Văn (Chiêu Văn Vương) Trần Nhật Duật, both Trần Quang Khải and Trần Nhật Duật were important generals of the Trần dynasty during the second Mongol invasion of Đại Việt. Although Trần Quang Khải was a famous poet and Trần Nhật Duật was well known for his knowledge, the most famous son of the Retired Emperor Thái Tông before the war was Trần Ích Tắc. It was said that Prince Chiêu Quốc was not only intelligent but also fond of learning; besides a broad knowledge of history, art, literature, Trần Ích Tắc was also a skilled player of cuju and xiangqi. The palace of Prince Chiêu Quốc in Thăng Long was renowned as a school in the capital where educated many scholars including some future prominent officials of the Trần dynasty such as Mạc Đĩnh Chi or Bùi Phóng.

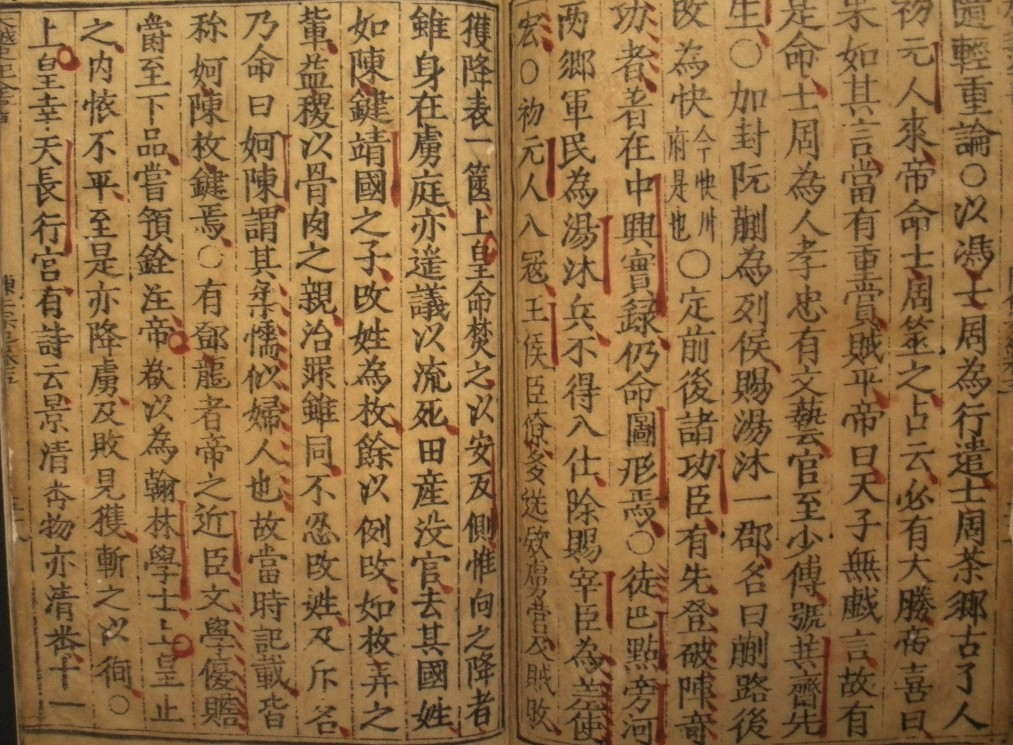
A record of Vietnam for blaming the surrender of Prince Trần Ích Tắc, calling him "a womanly coward"

In 1279, the Mongol-led Yuan dynasty won the decisive victory over the Song dynasty in the Battle of Yamen, marking the end of the Song dynasty and the total control of Kublai Khan over China. As a result, Kublai Khan began to return his attention to southern countries like Đại Việt or Champa. In December 1284, the second Yuan invasion of Đại Việt was launched under the command of Kublai Khan's son prince Toghan. Đại Việt was attacked in two directions. Toghan himself conducted the infantry across the northern border while the Yuan navy under general Sogetu advanced from the south through Champa's territory.

In order to avoid the pressure of Yuan's force, the Retired Emperor Thánh Tông and the Emperor Nhân Tông decided to retreat from Thăng Long to Thanh Hóa on March 1 of Lunar calendar 1285. In the same month, Prince Chiêu Quốc Trần Ích Tắc, Marquis Văn Chiêu (Văn Chiêu hầu) Trần Lộng and several officials of the Trần dynasty surrendered to prince Toghan. According to Đại Việt sử kí toàn thư, Thái Tông presaged the defection to the north of Trần Ích Tắc before his birth. Trần Ích Tắc also soon revealed his purpose of fighting his elder brother for the throne even by foreign intervention. Therefore, on this occasion, Prince Chiêu Quốc decided to defect to the Yuan side with the hope that they would help him take the position of Emperor of Đại Việt. The defection of Trần Ích Tắc and several high-ranking official of Trần royal court did have an adverse impact for the Trần dynasty in the beginning of the war of resistance, but Trần clan and royal court were still united by the effort of the Retired Emperor, the Emperor and other important figures like Trần Hưng Đạo, Trần Quang Khải, Trần Nhật Duật. The harmony of them was one of the main factors that led to the victory of the Trần dynasty over the Mongols' second invasion.

Right after the failed attempt in 1285, the Yuan dynasty began to prepare for the third major campaign against Đại Việt with the pretext of helping Trần Ích Tắc return as king of Annam. Their 1287 campaign was eventually ended by the Battle of Bạch Đằng on March 8 of Lunar calendar 1288, where the Yuan navy was almost destroyed by the troops of Trần Hưng Đạo. In 1289, the Trần Emperor issued an order in which the family name of every defected member of Trần clan was changed to Mai (枚), for example Trần Lộng (陳弄) was renamed as Mai Lộng (枚弄). Being the only defected prince of Trần clan, Trần Ích Tắc was exempted from this order but he was called in historical accounts of the Trần dynasty by the name "Ả Trần", literally meant "the woman named Trần" to sarcastically criticize Ích Tắc "was as coward as a woman".

After the defeat of the Yuan dynasty in their third invasion of Đại Việt, Trần Ích Tắc continued his life in Ezhou, Hubei, and often appeared in provincial authority when Đại Việt ambassador went to China. Once he met the ambassador Nguyễn Đại Phạp (阮代乏) who was once a scribe in the palace of Trần Ích Tắc's brother, Prince Chiêu Đạo (Chiêu Đạo vương / 昭道王). When Trần Ích Tắc showed his scorn about the profession of Nguyễn Đại Phạp in the past, the ambassador of Đại Việt said: "Things changed. Đại Phạp, once a mere scribe for Prince Chiêu Đạo, now became an ambassador, just like the Mandarin [Ích Tắc], once a prince of the Emperor, now became a defector" ("Việc đời đổi thay, Đại Phạp trước vốn là tên biên chép cho Chiêu Đạo vương, nay là sứ giả, cũng như Bình chương xưa kia là con vua, nay lại là người đầu hàng giặc"). It seemed that Trần Ích Tắc felt ashamed after that event and he did not appear anymore when Đại Việt ambassador was there. He died in 1329 in foreign soil far from his homeland.

In 1354 Chen Youliang, the founder of the rebel Chen Han regime in the late Yuan dynasty tried to mobilise support from Đại Việt. However, the Emperor Trần Dụ Tông refused to help him because the Trần dynasty needed to concentrate their force in the southern border against Champa. In the account about this event, Ngô Sĩ Liên claimed that the Chinese leader Chen Youliang (陈友谅；Vietnamese: Trần Hữu Lượng), founder of Chen Han in China, was the son of Trần Ích Tắc.

== Works ==
- Củng cực lạc ngâm tập (拱極樂吟集)

== Reading ==
- Ngô Sĩ Liên (1993), Đại Việt sử ký toàn thư (in Vietnamese) (Nội các quan bản ed.), Hanoi: Social Science Publishing House
- National Bureau for Historical Record (1998), Khâm định Việt sử Thông giám cương mục (in Vietnamese), Hanoi: Education Publishing House
- Trần Trọng Kim (1971), Việt Nam sử lược (in Vietnamese), Saigon: Center for School Materials
- Chapuis, Oscar (1995), A history of Vietnam: from Hong Bang to Tu Duc, Greenwood Publishing Group, ISBN 0-313-29622-7

Trần imperial family

Colour note	Emperor, Empress Regnant, Retired Emperor	Prince	Princess

Trần Kinh
Trần Hấp
Trần Lý	Trần Hoằng Nghi
Trần Tự Khánh	Trần Thừa	Lý Huệ Tông	Trần Thị Dung	Trần Thủ Độ
Princess Thuận Thiên
Trần Liễu	Trần Thái Tông
Princess Chiêu Thánh	Lê Phụ Trần
Tuệ Trung	Trần Hưng Đạo	Trần Quốc Khang	Trần Thánh Tông	Trần Ích Tắc	Trần Quang Khải	Trần Nhật Duật
Phạm Ngũ Lão	Princess Anh Nguyên	Trần Quốc Tảng	Trần Nhân Tông	Trần Khánh Dư	Trần Đạo Tái	Princess An Tư
Princess Huyền Trân	Trần Quốc Chẩn	Trần Anh Tông	Trần Văn Bích	Princess Thụy Bảo
Trần Minh Tông	Trần Nguyên Đán	Trần Bình Trọng
Prince Cung Túc	Trần Hiến Tông	Trần Dụ Tông	Trần Nghệ Tông	Trần Duệ Tông	Trần Thị Thái	Nguyễn Phi Khanh
Dương Nhật Lễ	Prince Trang Định	Giản Định Đế	Trần Thuận Tông	Trần Phế Đế	Nguyễn Trãi
Trùng Quang Đế	Trần Thiếu Đế

Notes:
- Ngô Sĩ Liên (1993), Đại Việt sử ký toàn thư (in Vietnamese) (Nội các quan bản ed.), Hanoi: Social Science Publishing House
- National Bureau for Historical Record (1998), Khâm định Việt sử Thông giám cương mục (in Vietnamese), Hanoi: Education Publishing House
- Trần Trọng Kim (1971), Việt Nam sử lược (in Vietnamese), Saigon: Center for School Materials
- Chapuis, Oscar (1995), A history of Vietnam: from Hong Bang to Tu Duc, Greenwood Publishing Group, ISBN 0313296227

Family tree of Vietnamese monarchs
