= Empress dowager =

Mother or widow of an emperor

Empress dowager (also dowager empress or empress mother; Chinese and Japanese: 皇太后; pinyin: huángtàihòu; rōmaji: Kōtaigō; Korean: 황태후 (皇太后); romaja: Hwang Tae Hu; Vietnamese: Hoàng Thái Hậu (皇太后)) is the English language translation of the title given to the mother or widow of a monarch, especially in regard to Chinese, Japanese, Korean, or Vietnamese monarchs in the Chinese cultural sphere. The term, however, is applied well beyond just East Asia.

The title was also given occasionally to another woman of the same generation, while a woman from the previous generation was sometimes given the title of grand empress dowager (Chinese and Japanese: 太皇太后; pinyin: tàihúangtàihòu; rōmaji: Taikōtaigō; Korean: 태황태후 (太皇太后); romaja: Tae Hwang Tae Hu; Vietnamese: Thái Hoàng Thái Hậu (太皇太后)). An empress dowager wielded power over the harem and imperial family. Numerous empress dowagers held regency during the reign of underage emperors. Many of the most prominent empress dowagers also extended their control for long periods after the emperor was old enough to govern. This was a source of political turmoil according to the traditional view of Chinese history.

In Europe, the title dowager empress was given to the wife of a deceased Emperor of Russia or Holy Roman Emperor.

== By country ==
For grand empresses dowager, visit grand empress dowager.

=== East Asia ===
==== Chinese empresses dowager ====
Han dynasty

- Empress Dowager Lü (241–180 BC), empress consort of Emperor Gaozu of Han (256-195 BC, r. 202-195 BC)
- Empress Dowager Dou
- Empress Dowager Wang
- Empress Dowager Deng
- Empress Dowager Liang (116–150), empress to Emperor Shun of Han (115–144, r. 125–144)
- Empress Dowager He (d. 189), second empress consort of Emperor Ling of Han (156–189, r. 168–189)

Jin dynasty

- Empress Wenming (217–268), wife of Sima Zhao (211–265)
- Yang Zhi, second empress of Emperor Wu of Jin
- Yu Wenjun, wife of Emperor Ming of Jin
- Chu Suanzi, wife of Emperor Kang of Jin

Northern Wei dynasty

- Empress Dowager Feng, empress consort of Emperor Wencheng of Northern Wei (440–465, r. 452–465)
- Empress Dowager Hu, (d. 528), concubine of Emperor Xuanwu (483–515, r. 499–515)

Liu Song dynasty

- Empress Dowager Xiao Wenshou (343–423), stepmother of Emperor Wu of Liu Song (363–422, r. 420–422)

Tang dynasty

- Empress Dowager Wu, more commonly known as Wu Zetian
- Empress Dowager Xiao
- Empress Dowager He

Liao dynasty

- Empress Dowager Xiao (d. 951?), concubine of Yelü Bei
- Empress Dowager Chengtian
- Empress Dowager Xiao Noujin (980–1057), concubine of Emperor Shengzong

Song dynasty

- Empress Dowager Xie (1210–1283), empress consort of Emperor Lizong of Song

Yuan dynasty

- Empress Gi (1315–1369), one of the primary empresses of Toghon Temur

Qing dynasty

- Empress Dowager Xiaoduanwen (1599–1649), consort of Hong Taiji (1592–1643), second Khan of the Later Jin dynasty (r. 1626–1636) and first Emperor of the Qin dynasty (r. 1636–1643)
- Empress Dowager Xiaozhuang (1613–1688), consort of Hong Taiji
- Empress Dowager Renxian (1641–1718)
- Empress Dowager Cihe
- Empress Dowager Chongqing
- Empress Dowager Ci'an
- Empress Dowager Cixi, de facto ruler of the Qing dynasty for 40 years
- Empress Dowager Longyu (1868–1913), wife and empress consort of Zaitian, the Guangxu Emperor, abdicated on behalf of Puyi

==== Japanese empress dowager ====
Standard of the Japanese Empress Dowager

In the complex organization of the Japanese Imperial Court, the title of "empress dowager" does not automatically devolve to the principal consort of an Emperor who has died. The title "Kōtaigō" can only be bestowed or granted by the Emperor who will have acceded to the Chrysanthemum Throne.

The following were among the individuals who were granted this imperial title:

- Empress Dowager Yoshiko (欣子皇太后, Yoshiko kōtaigō; 1779–1846), widow of Emperor Kōkaku
- Empress Dowager Eishō (英照皇太后, Eishō kōtaigō; 1834–1898), widow of Emperor Kōmei
- Empress Dowager Shōken (昭憲皇太后, Shōken kōtaigō; 1849–1914), widow of Emperor Meiji
- Empress Dowager Teimei (貞明皇后, Teimei kōtaigō; 1884–1951), widow of Emperor Taishō
- Empress Dowager Kōjun (香淳皇后, Kōjun kōtaigō; 1903–2000), widow of Emperor Shōwa

==== Korean empress dowager ====
- Empress dowager Myeongheon (1831–1903), wife and widow of Heonjong of Joseon.

=== Europe ===
==== Austria ====
- Caroline Augusta of Bavaria, widow of Emperor Francis I
- Maria Anna of Savoy, widow of Emperor Ferdinand I

==== Holy Roman dowager empresses ====
Adelaide of Italy was Holy Roman Empress by marriage to Emperor Otto the Great and was crowned alongside him in 962. After her husband's death, her son Otto II succeeded as Emperor, and on his death he was succeeded by Adelaide's grandson Otto III. She served as regent until he reached his majority.

Although never referred to as a dowager, Empress Matilda was the Holy Roman Empress from 1114 by her marriage to Emperor Henry V. She continued to be referred to as "Empress" long after the death of her first husband in 1125, and her subsequent remarriage to Geoffrey Plantagenet, Count of Anjou in 1128.

Despite having abandoned the throne of Sicily for her son Frederick II, Empress Constance of Sicily, widow of Henry VI, retained her title as Empress Dowager until her death in 1198.

Eleonora Gonzaga, was Holy Roman Empress by marriage to Emperor Ferdinand III, and after his death was Empress Dowager from 1657–1686.

Other empresses dowagers include:

- Judith of Bavaria, widow of Louis I
- Engelberga, widow of Louis II
- Richilde of Provence, widow of Charles II
- Ageltrude, widow of Guy
- Ota, widow of Arnulf
- Theophanu, widow of Otto II
- Cunigunde of Luxembourg, widow of Henry II
- Gisela of Swabia, widow of Conrad II
- Agnes of Poitou, widow of Henry III
- Eupraxia of Kiev, widow of Henry IV
- Richenza of Northeim, widow of Lothair III
- Maria of Brabant, widow of Otto IV
- Margaret II, Countess of Hainaut, widow of Louis IV
- Elizabeth of Pomerania, widow of Charles IV
- Barbara of Cilli, widow of Sigismund
- Maria of Austria, widow of Maximilian II
- Eleonora Gonzaga, widow of Ferdinand II
- Eleonore Magdalene of Neuburg, widow of Leopold I
- Wilhelmine Amalie of Brunswick-Lüneburg, widow of Joseph I
- Elisabeth Christine of Brunswick-Wolfenbüttel, widow of Charles VI
- Maria Amalia of Austria, widow of Charles VII
- Maria Theresa, widow of Francis I
- Maria Luisa of Spain, widow of Leopold II

==== Russian dowager empresses ====
Dowager empresses of Russia held precedence over the Empress consort. This was occasionally a source of tension. For example, when Paul I was assassinated, Dowager Empress Maria Feodorovna (Sophie Dorothea of Württemberg), for whom this tradition was started, often took the arm of her son Tsar Alexander I at court functions and ceremonies while his wife Empress Elizabeth Alexeievna (Louise of Baden) walked behind, which caused resentment on the part of the young empress. The same thing happened decades later when Emperor Alexander III died, and the Dowager Empress Maria Feodorovna (Dagmar of Denmark) held precedence over Empress Alexandra Fyodorovna (Alix of Hesse), which put an enormous strain on their already tense relationship. The power struggle culminated when the Dowager Empress refused to hand over certain jewels traditionally associated with the Empress Consort.

There have been four dowager empresses in Russia:

- Empress Maria Feodorovna (Sophie Dorothea of Württemberg) (1759–1828) Empress Consort of Paul I of Russia (r. 1796–1801)
- Empress Elizabeth Alexeievna (Louise of Baden) (1779–1826) Empress Consort of Alexander I of Russia (r. 1801–1825)
- Empress Alexandra Feodorovna (Charlotte of Prussia) (1798–1860) Empress Consort of Nicholas I of Russia (r. 1825–1855)
- Empress Maria Feodorovna (Dagmar of Denmark) (1847–1928) Empress Consort of Alexander III of Russia (r. 1881–1894)

Empress Elizabeth Alexeievna was briefly and concurrently, along with her mother in-law Dowager Empress Maria Feodorovna, a Dowager empress. She is therefore often forgotten as a Dowager Empress.

=== South Asia ===
==== Indian empresses dowager ====
Queen-Empress Victoria (1819–1901, r. 1837–1901) was widowed in 1861, before her accession as Empress of India. Her son, her grandson and her great-grandson all died before their wives, and their widows were known as Empresses dowager in this Indian context. Had George VI, the last Emperor of India, died before the independence of India was proclaimed in 1947, his widow would have been known as the dowager empress of India. However, George VI did not die until 1952, some years after India's formal independence and the renunciation of the title Emperor of India by the British monarch (which took place formally in 1948).

- Queen-Empress Alexandra (d. 20 November 1925), widow of King-Emperor Edward VII (r. 1901–1910)
- Queen-Empress Mary (d. 24 March 1953), widow of King-Emperor George V (r. 1910–1936)
- Queen-Empress Elizabeth (d. 30 March 2002), widow of King-Emperor George VI (r. 1936–1947 (Note: Indian Independence Act 1947))

=== Southeast Asia ===
==== Vietnamese empresses dowager ====
Đinh-Early Lê dynasties

- Empress Dowager Dương Vân Nga (952–1000): In 979, her husband Emperor Đinh Bộ Lĩnh died after an assassination, her son Prince Đinh Toàn ascended to the throne, she became empress dowager and handled all political matters. But later she dethroned her son and ceded the throne to Lê Đại Hành and married him. Once again she took the title of empress consort. Because she was an empress twice with two different emperors, she is called "Hoàng hậu hai triều" (Two-dynasty Empress).

Lý dynasty

- Empress Dowager Thượng Dương (?–1073): While she could not give birth to any sons, her husband's concubine Lady Ỷ Lan gave birth to a prince, called Lý Càn Đức. After husband's death, she became empress dowager and declared that she will "buông rèm nhiếp chính" (regent) for the new seven-year-old emperor, but the mother of the new emperor Lady Dowager Ỷ Lan vehemently opposed and forced her to the death. Her tenure of being an empress dowager is one year.
- Empress Dowager Ỷ Lan (c. 1044–1117): After dethroning and killing the empress dowager, she became empress dowager and kept all political powers
- Empress Dowager Chiêu Linh (?–1200): Empress of Emperor Lý Thần Tông. Her son was appointed as crown prince, but later he was dethroned from the seat of crown prince to a normal prince due to an event. Her husband's concubine Lady Đỗ Thụy Châu gave birth to a prince and he was appointed as crown prince later. After her husband's death, the crown prince ascended to the throne, she became empress dowager.
- Empress Dowager Đỗ Thụy Châu: After her son ascended to the throne, she became the co-empress dowager with Empress Dowager Chiêu Linh.
- Empress Dowager An Toàn (?–1226): She was famous for misusing authority during the reign of her son Emperor Lý Huệ Tông. Her daughter-in-law, Empress Trần Thị Dung joined Trần Thủ Độ plotting to overthrow the Lý dynasty and replace by Trần dynasty. Trần Thủ Độ forced her son to abdicate and be a monk at the pagoda, her son did as Trần Thủ Độ told and ceded the throne to her granddaughter Lý Chiêu Hoàng, who is the only empress of Vietnamese history, thus, she became grand empress dowager. But later Trần Thủ Độ forced Lý Chiêu Hoàng to get married with his seven-year-old nephew Trần Cảnh and ceded the throne to Trần Cảnh. At that point, An Toàn was no longer an empress dowager.
- Empress Dowager Trần Thị Dung (?–1259): She became empress dowager after her daughter Lý Chiêu Hoàng ascended to the throne. But later, Lý Chiêu Hoàng ceded the throne to her husband Trần Cảnh. Trần Thị Dung was no longer empress dowager.

Trần dynasty

- Empress Dowager Tuyên Từ (?–1318): A concubine and younger sister-in-law of Emperor Trần Nhân Tông, she is younger sister of the proper Empress Bảo Thánh. In 1293, Emperor Trần Nhân Tông ceded the throne to his son with Empress Bảo Thánh, Trần Anh Tông, some months later her sister Grand Empress Bảo Thánh died, she became the only surviving consort of Grand Emperor Trần Nhân Tông. 1308, Grand Emperor Trần Nhân Tông died, she became empress dowager. 1314, Emperor Trần Anh Tông ceded the throne to his son Trần Minh Tông, she became grand empress dowager.

Nguyễn dynasty

- Empress Dowager Từ Dụ (1810–1902), born Phạm Thị Hằng, was a Vietnamese empress, the wife of Emperor Thiệu Trị (1807–1847, r. 1841–1847) and mother of Emperor Tự Đức.
- Empress Dowager Từ Cung (1890–1980), mother of the last Vietnamese Emperor Bảo Đại.

=== South America ===
==== Brazil ====
- Amélie of Leuchtenberg (1812–1873), second wife and widow of Pedro I of Brazil (r. 1822–1831)

== See also ==
- Consort kin
- Grand empress dowager
- Queen dowager and queen mother
- Valide sultan of the Ottoman Empire
