= Trần Nhân Tông =

Emperor of Đại Việt from 1278 to 1293

Trần Nhân Tông 陳仁宗
- Emperor of Đại Việt
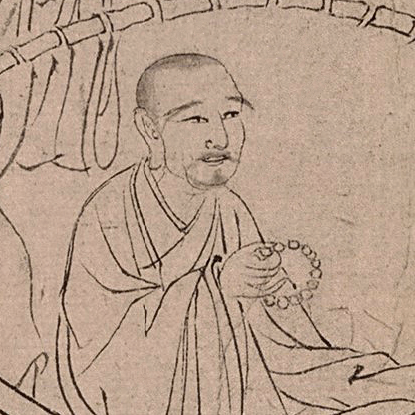

Emperor of Trần dynasty
- Reign: 1278–1293
- Predecessor: Trần Thánh Tông
- Successor: Trần Anh Tông

Emperor Emeritus of Trần dynasty
- Reign: 1294–1308
- Predecessor: Trần Thánh Tông
- Successor: Trần Anh Tông
- Born: 7 December 1258; Thăng Long, Đại Việt
- Died: 16 December 1308 (aged 50); Yên Tử Mountain, Đại Việt
- Burial: Đức Lăng
- Spouse: Empress Bảo Thánh; Empress Tuyên Từ
- Issue: Crown Prince Trần Thuyên; Prince Huệ Vũ Trần Quốc Chẩn; Princess Huyền Trân
Names
- Trần Khâm (陳昑)
Era dates
- Thiệu Bảo (紹寶, 1278–1285); Trùng Hưng (重興, 1285–1293)
Regnal name
- Pháp Thiên Ngự Cực Anh Liệt Vũ Thánh Minh Nhân Hoàng Đế (法天御極英烈武聖明仁皇帝)
Posthumous name
- Pháp-thiên Sùng-đạo Ứng-thế Hoa-dân Long-từ Hiển-huệ Thánh-văn Thần-vũ Nguyên-minh Duệ-hiếu Hoàng Đế 法天崇道應世化民隆慈顯惠聖文神武元明睿孝皇帝
Temple name
- Nhân Tông (仁宗)
- House: Trần
- Father: Trần Thánh Tông
- Mother: Empress Thiên Cảm
- Religion: Buddhism

Trần Nhân Tông (pronounced [ʈʂʌn˨˩ ɲʌn˧ toŋ˧], 7 December 1258–16 December 1308), personal name Trần Khâm (pronounced [ʈʂʌn˨˩ xʌm˧]), temple name Nhân Tông, was the third emperor of the Trần dynasty, reigning over Đại Việt from 1278 to 1293. After ceding the throne to his son Trần Anh Tông, Nhân Tông held the title Emperor Emeritus (Vietnamese: Thái thượng hoàng) from 1294 to his death in 1308. During the second and third Mongol invasions of Đại Việt, the Emperor Nhân Tông and his father the Emperor Emeritus Thánh Tông were credited with the decisive victory against the Yuan dynasty and would thenceforth establish a long period of peace and prosperity over the country.

After retiring from ruling the nation, he practiced Buddhism as a monk and founded the Trúc Lâm school of Vietnamese Buddhism.

== Background ==
Trần Nhân Tông was born on 7 December 1258 as Trần Khâm, the first son of Emperor Trần Thánh Tông, who had ceded the throne by Trần Thái Tông for only eight months, and Empress Thiên Cảm Trần Thị Thiều. It was said that the newborn Trần Khâm was so becoming in appearance that his grandfather Thái Tông and father Thánh Tông named him as Kim Tiên đồng tử (Pupil of the Heavenly Kim Tiên).

Prince Trần Khâm was entitled as Crown Prince of the Trần dynasty in December 1274, he had a younger brother, Prince Tá Thiên (also known as Trần Đức Việp) who was born in 1265 and an elder sister, Princess Thiên Thụy, who would die on the same day as her brother Nhân Tông. Always concerned with the education of his son, in 1274, Thánh Tông appointed the prominent mandarin and general Lê Phụ Trần in the position of the crown prince's professor with two famous scholars Nguyễn Sĩ Cố and Nguyễn Thánh Huấn as assistants. The Emperor himself also composed poems and a literary work named Di hậu lục to educate prince Trần Khâm.

On 8 November 1278, Thánh Tông decided to cede the throne to the Crown Prince Trần Khâm, now Trần Nhân Tông, and held the title Emperor Emeritus. After the coronation, Nhân Tông changed the era name to Thiệu Bảo (紹 寶, 1278–1285), during his reign, the emperor had one more era name which was Trùng Hưng (重 興, 1285–1293). Although passing the throne to his son, Thánh Tông continued to co-rule the country with Nhân Tông from 1279 to his death in 1290.

== Reign ==
=== Mongol invasions ===
- Trần Nhân Tông
- Vietnamese alphabet: Trần Nhân Tông
- Chữ Hán: 陳仁宗

- Trần Nhân Tông
- Vietnamese alphabet: Trần Khâm
- Chữ Hán: 陳昑

In 1279, the Yuan dynasty won a decisive victory over the Song dynasty in Battle of Yamen which marked the end of the Song dynasty and the total control of Kublai Khan over China. As a result, Kublai Khan began his conquest over the southern regions such as Đại Việt and Champa. Being aware of the situation, Thánh Tông and Nhân Tông began to prepare the country for the war while trying to keep a flexible policy with the Yuan dynasty. Prince Chiêu Văn (also known as Trần Nhật Duật) was appointed to pacify the revolt led by Trịnh Giác Mật in Đà Giang. He tried by diplomacy to keep the country stable before the war. With his knowledge of a minority people's language and culture, he successfully accomplished his task in 1278, so now the country was free to deal with the threat from the North.

In October 1282, the Retired Emperor Thánh Tông and the Emperor Nhân Tông gathered all members of the royal family, and officials in the royal court in Bình Than to discuss the unavoidable war. Two prominent generals of Đại Việt's army were called Trần Khánh Dư, former commander of the army but was deprived of all titles and Trần Quốc Tuấn, who would later be called Prince Hưng Đạo. In 1283 Quốc Tuấn was appointed as commander-in-chief (Quốc công tiết chế) of the army while the Retired Emperor and the Emperor began to hold military exercises with their generals and troops.

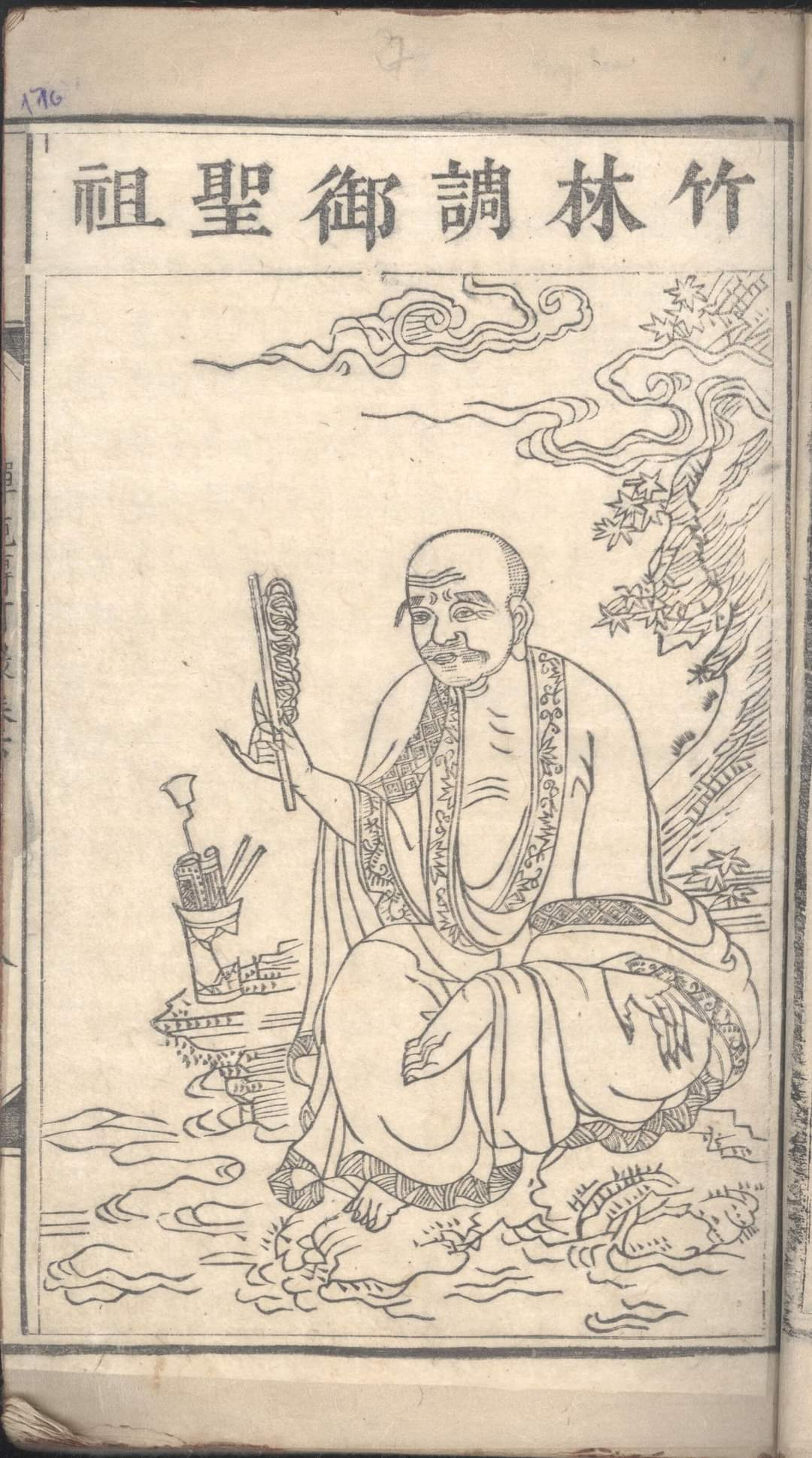
Trần Nhân Tông became a Buddhist monk after abdication, depicted in the Thiền uyển tập anh

In December 1284, the second Yuan's invasion of Đại Việt commenced under the command of Kublai Khan's prince Toghan. Đại Việt was attacked in two directions, Toghan himself conducted the infantry and invaded from the north while the Yuan navy (under general Sogetu) advanced from the southern border through Champa's territory. In the beginning of the war, Thánh Tông and Nhân Tông had to call for retreat when Prince Chiêu Minh (also known as Trần Quang Khải) who commanded troops, were trying to stop Sogetu's fleet in Nghệ An Province.

During this time, several high-ranking officials and members of the Trần dynasty defected to the Yuan, this included Thánh Tông's own brother, Prince Chiêu Quốc (also known as Trần Ích Tắc) and Trần Kiện who was son of Prince Tĩnh Quốc (also known as Trần Quốc Khang).

For the safety of Thánh Tông and Nhân Tông's retreat, Princess An Tư was offered as a gift and diversion for prince Toghan while Marquis Bảo Nghĩa (also known as Trần Bình Trọng) was captured and later killed in the Battle of Đà Mạc while defending the two emperors. In the southern border, Quang Khải had to retreat under pressure from Sogetu's navy and the defection of the governor of Nghệ An.

The critical situation began to change with the dynasty's victory in the Battle of Hàm Tử in April 1285 where troops commanded by Trần Nhật Duật, Prince Chiêu Thành, Quốc Toản and Nguyễn Khoái were finally able to defeat Sogetu's fleet. On 10 May 1285, Quang Khải fought in the decisive Battle of Chương Dương where Sogetu's navy was almost destroyed and the war turned in the favour of the Trần dynasty. Ten days after Sogetu was killed, Nhân Tông and Thánh Tông returned to the capital Thăng Long on 6 June 1285.

In March 1287, the Yuan dynasty launched their third invasion of Đại Việt. Unlike the second attack, this time Quốc Tuấn affirmed with the Emperor that Đại Việt's army could easily break the Yuan's military campaign. This invasion ended after only one year due to a disastrous defeat of the Yuan navy in the Battle of Bạch Đằng on 8 March 1288. Besides Quốc Tuấn, other notable generals of the Trần dynasty during this time were Prince Nhân Huệ (also known as Trần Khánh Dư) who destroyed the logistics convoy of the Yuan navy in the Battle of Vân Đồn. Another was general Phạm Ngũ Lão who took charge of ambushing prince Toghan's retreating troops.

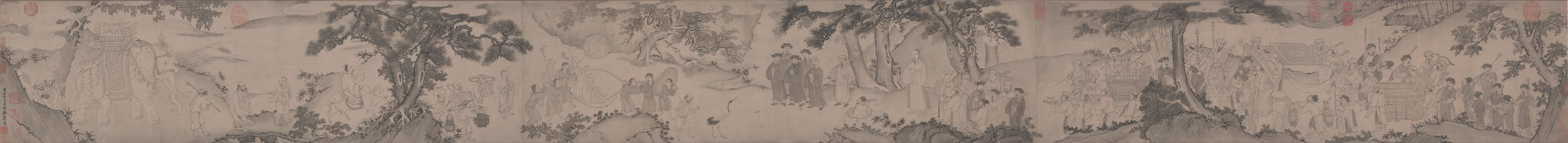
Scroll from the Trần dynasty showing the scene in which the retired emperor Trần Nhân Tông returns to Thăng Long from his hermitage.

=== After the war ===
In rewarding generals and mandarins after the victory, Thánh Tông and Nhân Tông cautioned them of the northern border. As to the defectors during the war, the Emperor issued an order in which the family name of every defected member of the Trần clan was changed to Mai, for example Trần Kiện was renamed as Mai Kiện. The only defected prince of the Trần clan, Trần Ích Tắc, was exempted from this order but he was called in historical accounts of the Trần dynasty by the name "Ả Trần" ("the woman named Trần") meaning that Trần Ích Tắc would be known as a "coward as a woman".

The Retired Emperor Thánh Tông died on 25 May 1290 at the age of 50. As the sole ruler of Đại Việt, Nhân Tông ordered to relax the taxing policy, relieving the poor and postponing the military campaign against Ai Lao so that the country could recover after two fierce wars, several famines and natural disasters.

On 3 February 1292, Nhân Tông entitled his first son Trần Thuyên as Crown Prince of the Trần dynasty and passed the throne to him on 3 March 1293.

Nhân Tông would then spend more time in seeking spiritual awakening. In 1295, he was ordained as Buddhist monk. In 1299, he came to the mountain of Yên Tử in modern-day Quảng Ninh, where he vowed to follow the ten ascetic practices as a Buddha's student. He also established a monastery, teaching about Buddhist principles and receiving a substantial amount of disciples. He was thought to have founded Trúc Lâm, the only indigenous Thiền Buddhist sect in Vietnam. In addition, he travelled across the nation to teach Thiền practices to monks and encourage his subjects to follow the Ten Good Acts theory (Daśakuśalakarmāṇi).

In 1301, he visited Champa, and lived for nine months at Jaya Sinhavarman III's court.

In 1306, he gave his daughter, Princess Huyen Tran, in marriage to the Champa king Jaya Simhavarman III, in return for two Cham provinces.

== Family ==
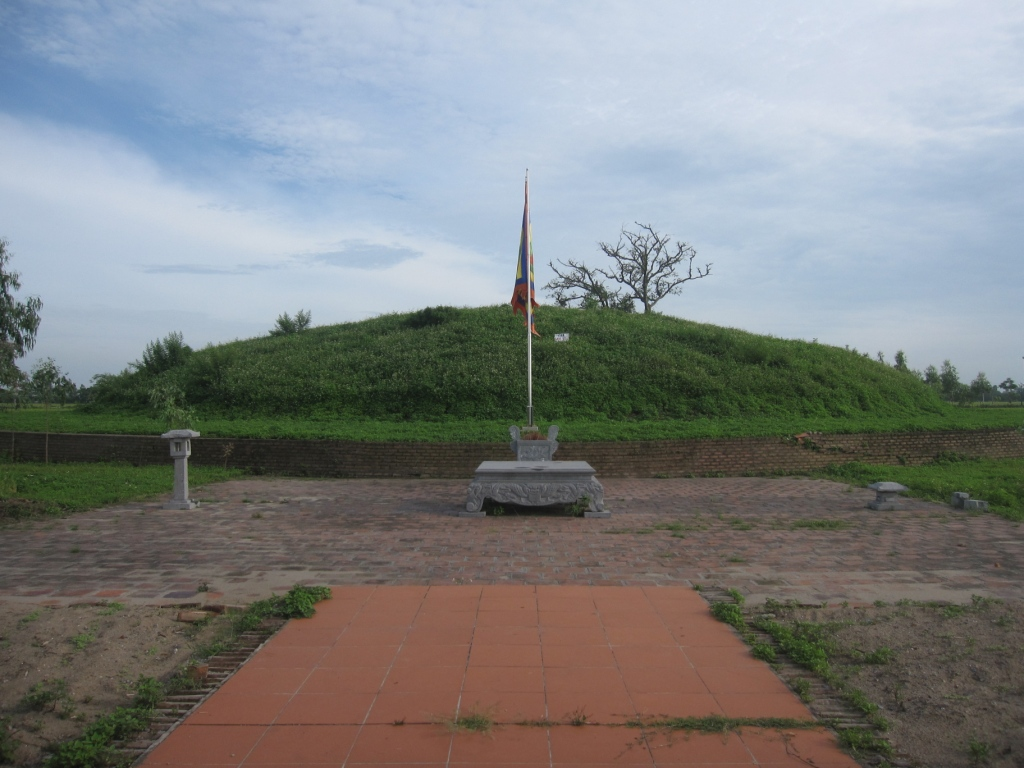
Đức Lăng, the tomb of Trần Nhân Tông in Thái Bình Province, Vietnam

Trần Nhân Tông married Princess Khâm Từ, later Empress Consort Khâm Từ Bảo Thánh, the eldest daughter of Grand Prince Hưng Đạo Trần Quốc Tuấn, in December 1274 when he was entitled as crown prince. Trần Nhân Tông had his first son, Trần Thuyên, on 17 September 1276, Trần Thuyên eventually became Nhân Tông's successor as Trần Anh Tông.

- Father: Trần Thánh Tông
- Mother: Empress Nguyên Thánh Thiên Cảm Trần Thị Thiều of Trần Liễu clan
- Consort(s) and their respectively issues:
1. Princess Trần Thị Trinh of Trần Liễu clan, daughter of Grand Prince Hưng Đạo. Later Empress Consort Khâm Từ Bảo Thánh
  1. Crown Prince Trần Thuyên, later Emperor Trần Anh Tông
1. Empress Tuyên Từ of Trần Liễu clan, younger sister of Empress Consort Khâm Từ Bảo Thánh
  1. Prince Tran Quoc Chan
2. Royal Consort Dang Thi Loan
- Other Issues:
1. Princess Thượng Trân
2. Princess Thiên Trân
3. Princess Huyền Trân

== Legacy ==
Most cities in Vietnam have named major streets after him.

Trần Nhân Tông House of Trần Born: 1258 Died: 1308
Regnal titles
Preceded by Trần Thánh Tông	Emperor of Trần dynasty 1278–1293	Succeeded by Trần Anh Tông
Preceded by Trần Thánh Tông	Retired Emperor of Trần dynasty 1294–1308	Succeeded by Trần Anh Tông
