= Thánh Tông =

- Vietnamese alphabet: Thánh Tông
- Chữ Hán: 聖宗
- Literal meaning: Holy Ancestor

Thánh Tông is the temple name used for several emperors of Vietnam. It may refer to:

- Lý Thánh Tông (1023–1072, reigned 1054–1072), emperor of the Lý dynasty
- Trần Thánh Tông (1240–1290, reigned 1258–1278), emperor of the Trần dynasty
- Lê Thánh Tông (1442–1497, reigned 1460–1497), emperor of the Lê dynasty
