= Trần Quang Khải =

13th-century Vietnamese prince

Trần Quang Khải 陳光啓
- Prince Chiêu Minh
- Born: 1241; Thăng Long, Đại Việt
- Died: 1294 (aged 52–53); Thăng Long, Đại Việt
- House: Trần dynasty
- Father: Trần Thái Tông
- Mother: Queen Thuận Thiên

Prince Chiêu Minh Trần Quang Khải (1241–1294) was the third son of Trần Thái Tông, first emperor of the Trần dynasty of Vietnam. Being the younger brother of the Emperor Trần Thánh Tông and holding the position of grand chancellor of the Trần dynasty for many years, Trần Quang Khải was one of the most important figures of the Trần family and the royal court during the reigns of emperors Thánh Tông and Nhân Tông. In the second war of resistance against the Mongol invasion, Trần Quang Khải and Trần Hưng Đạo were two key commanders of the Đại Việt army who helped the Emperor defeat the troops of Kublai Khan's son prince Toghan. Besides his military and administrative activities, Prince Chiêu Minh was also a famous poet and was credited as the creator of the dance of flowers. Today, Trần Quang Khải is still considered one of the most famous historical figures of the Trần dynasty and is worshiped in several temples in Vietnam.

== Background ==
Trần Quang Khải

Vietnamese name
- Vietnamese: Trần Quang Khải
- Hán-Nôm: 陳光啓

Prince Chiêu Minh (Vietnamese: Chiêu Minh vương) Trần Quang Khải was born in 1241 as the third son of the Emperor Trần Thái Tông and the Queen Thuận Thiên. Besides his elder brother the Emperor Trần Thánh Tông, Trần Quang Khải had two other famous younger brothers, Prince Chiêu Quốc (Chiêu Quốc vương) Trần Ích Tắc who was broadly known not only for his intelligence but also for his notorious defection to the Yuan dynasty side during the second Mongol invasion of Đại Việt and Prince Chiêu Văn (Chiêu Văn vương) Trần Nhật Duật who fought side by side with him in the war against the Yuan dynasty.

== History ==
=== In royal court and military activities ===
In 1261, at the age of only 20, Trần Quang Khải was appointed by Thánh Tông as minister instead of his elder brother Prince Tĩnh Quốc (Tĩnh Quốc Đại vương) Trần Quốc Khang because the Emperor considered Quốc Khang not capable for an important position in royal court. After the death of two grand chancellors: Trần Thủ Độ in 1264 and Trần Nhật Hiệu in 1269, Prince Chiêu Minh was promoted to this position in 1271 and thus became the most important official in the royal court. When Trần Nhân Tông succeeded Thánh Tông in 1278, Trần Quang Khải continued to take charge of administrative activities as grand chancellor while Trần Hưng Đạo was chosen as the grand commander of the Đại Việt army in 1283 to prepare for the threat from the Yuan dynasty.

In 1279, the Yuan dynasty had the decisive victory over the Song dynasty in Battle of Yamen which marked the end of the Song dynasty and the total control of Kublai Khan over China. As a result, Kublai Khan began to pursue his attempt to take over the southern countries like Đại Việt or Champa. In December 1284, the second Yuan invasion of Đại Việt began under the command of Kublai Khan's prince Toghan. Đại Việt was attacked from two directions, Toghan himself conducted the infantry invasion from the northern border while Yuan's navy under general Sogetu advanced from the southern border through Champa's territory. It was Trần Quang Khải who conducted the Đại Việt army carrying the mission of stopping Toa Đô's troops before he could meet Toghan's troops as Yuan's plan. In the beginning, Trần Quang Khải had to retreat under pressure from Sogetu's navy and the defection of the governor of Nghe An, the southern border province. However, the Trần dynasty began to change the situation after the victory of the Đại Việt army commanded by Trần Nhật Duật, Prince Chiêu Thành, Trần Quốc Toản and Nguyễn Khoái over Sogetu's troops in Battle of Hàm Tử. On the tenth day of the fifth lunar month (June 14) 1285, Trần Quang Khải fought the decisive battle in Chương Dương where Yuan's navy was almost destroyed and therefore the balance in battlefield shifted definitively in favor of the Trần dynasty. Ten days after Sogetu was killed and Trần's Emperor Nhân Tông and Retired Emperor Thánh Tông returned to capital Thăng Long on the sixth day of the sixth lunar month (July 19), 1285.

After the Mongol invasions, Trần Quang Khải kept the position of grand chancellor until his death on July 3 of Lunar calendar, 1294. Despite the inherited hatred from their fathers Trần Cảnh and Trần Liễu, Trần Quang Khải and Trần Hưng Đạo were famous for their close relation which kept the royal court and Trần family united during not only the war but also the peaceful period afterwards.

=== As scholar ===
Like his brothers Trần Nhật Duật and Trần Ích Tắc, Trần Quang Khải was not only a capable official but also a well-known scholar. Prince Chiêu Minh had a collection of poems named Lạc đạo tập, his most famous poem might be Tụng giá hoàn kinh (chữ Hán: 從 駕 還 京) which was composed on the occasion of Đại Việt's victory over the Mongol army:

chữ Hán: 從 駕 還 京 奪 槊 章 陽 渡 擒 胡 鹹 子 關 太 平 宜 努 力 萬 古 此 江 山	Vietnamese version: Tụng giá hoàn kinh Đoạt sáo Chương Dương độ Cầm Hồ Hàm Tử quan Thái bình tu trí lực Vạn cổ thử giang san.	English version: Return to the capital At Chuong Duong Port, we seized the enemy's spears, At Ham Tu Pass, we held the barbars back. Peace is here: let's strive further To keep the Fatherland for ever.

As Nam quốc sơn hà by Lý Thường Kiệt, Tụng giá hoàn kinh was considered one of the finest example for Vietnamese patriotic literature during feudal era. Besides his poems, Trần Quang Khải and his brother Trần Nhật Duật were credited as creators of dance of flowers (múa bài bông), a traditional dance which is still preserved in Nam Định. Prince Chiêu Minh could also speak languages of minority people in Đại Việt.

== Family ==
Trần Quang Khải had a son named Prince Văn Túc (Văn Túc vương) Trần Đạo Tái who was also famous for his literature and since most favoured by the Emperor Trần Nhân Tông amongst other cousins. Trần Quang Khải also had a famous great grandson, Marquis Chương Túc (Chương Túc hầu) Trần Nguyên Đán, who was minister during the reign of the Emperor Trần Nghệ Tông and maternal grandfather of Nguyễn Trãi, a famous scholar and official who served the Lê dynasty.

== Legacy ==
Most cities in Vietnam have named major streets after him.
