= Trần Thánh Tông =

Emperor of Đại Việt from 1258 to 1278

Trần Thánh Tông; 陳聖宗
- Emperor of Đại Việt

Emperor of the Trần dynasty
- Reign: March 30, 1258 – November 8, 1278
- Predecessor: Trần Thái Tông
- Successor: Trần Nhân Tông

Retired Emperor of the Trần dynasty
- Reign: November 8, 1279 – October 12, 1290
- Predecessor: Trần Thái Tông
- Successor: Trần Nhân Tông
- Born: October 12, 1240; Thăng Long, Đại Việt
- Died: July 3, 1290 (aged 49); Thăng Long, Đại Việt
- Burial: Dụ Lăng
- Spouse: Empress Thiên Cảm Trần Thị Thiều
- Issue: Crown Prince Trần Khâm; Prince Tá Thiên Trần Đức Việp; Princess Thiên Thụy
Names
- Trần Hoảng (陳晃)
Era dates
- Thiệu Long (紹隆, 1258–1272); Bảo Phù (寶符, 1273–1278)
Regnal name
- Hiến Thiên Thể Đạo Đại Minh Quang Hiếu hoàng đế (憲天體道大明光孝皇帝)
Posthumous name
- Huyền công thịnh đức nhân minh văn vũ tuyên hiếu hoàng đế (玄功盛德仁明文武宣孝皇帝)
Temple name
- Thánh Tông (聖宗)
- House: Trần dynasty
- Father: Trần Thái Tông
- Mother: Empress Thuận Thiên
- Religion: Buddhism

Trần Thánh Tông (October 12, 1240 – July 3, 1290), personal name Trần Hoảng (陳晃), was the second emperor of the Trần dynasty, reigning over Đại Việt from 1258 to 1278. After ceding the throne to his son Trần Nhân Tông, Thánh Tông held the title of retired emperor (Thái thượng hoàng) from 1279 until his death in 1290. During the second and the third Mongol invasions of Đại Việt, Retired Emperor Thánh Tông and Emperor Nhân Tông were credited as the supreme commanders who led the nation to the final victories and, as a result, established a long period of peace and prosperity over the country. With his successful rulings in both military and civil matters, Trần Thánh Tông was considered one of the greatest emperors of not only the Trần dynasty but also the whole dynastic era in the history of Vietnam.

== Background and during Thái Tông's reign ==
Trần Hoảng was born on the 25th day of the ninth lunar month in 1240, as the second prince but the first natural son of emperor Trần Thái Tông and Empress Consort Thuận Thiên. He had a half-brother on the mother's side, Prince Tĩnh Quốc (Tĩnh Quốc đại vương) Trần Quốc Khang, who was born after the forced marriage by Trần Thủ Độ between Emperor Thái Tông and Princess Thuận Thiên. In fact, although being Thái Tông's first prince, Trần Quốc Khang was the son of his elder brother Prince Hoài Trần Liễu, therefore officially he was not chosen by Thái Tông as the heir, a position which ultimately belonged to Prince Trần Hoảng. Besides Prince Tĩnh Quốc, Trần Hoảng had other younger brothers, including Prince Chiêu Minh Trần Quang Khải (who was also born to Empress Thuận Thiên), Prince Chiêu Quốc Trần Ích Tắc, and Prince Chiêu Văn Trần Nhật Duật.

In 1257, Crown Prince Trần Hoảng witnessed the first Mongol invasion in Vietnam. In the beginning, Đại Việt's army suffered several defeats by the Mongols, who had already conquered a vast area in Asia. Several high-ranking officials of the Trần dynasty were so frightened that Prince Khâm Thiên Trần Nhật Hiệu, younger brother of Thái Tông, even suggested to the Emperor that they might escape from Đại Việt to Song China. But because of the firm faith of Emperor Thái Tông, Grand Chancellor Trần Thủ Độ, and the talents of generals such as Prince Hưng Đạo Trần Quốc Tuấn and Lê Phụ Trần, the Trần dynasty was able to repulse the invasion and ultimately re-establish peace in Đại Việt in December 1257.

Returning to the capital Thăng Long, Trần Thái Tông decided to cede the throne to Crown Prince Trần Hoảng, now Trần Thánh Tông, on the 24th day of the second lunar month (March 30), 1258. After the coronation, Thánh Tông changed the era name to Thiệu Long (紹隆; 1258–1272). During his reign, the Emperor had one more era name, Bảo Phù (寶符; 1273–1278). Although passing the throne to his son, Thái Tông continued to rule the country with Thánh Tông in the position of retired emperor from 1259 to his death in 1277.

== As emperor ==
After his enthronement, Thánh Tông and his father began to rehabilitate both the country's economy and administrative system, which had been heavily damaged by the Mongol invasion and the troubled time at the end of the Lý dynasty. In June 1261, the king opened an examination for scholars who wanted to be appointed as mandarins of the administrative system. The examination comprised two abilities of writing and calculating. In the royal court, Thánh Tông proved to be a skilled ruler with his often right appointment of officials, such as his brother Prince Chiêu Minh Trần Quang Khải for the position of grand chancellor, or Lê Phụ Trần and Prince Hưng Đạo Trần Quốc Tuấn for the position of military commander. For members of the royal family, Thánh Tông had them hire the poor to cultivate their land, thus creating social reform.

In March 1266, Trần Thánh Tông ordered his first imperial examination to be carried out, in which more than 50 scholars were chosen for high-ranking positions in the royal court and administrative system of Đại Việt. For the purpose of educating more scholars for the royal court, Thánh Tông permitted his brother Trần Ích Tắc to open a private school at the latter's palace due to his intellectual ability. Several prominent future mandarins of the royal court, including Mạc Đĩnh Chi or Bùi Phóng, were trained in this school. At the same time, the Emperor also reinforced Đại Việt's army by several recruitments, and by reorganizing the military to improve its efficiency. In addition, Trần Thánh Tông always kept a vigilant eye on the northern border by sending several scout units to learn about military actions of the Yuan dynasty, the potential threat against Đại Việt.

After the death of Retired Emperor Trần Thái Tông on April 1, 1277 (in the lunar calendar), Trần Thánh Tông officially began his reign as the sole ruler of Đại Việt, but he decided to pass the throne to Crown Prince Trần Khâm, now Trần Nhân Tông, only one year later. He took up the post of retired emperor on the 22nd day of the tenth lunar month (November 8), 1278.

=== Negotiations with Kublai ===
In 1268, the Yuan court sent Hulonghaiya to the Vietnamese capital to replace Nanladin as overseer of Annam with his assistant Zhang Tingzhen. The next year Zhang replaced Hulonghaiya as overseer while holding the prestigious title of Grant Master for the Court Precedence. Arriving in the Vietnamese capital Thăng Long, Zhang delivered Kublai Khan's edict, but king Thánh Tông stood (rather than kowtowed) to receive it. Zhang accused the king of maintaining connections with the Song dynasty in Southern China, and threatened him with Yuan military forces – a million Yuan troops who were besieging Xiangyang "could reach Đại Việt" in less than two months. According to Chinese sources, this scared the Vietnamese king and made him kowtow to the edict. The king nonetheless had more complaints which can be seen in his dialogue with Zhang. After few sentences, Trần Thánh Tông felt increasingly angry. Hence he ordered guards to draw their swords and surround Zhang to threaten him. Seeing this, Zhang untied his bow and sword and lay them down on the floor in middle of the hall, saying: "See what you can do to me!". The Vietnamese king and his guards were impressed with Zhang's courage.

In 1269, Trần Thánh Tông memorialized the Yuan court that the two Muslim merchants had died, so he would send two large elephants demanded by Huilonghaiya in the proper tribute year. In the next year, the Secretariat of the Yuan sent to the Vietnamese king a message, quoting the words from the Spring and Autumn Annals to chastise him for not "having kowtowed to the imperial edict; for having treated the emissary of the Son of Heaven (Kublai) improperly; for having presented bad-tasting medicine; and for having dishonest in the matter of the Muslim merchants." Trần Thánh Tông refused these accusations in his letter written in Classical Chinese to Kublai next year (1271). In the next two years, Kublai sent new overseers to Đại Việt, demanded for searching the lost copper columns of Ma Yuan which erected after the Trung sisters' rebellion was suppressed in 43 AD, and once again wanted Trần Thánh Tông to be presented in Dadu in person. He refused.

== As retired emperor ==
=== Second Mongol invasion ===
In 1279, the Yuan dynasty decisively defeated the Song dynasty in the Battle of Yamen, which marked the end of the Song dynasty and began the total control of Kublai Khan over China. As a result, Kublai Khan began to expose his attempt to take over the southern countries like Đại Việt or Champa. Aware of the situation, Thánh Tông and Nhân Tông began to prepare the military for the obvious and inevitable war while trying to maintain a flexible policy towards the Yuan dynasty. Prince Chiêu Văn Trần Nhật Duật was appointed with the task of pacifying the revolt led by Trịnh Giác Mật in Đà Giang by diplomatic means to keep the country stable before the war. With his knowledge of the minority people's language and culture, Trần Nhật Duật successfully accomplished his task in 1278; the Trần dynasty was hence free to deal with the threat from the north. In October 1282, Retired Emperor Trần Thánh Tông and Emperor Trần Nhân Tông gathered all members of the royal family, the Trần clan, and officials at the royal court in Bình Than to discuss the unavoidable war. Two prominent generals of the Đại Việt army who were noticed on this occasion were Trần Khánh Dư, the former commander of the army but who was deprived of all titles after his guilt, and Trần Quốc Toản, a marquis who was only sixteen years old. In 1283, Prince Hưng Đạo Trần Quốc Tuấn was appointed the commander-in-chief (Quốc công tiết chế) of the Đại Việt army, and the Retired Emperor and the Emperor began to hold military exercises with their generals and troops.

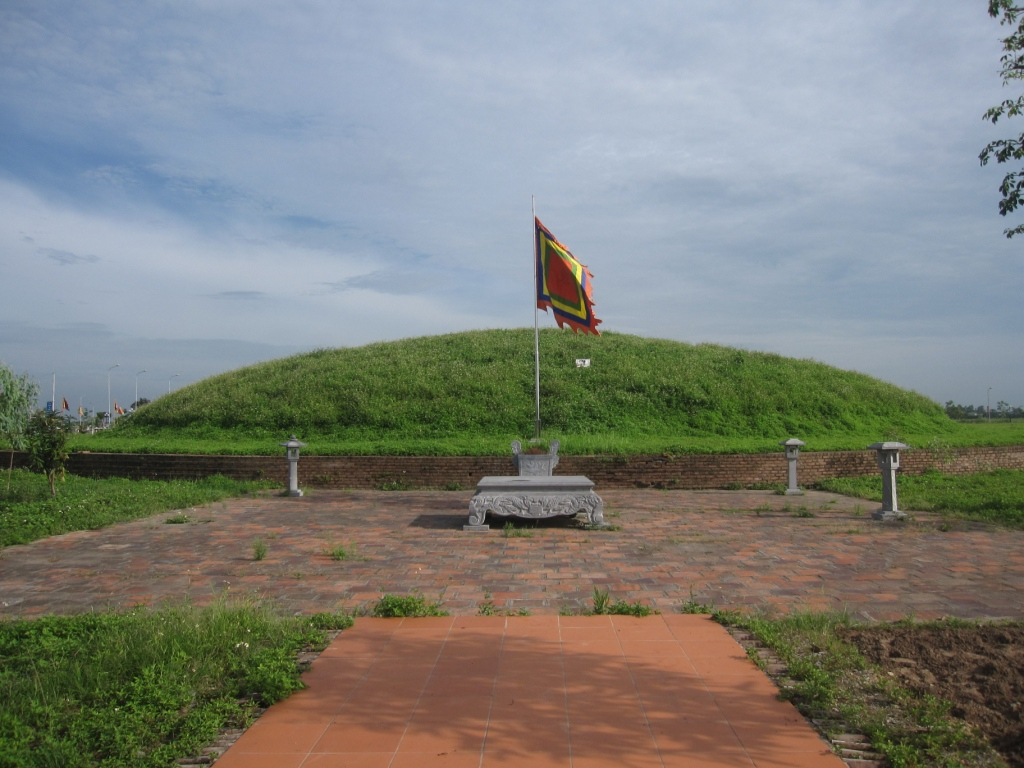
Mausoleum of Trần Thánh Tông

In December 1284, the second Yuan invasion of Đại Việt began under the command of Kublai Khan's son Toghan. Đại Việt was attacked from two directions, with Toghan himself commanding the infantry's invasion from the northern border while the Yuan navy under General Sogetu advanced from the southern border through Champan territory. At the beginning of the war, Thánh Tông and Nhân Tông ordered the army to retreat to avoid pressure from the Yuan force when Prince Chiêu Minh Trần Quang Khải commanded troops try to stop Sogetu's fleet in the Nghệ An Province. During this time, several high-ranking officials and members of the Trần royal family defected to Yuan forces, including Thánh Tông's own brother Prince Chiêu Quốc Trần Ích Tắc, and Trần Kiện, who was the son of Prince Tĩnh Quốc Trần Quốc Khang. For the safety of Thánh Tông and Nhân Tông's retreat, Princess An Tư was offered as a gift and a diversion for Toghan, while Marquis Bảo Nghĩa Trần Bình Trọng was captured and later killed in the Battle of Đà Mạc while defending the two emperors. At the southern border, Trần Quang Khải was also forced to retreat under the pressure of Sogetu's navy and the defection of the governor of Nghe An. Despite the repeated problems, the royal family and royal court of the Trần dynasty maintained their harmony and determination owing to favourable decisions and actions from Thánh Tông, Nhân Tông, Trần Quốc Tuấn and Trần Quang Khải.

The critical situation of the Trần dynasty began to change after their victory at the Battle of Hàm Tử in April 1285, where troops commanded by Trần Nhật Duật, Prince Chiêu Thành, Trần Quốc Toản, and Nguyễn Khoái were finally able to defeat Sogetu's fleet. On May 10, 1285 (in the lunar calendar), Trần Quang Khải fought a decisive battle at Chương Dương where Yuan's navy was almost destroyed; the balance on the battlefield tilted definitively in favour of the Trần dynasty. Ten days after Sogetu was killed, Emperor Nhân Tông and Retired Emperor Thánh Tông returned to the capital, Thăng Long, on June 6, 1285 (in the lunar calendar).

=== Third Mongol invasion ===
In March 1287, the Yuan dynasty launched their third invasion of Đại Việt. Unlike in the second attack, Prince Hưng Đạo Trần Quốc Tuấn, the commander-in-chief, affirmed that Đại Việt's army could easily break the Yuan military campaign. Indeed, this invasion ended one year later with a disastrous defeat of the Yuan navy at the Battle of Bạch Đằng on March 8, 1288 (in the lunar calendar). Besides Trần Quốc Tuấn, other notable generals of the Trần dynasty during this time included Prince Nhân Huệ Trần Khánh Dư, who destroyed the Yuan navy's logistics convoy at the Battle of Vân Đồn, and General Phạm Ngũ Lão, who was responsible for ambushing Toghan's retreating troops.

In rewarding generals and mandarins Trần dynasty after the victory, Thánh Tông and Nhân Tông also reminded them to be cautious of the northern border. The Emperor also issued an order in which the family name of every defector from the Trần clan was changed to Mai – Trần Kiện, for instance, was renamed Mai Kiện. As the only prince from the Trần clan who defected, Trần Ích Tắc was exempt from this requirement, but was referred to in historical accounts of the Trần dynasty by the name "Ả Trần" ('the woman named Trần'), implying that Trần Ích Tắc was as cowardly as a woman.

Retired Emperor Trần Thánh Tông died on May 25, 1290 (in the lunar calendar), at the age of 50. He was buried in Dụ Lăng with the posthumous name Huyền công thịnh đức nhân minh văn vũ tuyên hiếu hoàng đế (玄功盛德仁明文武宣孝皇帝).

== Family ==
Trần Thánh Tông had one consort, Empress Thiên Cảm Trần Thiều, the fifth daughter of his uncle Trần Liễu. Thánh Tông's first son, Trần Khâm, was born on November 11, 1258 (in the lunar calendar), only eight months after the Emperor's enthronement; he was entitled as Crown Prince in December 1274. His second son, Prince Tá Thiên Trần Đức Việp, was born in 1265. Trần Thánh Tông's only daughter was Princess Thiên Thụy, who married to Prince Hưng Vũ Trần Quốc Nghiễn, son of Trần Quốc Tuấn. She had an adulterous affair with General Trần Khánh Dư, which almost led to the latter's death by order of the Emperor. Princess Thiên Thụy and her younger brother Trần Nhân Tông died on the same day, November 3, 1308 (in the lunar calendar).

== Legacy ==
The Lê dynasty historian Ngô Sĩ Liên praised Trần Thánh Tông as one of the finest monarchs of the Trần dynasty, as not only a righteous ruler, but also a dutiful son, kind-hearted brother and father with sense of responsibility who was credited for the stability of both the royal family and the whole country. Thánh Tông's successful reign was the foundation for the subsequent long period of prosperity and peace in Đại Việt. Moreover, like his brother Trần Quang Khải, Trần Ích Tắc and Trần Nhật Duật, Trần Thánh Tông was a renowned scholar. Thánh Tông taught his princes with his own poems, and he also had a literary work named Di hậu lục. As a Confucian historian, Ngô Sĩ Liên did, however, sometimes criticize the Emperor for his devotion for Buddhism, which was seen as not being suitable for a person in a high position like him.

Trần Thánh Tông House of Trần Born: 1240 Died: 1290
Regnal titles
Preceded by Trần Thái Tông	Emperor of Trần dynasty 1258–1278	Succeeded by Trần Nhân Tông
Preceded by Trần Thái Tông	Retired Emperor of Trần dynasty 1279–1290	Succeeded by Trần Nhân Tông
