= Trần Liễu =

Trần Liễu 陳柳
- Prince Yên Sinh

Prince Phụng Càn
- Reign: under Lý Huệ Tông

King Hiển
- Reign: 1234–1236

Prince Hoài
- Reign: 1236–1237

Prince Yên Sinh
- Reign: 1237–1251
- Born: 1211; Thang Long, Đại Việt
- Died: 1251 (aged 39–40); Yên Sinh, Đại Việt
- Spouse: Thuận Thiên; Lady Thiện Đạo
- Issue: Trần Tung; Prince Vũ Thành Trần Doãn; Prince Hưng Đạo Trần Quốc Tuấn; Empress Trần Thị Thiều
- House: Trần dynasty
- Father: Trần Thừa

Prince Yên Sinh Trần Liễu (1211–1251) was the elder brother of the Trần Thái Tông, the first emperor of the Trần dynasty. Initially, Trần Liễu was honoured by his younger brother with the title King Hiển (Vietnamese: Hiển Hoàng) but he was downgraded to Prince Yên Sinh after the short-lived revolt in fury of losing his pregnant wife, Princess Thuận Thiên, to the Emperor under the pressure of Imperial Regent Trần Thủ Độ. Besides this event, Trần Liễu was well known in the history of Vietnam for being the father of Trần Hưng Đạo, commander-in-chief of the Đại Việt army during the second and third war of resistance against the Mongol invasion.

== Background ==
Trần Liễu was born in 1211 as the first son of Trần Thừa and grandson of Trần Lý, the head of the Trần clan in Lưu Gia village. During the troubled time under the reign of Lý Cao Tông, the Crown Prince Lý Sảm sought refuge in Trần Lý's family and decided to marry his beautiful daughter Trần Thị Dung, younger sister of Trần Thừa, in 1209. Afterward, it was the Trần clan who helped Lý Cao Tông and Lý Sảm restore the throne in Thăng Long, therefore the Emperor appointed several members of the Trần clan for high positions in the royal court such as Tô Trung Từ who was uncle of Trần Thị Dung, or Trần Tự Khánh who was Trần Thừa's younger brother. In 1211 the Crown Prince Lý Sảm was enthroned as Lý Huệ Tông after the death of Lý Cao Tông, by then the Trần clan's position began to rise in royal court. During this time, Trần Liễu was entitled by Lý emperor as Prince Phụng Càn (Phụng Càn vương) and married to Princess Thuận Thiên who was elder sister of Empress Regnant Lý Chiêu Hoàng.

In October 1224, Lý Huệ Tông decided to cede the throne to his second daughter, the Princess Chiêu Thánh, now the Empress Regnant Lý Chiêu Hoàng. Chiêu Hoàng was only six at that time so every important decision in the royal court was made by the Trần clan. Profiting from this circumstance, Trần Thủ Độ arranged a marriage between Chiêu Hoàng and Trần Cảnh, the eight-year-old son of Trần Thừa and the younger brother of Trần Liễu. With Trần Cảnh being the Empress Regnant's husband, Trần Thủ Độ was finally able to overthrow the Lý dynasty by making Lý Chiêu Hoàng pass the throne to Trần Cảnh, now Trần Thái Tông, in 1225.

== History ==
In August 1228 Trần Thái Tông appointed Trần Liễu for the position of prime minister (Thái úy) of the royal court. He was promoted to Regent of the Emperor in 1234 and was honoured by the Emperor with the title King Hiển (Hiển Hoàng) which was criticized by the historian Ngô Sĩ Liên as an over-merit and origin of Trần Liễu's revolt afterwards. However, in 1236 Trần Liễu committed a serious guilt in royal palace when he violated a former concubine of the Lý dynasty, therefore he was downgraded to Prince Hoài (Hoài vương).

According to Đại Việt sử kí toàn thư, Thái Tông and his wife the Empress Chiêu Thánh did not have their first son for a while, this situation in the royal family made grand chancellor Trần Thủ Độ worried because he had profited the same circumstance of the Emperor Lý Huệ Tông to overthrow the Lý dynasty. Therefore, in 1237 Trần Thủ Độ decided to force Trần Liễu to give up his wife Princess Thuận Thiên for the Emperor when she had been already pregnant with Trần Liễu for three months. After the royal marriage, Thuận Thiên was entitled the new empress of the Trần dynasty while Chiêu Thánh was downgraded to princess. In the fury of losing his pregnant wife, Trần Liễu rose a revolt against the royal family, meanwhile, Thái Tông felt awkward about the situation and decided to become a monk in Yên Tử Mountain. Finally Trần Thủ Độ successfully persuaded Thái Tông to return to the throne and Trần Liễu had to surrender after judging that he could not stand with his fragile force. All soldiers who participated in this revolt were killed. Trần Thủ Độ even wished to behead Trần Liễu but was stopped by Thái Tông.

After the revolt, Trần Liễu was granted land in Yên Sinh (now Yên Hưng District, Quảng Ninh) and thus had the title Prince Yên Sinh (Yên Sinh vương or An Sinh vương, 安生王). He died in April 1251 at the age of 40. Before his death, Trần Liễu made his son King Hưng Đạo Trần Quốc Tuấn promise to revenge for him by taking over the throne but King Hưng Đạo did not keep this promise for the interest of the Trần dynasty.

== Family ==
Trần Liễu had two wives. The first was Princess Thuận Thiên whom Trần Liễu was forced to give up for his brother Thái Tông. The second wife of Trần Liễu was Lady Thiện Đạo who was entitled as Mother of the Nation (Quốc mẫu), her given name Nguyệt afterwards was made as taboo by an order of the Emperor for the purpose of honouring Trần Liễu and his wife. Besides his natural son Trần Quốc Khang who was Prince Tĩnh Quốc of Thái Tông, Trần Liễu had four children:

- Trần Tung, who eventually became Tuệ Trung Thượng Sĩ, one of the most significant Buddhist masters of medieval Vietnam.
- Prince Vũ Thành Trần Doãn who tried to defect with his family to the Song dynasty after the death of Trần Liễu but was arrested in the border.
- Prince Hưng Đạo Trần Quốc Tuấn, commander in chief of Đại Việt army during the second and third war of resistance against Mongol invasion.
- Empress Nguyên Thánh Thiên Cảm (元聖天感皇后) Trần Thị Thiều, empress of Trần Thánh Tông and natural mother of Trần Nhân Tông.
