= Trần Thị Dung =

National Matriarch Linh Từ

- National Matriarch Linh Từ

Empress consort of Lý dynasty
- Tenure: 1216–1225
- Predecessor: Empress Consort Đàm
- Successor: none

Empress mother of Lý dynasty
- Tenure: 1225
- Predecessor: Empress Mother Đàm
- Successor: none
- Born: 1193; Lưu Gia, Đại Việt
- Died: 1259 (aged 65–66); Thăng Long, Đại Việt
- Spouse: Lý Huệ Tông (1209–1226); Trần Thủ Độ (1226–1259)
- Issue: Empress Lý Chiêu Hoàng; Princess Thuận Thiên
Names
- Trần Thị Dung
Posthumous name
- National Matriarch Linh Từ (Linh Từ Quốc mẫu, 靈慈國母)
- House: Lý dynasty Trần dynasty
- Father: Trần Lý
- Religion: Buddhism

National Matriarch Linh Từ (Vietnamese: Linh Từ Quốc mẫu, chữ Hán: 靈慈國母) Trần Thị Dung (1193^{[?]}–1259) was the last empress and the last empress mother of the Lý dynasty. She was entitled by the Emperor Lý Huệ Tông as Empress Consort of the Lý dynasty from 1216 to 1225 before becoming Empress Mother of the Lý dynasty when her daughter Lý Phật Kim was enthroned as Lý Chiêu Hoàng in 1225. After Trần Thủ Độ, Trần Thị Dung's cousin, successfully overthrew the Lý dynasty and founded the Trần dynasty, Trần Thị Dung was downgraded to Princess Thiên Cực while her brother Trần Thừa's son became Trần Thái Tông, first emperor of the Trần dynasty. Before Lý Chiêu Hoàng, Trần Thị Dung had another daughter who eventually also became Empress Consort of the Trần dynasty, Empress Thuận Thiên.

The first husband of Trần Thị Dung, the former emperor Lý Huệ Tông, was killed in 1226 by order of Trần Thủ Độ, who afterwards married Trần Thị Dung, now Lady Linh Từ (vi:Linh Từ quốc mẫu) . During the troubled times of the Early Trần dynasty with the revolt of Trần Liễu, son-in-law of Trần Thị Dung, and the first Mongol invasion of Đại Việt, she had a significant role in the reconciliation between Trần Thái Tông and his brother Trần Liễu, National Matriarch Linh Từ also had many activities to help the royal family during the Mongol invasion. After her death in 1259, Trần Thị Dung was posthumously entitled as National Matriarch Linh Từ (vi:Linh Từ quốc mẫu). Trần Thị Dung's complicated biography was a fine example for the complex period of the Late Lý and Early Trần dynasty in the history of Vietnam.

== History ==
=== Lý dynasty period ===
Trần Thị Dung was born in Lưu Gia village (now Hưng Hà, Thái Bình) as daughter of Trần Lý, leader of Trần clan who made their great fortune by fishing, and younger sister of Trần Thừa, the future first Retired Emperor of the Trần dynasty. During the troubled time under the reign of Lý Cao Tông, the Crown Prince Lý Sảm sought refuge in Trần Lý's family and decided to marry the beautiful Trần Thị Dung. Afterward, it was Trần clan who helped Lý Cao Tông and Lý Sảm restored the throne in Thăng Long, therefore the Emperor appointed several members of Trần clan for high positions in royal court such as Tô Trung Từ who was uncle of Trần Thị Dung, or Trần Tự Khánh who was Trần Thừa's younger brother. In 1211 the Crown Prince Lý Sảm was enthroned as Lý Huệ Tông after the death of Lý Cao Tông, by then Trần clan's position began to rise in royal court.

In February 1211, Trần Thị Dung was entitled as Royal Consort (Vietnamese: Nguyên phi) of the Lý dynasty but was downgraded to palace maid (ngự nữ) one year after because the Emperor suspected the military action of general Trần Tự Khánh who was Trần Thị Dung's brother. After the successful pacification of two revolts by Trần Tự Khánh, the Emperor decided to make Trần Thị Dung as Lady Thuận Trinh (Thuận Trinh phu nhân) but she was still distrusted by the Empress Mother Đàm who tried to force Trần Thị Dung commit suicide several times. Surviving with the protection from Lý Huệ Tông, Lady Thuận Trinh gave birth for him the first child in June 1216 who later became Princess Thuận Thiên, wife of Trần Thị Dung's nephew Trần Liễu. Finally, Trần Thị Dung was entitled as Empress of the Lý dynasty in December 1216 while his brothers Trần Thừa and Trần Tự Khánh were also appointed for the most important positions in royal court regarding both civil and military matters. In September 1218 Trần Thị Dung had a second daughter, Princess Chiêu Thánh.

Being ill for a long time, Lý Huệ Tông ultimately decided to cede the throne to his youngest daughter, the Princess Chiêu Thánh, now the Empress Regnant Lý Chiêu Hoàng in December 1224 and Trần Thị Dung thus became the Empress Mother of the Lý dynasty. Chiêu Hoàng was only six at that time so every important decisions in royal court were made by Trần clan, profiting this circumstance, general of royal guard Trần Thủ Độ, who was Trần Thị Dung's cousin, arranged a marriage between Chiêu Hoàng and Trần Cảnh, the eight-year-old son of Trần Thừa and nephew of Trần Thị Dung. With Trần Cảnh being the Empress's husband, Trần Thủ Độ was finally able to overthrow the Lý dynasty by making Lý Chiêu Hoàng pass the throne to Trần Cảnh, now Trần Thái Tông, in 1225. After the coronation of Trần Cảnh, Lý Chiêu Hoàng was demoted to Empress Chiêu Thánh (Chiêu Thánh công chúa) and his mother to Princess Thiên Cực (Thiên Cực công chúa).

=== Trần dynasty period ===
After the collapse of the Lý dynasty, Trần Thủ Độ was still afraid that newly found ruling of the Trần dynasty might be taken over by its political opponents, therefore he continued to eliminate member of Lý royal family by his ruthless method. On October 8 of Lunar calendar 1226, he forced the former emperor Lý Huệ Tông, who had already gotten rid of power to become a monk, to commit suicide and married Trần Thị Dung, Huệ Tông's former empress and his own cousin. These actions of Trần Thủ Độ was criticized by Ngô Sĩ Liên in his Đại Việt sử kí toàn thư as an inhumane decision despite his initial motive of reinforcing the reign of Trần Thái Tông.

According to the Đại Việt sử kí toàn thư, Thái Tông and his wife the Empress Chiêu Thánh did not have their first son for a while, this situation in royal family made grand chancellor Trần Thủ Độ worried because he had profited the same circumstance of the Emperor Lý Huệ Tông to overthrow the Lý dynasty. Therefore, in 1236 Trần Thủ Độ decided to force Trần Liễu to give up his wife Princess Thuận Thiên for the Emperor when she had been already pregnant Trần Quốc Khang for three months. After the royal marriage, Thuận Thiên was entitled the new empress of the Trần dynasty while Chiêu Thánh was downgraded to princess. In the fury of losing his pregnant wife, Trần Liễu rose a revolt against the royal family, meanwhile Thái Tông felt awkward about the situation and decided to become a monk in Yên Tử Mountain. Finally, Trần Thủ Độ successfully persuaded Thái Tông to return to the throne and Trần Liễu had to surrender after judging that he could not stand with his fragile force. All soldiers who participated in this revolt were killed, Trần Thủ Độ even wanted to behead Trần Liễu but was stopped by Thái Tông. After this chaotic event, Trần Thị Dung was praised for her important role in the reconciliation between Trần Thái Tông and his brother Trần Liễu. During the first Mongol invasion of Đại Việt, Trần Thị Dung also helped the Emperor with governing the royal family.

Trần Thị Dung died in January 1259. She was entitled as Mother of the Nation Lady Linh Từ (Linh Từ Quốc mẫu) because Trần Thái Tông respected her former title as Empress of the Lý dynasty so the Emperor still considered her equal to the position of Empress of the Trần dynasty.

== Legacy ==
Trần Thị Dung's complicated biography was a fine example for the complex period of the Late Lý and Early Trần dynasty in the history of Vietnam. Reflecting her role in the Lý and Trần dynasty, the historian Ngô Sĩ Liên wrote that Trần Thị Dung did have an active role in reinforcing the newly found reign of the Trần dynasty, especially with the matter of Trần Thái Tông-Trần Liễu clash and during the war of resistance of the Trần dynasty against the Mongol invasion. However, being the last empress and the last empress mother of the Lý dynasty, she contributed nothing to the ruling of the Lý dynasty and even married Trần Thủ Độ, who forced her first husband Lý Huệ Tông commit suicide, a decision that was criticized in several historical books.

== Family ==
Trần Hấp
Trần Lý	Trần Hoằng Nghi
Trần Thừa	Trần Tự Khánh	Lý Huệ Tông	Trần Thị Dung	Trần Thủ Độ
Trần Liễu	Princess Thuận Thiên
Trần Thái Tông	Princess Chiêu Thánh

Trần Thị Dung House of Lý Died: 1259
Regnal titles
Preceded by Empress Đàm	Empress of Lý dynasty 1216–1225	Succeeded by none
Preceded by Empress Mother Đàm	Empress Mother of Lý dynasty 1225	Succeeded by none
