= Tuệ Trung =

Tuệ Trung Thượng Sĩ (慧中上士) (1230–1291) was an influential Buddhist lay practitioner and skilled poet of the Thiền (Zen) tradition during the Tran Dynasty in Vietnam. Tue Trung authored treatises on Pure Land and Thien teachings.

== Biography ==
In his early years, Tue Trung was the eldest son in a branch of the royal clan of Tran with the lay name of Trần Tung (陳嵩). He was the elder brother of the Queen of Vietnam, Nguyên Thánh Thiên Cảm (wife of King Tran Thanh Tong and mother of King Trần Nhân Tông), and of the famous general-saint Trần Hưng Đạo.

In the Tran campaigns that confronted the Sino-Mongolian invasion of Kublai Khan, in 1285 and 1288, Tran Tung was among the generals who repelled the Mongol invasions.

When the campaigns had concluded, he retreated from worldly activities and became a Buddhist practitioner.

His teacher was a monk named Tieu Dao, a representative of the Wu Yantong lineage of Buddhism, named for its founder, a student of Baizhang Huaihai who had come to Vietnam. Tue Trung is considered Tieu Dao's best pupil. He would not leave home for monastery, but his vast education and his ability to explain the Buddhist doctrine made him the most famous Buddhist teacher of his time.

In his turn, Tue Trung made his spiritual heir Trần Nhân Tông, the king who after abdication founded the Trúc Lâm (Bamboo Grove) school, the tradition of Buddhism that is sometimes considered to be the first Vietnamese-born Buddhist tradition.

Via Trần Nhân Tông, Tue Trung is part of the lineage of such modern Buddhist masters as Thích Nhất Hạnh.

== Teaching and heritage ==
Being essentially a Chan Buddhist tradition, the teaching of Tue Trung emphasized non-duality up to demonstrative negation of the value of formal meditation and rituals.

Tue Trung's magnum opus, The Analects of Tue Trung Thuong Si, is a Buddhist text written in form of dialogue, which survives to this day. Several of Tue Trung's poems are still cited.

Tue Trung became a legendary master often referred to in Buddhist lectures and literature. The most popular is the example of him stepping on horse's manure in silent reply to the question of the nature of Buddhism. He is being actively referred to as a central Vietnamese Buddhist image to this day.
