= Thuận Thiên (Trần dynasty empress) =

Thuận Thiên Hoàng hậu 順天皇后
- Empress Thuận Thiên

Empress Consort of the Trần dynasty
- Reign: 1237–1248
- Predecessor: Empress Chiêu Thánh
- Born: 1216; Cửu Liên, Vietnam
- Died: 1248 (aged 31–32); Thăng Long, Vietnam
- Spouse: Trần Liễu (?–1237); Trần Thái Tông (1237–1248)
- Issue: With Trần Liễu: Prince Vũ Thành Trần Doãn, Prince Tĩnh Quốc Trần Quốc Khang; With Trần Thái Tông: Emperor Trần Thánh Tông, Prince Chiêu Minh Trần Quang Khải
Names
- Lý Oánh (李莹)
Posthumous name
- Empress Dowager Hiển Từ Thuận Thiên (顯慈順天皇太后)
- House: Lý dynasty Trần dynasty
- Father: Lý Huệ Tông
- Mother: Trần Thị Dung
- Religion: Buddhism

Empress Thuận Thiên (Lý Oánh 李莹) (1216–1248) was the second empress of Trần dynasty, she succeeded her younger sister Empress Chiêu Thánh in 1237 by an arrangement of Trần Thủ Độ in which Prince Hoài Trần Liễu was forced to give up his 3-month pregnant wife Princess Thuận Thiên to the Emperor Trần Thái Tông. Thuận Thiên was born in the royal family of the Lý dynasty as the first child of the Emperor Lý Huệ Tông and Lady Thuận Trinh Trần Thị Dung with whom she witnessed the turbulent time of the Late Lý and Early Trần Dynasty. She was mother of four princes including the second emperor of the Trần Dynasty Trần Thánh Tông and grand chancellor Prince Chiêu Minh Trần Quang Khải.

== Biography ==
Thuận Thiên was born as Lý Ngọc Oanh, entitled as Princess Thuận Thiên, the first child of the Emperor Lý Huệ Tông and his wife Lady Thuận Trinh Trần Thị Dung. Thuận Thiên was born not in royal palace but in Cửu Liên Marsh (now Yên Mỹ District, Hưng Yên) in June 1216 when Lý Huệ Tông and Lady Thuận Trinh escaped capital Thăng Long to the garrison of general Trần Tự Khánh, Trần Thị Dung's brother, in order to avoid the intention of killing Lady Thuận Trinh by Empress Mother Đàm who always distrusted her as a member of the powerful Trần clan. Thuận Thiên had a younger sister, Princess Chiêu Thánh, who ultimately became the Empress Regnant Lý Chiêu Hoàng, the last emperor of the Lý dynasty. During the reign of Huệ Tông and Chiêu Hoàng, Thuận Thiên married to Prince Phụng Càn (Vietnamese: Phụng Càn vương) Trần Liễu who was her cousin.

In 1226, the Trần clan took over the throne of the Lý Dynasty and created the Trần dynasty, as a result the Empress Regnant Lý Chiêu Hoàng was downgraded to Empress Chiêu Thánh of the Emperor Trần Thái Tông while Chiêu Hoàng and Thuận Thiên's father, Lý Hiển Tông was forced by grand chancellor Trần Thủ Độ to commit suicide in 1226.

According to Đại Việt sử kí toàn thư, Thái Tông and his wife the Empress Chiêu Thánh did not have their first son for a while, this situation in royal family made grand chancellor Trần Thủ Độ worried because he had profited the same circumstance of the Emperor Lý Huệ Tông to overthrow the Lý dynasty. Therefore, in 1237 Trần Thủ Độ decided to force Trần Liễu to give up his wife Princess Thuận Thiên for the Emperor when she had been already pregnant with Trần Quốc Khang for three months. After the royal marriage, Thuận Thiên was entitled the new empress of the Trần Dynasty while Chiêu Thánh was downgraded to princess. In the fury of losing his pregnant wife, Trần Liễu rose a revolt against the royal family, meanwhile Thái Tông felt awkward about the situation and decided to become a monk in Yên Tử Mountain. Finally Trần Thủ Độ successfully persuaded Thái Tông to return to the throne and Trần Liễu had to surrender after judging that he could not stand with his fragile force. All soldiers who participated in this revolt were killed, Trần Thủ Độ even wanted to behead Trần Liễu but was stopped by Thái Tông. Vietnamese historians in feudal era such as Ngô Sĩ Liên or Phan Phu Tiên often criticized decisions of Trần Thủ Độ and Trần Thái Tông in this event and considered it as origin for the downfall of the Trần Dynasty afterwards during the reign of Trần Dụ Tông.

Empress Thuận Thiên died in June 1248 at the age of 32. She was posthumously entitled as Empress Mother Hiển Từ Thuận Thiên (Hiển Từ Thuận Thiên Hoàng thái hậu).

== Clan ==
With her first husband Trần Liễu, Thuận Thiên had two children, Prince Vũ Thành Trần Doãn, who unsuccessfully tried to escape to the Song dynasty after the death of her mother, and Prince Tĩnh Quốc Trần Quốc Khang. Empress Thuận Thiên also gave birth for Trần Thái Tông two princes, crown prince Trần Hoảng, who eventually became the Emperor Trần Thánh Tông, and Prince Chiêu Minh Trần Quang Khải who was grand chancellor in royal court of the Trần Dynasty for many years.
