= Trần Quốc Khang =

Trần Quốc Khang 陳國康
- Prince Tĩnh Quốc
- Born: 1237; Thang Long, Đại Việt
- Died: 1300 (aged 62–63); Thăng Long, Đại Việt
- House: Trần dynasty
- Father: Trần Thái Tông (in name); Trần Liễu (by nature)
- Mother: Princess Thuận Thiên

Prince Tĩnh Quốc Trần Quốc Khang (1237–1300) was the first prince of the Emperor Trần Thái Tông, the eldest brother of Trần Thánh Tông and princes Trần Quang Khải, Trần Ích Tắc and Trần Nhật Duật. Although a son of Thái Tông in name, Trần Quốc Khang's father was actually Prince Hoài Trần Liễu, who was forced by grand chancellor Trần Thủ Độ to give up his wife, Princess Thuận Thiên, to his younger brother Thái Tông when she was already pregnant with Trần Quốc Khang. For this reason, Trần Quốc Khang was not chosen as successor of Thái Tông for the throne, and he did not have a significant role in royal court either, as his younger brothers did. Afterwards he was appointed as governor of Nghệ An, a position that his descendants inherited. Since Trần Quốc Khang was in fact a son of Trần Liễu, he was also a natural brother of general Trần Hưng Đạo, commander-in-chief of Đại Việt army.

== Background ==
Trần Quốc Khang was born in 1237 as the first son of the Emperor Trần Thái Tông and his new empress Thuận Thiên. According to Đại Việt sử kí toàn thư, Thái Tông and his wife, the Empress Chiêu Thánh, did not have their first son for a while. This situation made grand chancellor Trần Thủ Độ worried, because he had profited from the same circumstance with the Emperor Lý Huệ Tông to overthrow the Lý dynasty and create the Trần dynasty. Therefore, Trần Thủ Độ decided to force Thái Tông's elder brother, Prince Hoài Trần Liễu, to give up his wife Princess Thuận Thiên for the Emperor when she had been already pregnant with Trần Quốc Khang for three months. After the royal marriage, Thuận Thiên was styled the new empress of the Trần dynasty, while Chiêu Thánh was downgraded to princess. In the fury of losing his pregnant wife, Trần Liễu rose a revolt against the royal family, and Thái Tông felt awkward about the situation and decided to become a monk in Yên Tử Mountain. The stable state was only restored when Trần Thủ Độ successfully persuaded Thái Tông to return to the throne and put down Trần Liễu's revolt. Vietnamese historians in the feudal era, such as Ngô Sĩ Liên or Phan Phu Tiên, often criticized decisions of Trần Thủ Độ and Trần Thái Tông in this event and considered it as the root cause for the downfall of the Trần dynasty afterwards, during the reign of Trần Dụ Tông.

After the birth of Quốc Khang, Thái Tông and the Empress Thuận Thiên had two other sons, crown prince Trần Hoảng, who eventually became the Emperor Trần Thánh Tông, and Prince Chiêu Minh Trần Quang Khải. Thái Tông also had several sons with his concubines, such as Prince Chiêu Quốc Trần Ích Tắc and Prince Chiêu Văn Trần Nhật Duật.

== History ==
Unlike his famous brothers Trần Quang Khải or Trần Nhật Duật, Prince Tĩnh Quốc (Vietnamese: Tĩnh Quốc vương) Trần Quốc Khang was not an important figure in the royal court during Đại Việt's war of resistance against the Mongol invasion. While Trần Quang Khải was appointed by the Emperor Trần Thánh Tông as minister at age 20, Trần Quốc Khang was not considered capable for an important position and thus he held only some nominal high-ranking title, but without real power in the royal court. However, Prince Tĩnh Quốc always lived in good term with his brothers. It was said that one time when the Retired Emperor Thái Tông wore a white cotton coat, Trần Quốc Khang tried to make the Retired Emperor award him this coat by a dance and finally achieved his purpose, but when the Emperor also wanted to get the coat by another dance, Prince Tĩnh Quốc said: "Even for the most precious thing, the throne, Your Majesty's humble subject [Quốc Khang] did not want to fight with the second brother [Thánh Tông]. Now the Retired Emperor awards me this negligible coat and the second brother still wants to deprive me of it?" His answer was praised by Thái Tông: "So you think that the throne has the same value as this mediocre coat."

In 1269, Trần Quốc Khang was appointed as commander in chief (thượng tướng quân) to govern the southern frontier province Nghệ An. Prince Tĩnh Quốc decided to build his palace there, which was so luxurious that the Emperor knew about its reputation. Ultimately Prince Tĩnh Quốc transformed his palace into a Buddhist pagoda which still remains today with the name Thông Pagoda. During the invasion of the Yuan dynasty in Đại Việt, Trần Quốc Khang's son, Marquis Chương Hiến (Chương Hiến hầu) Trần Kiện surrendered to Kublai Khan's prince Toghan. He was one of the highest ranking defectors of the Trần dynasty, just lower than Trần Ích Tắc, Trần Quốc Khang's younger brother. Before he could flee to northern border, Trần Kiện was killed in February 1285 by Nguyễn Địa Lô, house servant of Trần Hưng Đạo who incidentally was a son of Trần Liễu and thus a natural brother of Trần Quốc Khang.

Prince Tĩnh Quốc Trần Quốc Khang died in March 1300 at the age of 63. Afterwards, his position of governor of Nghệ An was inherited by his descendants for several generations.
