= Nguyễn Phi Khanh =

Nguyễn Phi Khanh (born Nguyễn Ứng Long; His year of birth is unknown although some record says 1355, 1428 or 1429) was a scholar of Hanlin Academy. He was also the father of the well-known poet Nguyễn Trãi. His hometown was Chí Linh District, Hải Dương. He was Doctor of Philosophy in Trần Duệ Tông age but was not appointed to any official position. When Hồ Quý Ly usurped the throne, he was promoted as a scholar of Hanlin Academy.

== Bibliography ==
- Phi Khanh Nguyẽ̂n (1981). Thơ văn Nguyễn Phi Khanh: (tuyển). Văn Học.
