= Lý Chiêu Hoàng =

Empress regnant of Vietnam from 1224 to 1225

Lý Chiêu Hoàng 李昭皇
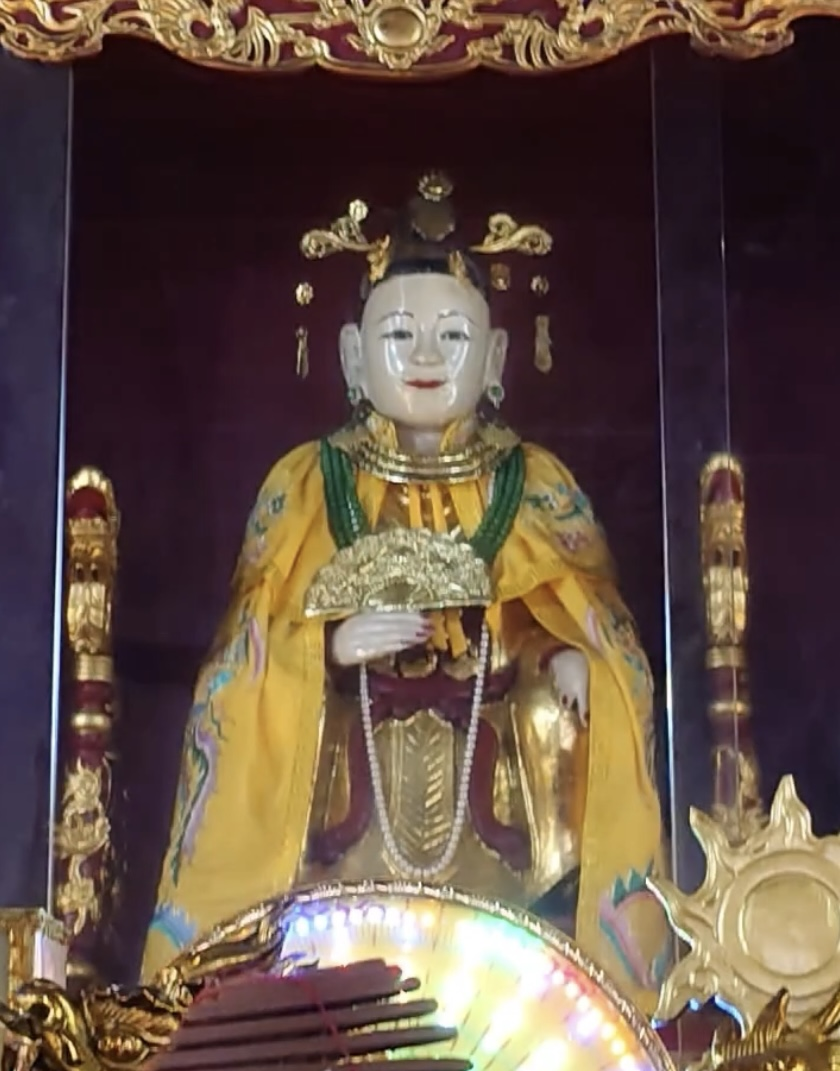

Empress of Đại Việt
- Reign: 1224–1225
- Predecessor: Lý Huệ Tông
- Successor: None (dynasty collapsed); Trần Thái Tông (as emperor of the Trần dynasty)
- Regent: Trần Thủ Độ

Empress consort of Đại Việt
- Tenure: 1225–1237
- Successor: Empress Thuận Thiên
- Born: 15 September 1218; Thăng Long
- Died: 8 March 1278 (aged 60); Cổ Pháp, Đại Việt
- Burial: Thọ Tomb
- Spouse: Trần Thái Tông (1224–1237); Lê Phụ Trần (1258–1278)
- Issue: With Trần Thái Tông: Crown Prince Trần Trịnh; With Lê Phụ Trần: Marquis of Thượng vị Lê Tông; Princess Ứng Thụy Lê Ngọc Khuê
Names
- Lý Phật Kim (李佛金); Lý Thiên Hinh (李天馨)
Era dates
- Thiên Chương Hữu Đạo (天彰有道) (1224–1225)
Posthumous name
- Chiêu Hoàng đế (昭皇帝)
- House: Lý (by birth); Trần (by marriage)
- Father: Lý Huệ Tông
- Mother: Trần Thị Dung
- Religion: Buddhism

- Posthumous name
- Vietnamese alphabet: Chiêu Hoàng đế
- Chữ Hán: 昭皇帝

- Personal name
- Vietnamese alphabet: Lý Phật Kim
- Chữ Hán: 李佛金

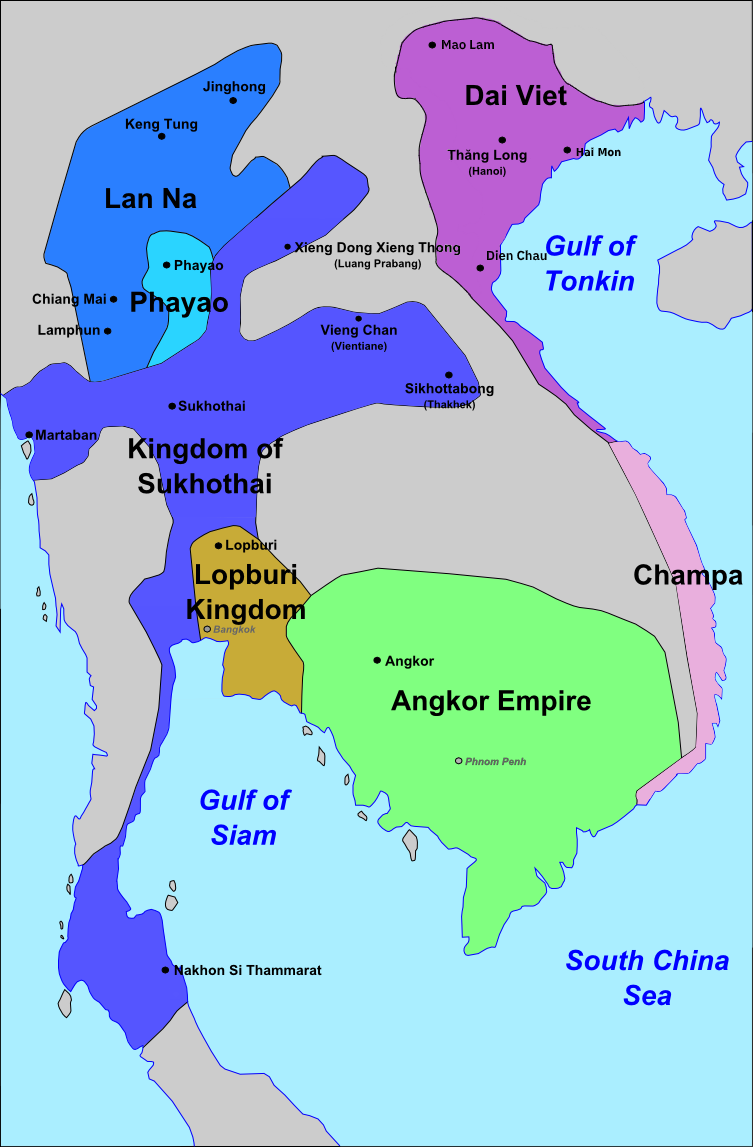
Southeast Asia in the 13th century; Lý Chiêu Hoàng ruled Dai Viet, in the northeast of the map.

Lý Chiêu Hoàng ([li˦˥ ciə̯w˧˧ hwaːŋ˨˩] chữ Hán: 李昭皇, September 1218 – 1278), personal name Lý Phật Kim (李佛金) later renamed to Lý Thiên Hinh (李天馨), was the ninth and last sovereign of the Lý dynasty, empress of Đại Việt from 1224 to 1225. She is the only empress regnant in Vietnamese history and the last Vietnamese female monarch (Trưng Trắc is the first female monarch and the first queen regnant).

== Biography ==
Lý Phật Kim was born in September of Lunar calendar 1218 with courtesy name Thiên Hinh (天馨), pen name Chiêu Thánh (昭聖), second child of the Emperor Lý Huệ Tông and the Empress Trần Thị Dung. She had an elder sister, Princess Thuận Thiên, who was born in 1216 and later married to Prince Phụng Càn (Vietnamese: Phụng Càn vương) Trần Liễu, Lý Phật Kim herself was entitled as Princess Chiêu Thánh (昭 聖 公主), the only available successor for the throne.

Having been mentally ill for a long time, the Emperor Lý Huệ Tông ultimately decided to cede the throne of the Lý dynasty to crown princess Lý Chiêu Hoàng in October of Lunar calendar, 1224. Lý Chiêu Hoàng thus became the only empress regnant in history of Vietnam. This decision of Lý Huệ Tông was considered by the historian Ngô Sĩ Liên as the crucial factor leading to the collapse of the Lý dynasty, because if he had chosen a capable member of the royal family instead of his young princess, the situation for the dynasty could have been different.

=== As empress regnant ===
Succeeding to the throne at the age of only six, Lý Chiêu Hoàng ruled under the total influence of Commander of Royal Guard Trần Thủ Độ and other members of the Trần clan, who began to take over power in the royal court during the reign of Lý Huệ Tông. Even the Empress Regnant's servants were chosen by Trần Thủ Độ, so that trusted servants of Lý Chiêu Hoàng all came from the Trần clan, such as Trần Bất Cập, Trần Thiêm or Trần Thủ Độ's 7-year-old nephew Trần Cảnh. When Trần Cảnh informed Trần Thủ Độ that the Empress Regnant seemed to have affection towards him, the leader of the Trần clan immediately decided to use this chance to carry out his plot of overthrowing the Lý dynasty and founding his clan's own dynasty. Firstly Trần Thủ Độ moved the whole Trần clan to the royal palace and arranged a secret marriage between Lý Chiêu Hoàng and Trần Cảnh there, without the appearance of any mandarin or member of the Lý royal family. The royal marriage took place in October or November 1225, (Note: Đại Việt sử ký toàn thư did not cite the exact date of the marriage but the event was accounted from October to the end of November 1225.) when Lý Chiêu Hoàng and Trần Cảnh were both only 7 years old. (Note: Lý Chiêu Hoàng and Trần Cảnh were born in the same year, 1218.) After that, he announced the fait accompli to the royal court and made Lý Chiêu Hoàng cede the throne to her newly married husband for the reason that she was not capable for the position, so Trần Cảnh was chosen as her successor. Hence, the 216-year reign of the Lý dynasty was ended and the new Trần dynasty was created on the first day of the twelfth lunar month, 1225 (31 December 1225). The only era name of the Empress Regnant was Thiên Chương Hữu Đạo (天 彰 有 道).

After the coronation of Trần Cảnh, now Trần Thái Tông, Lý Chiêu Hoàng was downgraded to Empress Consort Chiêu Thánh (Chiêu Thánh hoàng hậu) in January 1226. Although Trần Thừa, father of the new emperor, acted as Regent in the royal court, it was the grand chancellor Trần Thủ Độ who held absolute power in the court and decided both military and civil matters of the country. Still afraid that the newly founded rule of the Trần dynasty might be overthrown by its political opponents, Trần Thủ Độ continued to eliminate members of the Lý royal family by his ruthless method. The grand chancellor ordered Lý Chiêu Hoàng's father, Lý Huệ Tông, to commit suicide on 8 October of Lunar calendar 1226 while married Lý Chiêu Hoàng's mother, Empress Trần Thị Dung, now Princess Thiên Cực. These actions of Trần Thủ Độ were criticized by Ngô Sĩ Liên in his Đại Việt sử kí toàn thư as an inhumane decision, despite his initial motive of reinforcing the reign of Trần Thái Tông. Not satisfied with the death of Huệ Tông, Trần Thủ Độ decided to kill off all members of the Lý royal family in August 1232 during the death anniversary of Lý emperors held in Thái Đường, Hoa Lâm. The authenticity of this event was challenged by the historian Ngô Sĩ Liên because a member of the Lý clan was still appointed as general by Trần Anh Tông and there was no account of this event in Phan Phu Tiên's historical record.

=== As empress consort and princess ===
According to Đại Việt sử kí toàn thư, Empress Chiêu Thánh could not bear a child for the Emperor for a while; this situation in the royal family worried grand chancellor Trần Thủ Độ because he had exploited the same situation involving the Emperor Lý Huệ Tông to overthrow the Lý dynasty. Therefore, in 1237 Trần Thủ Độ decided to force Trần Liễu to give up his wife Princess Thuận Thiên for the Emperor when she had already been pregnant with Trần Quốc Khang for three months. After the royal marriage, Thuận Thiên was made the new empress of the Trần dynasty while Chiêu Thánh was downgraded to princess. In fury at losing his pregnant wife, Trần Liễu raised a revolt against the royal family; meanwhile Thái Tông felt awkward about the situation and decided to become a monk in Yên Tử Mountain. Eventually Trần Thủ Độ persuaded Thái Tông to return to the throne and Trần Liễu surrendered after judging that he could not prevail with his small force. All the soldiers who participated in this revolt were killed; Trần Thủ Độ even wanted to behead Trần Liễu but was stopped by Thái Tông. Vietnamese historians in feudal era such as Ngô Sĩ Liên or Phan Phu Tiên often criticized the decisions of Trần Thủ Độ and Trần Thái Tông in this situation and considered it the origin of the downfall of the Trần dynasty afterwards during the reign of Trần Dụ Tông.

In 1258, Thái Tông decided to remarry Princess Chiêu Thánh to the general Lê Phụ Trần because he had an essential role in the victory of Đại Việt over the first Mongol invasion. This event was one more time criticized in historical books for the lack of moral code in marriage during the Early Trần period. Princess Chiêu Thánh died in Cổ Pháp in March 1278 at the age of 61. With the second husband Lê Phụ Trần, she had two children, Marquis Lê Tông and Princess Ứng Thụy Lê Khuê.

== Legacy ==
Because of her role in the collapse of the Lý dynasty (as people acknowledged at that time), Lý Chiêu Hoàng was not worshipped along with her ancestors, and the eight previous emperors of the Lý dynasty, at the Lý Bát Đế Temple (Bắc Ninh); her ancestral tablet was only placed in a nearby shrine which was smaller than the main temple. From the beginning of 2009, this shrine was renovated on a large scale on the occasion of the millenary anniversary of Hanoi which was founded by the Lý dynasty. This restoration was criticized by several newspapers and residents because almost all architectural features at the shrine were demolished and totally rebuilt even though the shrine was already credited as a national historical relic of Vietnam. Responding to the criticism, the official responsible for this renovation stated that the temple was not as ancient as others thought and they had to rebuild from the foundation because the shrine was in very bad shape and reconstruction was necessary.

== Notes ==
Lý Chiêu Hoàng House of Lý Born: 1218 Died: 1278
Regnal titles
Preceded by Lý Huệ Tông	Empress of Dai Viet; 1224–1225	Succeeded by Trần Thái Tông
Preceded by Lý Huệ Tông	Empress of the Lý dynasty 1224–1225	Lý dynasty overthrown
Preceded by Empress Trần Thị Dung	Empress consort of Dai Viet; 1225–1237	Succeeded by Empress Thuận Thiên
