= Battle of Chương Dương =

1285 battle in the Second Mongol–Vietnamese War

Battle of Chương Dương (1285)
- Part of the Second Mongol–Vietnamese War
Date	24 June 1285
Location	Chương Dương, Thường Tín District, Hanoi 20.871470°N 105.864399°E
Result	Decisive Vietnamese victory

Belligerents
Đại Việt	Yuan dynasty

Commanders and leaders
Prince Trần Quốc Tuấn; Trần Quang Khải	Sogetu †

The Battle of Chương Dương (1285) was fought between joint Cham–Vietnamese forces, led by Prince Trần Quốc Tuấn and Duke Trần Quang Khải against the Mongol-led Yuan force under the Mongol general Sogetu in late June 1285. The battle took place at the Chương Dương port (modern-day Thường Tín District, Hanoi) on the Red River. Most of the Yuan warships were burned or sunk while Sogetu was killed in battle.
