= An Tư =

Vietnamese princess (born 1267)

- Princess
- Born: 安姿; Thăng Long, Đại Việt
- Died: China
- Spouse: Toghon
- Issue: two children
Names
- An Tư
- Dynasty: Trần
- Father: Trần Thái Tông

An Tư (chữ Hán: 安姿, 1267 – ?), was a princess during the Trần dynasty (1225–1400), the youngest offspring of emperor Trần Thái Tông. The exact year of her birth and death are unknown. The Đại Việt sử kí toàn thư (1675) only records that “the servants were ordered to give Princess An Tư to Togon to buy time”.

== Biography ==
In early 1285, the Mongols invaded Vietnam for a second time. Togon led his army to attack Gia Lâm, and surrounded the Vietnamese capital, Hanoi. Grand emperor Trần Thánh Tông and emperor Trần Nhân Tông went to Tam Trĩ by means of a small boat, while the official royal boat went to Ngọc Sơn to mislead the invaders, but they were discovered. On March 9, Yuan marine troops surrounded Tam Trĩ and almost captured both the grand emperor and the emperor. Needing time to consolidate and organize the army and slow down the pace of the Mongol army, Thánh Tông offered his younger sister, princess An Tư, to Togon, as a gift.

After that, in April, the Trần army began to counter-attack, gaining multiple victories. The Yuan army completely lost. Togon had to hide in a bronze pot to cross the border. The official history mentions An Tư only once. But in An Nam chí lược, written by Lê Tắc, Trần Kiện's servant, following his master to China, wrote, "Crown prince [Togon] married a Trần woman, had two children."

The modern historical novel Princess An Tư, written by Nguyễn Huy Tưởng, and also a play were based on this story.
