= Trần Thủ Độ =

Trần Thủ Độ 陳守度
- Prince Trung Vũ
- Born: 1194; Long Hưng, Đại Việt
- Died: 1264 (aged 69–70); Thăng Long, Đại Việt
- Spouse: Lady Linh Từ Trần Thị Dung
- House: Trần dynasty
- Father: Trần Quả

Prince Trung Vũ Trần Thủ Độ (chữ Hán: 陳守度, 1194–1264) was a general and leader of the Trần clan during the reign of Lý Huệ Tông and Lý Chiêu Hoàng of Vietnam. He was the chief mastermind between the overthrowal the Lý dynasty and the establishment of the Trần dynasty by his arrangement of marriage between the Empress Regnant Chiêu Hoàng and his nephew Trần Cảnh. He later forced Lý Chiêu Hoàng to abdicate the throne to Trần Cảnh, who became emperor as Trần Thái Tông. Trần Thủ Độ was appointed grand chancellor and regent to the emperor.

As the most powerful figure in the Trần royal family and court, Trần Thủ Độ was responsible for both civil and military matters in Đại Việt; his successful governance was considered by historical books as the crucial factor that not only led to the stability of the early Trần dynasty but also contributed to the victory of Đại Việt over the first Mongol invasion. Although a skilled and devoted official of the Trần dynasty, Trần Thủ Độ still remains a controversial figure in the history of Vietnam for his ruthlessness in massacring members of the deposed Lý royal family, and for his responsibility in the forced marriage between Trần Thái Tông and his brother Trần Liễu's wife, Princess Thuận Thiên, which was highly criticized by later historians.

== Background ==
Trần Thủ Độ was born in 1194 as the third son of Trần Quả, a member of the Trần clan in Lưu Gia village (now Hưng Hà, Thái Bình). The Trần clan had made a great fortune by fishing for generations.

In 1209, the emperor Lý Cao Tông was overthrown by the general Quách Bốc. The emperor and his court sought refuge at the home of Trần Lý, Trần Thủ Độ's uncle. The emperor's son, Crown Prince Lý Sảm decided to marry Trần Lý's daughter Trần Thị Dung later that year. As a result of this marriage, the Trần clan assisted the emperor in retaking the capital from Quách Bốc. As a reward, the emperor granted several members of the Trần clan positions at the imperial court: they included Tô Trung Từ, who was uncle of Trần Thị Dung, as well as Trần Tự Khánh and Trần Thừa who were Trần Lý's sons. In 1211, the emperor died and Lý Sảm was enthroned as Lý Huệ Tông; the power of the Trần clan's power at court continued to increase. After the death of Trần Tự Khánh in 1223, Trần Thừa was appointed to the highest military position at the royal court, while his cousin Trần Thủ Độ took charge of the royal guard (Vietnamese: Điện tiền chỉ huy sứ).

== Rise to power ==
=== Overthrowing the Lý dynasty ===
In October 1224, Lý Huệ Tông grew mentally ill and ceded the throne to his youngest daughter, the Princess Chiêu Thánh, now the Empress Regnant Lý Chiêu Hoàng. Chiêu Hoàng was only six at that time, and all important decisions in royal court were made by members of the Trần clan. Trần Thủ Độ arranged a marriage between Chiêu Hoàng and Trần Cảnh, the six-year-old son of Trần Thừa. With Trần Cảnh being the Empress Regnant's husband, Trần Thủ Độ was able to overthrow the Lý dynasty by making Lý Chiêu Hoàng yield the throne to Trần Cảnh, now Trần Thái Tông, in 1225. After the coronation of his son, Trần Thừa acted as Regent of the Emperor, but it was Trần Thủ Độ who served as Grand Chancellor (Vietnamese: thái sư) and decided both military and civil matters in the royal court; he was respectfully called by Trần Thái Tông as Father of the Nation (Quốc thượng phụ).

After the collapse of the Lý dynasty, Trần Thủ Độ was afraid that the newly established Trần dynasty might be dislodged by its political opponents and thus ruthlessly conspired to eliminate members of Lý royal family. On the eighth day of the tenth lunar month (October 30) 1226, he forced the former emperor Lý Huệ Tông, who had already abdicated his power, to commit suicide. Trần Thủ Độ married Huệ Tông's former empress, Princess Thiên Cực Trần Thị Dung, who was also Trần Thủ Độ's cousin. These actions were criticized by historian Ngô Sĩ Liên in his Đại Việt sử kí toàn thư as inhumane, though their purpose was to reinforce the reign of Trần Thái Tông. It has been alleged that Trần Thủ Độ decided to massacre members of the Lý royal family in August 1232 during the death anniversary of Lý emperors held in Thái Đường, Hoa Lâm (now Nam Trực, Nam Định). However, the authenticity of this account was challenged by the historian Ngô Sĩ Liên, because a member of the Lý clan was still appointed as general by Trần Anh Tông and there is no mention this event in Phan Phu Tiên's historical record.

=== Strengthening the reign of Trần Thái Tông ===
Trần Thái Tông was enthroned when he was only an 8-year-old boy and there were several revolts in Đại Việt at that time, so Trần Thủ Độ had to devote all of his efforts to consolidating the rule of the new Emperor in the royal court and over the country. Right after the coronation of the Emperor in 1226, Nguyễn Nộn and Đoàn Thượng rose a revolt in the mountainous region of Bắc Giang and Hải Dương, by both military and diplomatic measures such as sending army to pacify them or even awarding two leaders of the revolt by the title Prince (Vương), Trần Thủ Độ was able to put down this revolt in 1229.

According to Đại Việt sử kí toàn thư, Thái Tông and his wife, the Empress Chiêu Thánh, did not have their first son for a while, so this situation in the royal family made grand chancellor Trần Thủ Độ worried because he had profited in the same circumstances of the Emperor Lý Huệ Tông to overthrow the Lý dynasty. Therefore, in 1237 Trần Thủ Độ decided to force Trần Liễu to give up his wife Princess Thuận Thiên for the Emperor when she had been already pregnant with Trần Quốc Khang for three months. After the royal marriage, Thuận Thiên was entitled the new empress of the Trần dynasty while Chiêu Thánh was downgraded to princess. In the fury of losing his pregnant wife, Trần Liễu rose in revolt against the royal family.Emperor Thái Tông felt awkward about the situation and decided to become a monk in Yên Tử Mountain. Finally Trần Thủ Độ successfully persuaded Thái Tông to return to the throne and Trần Liễu had to surrender after judging that he could not stand with his fragile force. All soldiers who participated in this revolt were killed, and Trần Thủ Độ even wanted to behead Trần Liễu but was stopped by Emperor Thái Tông. Vietnamese historians in dynastic era such as Ngô Sĩ Liên or Phan Phu Tiên often criticized decisions of Trần Thủ Độ and Trần Thái Tông in this event and considered it as origin for the downfall of the Trần dynasty afterwards during the reign of Trần Dụ Tông.

In 1258, the Trần dynasty had to face the first Mongol invasion. In the beginning, the Đại Việt army suffered several defeats by an overwhelming force which had already conquered vast areas of Asia. Several high-ranking officials of the Trần dynasty were so scared that Prince Khâm Thiên Trần Nhật Hiệu, younger brother of Thái Tông, even suggested to the Emperor that they might escape from Đại Việt to the Song Empire. When the concerned emperor asked Trần Thủ Độ about the situation of the Trần Dynasty, the grand chancellor answered with a famous phrase:

As long as my head has not fallen down, Your Majesty please do not worry.

Indeed, the Trần dynasty was able to counterattack and ultimately drive the Mongols out of Đại Việt in 1258.

Until his death in January 1264, Trần Thủ Độ still actively contributed to the royal court. He was posthumously entitled as Prince Trung Vũ (Trung Vũ đại vương).

== Legacy ==
Almost all historical accounts agree that it was no one else but Trần Thủ Độ who deserved credit for the birth of the Trần dynasty, Khâm định Việt sử Thông giám cương mục commented that perhaps it was for that reason that the temple name of the first emperor of the Trần dynasty was Thái Tông, which was often used for the second emperor of a dynasty, instead of Thái Tổ as usual.

Despite his lack of learning, Trần Thủ Độ was praised as a skilled and devoted official of the Trần dynasty, the ruling dynasty which was found by his very own effort. As a result, the grand chancellor held a position in the royal court which was so powerful that he was suspected by some of overruling the Emperor. Once, there was a person who went to the Emperor to report to him about this suspicion. Thái Tông immediately visited Trần Thủ Độ's residence with this person and made him repeat his accusations in front of the grand chancellor. After hearing the story, Trần Thủ Độ not only accepted that the man's suspicions were valid, but also awarded him for being concerned for the Trần dynasty. His successful governing was considered by historical books as the main factor that not only led to the stability of Early Trần period but also contributed to the victory of Đại Việt over the first Mongol invasion.

Trần Thủ Độ was also an honest mandarin who never profited his high position for the benefit of his family. It was said that one time the Emperor wanted to appointed Trần Thủ Độ's elder brother Trần An Quốc for the position of grand chancellor. Trần Thủ Độ politely declined the Emperor's request by answering: "An Quốc is my older brother. If you believe he is more skilled, then I will resign from my post. If you believe I am more skilled, then An Quốc cannot be appointed. If we both hold the position of Grand Chancellor, what will become of the royal court?". For his dedication, the Emperor personally redacted an epitaph for Trần Thủ Độ in his tomb. However, Trần Thủ Độ still remains as a controversial figure in History of Vietnam for his ruthless decisions against members of Lý royal family and his responsibility in the forced marriage between Trần Thái Tông and his brother Trần Liễu's wife, which was highly criticized by dynastic-era historians. Sometimes, his Machiavellian figure was compared with Dorgon, the powerful general who helped establish the Qing dynasty's rule in China, or Cardinal Mazarin who was chief minister of France for 20 years.

Today, the role of Trần Thủ Độ in the history of Vietnam remains a matter of debate between modern historians. For this reason, it was not until 2008 that a new street in Hanoi was named in honour of Trần Thủ Độ, a decision which is still met with some opposition from public opinion. Unlike his relatives Trần Hưng Đạo or Trần Quang Khải, the grand chancellor of the Trần dynasty is worshipped in only one place in Hanoi which is the Cầu Đông Pagoda. However, on the occasion of the millenary anniversary of Hanoi, the Feature Film Studio 1 decided to invest 2.66 million USD for a 30-episode television movie named Trần Thủ Độ which will focus on his life and the turbulent period of the Late Lý and Early Trần dynasty. In theatre, on the contrary, there were several plays which exploited the controversial role of Trần Thủ Độ in history such as Rừng trúc (Bamboo Forest) by the writer Nguyễn Huy Tưởng or Anh hùng và mỹ nhân (The Hero and the Beauty) by Chu Thơm. According to the stage director Lê Hùng, the life full of events of Trần Thủ Độ was a good source of inspiration in theatre because the play could focus on his inner feelings when Trần Thủ Độ had to act ruthlessly toward Lý clan for the benefit of his own Trần clan.

== Family ==
Trần Thủ Độ had one wife, Lady Linh Từ Trần Thị Dung, who was entitled as Mother of the Nation (Linh Từ quốc mẫu). She was daughter of Trần Lý, uncle of Trần Thủ Độ, and the former empress of the Emperor Lý Huệ Tông. She had an important role in the reconciliation between Trần Thái Tông and his brother Trần Liễu, Lady Linh Từ also had many activities to help the royal family during the Mongol invasion. Trần Thủ Độ's son Trần Duyệt and his grandson Trần Văn Lộng were both granted by the Emperor the title marquis as Marquis Nhân Thành (Nhân Thành hầu) and Marquis Chương Hoài (Chương Hoài thượng hầu) respectively, during the second Mongol invasion of Đại Việt, Trần Văn Lộng was one of the highest-ranking officials and royal members of Trần dynasty who defected to the Yuan side.
