= Lý Huệ Tông =

Lý Huệ Tông 李惠宗
- Emperor of Đại Việt

Emperor of the Lý dynasty
- Reign: 15/11/1210–3/9/1224
- Predecessor: Lý Cao Tông
- Successor: Lý Chiêu Hoàng

Retired Emperor of the Lý dynasty
- Reign: 1224–1226
- Predecessor: Sùng Hiền hầu
- Successor: Trần Thái Tổ (of Trần dynasty)
- Born: 10 July 1194; Thăng Long
- Died: 3 September 1226 (aged 31–32); Chân Giáo pagoda, Thăng Long
- Burial: Thọ Tomb
- Spouse: Trần Thị Dung
- Issue: Thuận Thiên (Trần dynasty empress); Princess Phật Kim as Lý Chiêu Hoàng
Names
- Lý Sảm (李旵) or Lý Hạo Sảm(李昊旵)
Era dates
- Kiến Gia (建嘉): 1210 – 10/1224
Regnal name
- Tự Thiên Thống Ngự Khâm Nhân Hoành Hiếu Hoàng đế (資天統御欽仁宏孝皇帝)
Temple name
- Huệ Tông (惠宗)
- House: Lý
- Father: Lý Cao Tông
- Mother: Empress An Toàn
- Religion: Buddhism

Lý Huệ Tông (chữ Hán: 李惠宗; born Lý Sảm 李旵; July 1194 – 3 September 1226) was the emperor of Vietnam from 1211 to 1224, the penultimate leader of the Lý dynasty. During Lý Huệ Tông's rule, many members of the Trần family assumed key roles in the government, including Trần Thủ Độ. The Trần family later used its position of power to place a young Trần Cảnh (temple name Trần Thái Tông) on the throne to found the Trần dynasty.

== Biography ==
In 1224, Lý Huệ Tông became mentally ill, and the issue of succession became pressing. He had produced no male heirs, and so appointed his seven-year-old daughter Lý Chiêu Hoàng as his successor. Although a female ruler would likely not have been normally acceptable to the court, Trần Thủ Độ had a scheme to end the Lý dynasty and place a Trần on the throne which depended on the existence of a young empress, and so Lý Chiêu Hoàng was accepted as empress. Lý Huệ Tông retired to become a Buddhist monk, although he lived only two more years. In 1226 Trần Thủ Độ, while consolidating the power of the newly founded Trần dynasty by eliminating Lý family members and potential pretenders, induced Lý Huệ Tông to commit suicide.
