= Trần Thái Tông =

Emperor of Đại Việt (r. 1226–58); first of the Trần dynasty

Trần Thái Tông 陳太宗

Emperor of Đại Việt
- Reign: 11 January 1226 – 30 January 1258
- Predecessor: Lý Chiêu Hoàng
- Successor: Trần Thánh Tông

Retired emperor of Trần dynasty
- Reign: 30 March 1258 – 5 May 1277
- Predecessor: Trần Thừa
- Successor: Trần Thánh Tông
- Born: 17 July 1218; Hương Tức Mặc, (present-day Nam Định)
- Died: 5 May 1277 (aged 58); Thăng Long
- Burial: 31 October 1277; Chiêu Lăng
- Spouse: Empress Chiêu Thánh (m. 1226–1237); Empress Thuận Thiên
- Issue: Trần Thánh Tông; Trần Ích Tắc
Names
- Trần Cảnh (陳煚)
Era name and dates
- Kiến Trung (建中): 1226–1232; Thiên Ứng Chính Bình (天應政平): 1232–1251; Nguyên Phong (元豐): 1251–1258
Regnal name
- Thống Thiên Ngự Cực Long Công Hậu Đức Hiền Công Hựu Thuận Thánh Văn Thần Vũ Hiếu Nguyên hoàng đế (統天御極隆功厚德顯功佑順聖文神武孝元皇帝)
Posthumous name
- Thống Thiên Ngự Cực Long Công Mậu Đức Hiển Hòa Hựu Thuận Thần Văn Thánh Vũ Nguyên Hiếu Hoàng đế 統天御極隆功茂德顯和佑順神文聖武元孝皇帝
Temple name
- Thái Tông (太宗)
- House: Trần
- Father: Trần Thừa
- Mother: Lady Lê

Trần Thái Tông (17 July 1218 – 5 May 1277), personal name Trần Cảnh or Trần Nhật Cảnh, temple name Thái Tông, was the first emperor of the Trần dynasty, reigning over Đại Việt for 33 years (1226–58), after which he lived as retired emperor for 19 years. He reigned during the first Mongol invasion of Vietnam before eventually abdicating in favor of his son Trần Hoảng (Trần Thánh Tông) in 1258.

He is also known for his Buddhist scholarship, which is still influential on Vietnamese Buddhism today, especially his Khóa Hư Lục (課虛錄, Instructions on Emptiness).

== Life ==
=== Early life ===
The ancestors of the Trần clan originated from the province of Fujian before they migrated under Trần Kính (陳京, Chén Jīng) to Đại Việt. According to a Chinese writer, Zhou Mi (1232–1298), Trần Nhật Cảnh's real name was Hsieh Sheng-ch'ing, "a man from Qinglo district in Fujian".

Trần Cảnh (陳 煚) was born in 1218 in modern-day Nam Định province during the last years of the Lý. Trần Thủ Độ, his uncle, prepared the way for his marriage to Empress Lý Chiêu Hoàng, the last empress of the House of Lý, who later abdicated to make him the founder of the Trần dynasty in 1226.

His progress to the throne in particular and the replacement of the Trần dynasty over the Lý dynasty in general were mostly thanks to the efforts of Trần Thủ Độ, Trần Cảnh's uncle. At that time, Trần Thủ Độ was the front commander of capital of the Lý house. Trần Cảnh's father, Trần Thừa, was also an official under the Lý dynasty, like Trần Thủ Độ. He had been "Nội thị phán thủ", one of the most important officials in the Lý dynasty.

=== Reign ===
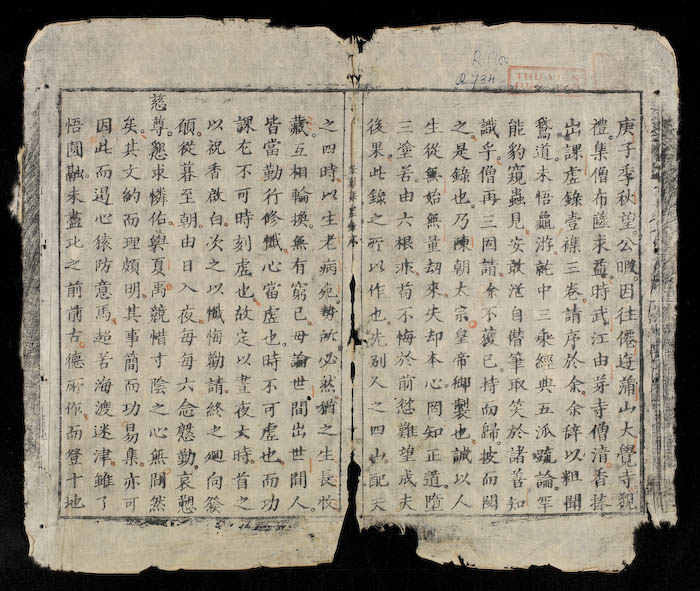
First page of a Buddhist essay in Chữ nho script of Trần Thái Tông, ca. 1260

During his reign Trần Thái Tông used three era names: Kiến Trung (1225–1232), Thiên Ứng Chính Bình (1232–1250) and Nguyên Phong (1251–1258).

In the autumn of 1257, Mongol general Uriyangkhadai addressed three letters to Trần Thái Tông demanding passage through to southern China in order to attack the Song dynasty. After the three successive envoys were imprisoned in the capital Thang Long (modern-day Hanoi) of Dai Viet, Uriyangkhadai invaded Dai Viet.

A battle was fought in which the Vietnamese used war elephants: the emperor even led his army from atop an elephant. Aju ordered his troops to fire arrows at the elephants' feet. The animals turned in panic and caused disorder in the Đại Việt army, which was routed. The Vietnamese senior leaders were able to escape on pre-prepared boats while part of their army was destroyed at No Nguyen (modern Viet Tri on the Hong River). The remainder of the royal army again suffered a major defeat in a fierce battle at the Phu Lo bridge the day after. This led the Tran leadership to evacuate the capital.

The Vietnamese annals report that the evacuation was "in an orderly manner;" however this is viewed as an embellishment because the Vietnamese must have retreated in disarray to leave their weapons behind in the capital. While Chinese source material incorrectly stated that Uriyangkhadai withdrew from Vietnam due to poor climate, Uriyangkhadai left Thang Long after nine days to invade the Song dynasty. After the Mongol departure, Trần Thái Tông agreed to send tribute every 3 years to the court of the Mongol Empire.

Learned in both Confucianism and Buddhism, Trần Thái Tông authored several profound works on Mahayana Buddhism, the most famous of which is Khóa Hư Lục (課虛錄, Instructions on Emptiness), a collection of sermons and essays on Buddhism. A prodigious writer, he left behind a substantial number of works, of which only a small number survive.

In 1258 Trần Thái Tông abdicated the throne in favor of his son, crown prince Trần Hoảng.

During his reign, a boy student was given money in exchange for becoming a eunuch by the emperor in 1254 since many men castrated themselves to become eunuchs during the Tran and Ly dynasties.

== Family ==
There is nothing that gives reference to exactly how many children he had, but it is known that he had children by the name of Trần Trịnh (died prematurely), Tĩnh Quốc Vương Trần Quốc Khang, Trần Hoảng, Chiêu Minh Vương Trần Quang Khải, Trần Nhật Vĩnh, Chiêu Quốc Vương Trần Ích Tắc, Chiêu Văn Vương Trần Nhật Duật, Chiêu Đạo Vương Trần Quang Xưởng, princesses Thiên Thành (wife of Hưng đạo Vương Trần Quốc Tuấn), Thiều Dương, Thuỵ Bảo, An Tư.

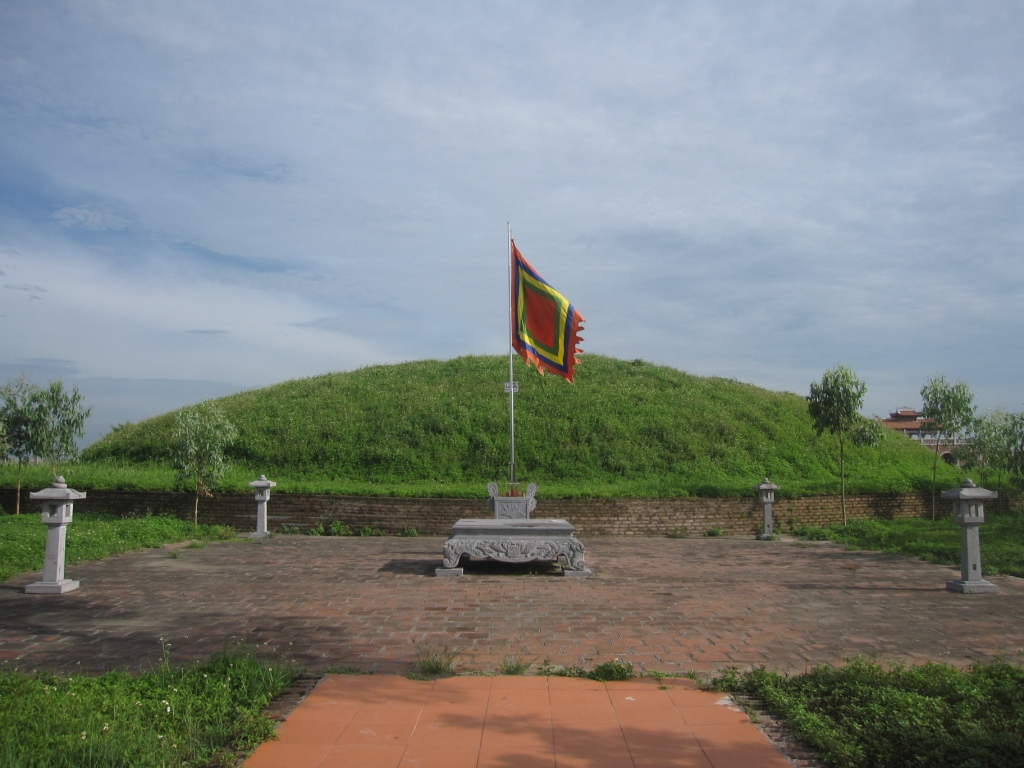
Tomb of Trần Thái Tông in Long Hưng, Thái Bình province

- Father: Trần Thái Tổ
- Mother: Lady Lê thị
- Brother(s) and sister(s):
1. Older brother: King of Yên Sinh
2. Older sister: Princess Thụy Bà, adoptive mother of Great King of Hưng Đạo
3. Younger brother: King of Khâm Thiên
4. Younger brother: King of Hoài Đức
- Consort(s) and their Issue(s):
1. Empress Consort Chiêu Thánh
  1. Crown Prince Trần Trịnh
2. Empress Consort Thuận Thiên
  1. Prince Trần Quốc Khang, later King of Tĩnh Quốc
  2. Crown Prince Trần Hoảng, later Emperor Trần Thánh Tông
  3. Prince Trần Quang Khải, later Great King of Chiêu Minh
- Other Issues:
1. Prince Trần Nhật Vĩnh, King of Bình Nguyên
2. Prince Trần Duy, King of Vũ Uy
3. Prince Trần Quang Xưởng, King of Chiêu Đạo
4. Prince Trần Ích Tắc, King of Chiêu Quốc
5. Prince Trần Nhật Duật, King of Chiêu Văn
6. Prince Trần Uất, King of Minh Hiến
7. Princess Thiên Thành, later Queen Nguyên Từ of Great King of Hưng Đạo
8. Princess Thiều Dương
9. Princess Thụy Bảo, later wife of General Trần Bình Trọng
10. Princess An Tư, later wife of Prince Toghan of Yuan dynasty. Prince Toghan was the ninth son of Kublai Khan.

== Relation with Trần Liễu ==
Trần Liễu was Trần Thái Tông's elder brother. In 1237, Trần Thái Tông and Empress Chiêu Thành still did not have any son to maintain the continuation of his dynasty, due to Trần Trịnh's premature death.

At that time, Princess Thuận Thiên, Trần Liễu's wife, had been pregnant with Quốc Khang for 3 months. Trần Thủ Độ and his wife princess Thiên Cực advised the emperor to arrogate the pregnancy to himself to maintain the continuity of the dynasty. Taking their advice, the emperor gave injunction to appoint princess Thuận Thiên the status of empress, and demote Chiêu Hoàng to princess. In response, Trần Liễu took his army to Cai River to rebel.

This incident embarrassed Trần Thái Tông and he left the capital for Yên Tử Mountain. Only after taking advice from the Buddhist priest Đạo Viên and Trần Thủ Độ, did he return to the capital. Two weeks later, Trần Liễu surrendered. Trần Thủ Độ intended to behead him, but Trần Thái Tông intervened by covering him with his body, so that Trần Thủ Độ could not do anything. Afterwards, he gave him his territory, consisting of Yên Phụ, Yên Dưỡng, Yên Sinh, Yên Hưng, and Yên Bang.

Due to the name of his territory, Liễu was also called "Yên Sinh Vương."

== Notes ==
Trần Thái Tông House of Trần Born: 1218 Died: 1277
Regnal titles
Preceded by Lý Chiêu Hoàng as Empress of Lý dynasty	Emperor of Trần dynasty 1226–1258	Succeeded by Trần Thánh Tông
Preceded by Trần Thừa	Retired Emperor of Trần dynasty 1258–1277	Succeeded by Trần Thánh Tông
