= Patriarchs' Hall =

Building in East Asian Buddhist temples

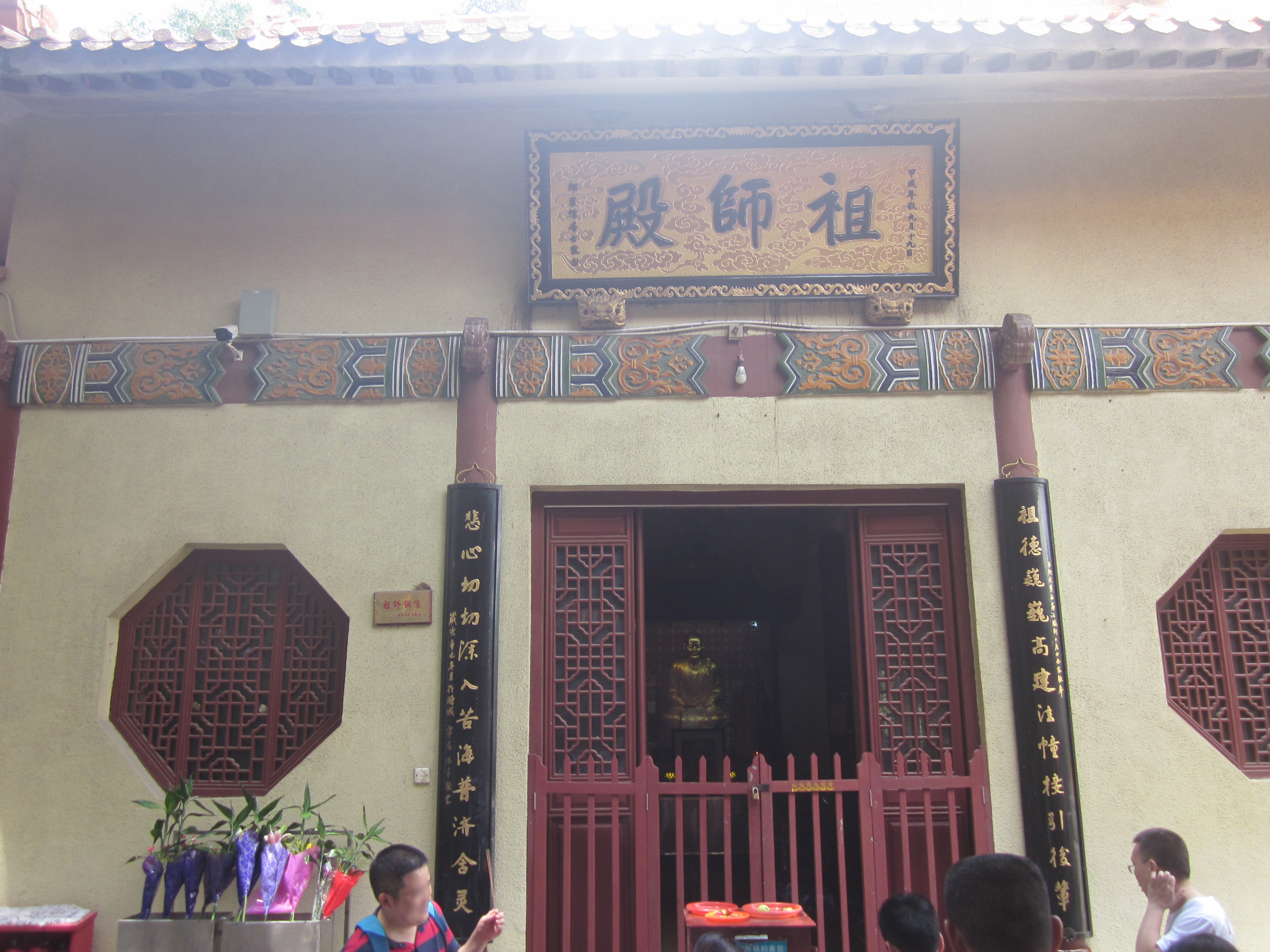
- The Hall of Founder at Hongfa Temple, in Shenzhen, Guangdong, China.

Chinese name
- Traditional Chinese: 祖師堂 or 祖師殿
- Simplified Chinese: 祖师堂 or 祖师殿
- Literal meaning: Hall of the Patriarchs
Transcriptions
Standard Mandarin
- Hanyu Pinyin: Zushi Táng/ Zǔshī Diàn

Alternative Chinese name
- Chinese: 祖堂
- Literal meaning: Ancestor Hall
Transcriptions
Standard Mandarin
- Hanyu Pinyin: Zu Táng

Second alternative Chinese name
- Chinese: 影堂
- Literal meaning: Shadow Hall
Transcriptions
Standard Mandarin
- Hanyu Pinyin: Yǐng Táng

Vietnamese name
- Vietnamese alphabet: Tổ Sư Đường or Tổ Đường
- Chữ Hán: 祖師堂 or 祖堂

Korean name
- Hangul: 조사당
- Hanja: 祖師堂
Transcriptions
- Revised Romanization: Josadang
- McCune–Reischauer: Chosadang

Japanese name
- Kanji: 祖師堂 or 御影堂
Transcriptions
- Romanization: Soshidō or Mieidō

The Patriarchs' Hall is a building in East Asian Buddhist temples enshrining the founding monk or a highly revered national master of the temple, a specific tradition, or of Buddhism in that country. Patriarchs' Hall serves as centers of commemoration, venerating the lineage and legacy of these masters, and are distinct from halls dedicated to celestial Buddhas or bodhisattvas. The architectural style, specific nomenclature, and the figures enshrined within these halls reflect the unique historical development and cultural integration of Buddhism in each country.

In Chinese Buddhist temples, they are usually termed the Zushi Tang or Zushi Dian. In Japanese Buddhist temples, they are usually termed the Soshidō or Mieidō. In Korean Buddhist temples, they are usually termed the Josadang. In Vietnamese Buddhist temples, they are usually termed the Tổ Sư Đường or Tổ Đường.

== China ==
In Chinese Buddhism, particularly within the Chan Buddhism tradition, the Patriarchs' Hall, also often called Zu Tang (祖堂; Zǔ Táng; 'Ancestor Hall') or Ying Tang (影堂; Yǐng Táng; 'Shadow Hall'), is a key building within a temple's architectural layout. It is dedicated to the founding monks of the specific lineage. The hall symbolizes the unbroken "mind-to-mind" transmission of the Dharma from master to disciple, a core principle of Chan Buddhism.

The establishment of Patriarchs' Hall is intrinsically linked to the sinicization of Buddhism and the rise of Chan Buddhism during the Tang dynasty (618–907). As various lineages formed, the need to honor their respective founders grew. These halls are typically located within the main temple compound, often to the side of the primary Buddha hall. Their architectural style follows the general principles of Chinese temple architecture, featuring wooden post-and-beam structures, curved roofs, and ornate decorations. The interior is often solemn and serene, focusing attention on the enshrined figures.

The Patriarchs' Hall is the most important annex halls in Chinese Buddhist temples for enshrining masters of various Buddhist schools. It is generally situated to the west of the Mahavira Hall. Three types of statues are typically always enshrined in the Patriarchs' Hall, namely the founder of the school, a senior monk or monks who made significant contributions to the establishment of the school and the founder of the temple or the lineage the temple belongs to.

The founders of the various traditions of Chinese Buddhism are typically enshrined as the central image in most Patriarchs' Halls. In many Chan Buddhist temples, the Patriarchs' Hall typically has Bodhidharma enshrined in the middle, the Sixth Patriarch Huineng's (638–713) statue on the left and Master Baizhang Huaihai's (720–814) statue on the right. Patriarch Bodhidharma, or Damo (達摩), from south of ancient India, was the original ancestor of Chan Buddhism. The Sixth Patriarch Master Dajian Huineng was another influential Patriarch of Chan Buddhism who is often enshrined in the Patriarchs' Hall as well. After him, the Chan Buddhism was almost changed and had far-reaching influence on Chinese traditional culture. Baizhang Huaihai was the third generation disciple of Huineng and his main achievements included: applying Chan Buddhism into practice, creating a set of regulations for Chan Buddhist temples and contributing to the steady development of Chan Buddhism. Other Patriarchs are commonly enshrined as well, such as Daman Hongren and Yongjia Xuanjue. In Chinese Pure Land temples, the Patriarchs' Hall typically enshrine one or more of the Chinese Pure Land Patriarchs. The list of patriarchs enshrined include Lushan Huiyuan, who was the First Patriarch of the Pure Land tradition and founder of the first White Lotus Society, Jixing Chewu, who was a prominent Qing dynasty (1644–1912) Pure Land Buddhist scholar, or Yinguang, who was the most recent Patriarch and widely regarded as an emanation of the Bodhisattva Mahāsthāmaprāpta. In Tiantai temples, the Patriarchs' Hall typically enshrines Zhiyi, who was the founder of the Tiantai tradition. Temples that were historically associated with eminent monastics usually also enshrine them in their respective Patriarchs' Halls, such as Faxian and Xuanzang.

== Japan ==
In Japan, halls dedicated to founders of the various Buddhist traditions are called Soshidō (祖師堂) or Mieidō (御影堂, "Honorable Image Hall"). Veneration of the founder is particularly strong, making the Patriarchs' Hall a central focus of worship. Many of these halls are historically and architecturally significant, often designated as National Treasures or Important Cultural Properties. Patriarchs' Halls became prominent with the development of powerful temple complexes in the Kamakura and Muromachi periods. They are often located in a historically significant part of the temple grounds, sometimes near the founder's mausoleum. Architecturally, they can vary from simple, austere structures reflecting Zen ideals to more elaborate buildings, but they generally maintain a dignified atmosphere befitting their memorial function. Shingon temples typically venerate Kōbō Daishi and Kōgyō Daishi, Tendai temples venerate Saichō, Nichiren temples venerate Nichiren Shōnin, Jōdo-shū temples venerate Hōnen and Jōdō Shinshū temples venerate Shinran and Ōbaku Zen temples venerate Ingen. These statues are typically made of wood and exude a solemn presence. Ikegami Honmon-ji: This Nichiren tradition temple in Tokyo houses a Patriarchs' Hall that contains a statue of Nichiren. This statue, along with the temple's five-storied pagoda, is recognized as one of Japan's most important cultural assets, designated as a National Treasure. Taiseki-ji: The head temple of Nichiren Shōshū in Shizuoka Prefecture. Its Patriarchs' Hall enshrines a life-sized wooden statue of Nichiren Daishōnin.

== Korea ==
In Korea, the Patriarchs' Hall is a hall that enshrines high monks who founded temples or established traditions. It forms an integral part of Korean Buddhism, found in temples of the Hwaeom and Jogye orders. The architectural style is that of traditional Korean wooden construction, characterized by a calm, harmonious design that blends with nature. The statues enshrined depend on the temple's tradition and history. They often include figures like Uisang Daesa, the founder of the Korean Hwaeom school, or Jinul Daesa, a key patriarch of the Jogye Order. Buseoksa, located in Yeongju, the temple was founded in 676 by Uisang Daesa. The Patriarchs' Hall at Buseoksa was rebuilt in 1377 during the Goryeo dynasty and is one of the oldest surviving wooden buildings in Korea, preserving valuable murals. Jogyesa, the head temple of the Jogye Order in Seoul, within its grounds is a Patriarchs' Hall dedicated to the patriarchs of the order.

== Vietnam ==
In Vietnam, the Founder's Hall is known as Tổ Đường (祖堂) or Tổ Sư Đường (祖師堂). It venerates the founders of temples or patriarchs of Vietnamese Buddhist traditions, such as the Trúc Lâm school (竹林, "Bamboo Grove"). Architecturally, it often follows the traditional Vietnamese "工"-character layout, adorned with intricate carvings of dragons and phoenixes. The Founder's Hall enshrines statues of figures central to Vietnamese Buddhism, such as Emperor Trần Nhân Tông, the founder of the Trúc Lâm school, and his disciples Pháp Loa and Huyền Quang. These statues reflect the distinct history and culture of Vietnam.
