= Huyền Quang =

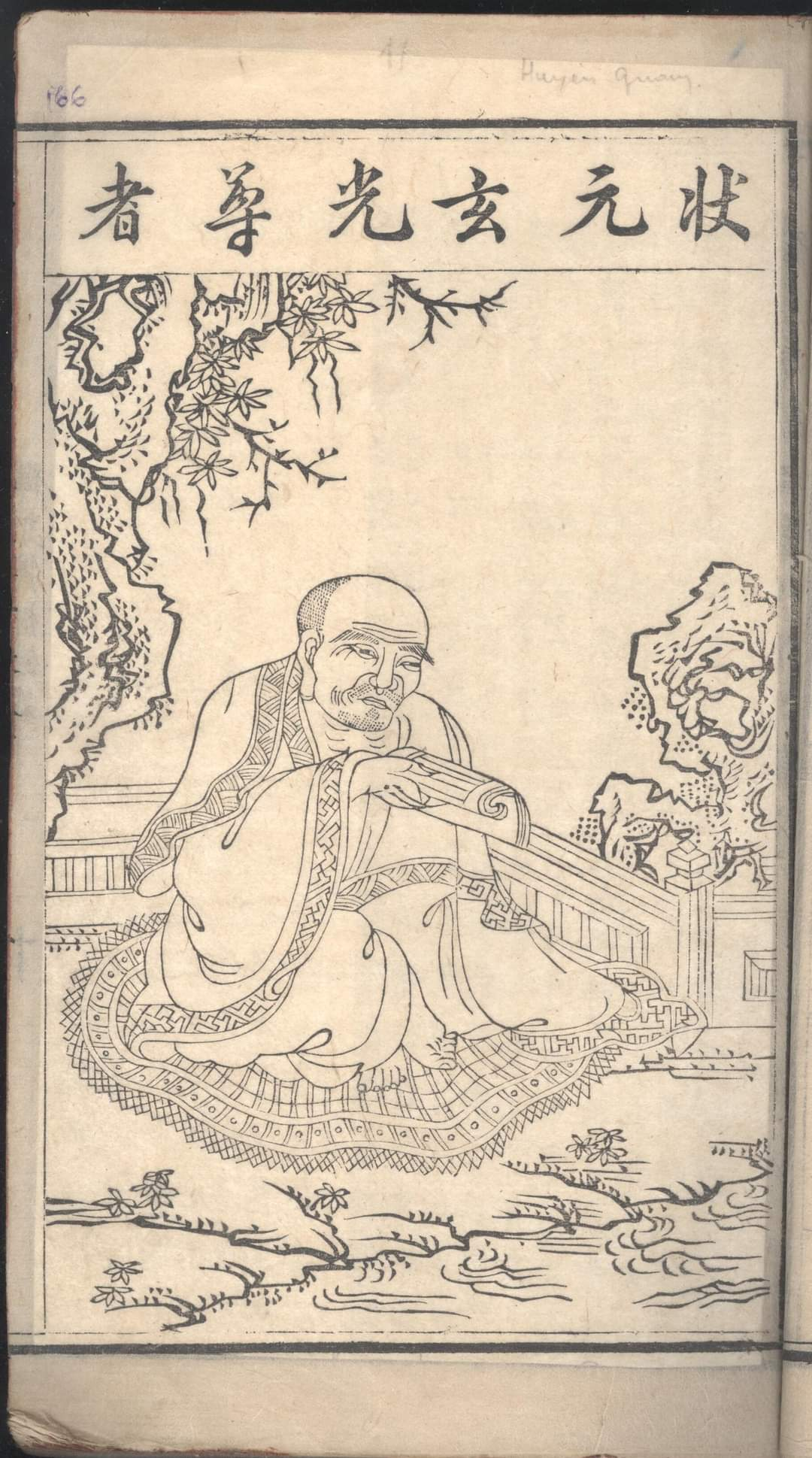
The portrait of patriarch Huyền Quang in the book Thiền uyển tập anh

Huyền Quang (玄光), 1254–1334, real name Lý Đạo Tái (李道載), was the third patriarch of the Trúc Lâm school of Vietnamese Thiền Buddhism.

He is also known for his poetry.

He was born in Van-Tai village in Bac-Giang, Vietnam. He passed the Trạng nguyên exam at the king’s court at the age of 20 and was appointed governor of the National Academy, as well as becoming ambassador to China. He later decided to leave diplomacy and enter the Sangha to study Buddhism with Pháp Loa.

Pháp Loa later compiled the Chu Phẩm Kinh (Various Essential Segments of the Scripture); this was revised and published by Huyền Quang.

== Lineage ==
Quang studied with Loa under Trần Nhân Tông, the first patriarch. Lao went on to become the second patriarch, and Quang succeeded him in 1331. He led the sangha for three years and was succeeded by An Tâm.

== Summary ==
He was born in Vạn Tải village, Nam Sách District, Lạng Giang. Now it is Vạn Tải village, Thái Bảo commune, Gia Bình district, Bắc Ninh province. He was very knowledgeable, passed both Hương examination and Hội examination. He passed the Trạng nguyên exam in 1272 or 1274 and was appointed to work in the Imperial House Institute of the court. After the resignation, he followed Trần Nhân Tông to Trúc Lâm. As a Vietnamese Thiền Buddhist monk, the third Trúc Lâm Yên Tử. He was a great poet with many preserved poems. Along with Trần Nhân Tông and Pháp Loa, he is considered a great Thiền Buddhist master of Vietnam and it is considered as both of them as equal to the Six patriarchs of Chan Buddhism or the preceding 28 Indian patriarchs.

== Gallery ==
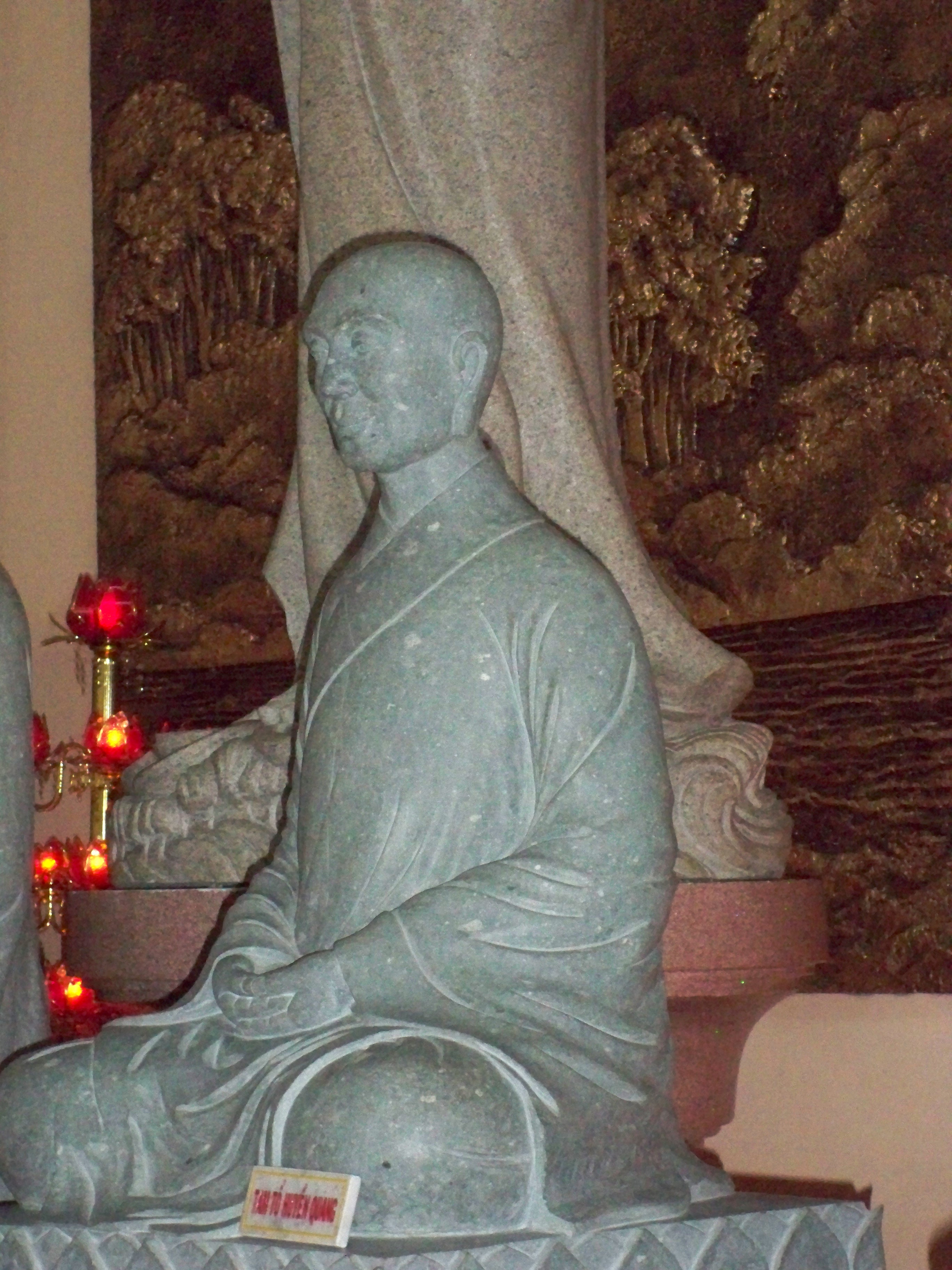
Huyền Quang statue in Trúc Lâm Temple

== See also ==
- Buddhism in Vietnam
- Thiền
- Trúc Lâm Monastery of Da Lat
