= Pháp Loa =

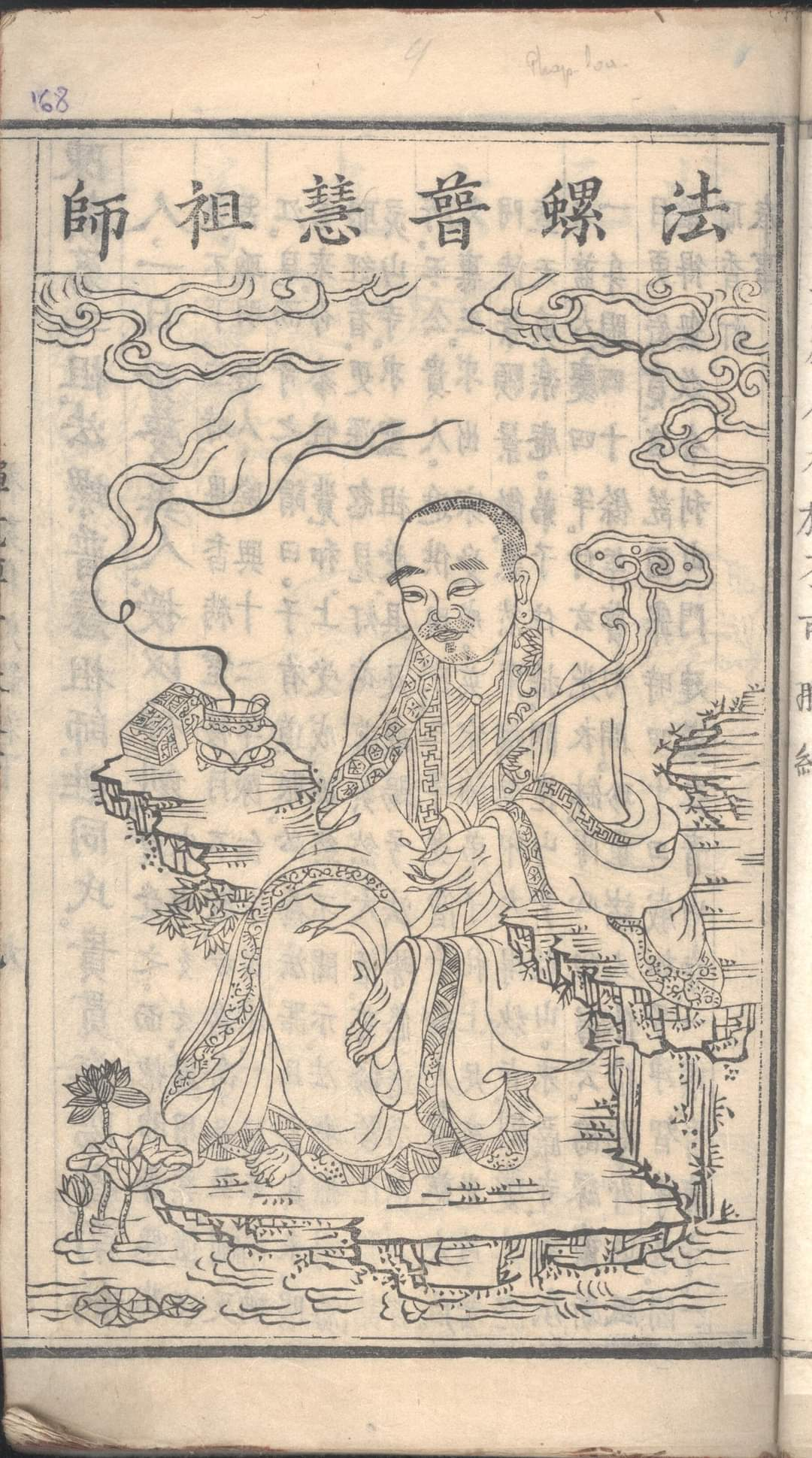
The portrait of patriarch Pháp Loa in the book Thiền uyển tập anh

Pháp Loa (法螺; 1284–1330) was a Vietnamese Thiền Buddhist monk of the Trúc Lâm Yên Tử sect, and second patriarch of that sect. He was a disciple of Buddhist emperor Trần Nhân Tông (1258–1308).

A recently discovered inscription at Thanh Mai Temple gives biographical details similar to the Tam tổ thực lục.

Pháp Loa compiled the Chu Phẩm Kinh (Various Essential Segments of the Scripture); this was revised and published by his successor Huyền Quang.

== Gallery ==
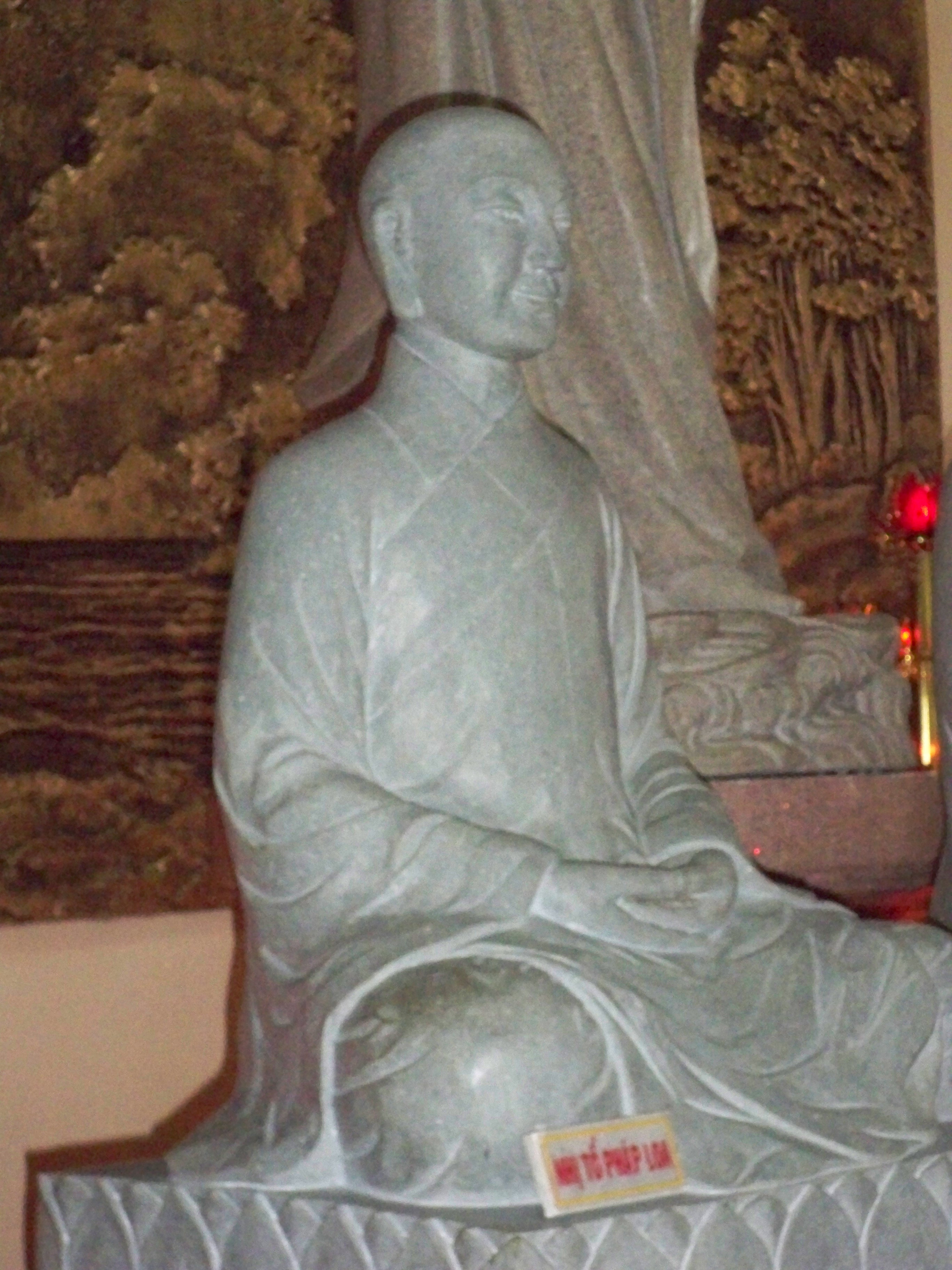
Pháp Loa statue in Trúc Lâm Temple

== See also ==
- Buddhism in Vietnam
- Thiền
- Trúc Lâm Monastery of Da Lat
