= Trúc Lâm Monastery of Da Lat =

Buddhist temple in Vietnam

- Thiền viện Trúc Lâm Đà Lạt
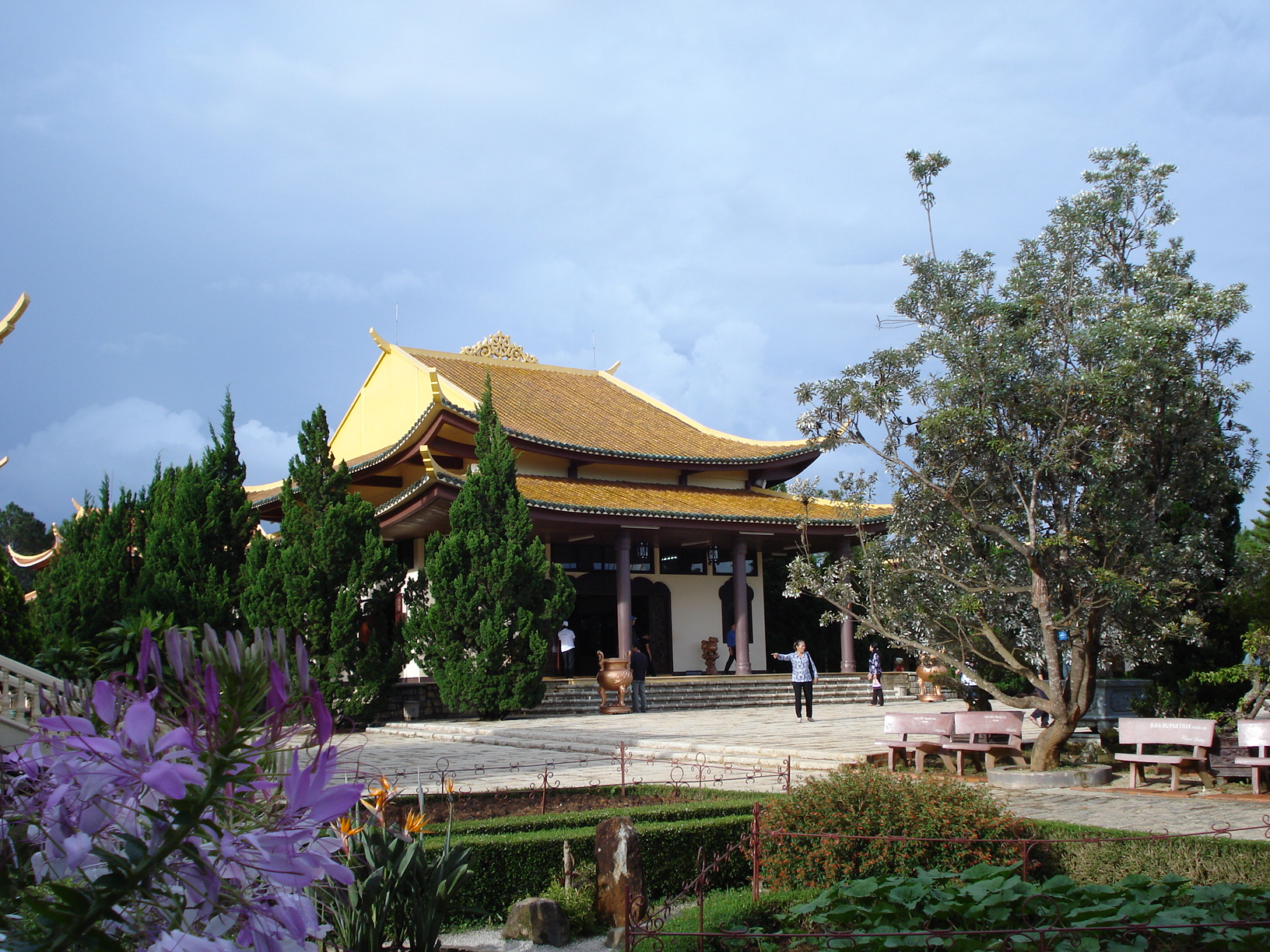

Religion
- Affiliation: Buddhism
- Sect: Trúc Lâm

Location
- Location: Da Lat, Lâm Đồng province
- Country: Vietnam
- Interactive map of Trúc Lâm Monastery of Da Lat
- Coordinates: 11.902459°N 108.436432°E

Architecture
- Completed: 1994

Trúc Lâm Monastery of Da Lat (Vietnamese: Thiền Viện Trúc Lâm Đà Lạt) is a Trúc Lâm Thiền Buddhist temple outside the resort town of Đà Lạt, in Vietnam.

== Temple ==
The temple is located outside the centre of Da Lat. From the district of Hòa Bình in the city centre of Da Lat, the temple is located at a turnoff on the road from the city centre towards Prenn Hill, the temple is near the Tuyền Lăm Lake, located on Phượng Hoàng Hill.

Along the road winding up the hill to the temple, the bell tower is clearly visible from afar. The tiled roof of the pagoda is also prominent, contrasting against the pine forests that surround it. The entrance of the temple is somewhat isolated, so there is a direct entrance to the temple with 61 steps or climbing, or the person can go directly past Tuyền Lâm Lake and then climb 222 steps past the triple gated entrance to enter the main courtyard in front of the temple.

The temple is located on a plot of land encompassing 24 hectares. Of the 24 hectares, there are two hectares that are occupied by buildings, divided into two areas, the domestic areas and public areas. The domestic area is closed to the public. There are two domestic quarters, for monks and nuns respectively. Each of the domestic quarters has two meeting rooms for sangha, a meditation hall, a kitchen, dining room and a shed. Currently, there are approximately 50 monks and 50 nuns in religious practice at the temple.

The public quarters is in a spacious plateau area on the grounds of the temple, at approximately 1300 m above sea level, overlooking Benhuit mountain and the wide expanse of Tuyền Lâm Lake. The public quarters was a building works undertaken under the architectural design of Ngô Viết Thụ and Nguyễn Tín, and was opened on March 13, 1994. The public quarters consistes of a ceremonial hall, flanked by the bell tower on the right and guest facilities on the left. At the front of the guest facilities lies a rose garden, and at the front slopes of the temple in front of the gate is an artificial lake with a capacity of 15,000 cubic metres.

The statue in the main ceremonial hall is of Gautama Buddha seated on a lotus, flanked on either side by Văn Thù Sư Lợi and Phổ Hiền bodhisattvas, respectively known for their wisdom and dedication. An adjacent hall is used on the 14th and 29th of each lunar month, that is, the eve of the full moon and the new moon, the abbot holds a discussion session on meditation with meditation students, including lay Buddhists.

One of the objectives of the temple is to recreate the spirit of Zen Buddhism during the Trần Dynasty that ruled Vietnam from 1225 to 1400. The tradition practiced here was started by Emperor Trần Nhân Tông, who abdicated the throne in favour of his son Trần Anh Tông to become a Buddhist monk and founded a new tradition in Zen. He had incorporated the three sects of Zen that had come to Vietnam from China, the Tỳ-ni-đa-lưu-chi, Vô Ngôn Thông and Thảo Đường into a new Vietnamese Zen tradition, known as Trúc Lâm. This came after he had led royal troops in defeating Nguyên Mông before retreating to Yên Tử mountain to begin his religious life before travelling around the country to expound the dharma.

The Trúc Lâm Zen tradition emphasizes the habit of applying Buddhist practice in whatever surroundings one finds oneself in, for sangha and laypeople alike.

== Gallery ==
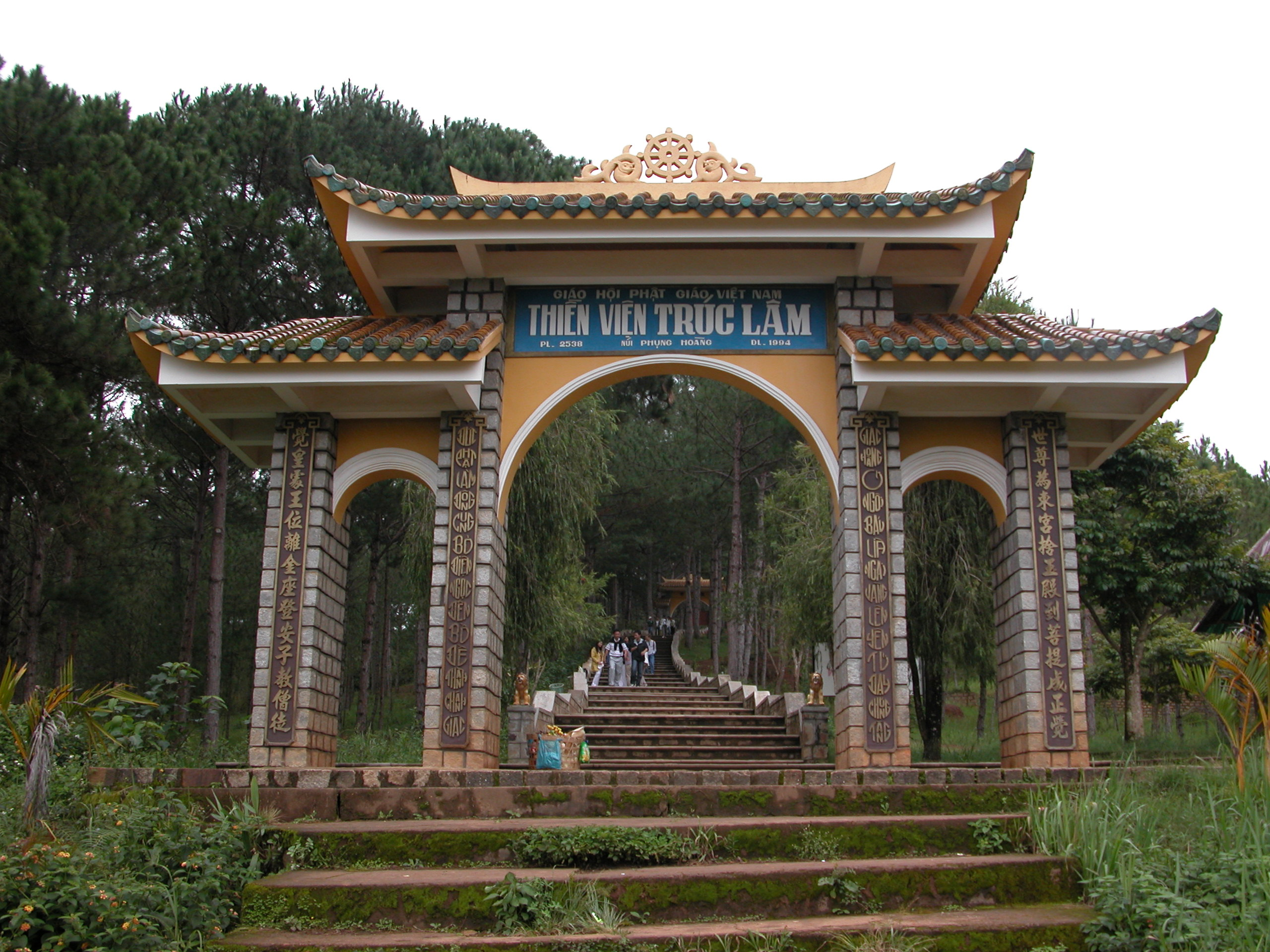
Gate to the monastery

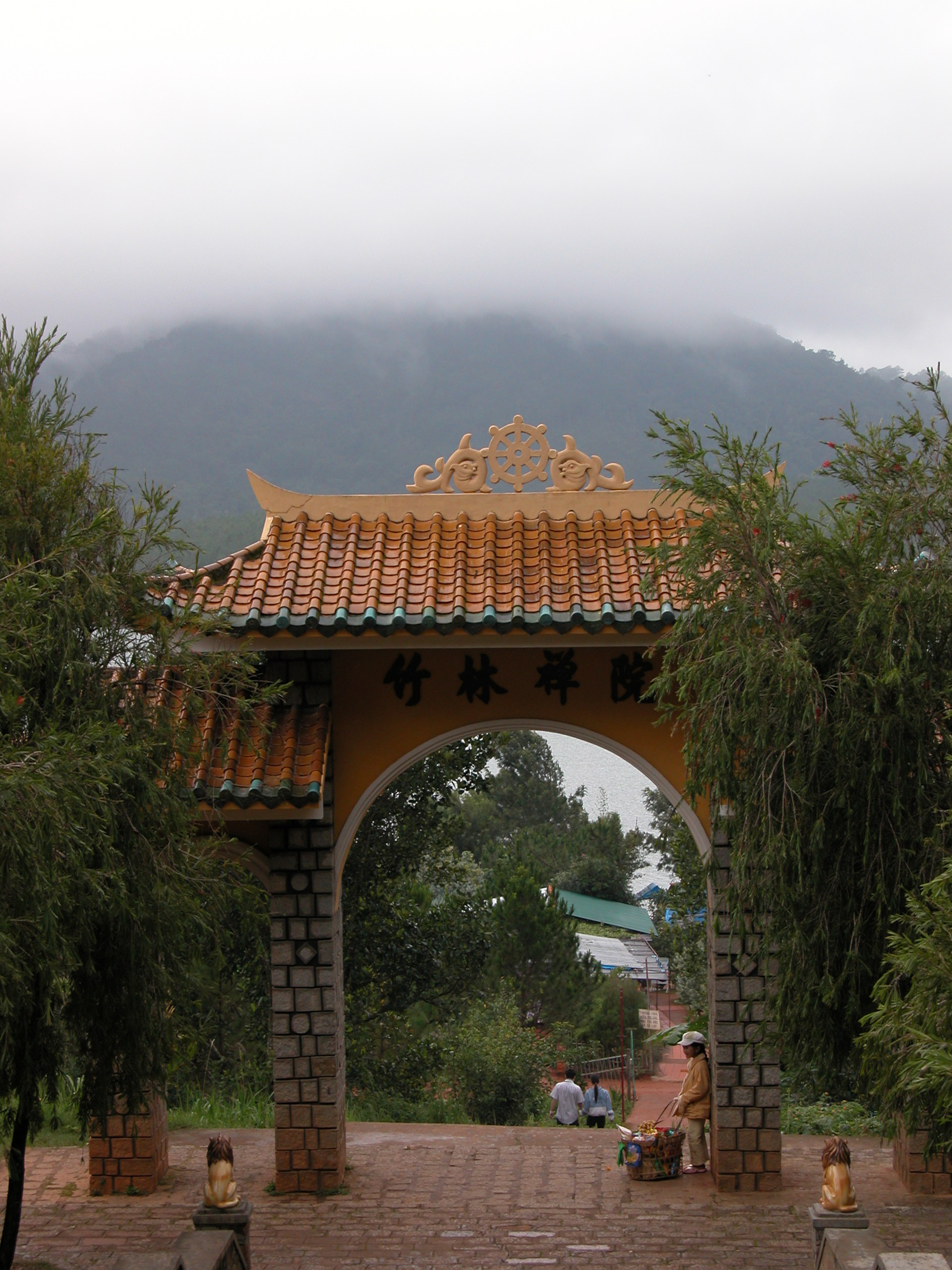
From the gate overlooking Tuyền Lâm lake

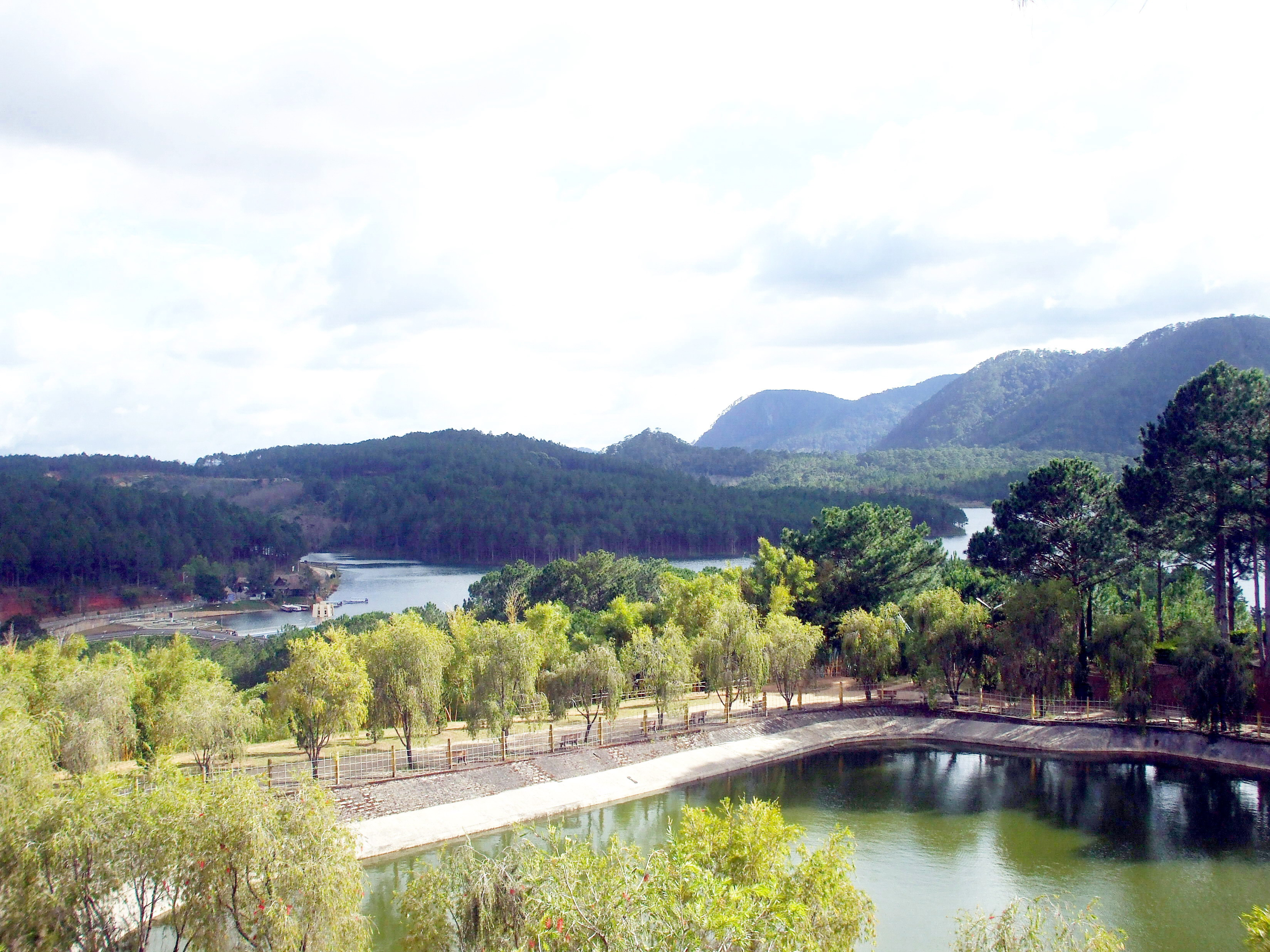
Landscape in front of the monastery

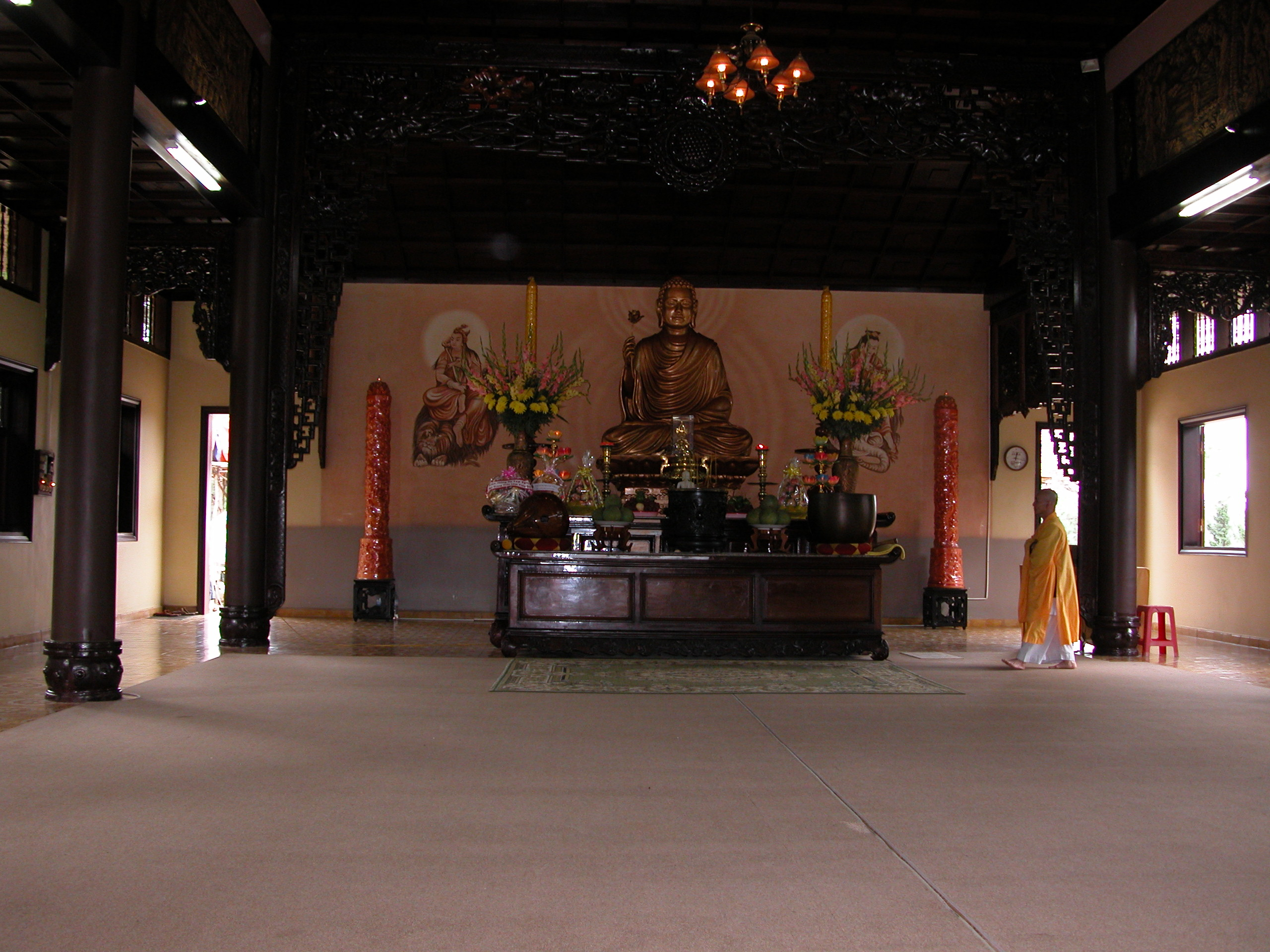
Main hall

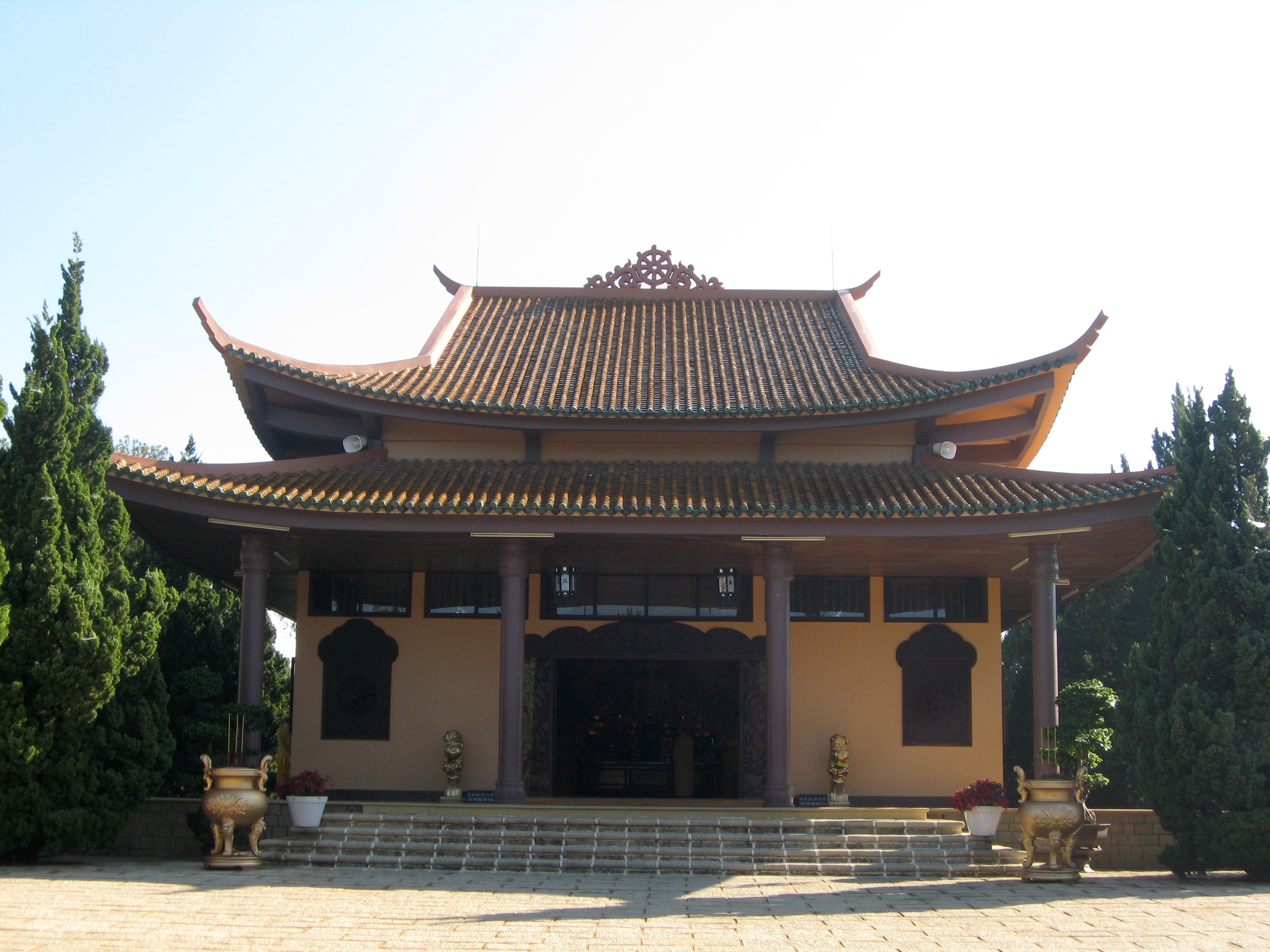
Main hall

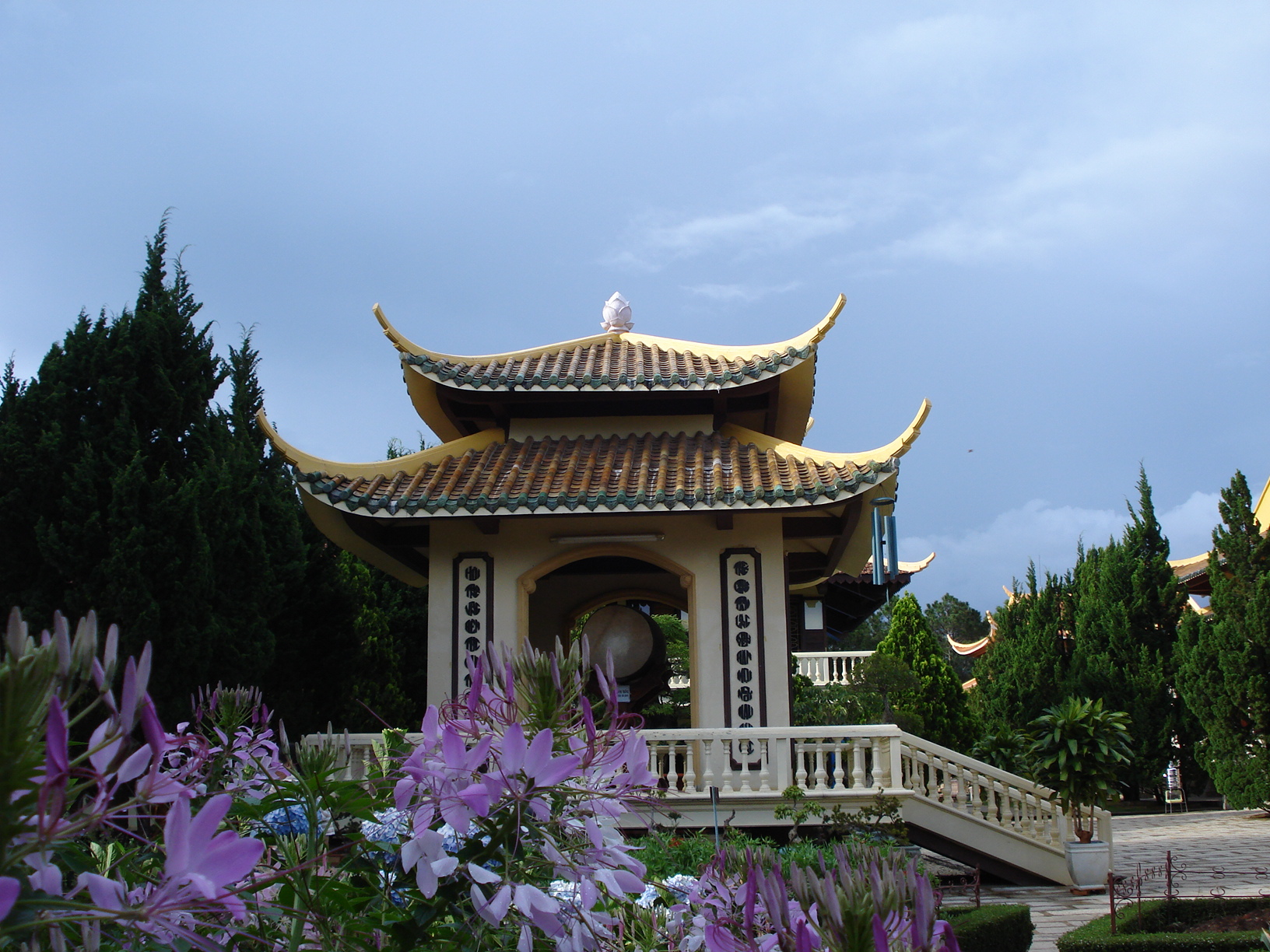
Empty attic

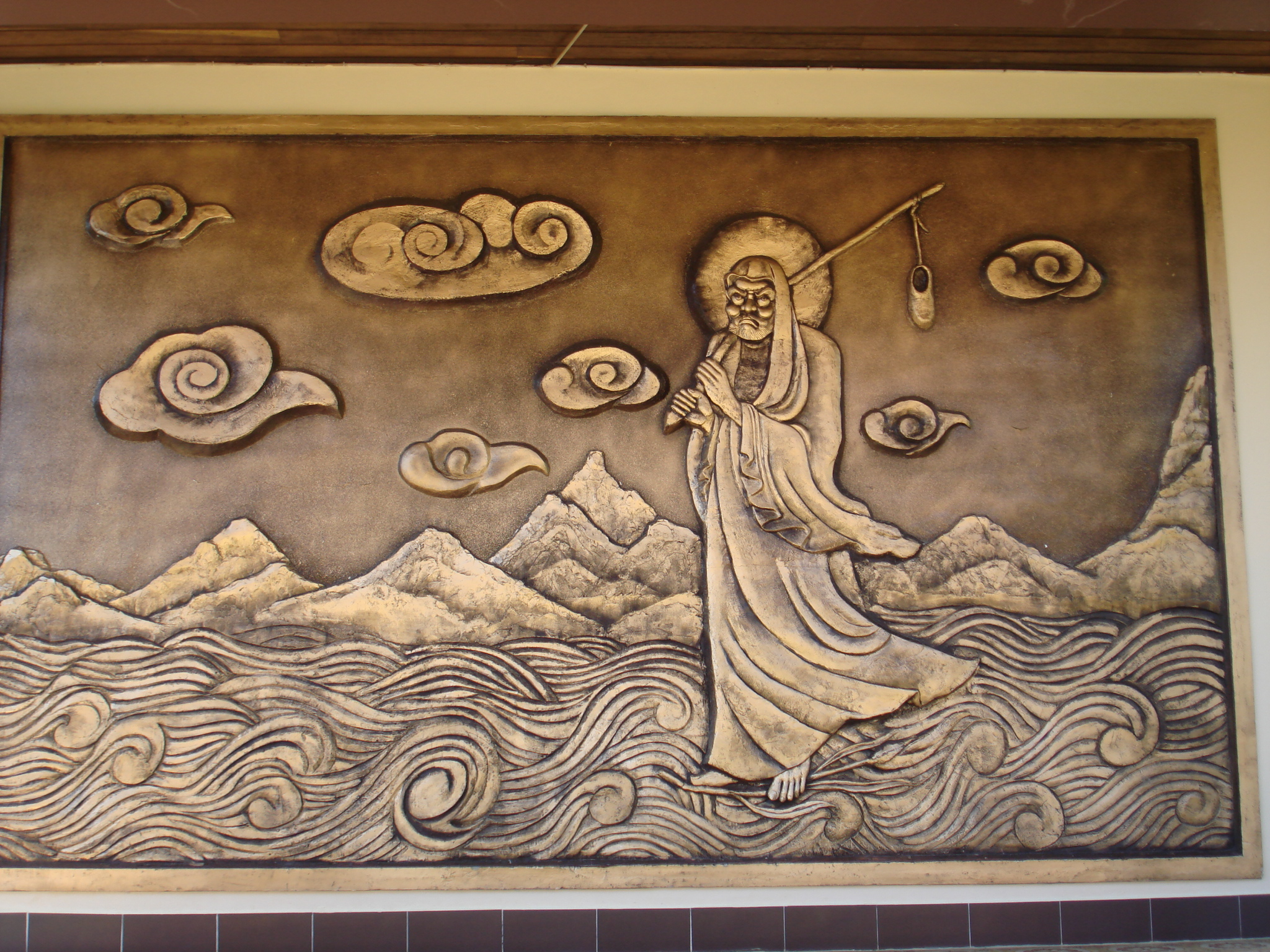
Bodhidharma statue behind the monastery

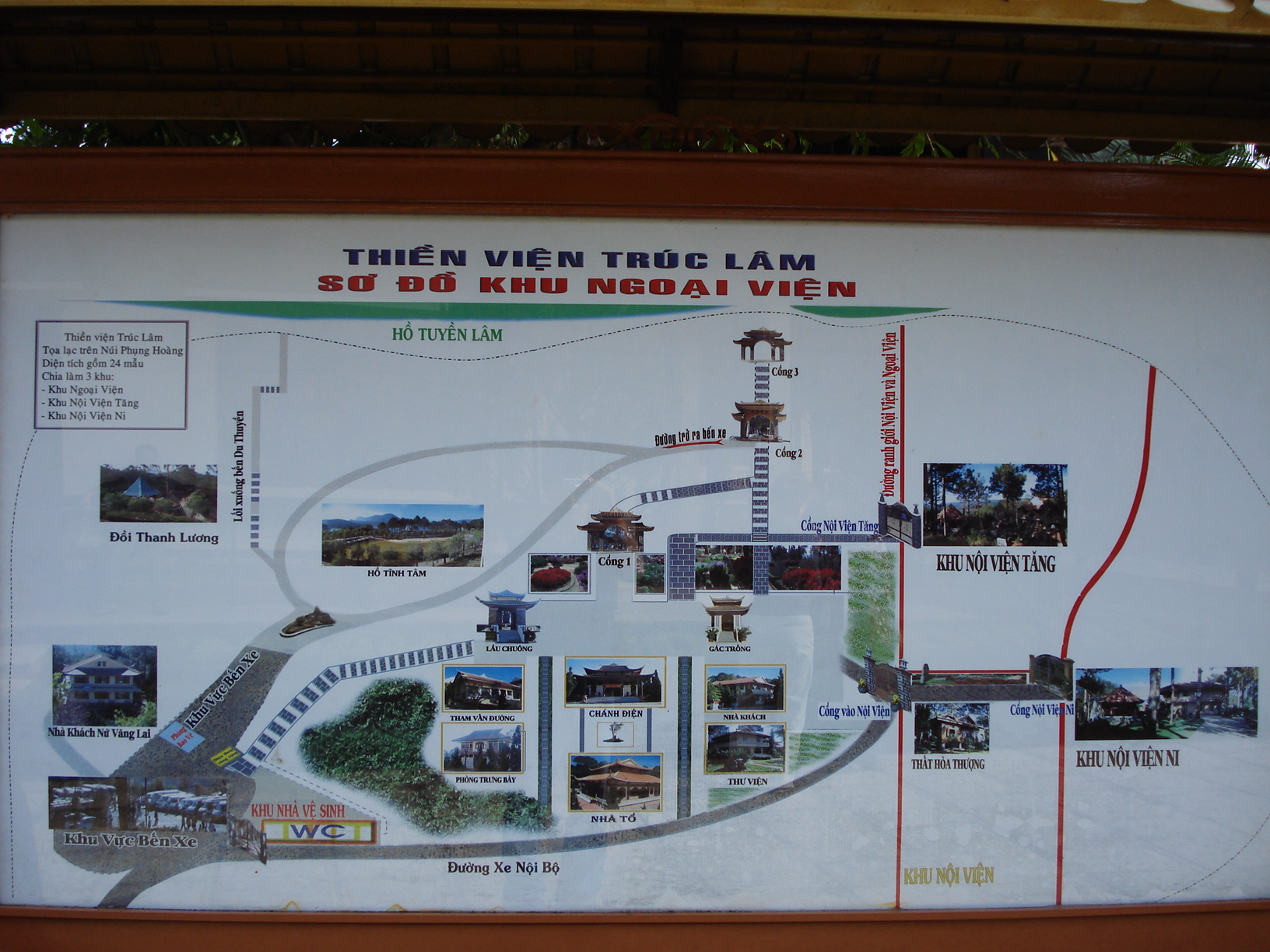
Map to visit the Zen Monastery

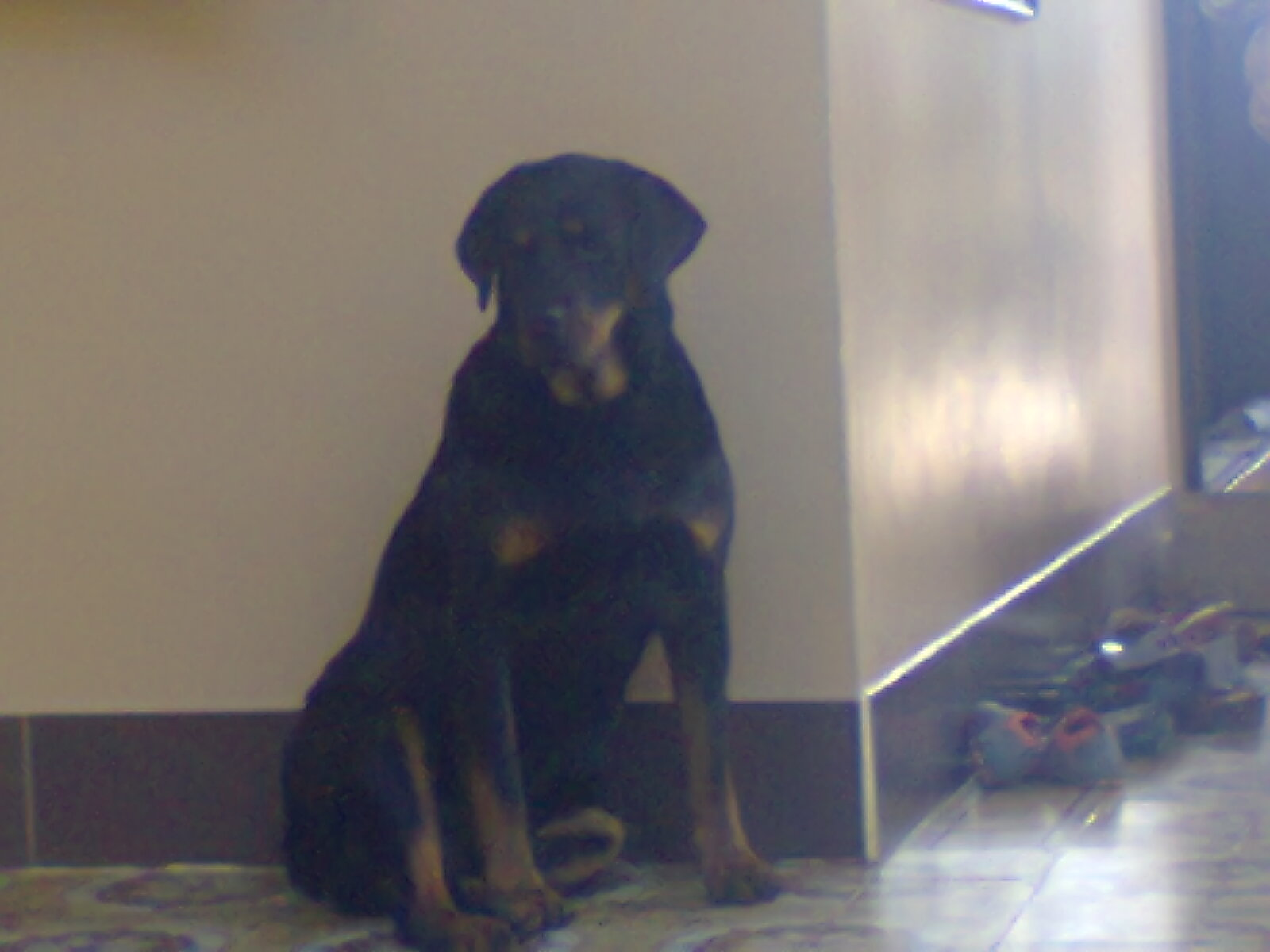
A Rottweiler dog

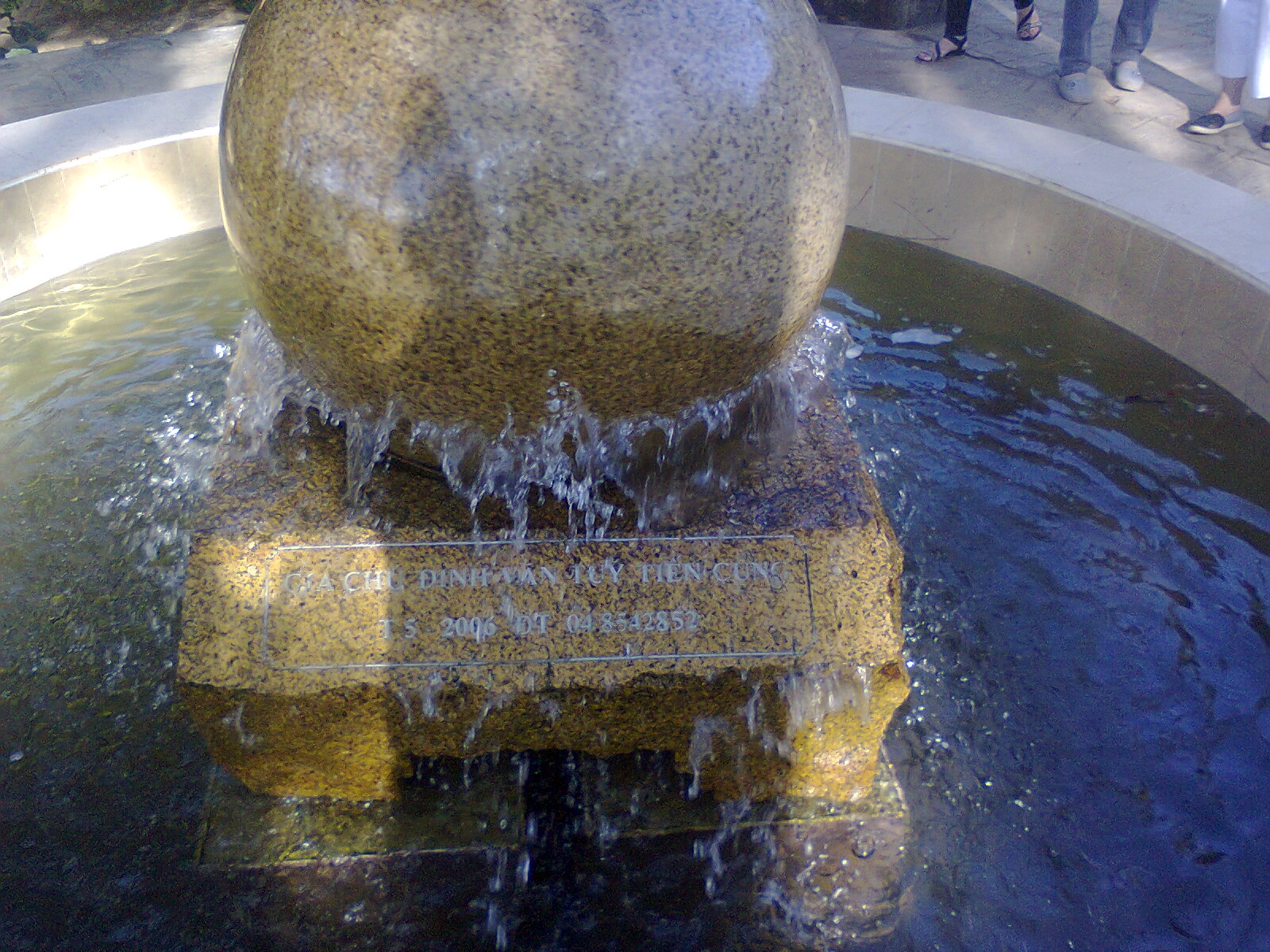
A rotating ball in the grounds

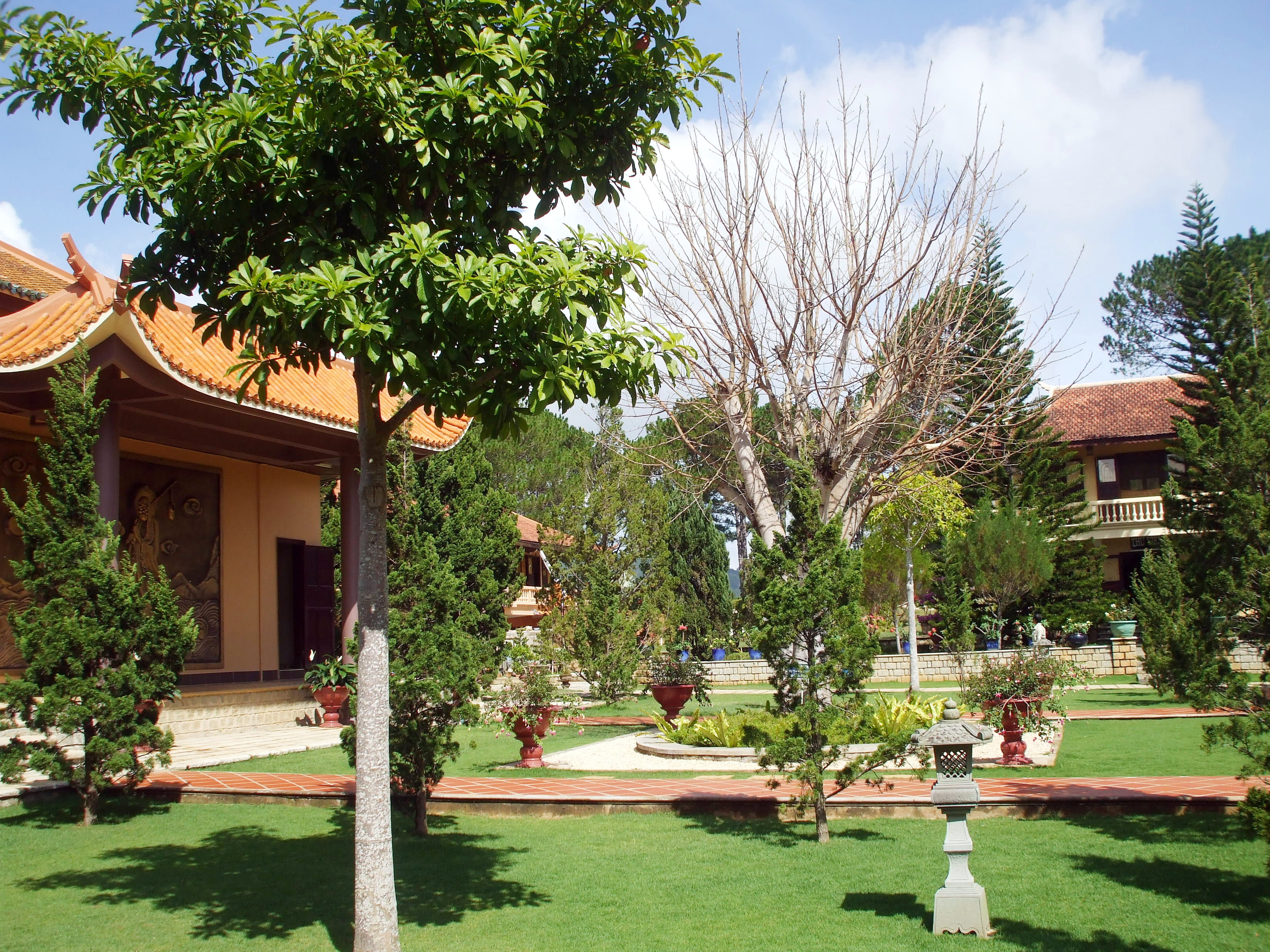
The area behind the main hall

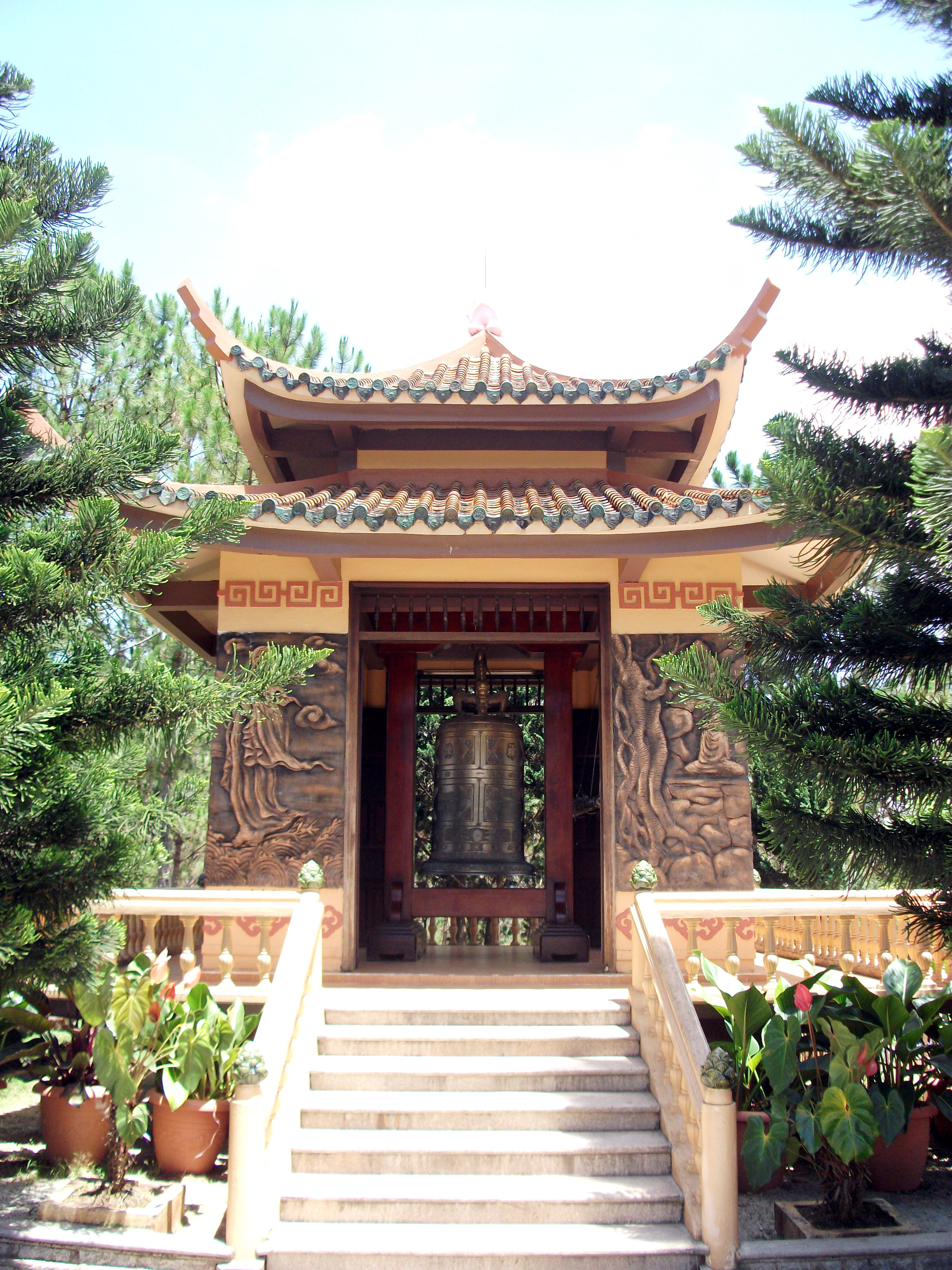
Steeple

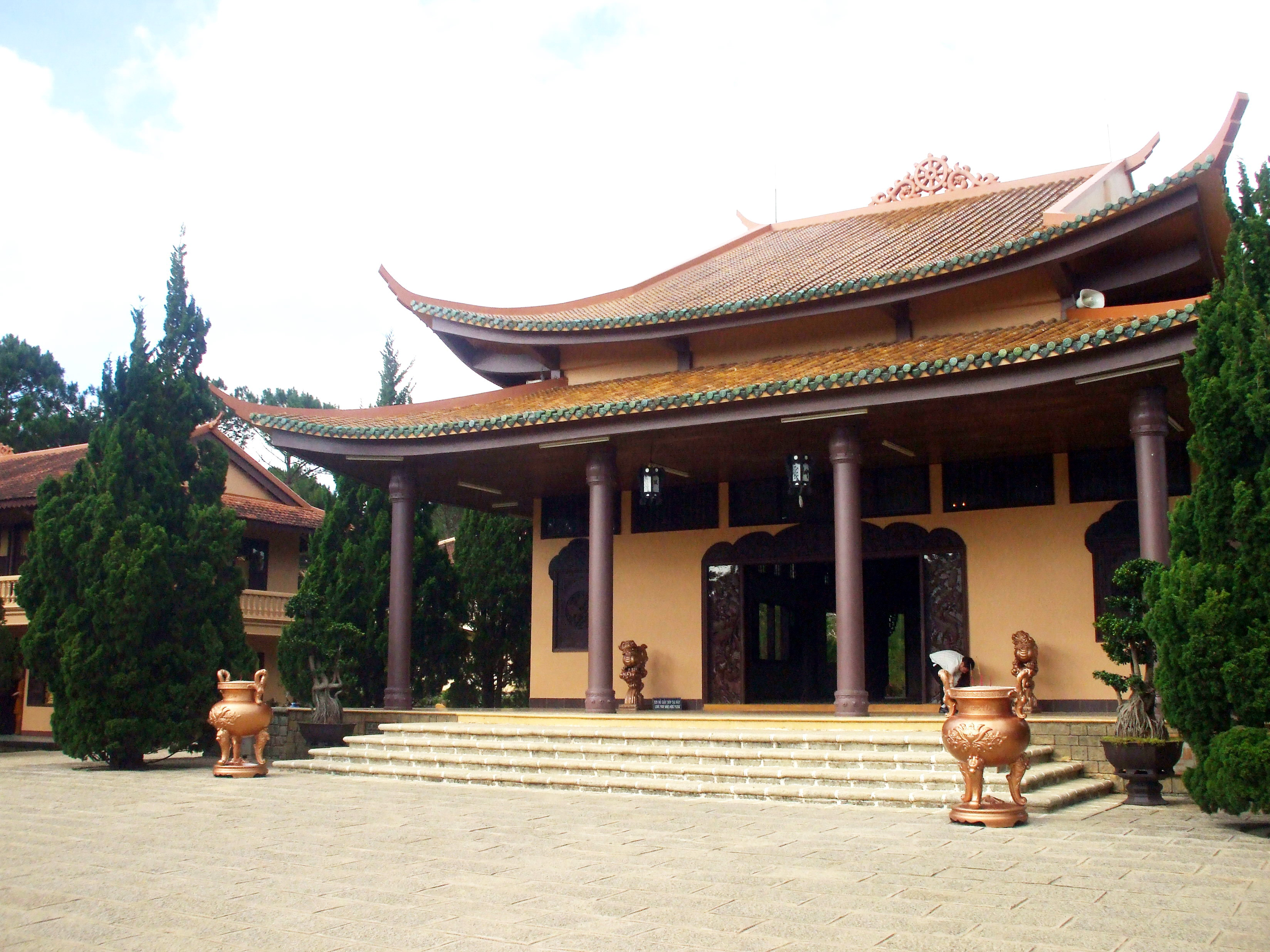
Main hall
