= Thiền =

Vietnamese version of Chan Buddhism

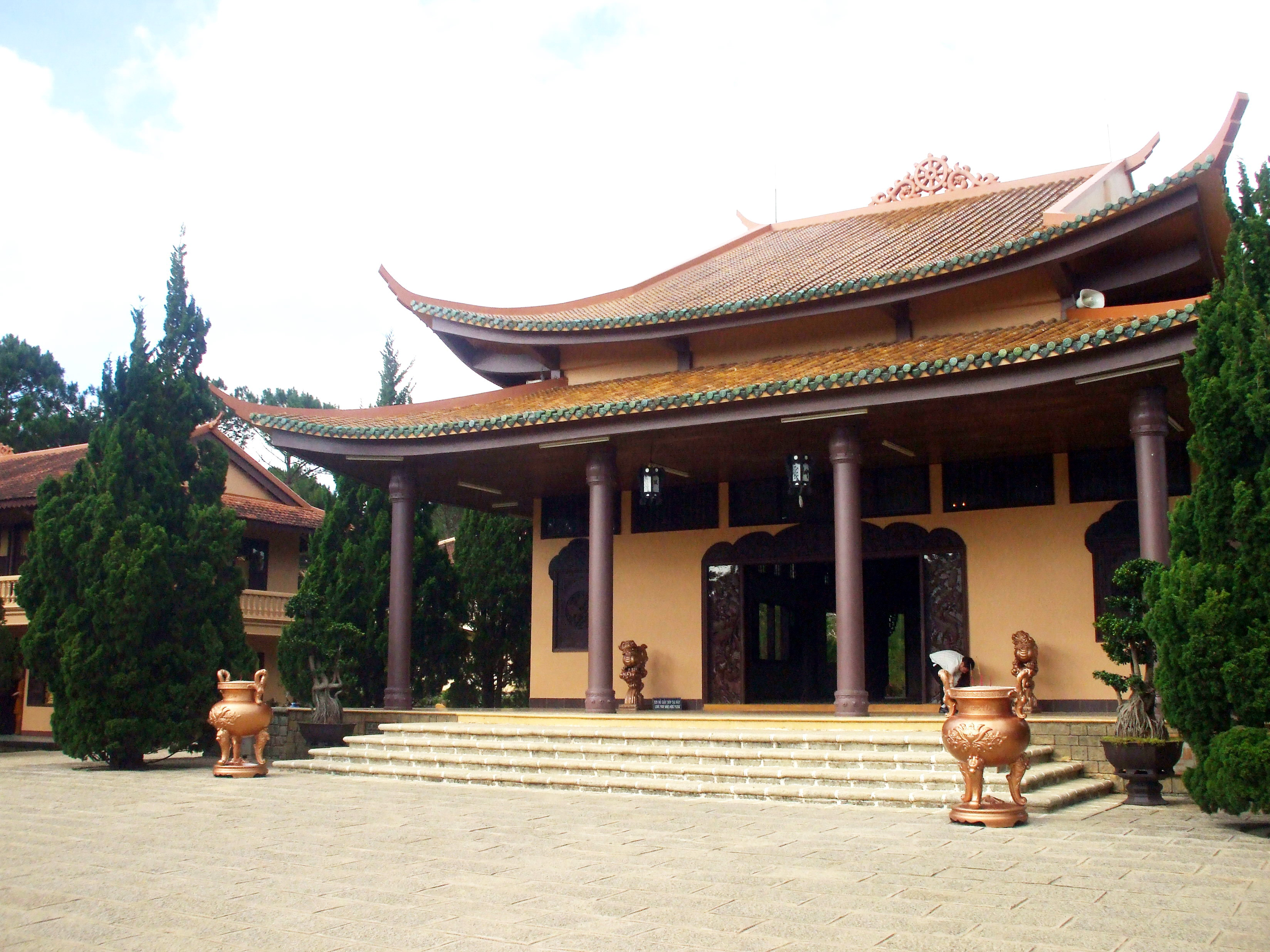
Trúc Lâm Temple, Thiền temple outside the resort town of Đà Lạt, Vietnam.

Thiền Buddhism (Vietnamese: Thiền tông, 禪宗, IPA: [tʰîən təwŋm]) is the name for the Vietnamese school of Zen Buddhism. Thiền is the Sino-Vietnamese pronunciation of the Middle Chinese word 禪 (chán), an abbreviation of 禪那 (chánnà; thiền na), which is a transliteration of the Sanskrit word dhyāna ("meditation").

== History ==
=== Early period ===
Chinese Chan Buddhism was introduced during the early Chinese domination of Vietnam, 111 BCE to 939 CE, which also accommodated local animism and Cham influences. According to traditional accounts, in 580, an Indian monk named Vinītaruci (Vietnamese: Tì-ni-đa-lưu-chi) who is considered the founder of Thiền, traveled to Vietnam after completing his studies with Sengcan, the third Patriarch of Chan. However, Chan was already present in the country before his arrival. "Thiền Buddhism was already established in Vietnam before Vinītaruci's arrival, for Phap Hien studied under and was ... After Vinītaruci's death, Phap Hien built the Temple of Chung-thien at Mount Tu, about twenty miles northwest of Luy Lâu."

The sect that Vinītaruci and his lone Vietnamese disciple founded would become known as the oldest branch of Thiền. After a period of obscurity, the Vinītaruci School (Diệt Hỉ Thiền phái; 滅喜禪派) became one of the most influential Buddhist groups in Vietnam by the 10th century, particularly so under the patriarch Vạn Hạnh (who died 1018). Other Thiền schools were founded during this time, such as the Pháp Vân Temple lineage. Other early Vietnamese Thiền schools included that of the Chinese monk Wu Yantong, called Vô Ngôn Thông in Vietnamese, which was associated with the teaching of Mazu Daoyi. Information about these schools can be gleaned from a Chinese language hagiographical work entitled Thiền uyển tập anh ("Compendium of Outstanding figures of the Chan Garden" c. 1337).

A careful study of the primary sources by Cuong Tu Nguyen however concludes that the legend of Vinītaruci and the accounts of Vô Ngôn Thông are probably fabrications, a version of Vietnamese Buddhist history that "was self-consciously constructed with the composition of the Thiền uyển in medieval Vietnam."

Cuong Tu Nguyen notes that the kind of Buddhism which was practiced in Vietnam during the Chinese occupation period and before the writing of the Thiền uyển was "a mixture of thaumaturgy, asceticism, and ritualism" which was "very worldly engaged."

=== Vietnamese dynasties ===
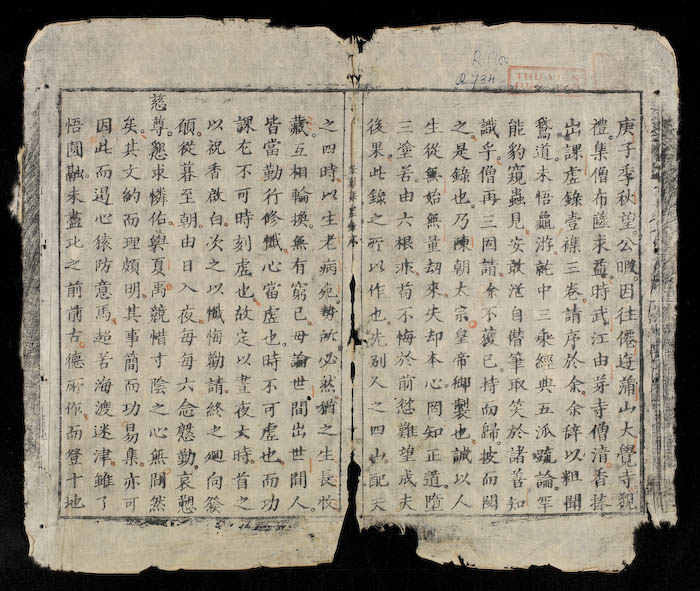
First page of a Buddhist essay by Trần Thái Tông, ca. 1260. Chữ Nho script.

Buddhist culture, literature, arts and architecture thrived during the period of peace and stability of the four Vietnamese dynasties of the Early Lê, Lý, Trần and the Later Lê (980-1400).

During the early Lê and Lý periods, Buddhism became an influential force in court politics and the dynastic elites saw Buddhist clergy as useful assistants in their political agenda which they provided in return for patronage. They were eventually integrated into the structure of the imperial state.

During the Lý and Trần dynasties, a "new" court Buddhism arose among the elites which was aligned with Chinese Chan and influenced by Chan literature. Some of the Trần rulers were quite involved in the development of Thiền Buddhism. Trần Thái Tông (1218–77) was known as the "Great Monk King" and wrote various important Buddhist works including Instructions on Emptiness (Khóa Hư Lục), A Guide to Zen Buddhism and a Commentary on The Diamond Sutra, as well as poetry.

The first truly Vietnamese Thiền school was founded by the religious emperor Trần Nhân Tông (1258–1308), who became a monk. This was the Trúc Lâm or "Bamboo Grove" school, which evinced a deep influence from Confucian and Taoist philosophy. It seems to have been an elite religion for aristocrats and was also promoted by Chinese monks who traveled to Vietnam to teach. Nevertheless, Trúc Lâm's prestige waned over the following centuries after the Ming conquest (1413-1428) which led to a period of Confucian dominance.

In the 17th century, a group of Chinese monks led by Nguyên Thiều established a vigorous new school, the Lâm Tế, based on the Linji school, which mixed Chan and Pure Land Buddhism. A more domesticated offshoot of Lâm Tế, the Liễu Quán, was founded in the 18th century by a monk by the name of Liễu Quán. Lâm Tế remains the largest monastic order in the country today.

Beside the Linji school, the Caodong school was first introduced to Northern Vietnam through Thiền master Thông Giác Thủy Nguyệt (通覺水月, 1637-1704), who traveled to China and practiced under Chan master Yiju Zhijiao (一句智教, 30th generation of Caodong school) in Huzhou region, Zhejiang province, China. After three years of practice there, he achieved enlightenment and received inka from Master Zhijiao. He then returned to Vietnam and began to preach Buddhism.

Thông Giác Thủy Nguyệt's successor was Thiền master Chân Dung Tông Diễn (真融宗演, 1640–1711), who became famous for his piety and critical role in resolving the Buddhist problem during the Lê Trung Hưng dynasty. Similar to Chan Buddhism in the Ming and Qing dynasties, this lineage also focuses on both Zen and Pure Land practice, of which Zen practice is the major thread. The first supreme patriarch of the Vietnam Buddhist Sangha, Venerable Thích Đức Nhuận (1897-1993), was a disciple of the school. The main temple is the Hòe Nhai pagoda (also called Hồng Phúc tự), located in Ba Đình district, Hanoi.

=== Modern period ===
Vietnamese Buddhism suffered from political oppression during the colonial era of French Indochina, both by pro-Confucian mandarins and French colonial policies.

Modern Vietnamese Thiền was influenced by the Buddhist modernism of figures like Taixu and D. T. Suzuki, who saw Buddhism in terms of social and personal transformation, rather than in supernatural terms. During the 1930s, a Buddhist reform movement led by intellectual clergy of "engaged Buddhism" focused on non-violent social and political activities such as peacemaking, promotion of human rights, environmental protection, rural development, combatting ethnic violence, opposition to warfare, and support of women's rights. The modernization movement also protested against popular devotion, arguing that Buddhism should be "purified from superstition". In 1963, in response to a hostile government, Vietnamese Mahayana and Theravada Buddhists formed the Unified Buddhist Sangha. Thích Trí Quang led South Vietnamese Buddhists in acts of civil resistance in protest of the South Vietnamese government's repression of Buddhists during the "Buddhist crisis" of '63.

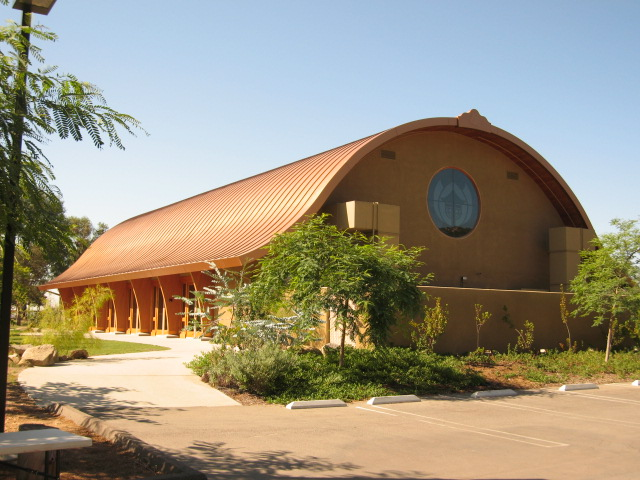
Deer Park Monastery (California) meditation hall, which is part of Thích Nhất Hạnh's Plum Village Tradition

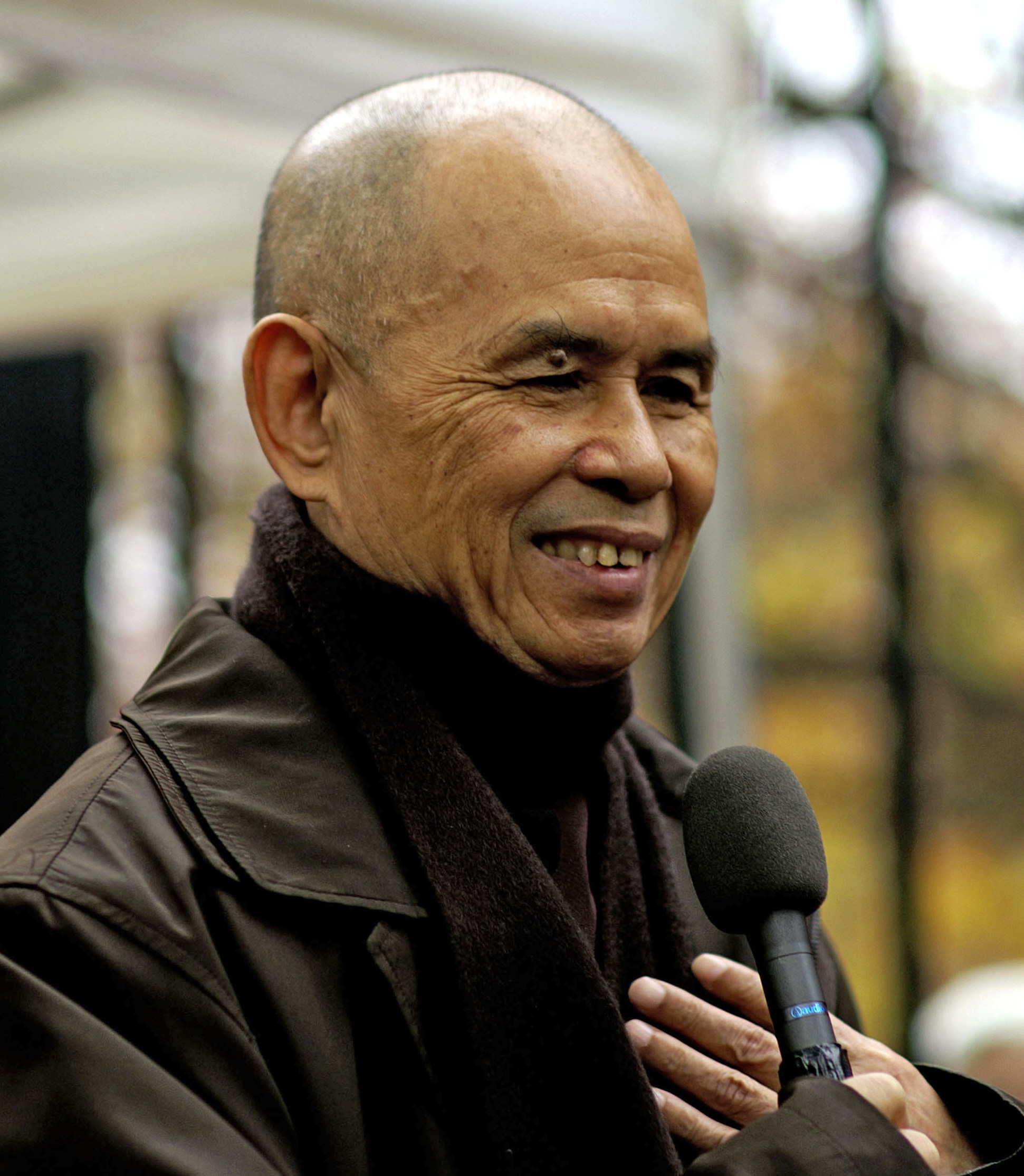
Thích Nhất Hạnh, Vietnamese Thiền master

Thiền master Thích Thanh Từ (1924–2022) is credited for renovating Trúc Lâm in Vietnam. He was one of the most prominent and influential Thiền masters of the 20th and early 21st century. He was a disciple of Master Thích Thiện Hoa. The most famous practitioner of modern Thiền Buddhism in the West was Thích Nhất Hạnh (1926–2022) who authored dozens of books and founded the Plum Village Monastery in France together with his colleague, Thiền Master bhikkhuni Chân Không.

Other influential Vietnamese teachers in the West include Thích Thiên-Ân, who taught philosophy at University of California, Los Angeles and founded a meditation center in L.A, and Thích Thiện Tâm author of several books in English such as Buddhism of Wisdom & Faith: Pure Land Principles and Practice.

In recent years, the modernization of Thiền has taken a new global dimension, as Vietnamese Zen is becoming influenced by the teachings of influential overseas Vietnamese Buddhist leaders such as Thích Nhất Hạnh who have adopted Thiền to Western needs, focusing on mindfulness. As a result, Vietnamese Buddhists have also now begun to practice these modernized forms of Thiền.

This modernist form of Thiền has become quite popular at home and abroad, in spite of the fact that there is still no complete freedom of religion in contemporary Vietnam. Commenting on the current situation in Vietnam, Philip Taylor writes:

The flow of Buddhist practitioners, texts and ideas throughout Vietnam and across national boundaries sets the context for another recent development in Buddhism in Vietnam, the increasing prominence given in northern Vietnam to Zen (Thiền) as the quintessential Vietnamese Buddhist tradition....Southern Vietnam's intense transnational connections have enabled the repatriation and the circulation to elsewhere in Vietnam of the markedly meditative form of Buddhism developed by Vietnamese emigre monks based in the United States and France...Ironically, this recently imported purified form of Buddhism has come to be taken as a national tradition, a view which receives endorsement from the state, motivated, as are many lay Buddhists, to attach itself to an authentic national tradition that is not sullied by the taint of superstition....Today, the Communist Party seeks to boost its legitimacy by endorsing Zen a version of Buddhism promoted by a transnational movement, as an authentic national tradition.

== Teaching and practice ==
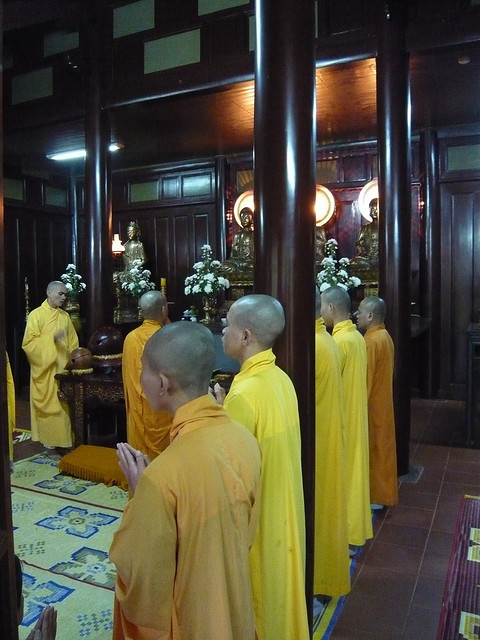
Thiền monks performing a service in Huế.

Thiền draws its texts and practices mainly from the Chinese Chan tradition as well as other schools of Chinese Buddhism. According to Thích Thiên-Ân:

Most Buddhist monks and laymen in Vietnam traditionally obey the disciplines of Hinayana, recite mantra, learn mudra, practice meditation, and chant the Buddha's name (V. niệm Phật, Ch. Nien-fo, J. Nembutsu) without any conflict between the practices. We may say, in short, that Buddhism in Vietnam is synthetic and unified rather than divided and sectarian. At present the popular method of practice is meditation during recitation and recitation during meditation - meditation and recitation being one and the same for Vietnamese Buddhists.

This practice is known as the "union of Zen and Pure-Land recitation". The chanting of sutras, such as the Lotus sutra, the Vimalakirti, Surangama Samadhi and Mahaparinirvana sutra is also a very widespread practice, as in all schools of Zen.

Due to the presence of Theravada Buddhism in Vietnam, Thiên has also been influenced by Theravada practices. The intra-religious dialogue between Vietnamese Theravada and Mahayana following the formation of the Unified Buddhist Church also led to a more inclusive attitude in the Vietnamese Buddhist community. An example is the widely influential figure of Thích Nhất Hạnh, who, as John Chapman notes, though being part of the Lam Te school, also included Theravada as part of his studies. Thích Nhất Hạnh also wrote commentaries on the Theravada Satipatthana sutta and the Anapanasati sutta. According to Chapman, Hạnh sought to "promote the idea of a humanistic, unified Buddhism." He founded the Order of Interbeing as a new modernist and humanistic form of Vietnamese Zen.

McHale also notes that Vietnamese Buddhist practice has always been inclusive and accepting of popular beliefs and practices, including folk religion, Taoism, and Confucianism.

== See also ==
- Buddhism in Vietnam
- Lý Thái Tông
- Trần Nhân Tông
