= Thiền uyển tập anh =

Vietnamese Buddhist biographical text

Thiền uyển tập anh (禪苑集英)
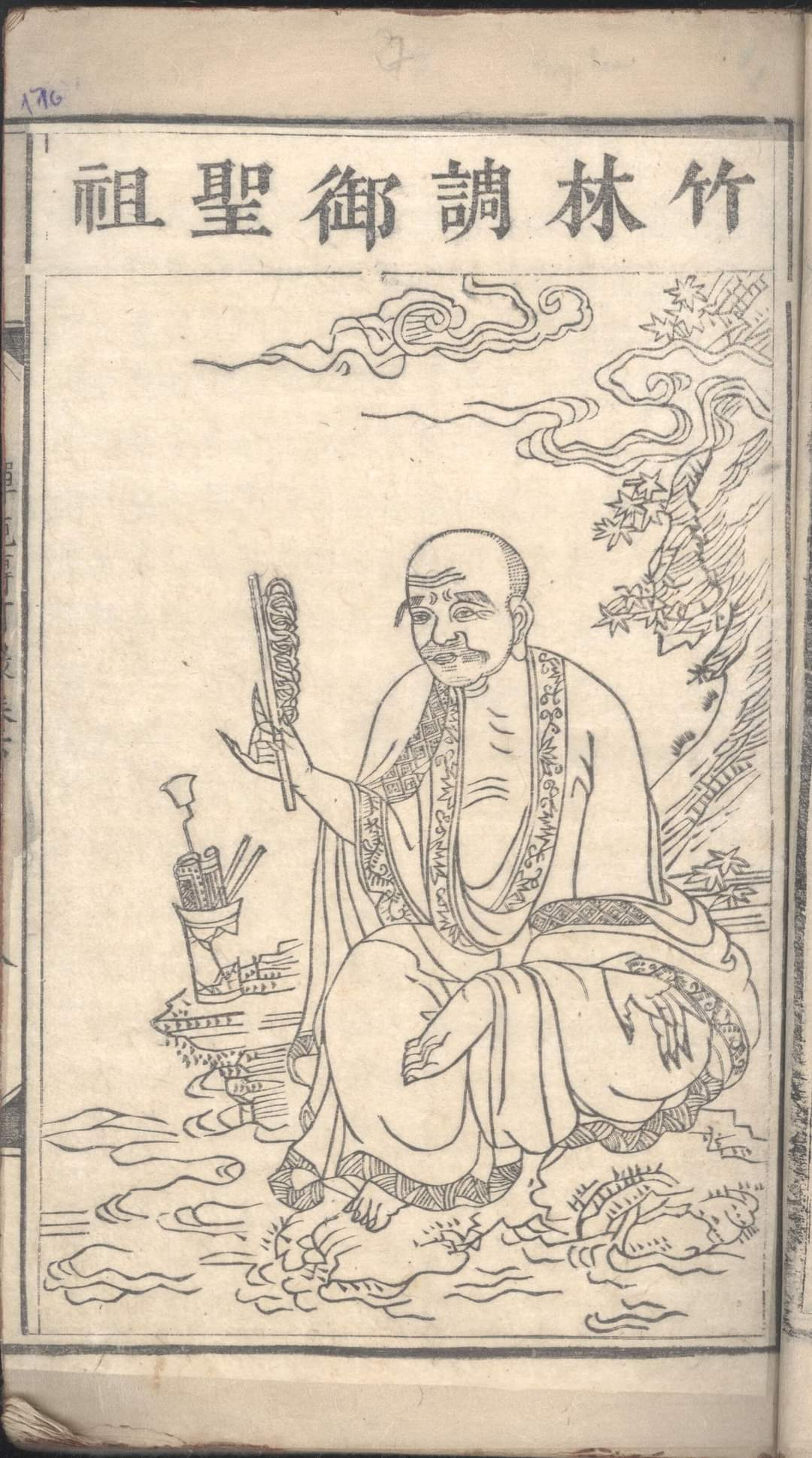
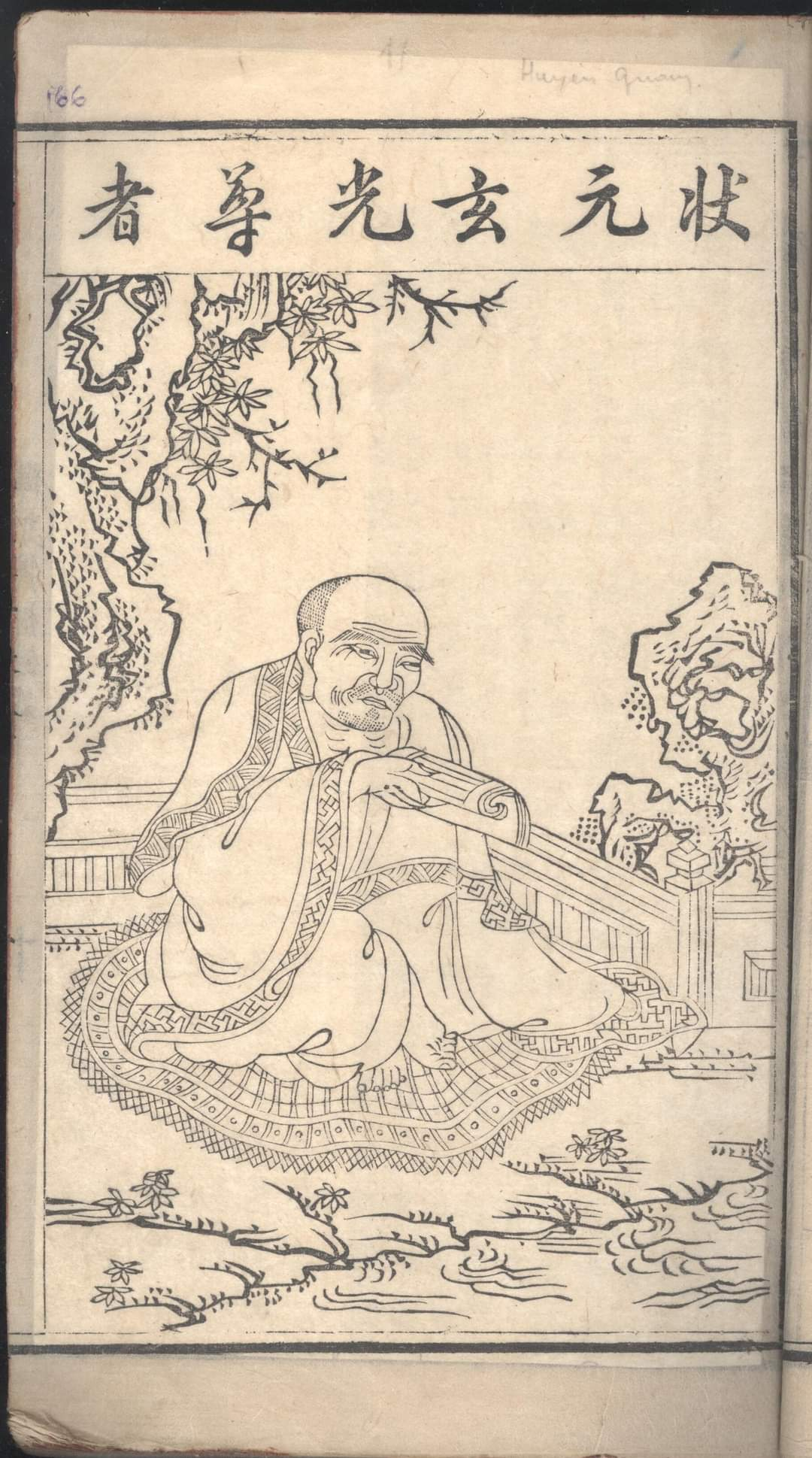
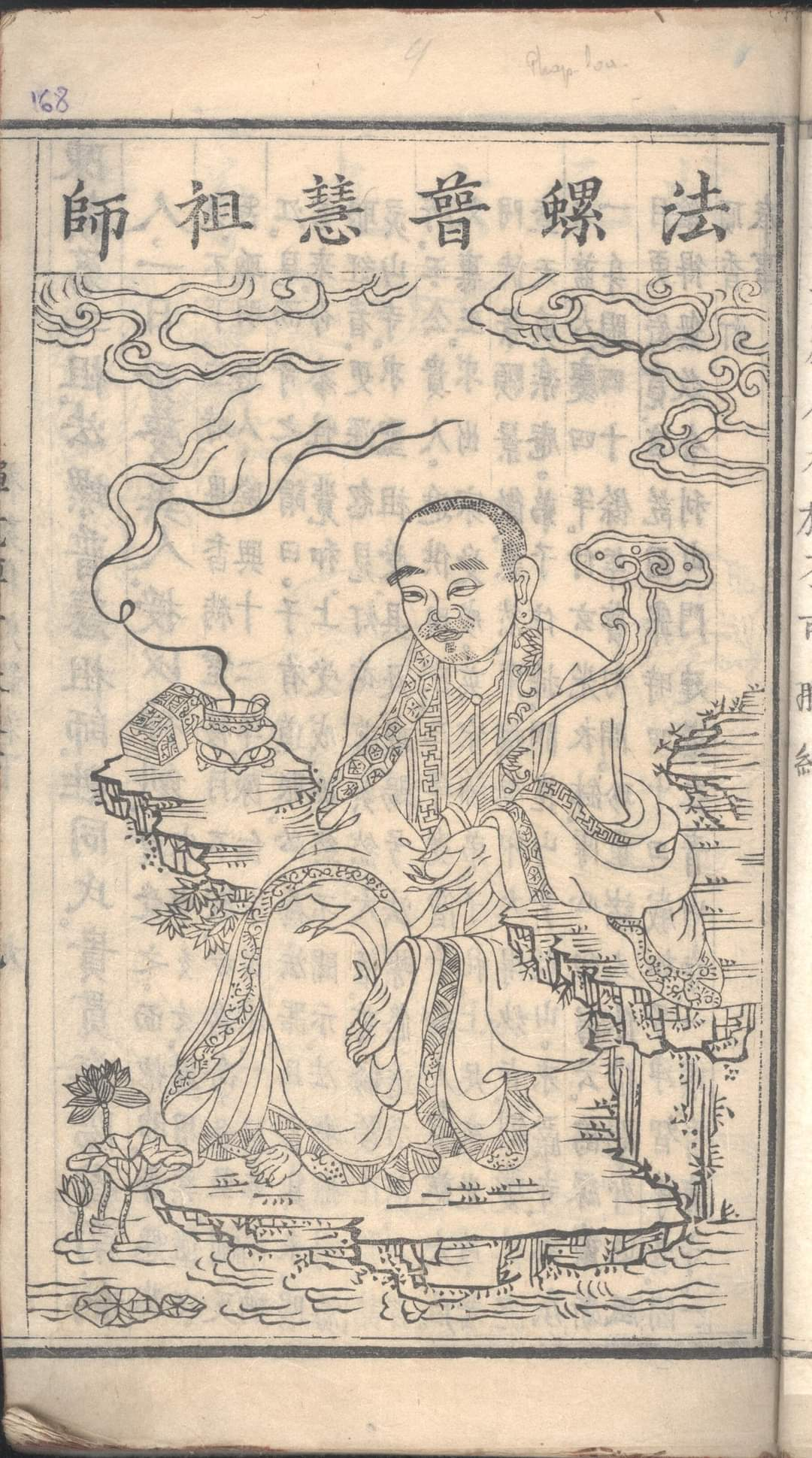
Portraits of three patriarchs of the Trúc Lâm Buddhist school in the book Thiền uyển tập anh, include: Trần Nhân Tông, Huyền Quang and Pháp Loa

Collection of Outstanding Figures of the Zen Garden (chữ Hán: 禪苑集英, Vietnamese: Thiền uyển tập anh) is a Literary Chinese Vietnamese Zen Buddhist biographical text dating to 1337. It connects the history of Buddhism in Vietnam with China and has aspects of a Dharma transmission text modelled on The Transmission of the Lamp genre.
