= Trúc Lâm =

School of Buddhism in Vietnam

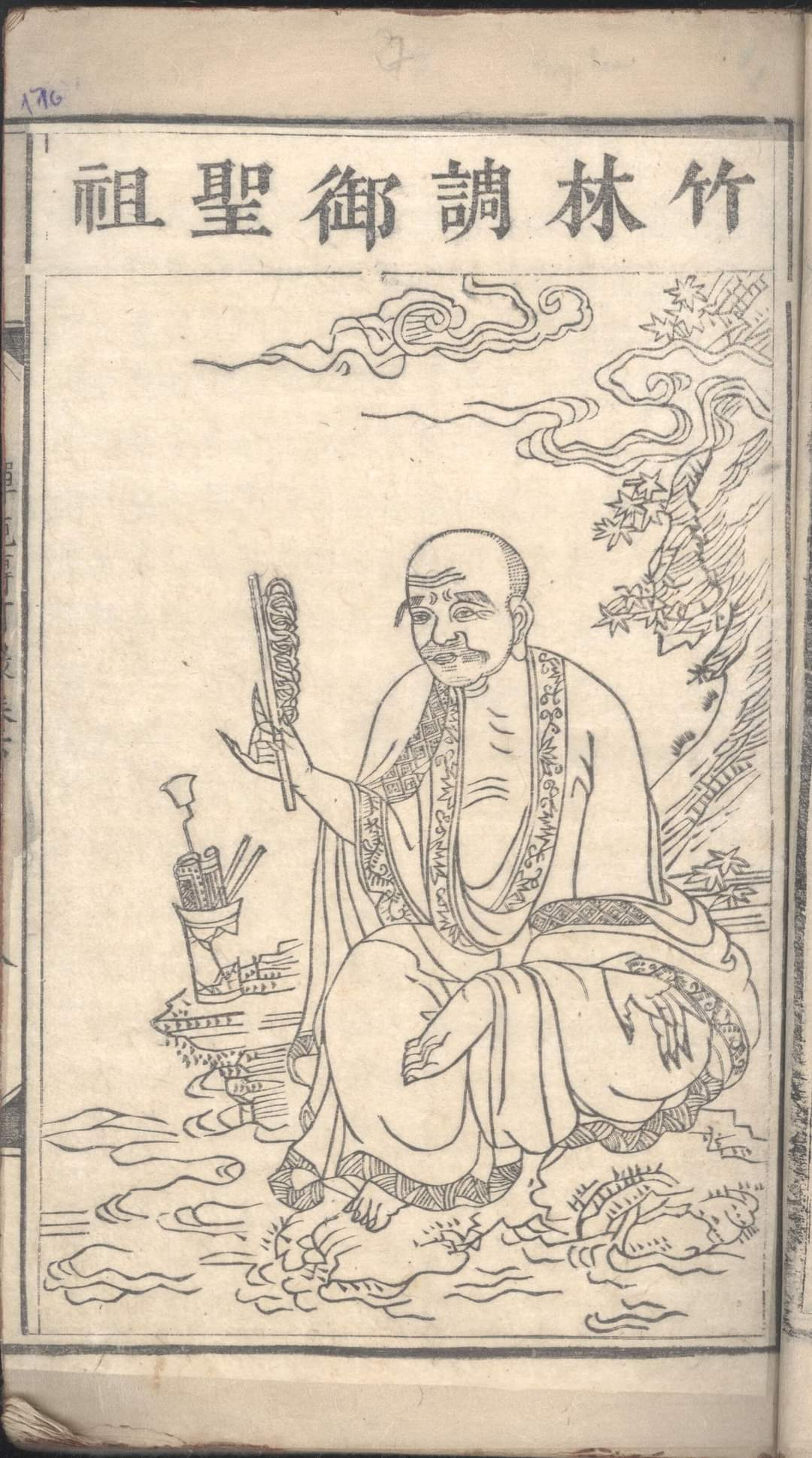
- Emperor Trần Nhân Tông was the founder of the Trúc Lâm Yên Tử school of Thiền Buddhism.
- Vietnamese alphabet: Trúc Lâm Yên Tử
- Chữ Hán: 竹林安子

Trúc Lâm Zen School (Chinese: 竹林禪派), also known as Trúc Lâm Yên Tử (pronounced [tʂuk̚˧˥ lʌm˧ ien˧ tɯ˧˩˧], Chinese: 竹林安子, "Bamboo Grove of Yên Tử"), is a uniquely Vietnamese Thiền (Zen) Buddhist school founded in 1299 during the Trần dynasty by Emperor Trần Nhân Tông (1258–1308). It marked a synthesis of indigenous Vietnamese, Confucian, Taoist, and Mahayana Buddhist traditions.

== History ==
=== Precursors ===
Zen Master Hiện Quang of the Vô Ngôn Thông sect established a center at Yên Tử Mountain. His successor Đạo Viên was granted the title Trúc Lâm Quốc Sư by the young prince Trần Nhân Tông. King Trần Thái Tông himself was deeply influenced by Zen and authored Khóa Hư Lục and Thiền Tông Chỉ Nam.

Đạo Viên's student, National Master Đại Đăng, combined Vietnamese Zen thought with Lâm Tế teachings brought by the Chinese master Thiền Phong. From Đại Đăng came Tiêu Dao, teacher of the lay Zen master Tuệ Trung Thượng Sĩ, a major influence on Trần Nhân Tông.

=== Founding by Trần Nhân Tông ===
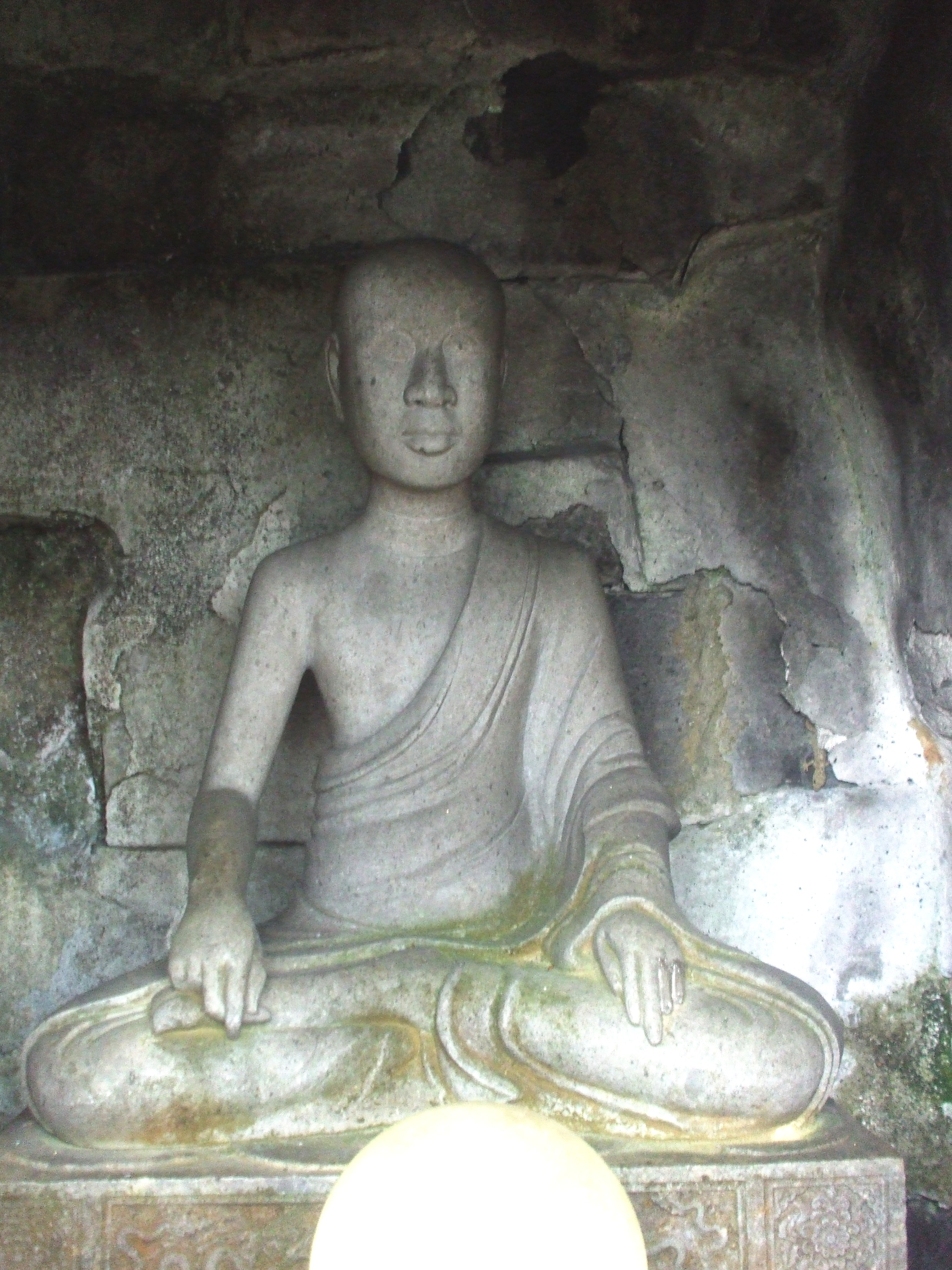
Stone statue of Buddha retired emperor Tran Nhan Tong

After abdicating the throne in 1293, Trần Nhân Tông became a monk and founded the Trúc Lâm sect at Yên Tử Mountain in 1299 under the name Hương Vân Đại Đầu Đà.

He unified various Buddhist sects in Đại Việt and emphasized ethical practice, temple reform, and Zen training. His students included Pháp Loa and Huyền Quang.

=== Pháp Loa ===
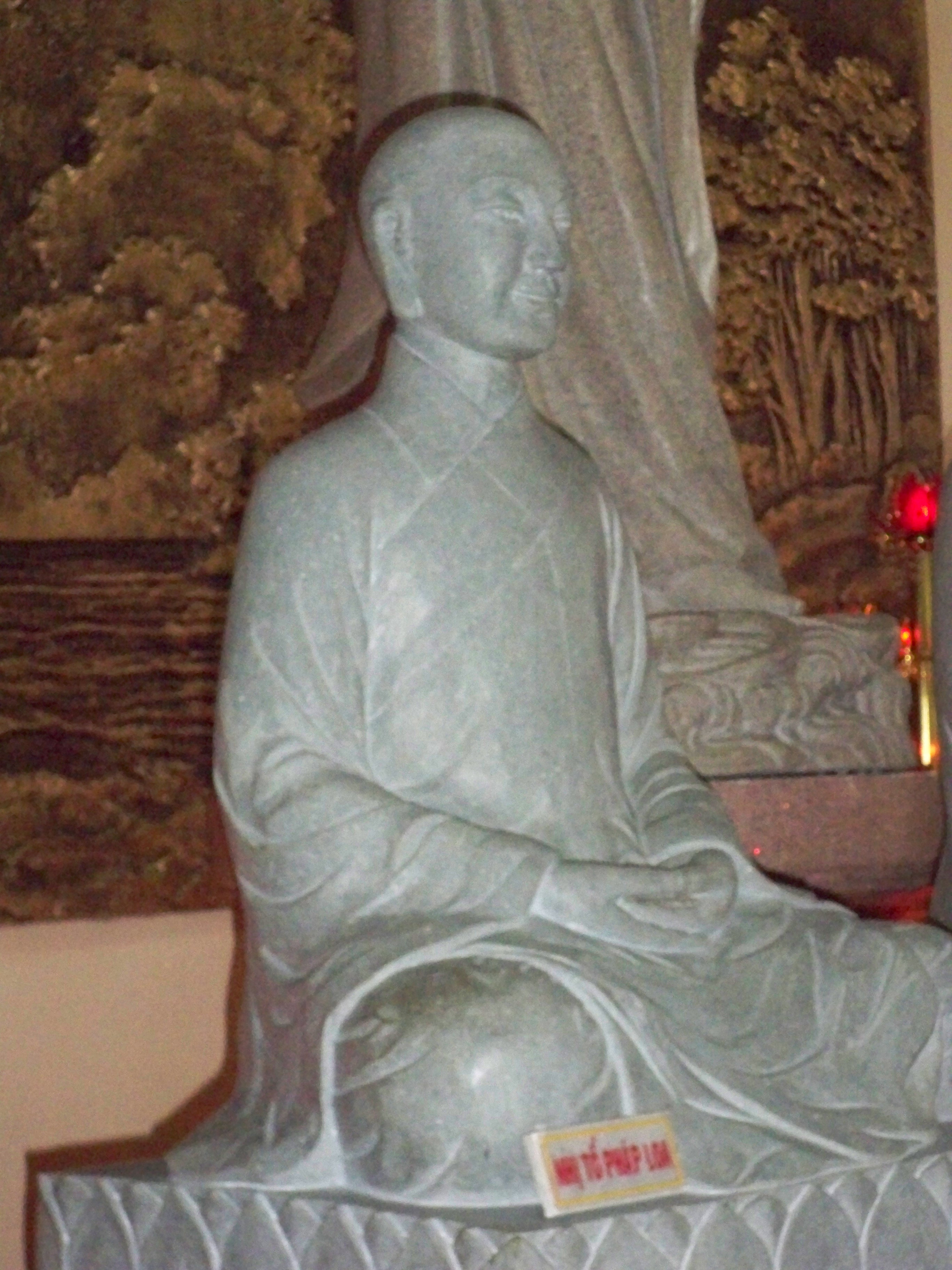
Statue of Zen Master Phap Loa at the ancestral temple of Truc Lam Zen Monastery in Da Lat.

Pháp Loa joined the Sangha at age 21 and later attained enlightenment after intense personal practice. He became the second patriarch, edited Trần Nhân Tông’s teachings into Thạch Thất Mĩ Ngữ, and helped engrave the Tripiṭaka. He ordained over 1,000 monks and trained prominent disciples like Huyền Quang.

=== Huyền Quang ===
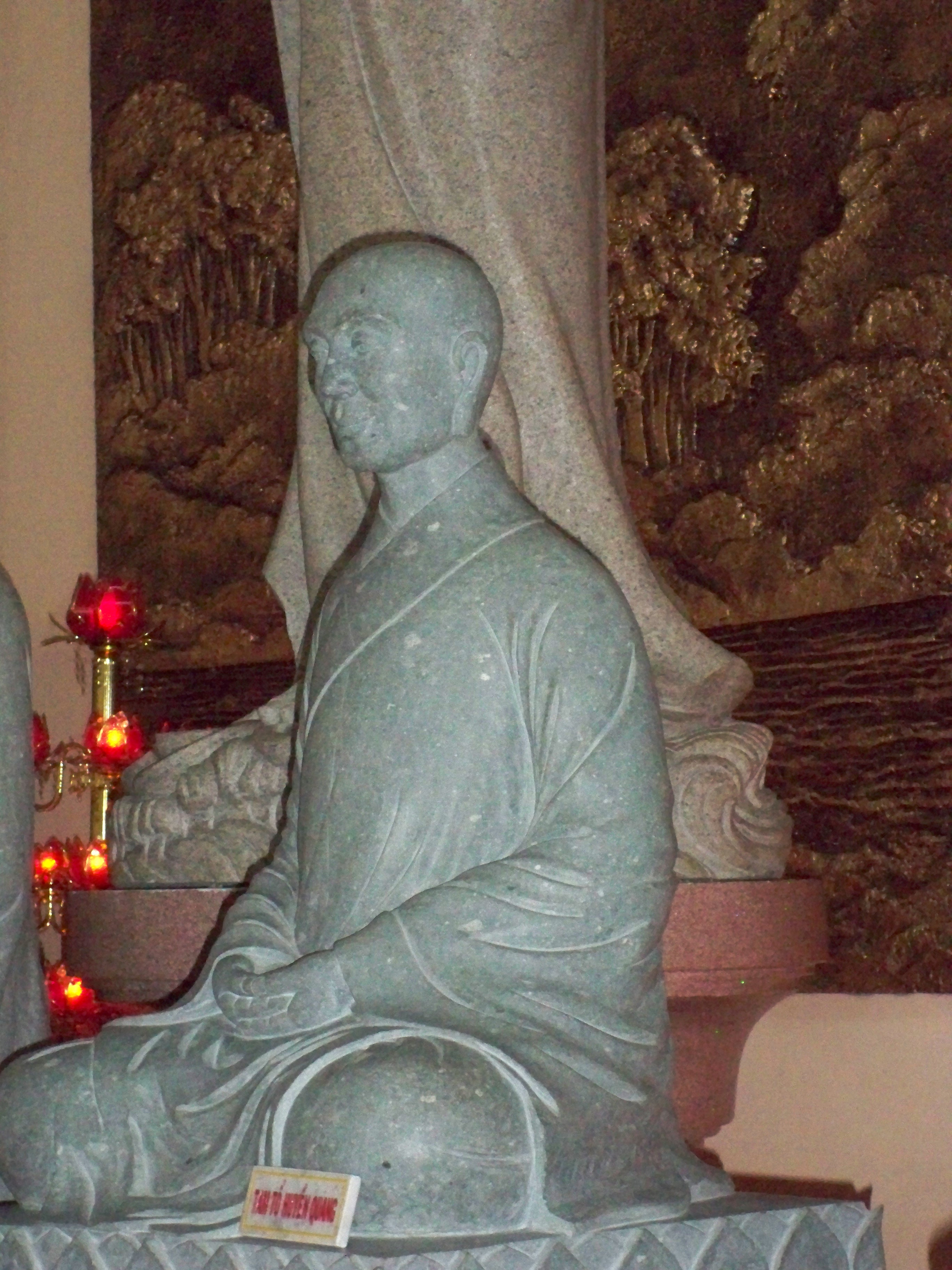
Statue of Zen Master Huyen Quang at the ancestral temple of Truc Lam Zen Monastery in Da Lat.

Originally a high-ranking scholar, Huyền Quang renounced his post to become a monk. He succeeded Pháp Loa as the third patriarch, led Van Yên Temple, and oversaw the production and editing of Zen scriptures. Due to health, he passed the tradition to An Tâm.

== Decline ==
After the Trần dynasty fell, the rise of Confucianism and the Ming invasion led to suppression of Buddhism and destruction of many Zen texts. The Trúc Lâm tradition retreated into seclusion in Yên Tử and gradually declined. Only lineage records survive in the Thiền Uyển Tập Anh.

== Revival ==
During the Lê Trung Hưng period, Master Chân Nguyên Tuệ Đăng revived interest in Trúc Lâm texts. Under the Tây Sơn dynasty, scholar Ngô Thì Nhậm (1746–1803) promoted Trúc Lâm as a unifying spiritual path, harmonizing the "Three teachings" of Buddhism, Confucianism, and Taoism.

== Modern Trúc Lâm ==
Zen Master Thích Thanh Từ is credited with the modern revival of Trúc Lâm. He established many monasteries in Vietnam and abroad, spreading a modern form of Vietnamese Zen based on Trần Nhân Tông, Pháp Loa, and Huyền Quang’s teachings. Though rooted in Trúc Lâm heritage, he also draws from other sources:

- Lục Diệu Pháp Môn (Six Dharma Gates), by Zhiyi
- Ngũ Đình Tâm Quán from the *Zuòchán Sānmèi Jīng*
- Tham Thiền Yếu Chỉ by Xuyun, emphasizing Hua Tou (thoại đầu)

Thích Thanh Từ’s influence made him the most prominent Vietnamese Zen master in recent times.

== Lineage holders ==
The following is the lineage of the Truc Lam Zen sect in Dai nam thien uyen truyen dang luc (zh. 大南禪苑傳燈錄), edited by monk Phuc Dien (zh. 福田):

1. Zen master Điều Ngự Giác Hoàng (Tran Nhan Tong)
2. Zen master Phổ Tuệ Minh Giác (Phap Loa)
3. Zen master Huyền Quang
4. Zen master An Tam (zh. 安心)
5. Zen master Phù Vân Tĩnh Lự (zh. 浮雲靜慮)
6. Zen master Vô Trước (zh. 無著)
7. Zen master Quốc Nhất (zh. 國一)
8. Zen master Viên Minh (zh. 圓明)
9. Zen Master Đạo Huệ (zh. 道惠)
10. Zen Master Viên Ngộ (zh. 圓遇)
11. Zen Master Tổng Trì (zh. 總持)
12. Zen Master Khuê Sâm (zh. 珪琛, or Khuê Thám)
13. Zen Master Sơn Đăng (zh. 山燈, or Sơn Đằng)
14. Zen Master Hương Sơn (zh. 香山)
15. Zen Master Trí Dung (zh. 智容)
16. Zen Master Huệ Quang (zh. 慧 光)
17. Zen Master Chân Trụ (zh. 真住, or Chân Trú)
18. Zen Master Vô Phiền (zh. 無煩)
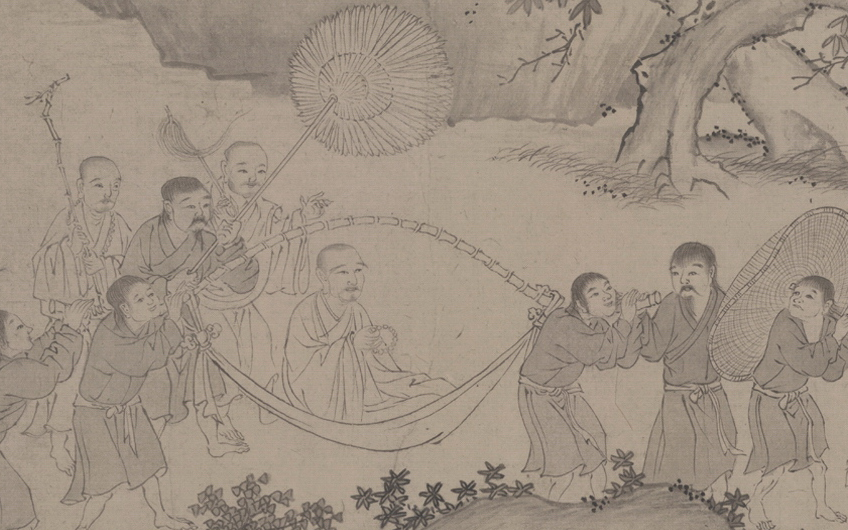
  A corner of the painting "Truc Lam Dai Si Xuat Son Do", The painting depicts Tran Nhan Tong leaving the Vu Lam palace for a trip

== Important centers ==
=== Ancient Truc Lam Zen relics ===
- Yen Tu scenic relic complex (Quang Ninh)
- Vu Lam Palace (Ninh Binh)
- Con Son Pagoda (Hai Duong)
- Quynh Lam Pagoda (Quang Ninh)
- Ba An Sieu Loai Pagoda (Hanoi)
- Ba Vang Pagoda (Quang Ninh)
- Vinh Nghiem Pagoda (Bac Giang)
- Bo Da Pagoda (Bac Giang)

=== Truc Lam Zen Monasteries today ===
In recent years, a new form of religious institution has emerged, associated with the Truc Lam Zen sect, which is the Truc Lam Zen Monasteries founded by the monk Thich Thanh Tu initiated. This is also a form of honoring and sublimating the Truc Lam Zen sect in modern social life.

- Truc Lam Yen Tu Zen Monastery
- Truc Lam Bach Ma Zen Monastery
- Truc Lam Giac Tam Zen Monastery
- Truc Lam Phuong Hoang Zen Monastery
- Truc Lam Tay Thien Zen Monastery
- Truc Lam Chanh Giac Zen Monastery
- Truc Lam Da Lat Zen Monastery
- Sung Phuc Zen Monastery
- Truc Lam Ham Rong Zen Monastery
- Truc Lam Tue Duc Zen Monastery
- Truc Lam Chinh France
- Truc Lam Dai Giac Zen Monastery
- Truc Lam Bac Lieu Zen Monastery
- Truc Lam Phu Yen Zen Monastery
- Truc Lam Ca Mau Zen Monastery
- Truc Lam Tu Duong
- Truc Lam Dai Dang Zen Monastery (USA)
- Truc Lam Tri Duc Zen Monastery
- Truc Lam Tri Duc - Nuns Zen Monastery
- Truc Lam Thanh Nguyen Zen Monastery
- Truc Lam Long Duc Zen Monastery
- Truc Lam An Giang Zen Monastery
- Truc Lam Hien Quang Zen Monastery
- Truc Lam Chanh Thien Zen Monastery
- Truc Lam Phat Dang Zen Monastery
- Truc Lam Vien Ngo Zen Monastery
- Truc Lam Tu Giac Zen Monastery
- Truc Lam Dao Nguyen Zen Monastery
- Truc Lam Thap Muoi Zen Monastery
- Truc Lam Tay Ninh Zen Monastery
- Truc Lam Chan Nguyen Zen Monastery
- Thuong Chieu Zen Monastery
- An Lac Zen Monastery
- Dao Hue Zen Monastery
- Linh Chieu Zen Monastery
- Vien Chieu Zen Monastery
- Hue Chieu Zen Monastery
- Zen Monastery Chon Khong
- Chan Nguyen Zen Monastery
- Tue Quang Zen Monastery
- Lieu Duc Zen Monastery
- Pho Chieu Zen Monastery
- Phuc Truong Zen Monastery
- Phuoc Hoa Zen Monastery
- Phuoc Lac Zen Monastery

== Gallery ==
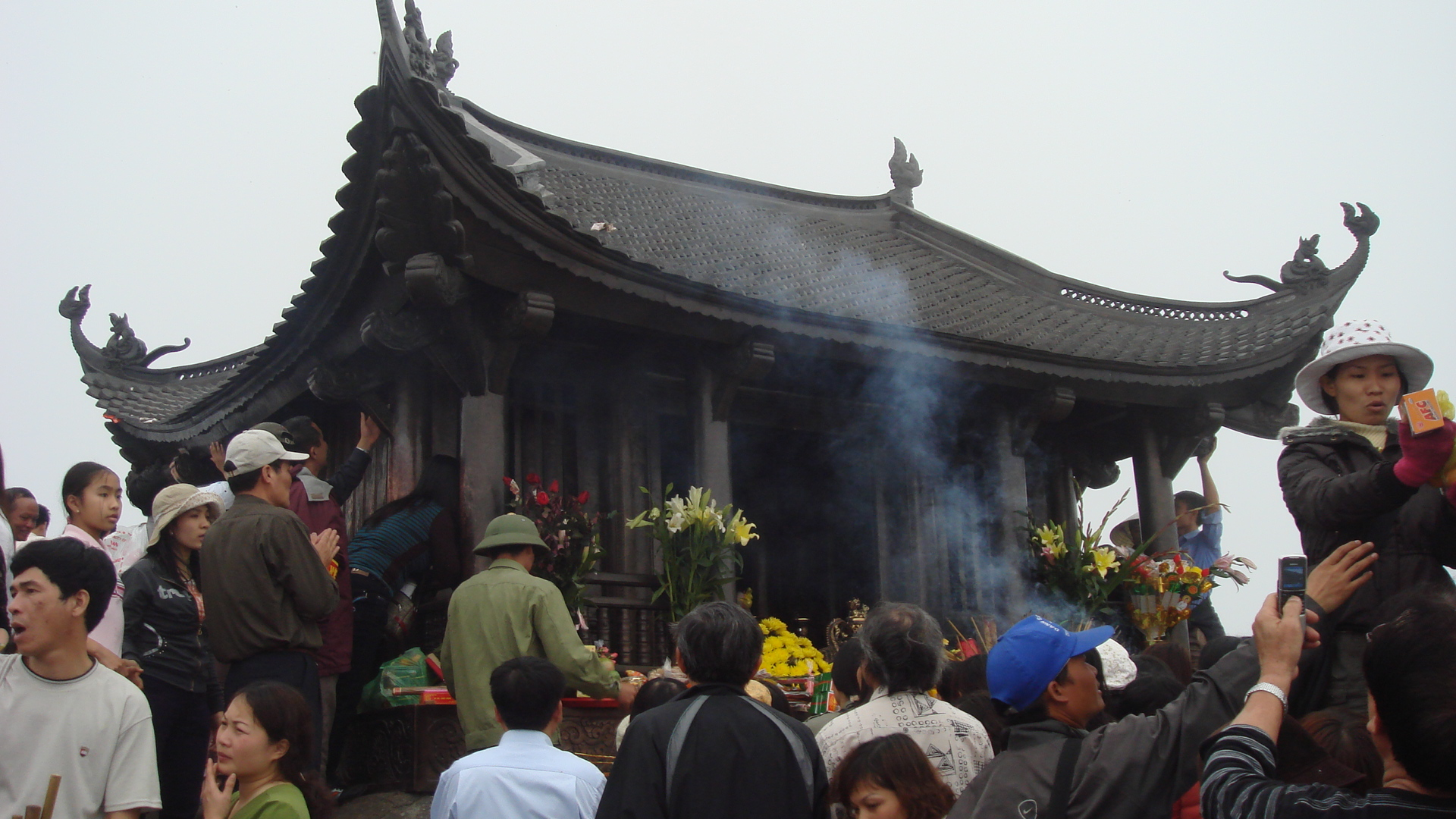
Chùa Đồng (Bronze Temple) on Yên Tử Mountain

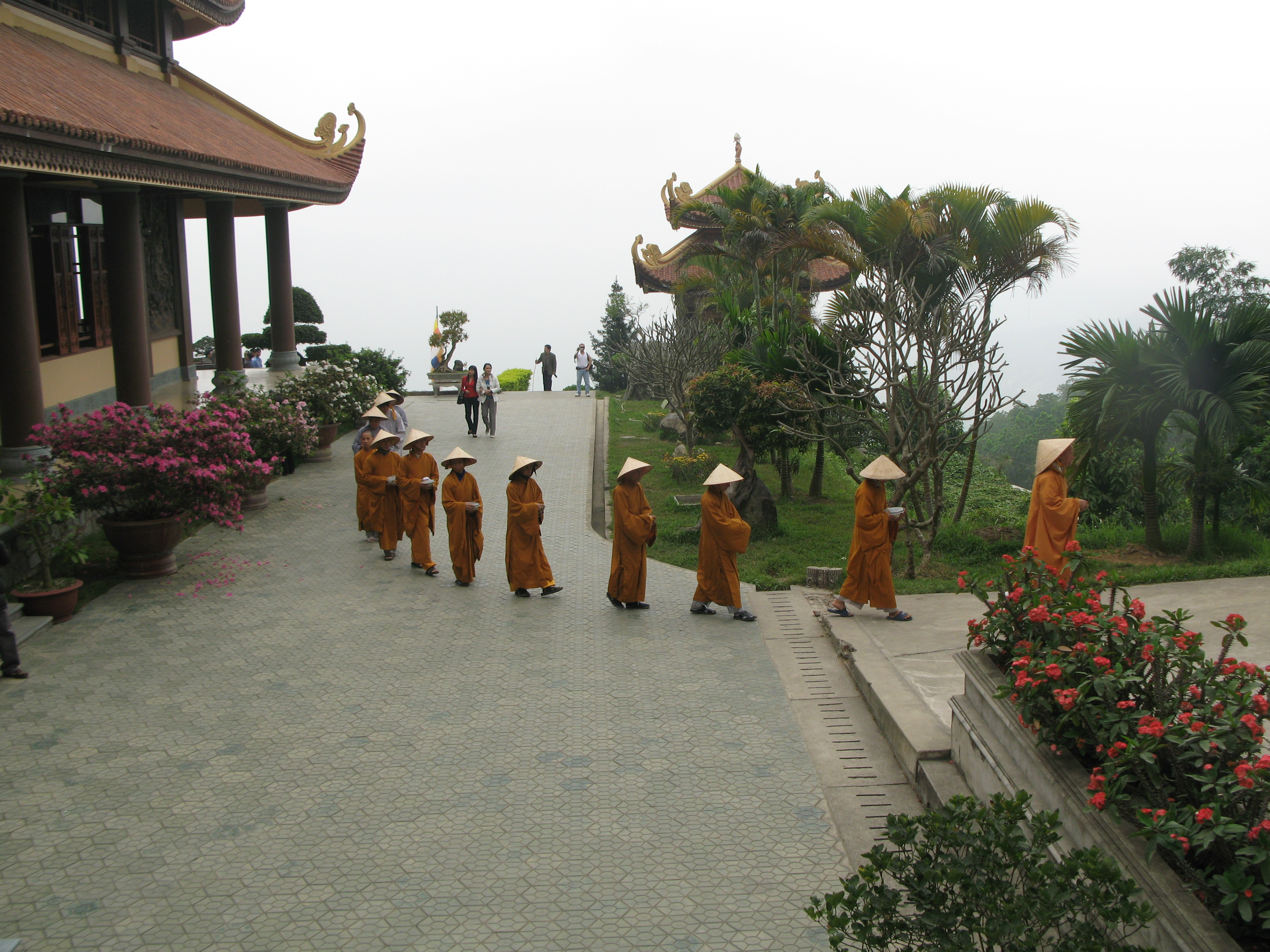
Monks of the Trúc Lâm school of Buddhism of Tây Thiên Zen Monastery are on their way to the refectory

== See also ==
- Yên Tử Mountain
- Thiền
- Vietnamese Buddhism
- Lâm Tế tông
- Three Teachings
