= Trần dynasty military tactics and organization =

During the Mongol invasions of Vietnam the Trần dynasty (1225–1400) successful employed military tactics and strategies including scorched earth and hit and run tactics designed to take advantage of terrain.

== Organization ==
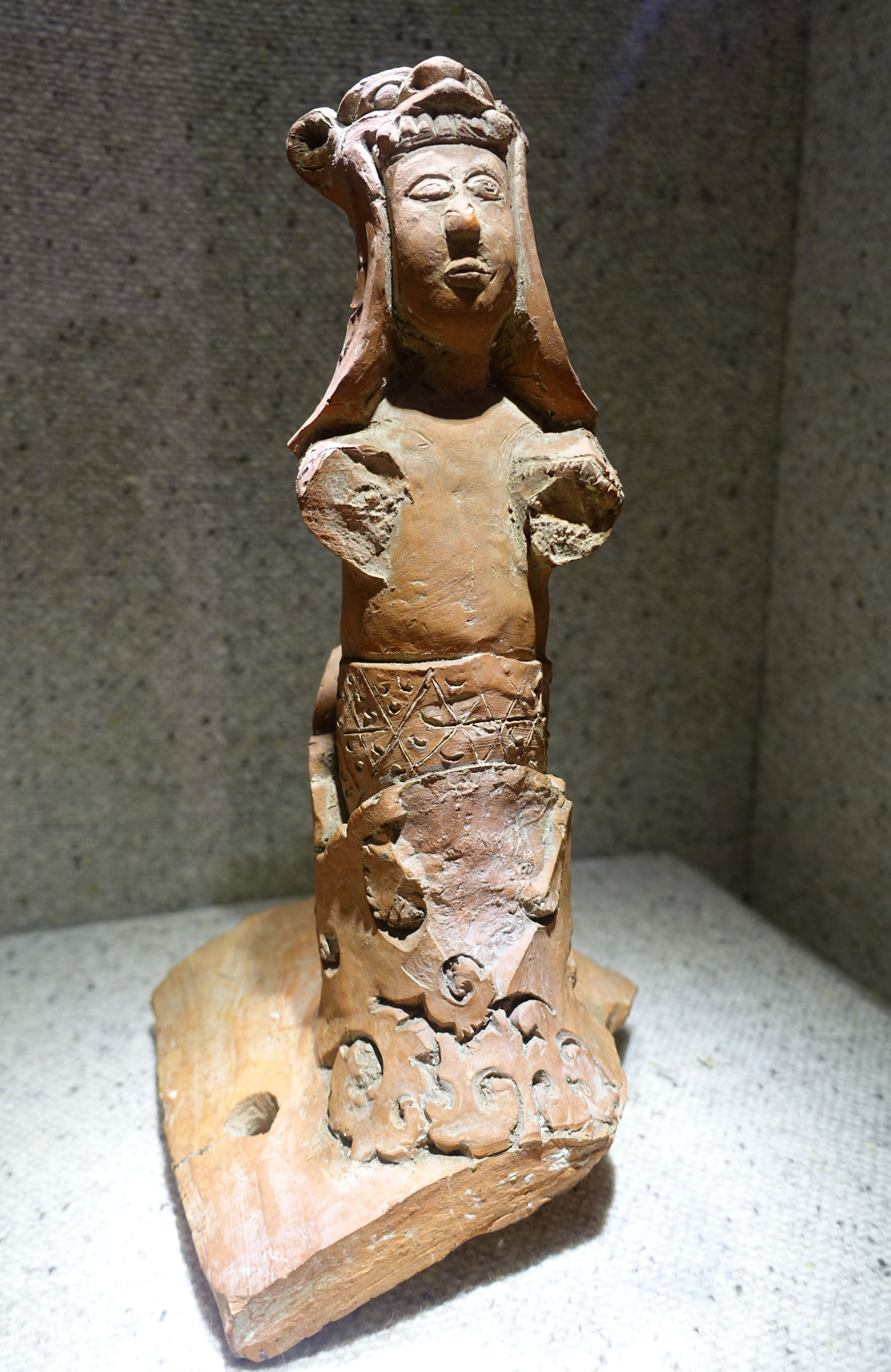
Statue of a Vietnamese military mandarin in the Trần dynasty

The Royal Vietnamese army had a military force of up to 100,000 soldiers in 1281.

=== Army ===
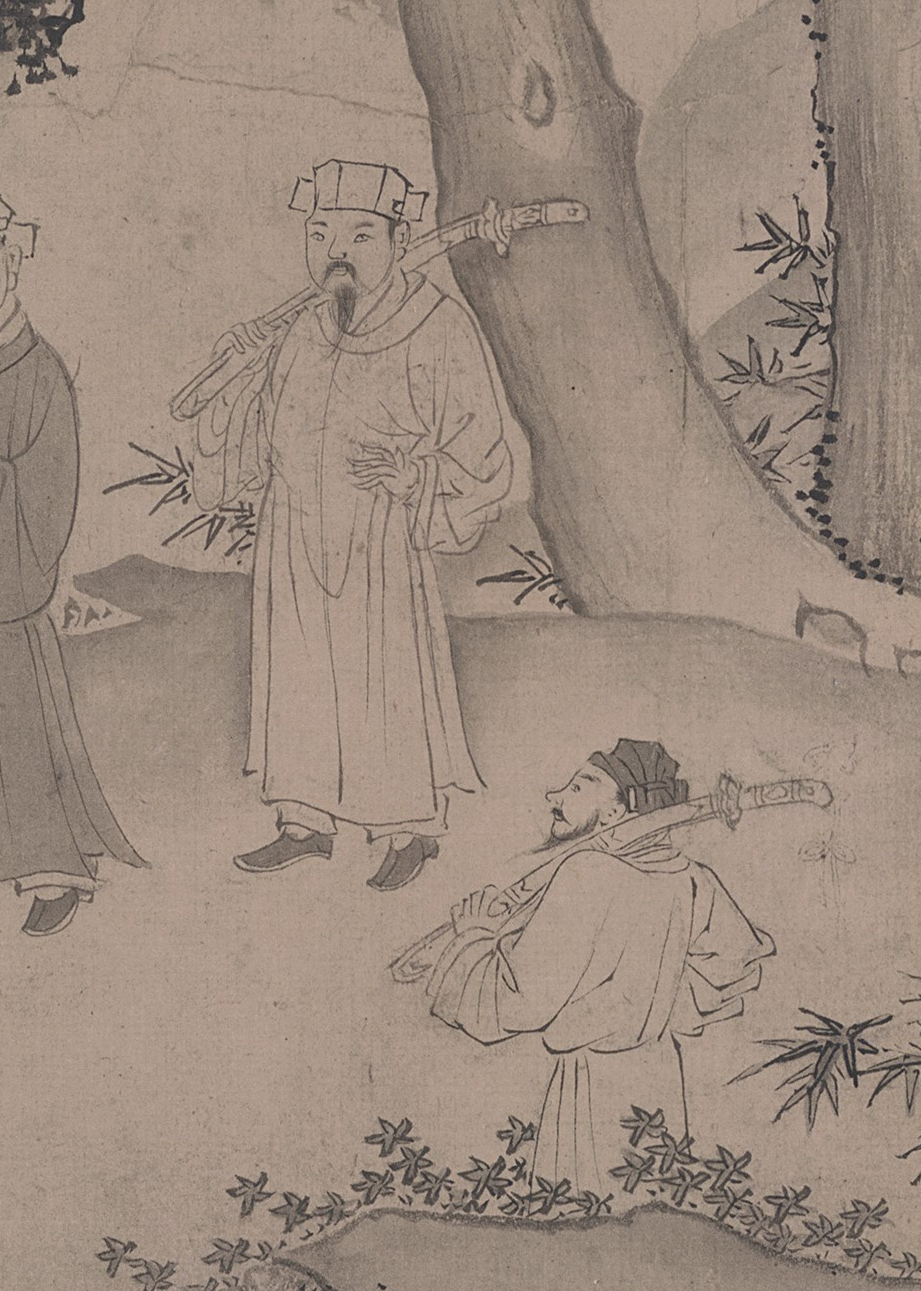
Vietnamese military officers during Lý-Trần dynasties.

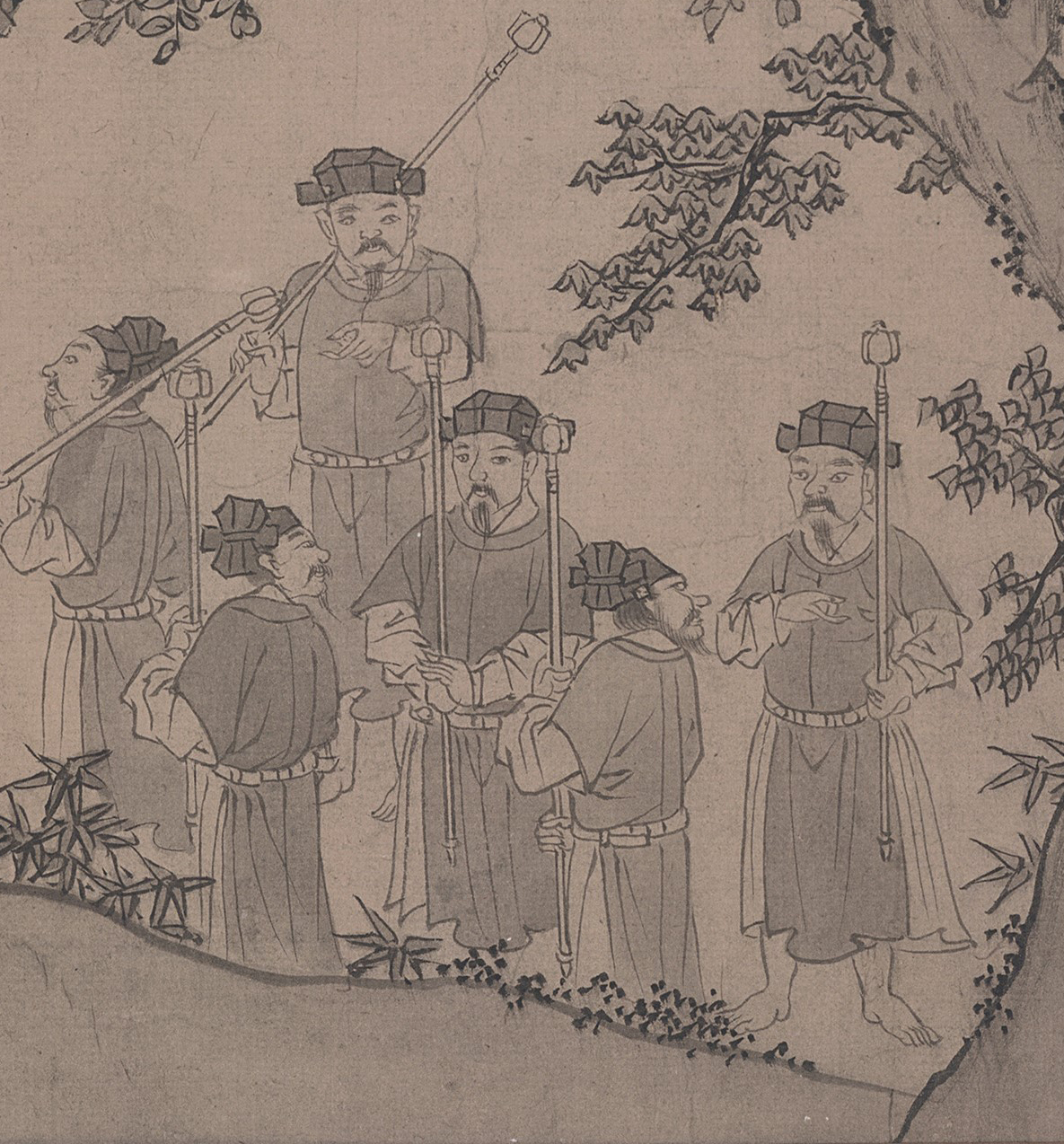
Vietnamese Royal Guards during Lý-Trần dynasties. Typical the medieval Vietnamese army consisted mostly light-armored troops, but were capable for navy and maritime-warfare.

- Cấm quân (Royal army): about 20,000
- Lộ quân (Local army): about 80,000

Military Title	Number of Men
Ngũ	5
Đô	80
Quân	2,400

==== Cấm quân ====
Cấm quân was the force guarding the city of Thăng Long, the capital of Đại Việt. Below are a list of Cấm quân:

1. Thiên Thuộc
2. Thiên Cương
3. Chương Thánh
4. Củng Thần
5. Thánh Dực
6. Thần Sách

==== Lộ quân ====
Lộ quân was the force protecting the "Lộ" (administrative divisions in the Trần dynasty period). Every "Lộ" had one Quân and 20 support units called "Phong đoàn", of about 120 soldiers. Below are a list of Lộ quân:

1. Thiên Trường
2. Long Hưng
3. Quốc Oai
4. Bắc Giang
5. Hải Đông
6. Trường Yên
7. Kiến Xương
8. Hồng
9. Khoái
10. Thanh Hóa
11. Hoàng Giang
12. Diễn Châu

=== Navy ===
During the interwar periods, the Royal Vietnamese Navy consisted of two divisions:

- Đông Hải Quân (Eastern navy) consisted of 2,400 sailors who fought at sea, on rivers, and on beaches.
- Bình Hải Quân consisted of a "Quân", supported by 900 sailors on 30 sailboats, who fought at sea, on islands and at river mouths. Its headquarters was located on the island of Vân Đồn.

The total number of Trần naval vessels is uncertain. However, figures from the Battle of Vạn Kiếp (11 February 1285) hint at a sizeable fleet, as the Vietnamese navy maintained over 1,000 medium-sized river sailboats.

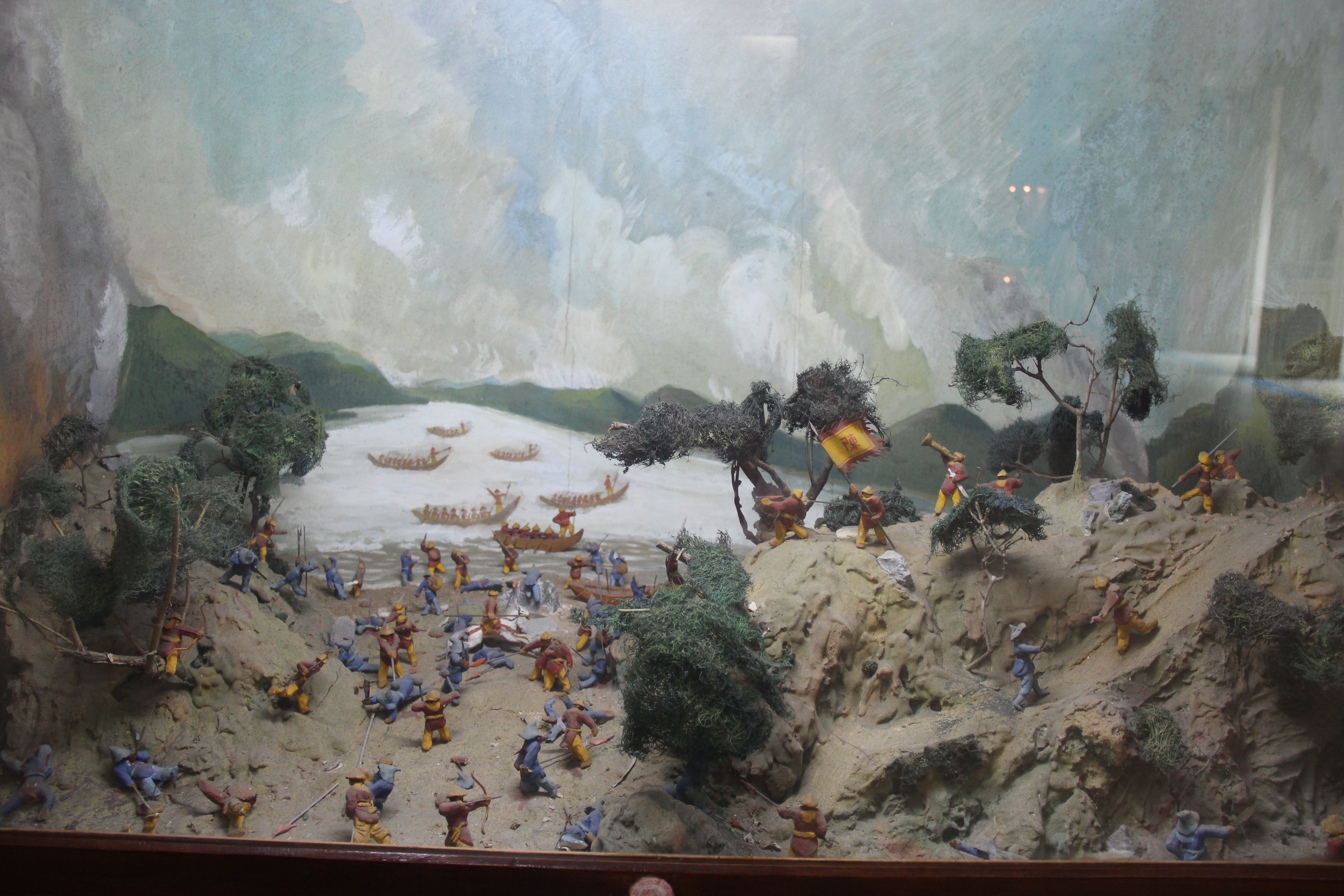
Battle of Vạn Kiếp, Second Defeat of Mongol Invasion

=== Other forces ===
- Sương quân was an army of a rich family or of the sovereign, personally, but not of the Trần royal dynasty.
- Vương hầu quân was an army recruited by royal nobles, who trained and equipped it themselves. According to royal law, there could have been about 1,000 of them. Their forces played an important role during the Mongol Invasion.

== Military policy ==
An important military policy of the Trần dynasty was "Ngụ binh ư nông" (Hán văn: 寓兵於農, meaning: "Soldiers living among farmers"), a variation of militia or citizen-soldier system. Under this policy, a part of the military force was maintained permanently, which serve the royal house. While the remaining military forces was often work in their farm. This part of the force can be called by the emperor when under threat of invasion.

In 1284, the Trần dynasty forces consisted of 200,000 soldiers in anticipation of a Mongol invasion.

== Strategy ==
The Trần continued and passed on known Vietnamese military traditions, such as asymmetry, elusive face-to-face combat and enemy attrition. Soldiers were believed to have strong support from the Vietnamese population.

=== People's war ===
During the Mongol invasions of Đại Việt, historical accounts describe widespread mobilization in defense of the kingdom. This collective effort is reflected in the Vietnamese slogan "Cử quốc nghênh địch" ("The whole country face to face with the enemy"), which has been cited by historians as emblematic of the national response to foreign threat.

At the Diên Hồng conference, when the Đại Việt emperor asked: "Should we surrender or fight?", the unanimous response of all members of Trần royalty, military commanders and senior counsellors was: "Fight!".This account is frequently cited in Vietnamese historical education and national memory.

Soldiers of the Trần dynasty tattooed two words in Hán văn on their hands 殺韃. In modern Vietnamese, this is: "Sát Thát" (meaning: "Kill Mongolians").

=== Scorched earth ===
Thăng Long, capital of Đại Việt, was captured on all cases of Mongolians invasion. However, historical sources widely believed this was an intentional decision by the Vietnamese's military forces, as they anticipated the city's vulnerability and withdraw early. As a part of this approach, Vietnamese employed scorched earth tactic (evacuating civilians, supplies and destroy infrastructures) to deny resources to the invader. This strategy was called in Vietnamese: "Vườn không nhà trống" ("Both garden and house are empty").

=== Long days war ===
The most common tactic of the Vietnamese was to prolong the war, causing the Mongolian enemy to become bogged down in the rainy season. This resulted in the Mongolians becoming infected with tropical diseases, and to deplete their war resources, as in the Vietnamese expression: "Lấy sức nhàn thắng sức mỏi" ("Our troops in good health smite the tired enemy troops").

== Tactics ==
=== Advantage of terrain, hit and run, and ambushes ===
Throughout the war, the Vietnamese military avoided direct confrontation, but instead letting Mongolian army move deep into Đại Việt territory. They made use of their understanding of their territory, and the advantages of terrain. They built secret bases to hide in, and ambush points where they fought. The Vietnamese army also built secret bases and made ambush points to fight. With this advantage, the Vietnamese attack and defense were very flexible. While both side used hit and run, Vietnamese advantage in their own territory allow them to win more exchange.

In the Battle of Bạch Đằng, the Vietnamese used hit and run tactics, lured Mongol battleships into ambush on Bạch Đằng river, and defeated them.

=== Attack enemy logistics ===
The Vietnamese continually attacked the enemy's military logistics. Due to the Mongols large army, (500,000 soldiers and support personnel), the Mongols had substantial logistical needs, which became a point the Vietnamese force used during their resistance.

In the third Mongol invasion of Đại Việt, the invading army used 70 transport ships, and brought 170,000 koku of provender with them. It is believed that Vietnamese leadership guessed that the Mongols sought to wage war without logistics problems. The Vietnamese and the Mongol fought a naval battle upon arrival, in which the majority of Mongols' transport ships were almost all sunk. This drastic disruption on Mongolian army's supply caused the force to retreat.

=== Counter-offensive ===
The Vietnamese forces frequently launched counter-offensives against the Mongols.

== List of wars and battles ==
=== Wars with the Mongols ===
- Mongol-Vietnamese War
  - Naval battle:
    - Battle of Vân Đồn (11 February 1285)
    - Battle of Bình Than (14 February 1285)
    - Battle of Bạch Đằng (1288)

=== War with Champa ===
- Cham-Vietnamese War (1367–1390)
  - Battle of Vijaya 1377

=== Civil war ===
- Coup d'état of Hồ Quý Ly

== See also ==
- Hịch tướng sĩ
- Ming invasion of Đại Ngu
