= Royal Vietnamese army =

Royal Vietnamese Army
- Active: 938–1789
- Country: Kingdoms of Jinghai and Đại Việt
- Branch: Royal Guards; Siege; Elephant; Cavalry; Infantry; Navy
- Type: Army, Navy
- Role: Military force
- Size: 250,000 men at its height in 1471
- Engagements: Battle of Bạch Đằng (938); Sino-Vietnamese Wars (981, 1059, 1075-1076, 1406-1427, 1789); Cham–Vietnamese wars Khmer–Vietnamese War; Mongol invasions Laotian–Vietnamese War; Dutch–Nguyen war (1637–1643)

Commanders
- Colonel of the Regiment: Vietnamese Emperor
- Notable commanders: Ngô Quyền, Đinh Bộ Lĩnh, Lê Hoàn, Lý Thái Tông, Trần Quốc Tuấn, Lê Lợi, Lê Thánh Tông

The Royal Vietnamese army was the primary military body of the Vietnamese states of Jinghai and Đại Việt and the armed forces of the Vietnamese monarchy from 938 to 1789. It was disbanded and succeeded by the Imperial Vietnamese army of the Nguyễn dynasty in early 19th century.

== Organisation ==
=== Military branches ===
- Infantry
  - Conscripted-soldiers
- War elephants
- Light cavalry
- Navy

=== Strength ===
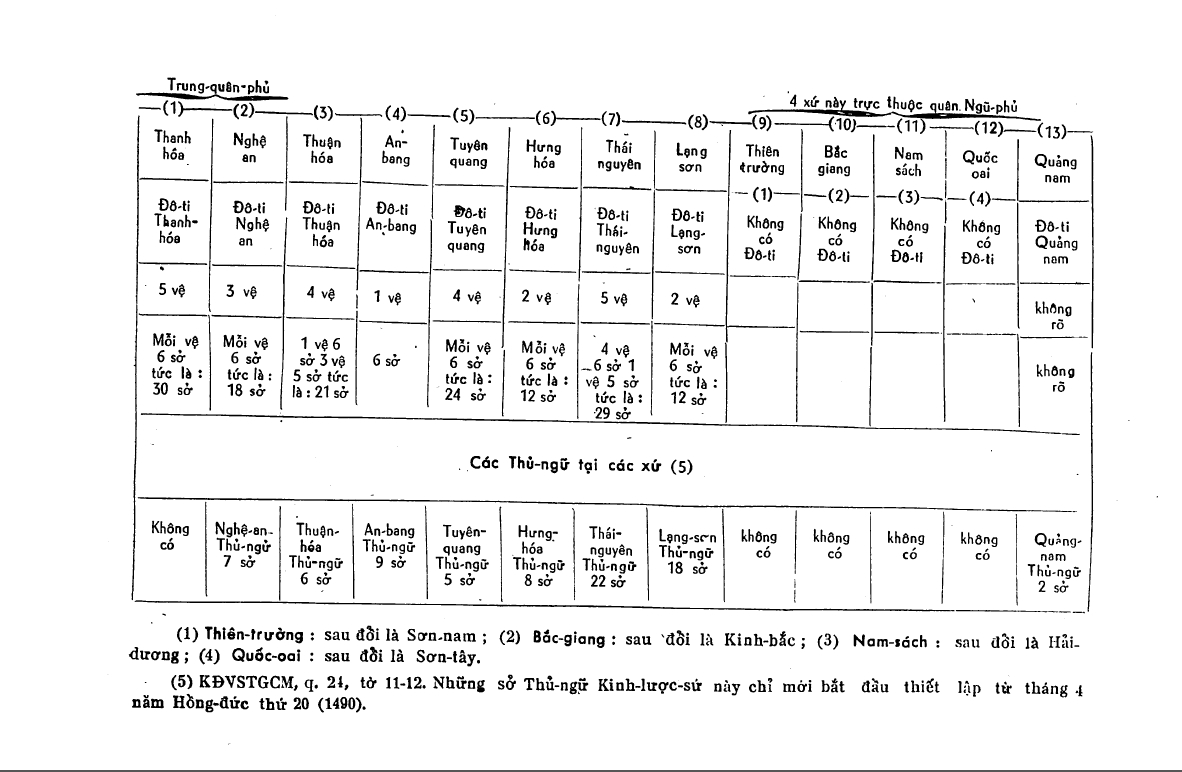
Military organisation during the reign of Lê Thánh Tông (1460-1497)

Conscription was firstly introduced and used in Vietnam by emperor Lý Thái Tông in 1042. For a detachment of 50 men, 30 were sent back to their native villages for rice cultivation. The soldiers did receive some largesse at the same time as they were expected to do some farming of their own. The Royal Vietnamese army at wars grew from 30,000 in 967 to about 80,000 in 1075; 100,000 in 1285; 120,000 in 1377 and 250,000 in 1471.

== Military equipment ==
=== 939–1407 ===
==== Siege techniques ====
- Catapult
- Primitive tanks
- Traction trebuchet (Mongol trebuchet)

==== Navy ====
- Mong Dong
- Junk

==== Firearm ====
- Fire lance (at least 14th century)
- Hand cannon (at least since 1390)

==== Gallery ====
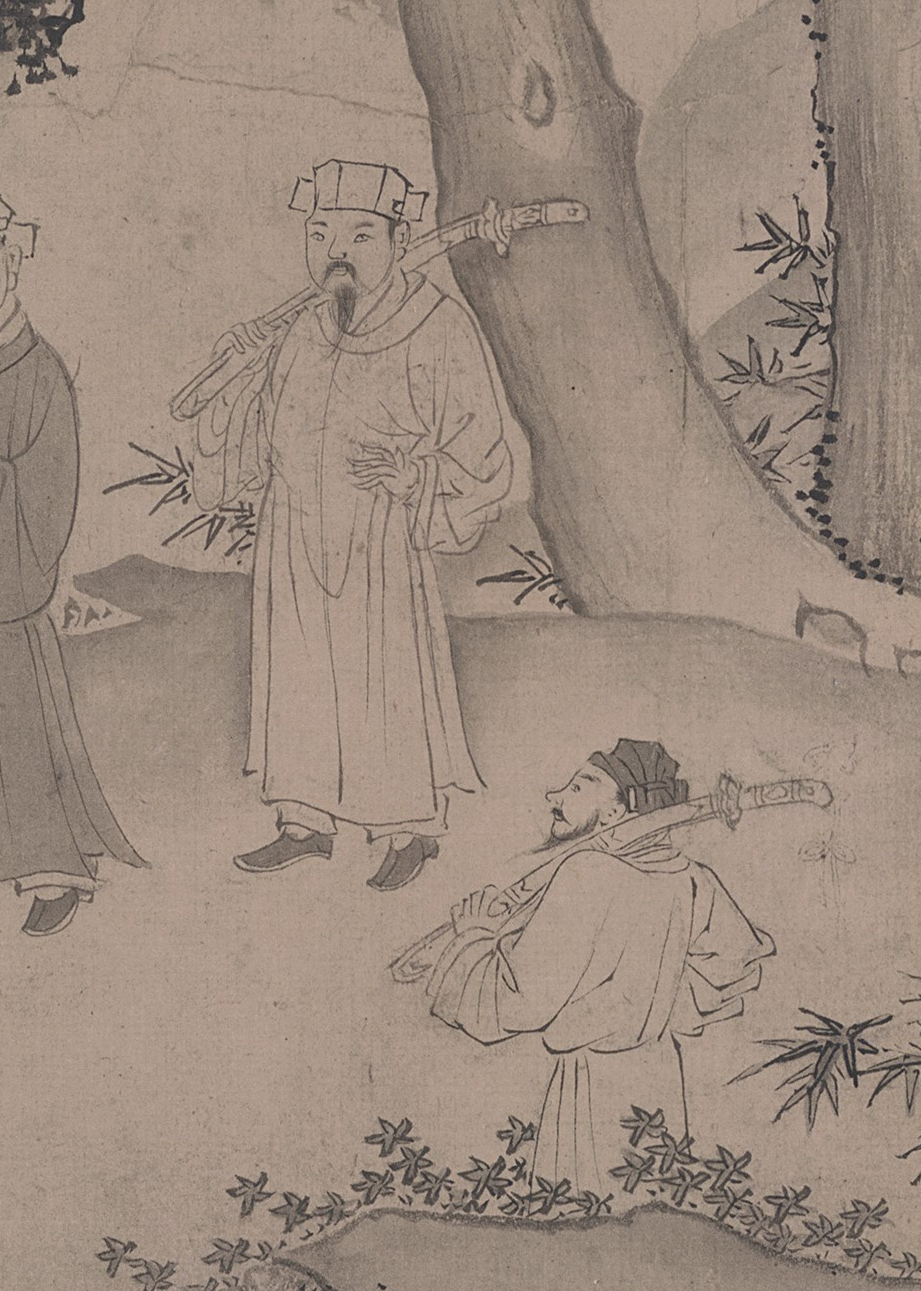
13th century Viet military officers holding gươm (saber)

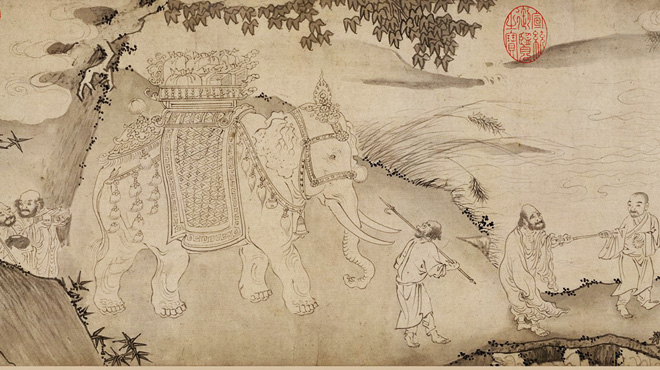
Vietnamese war elephant

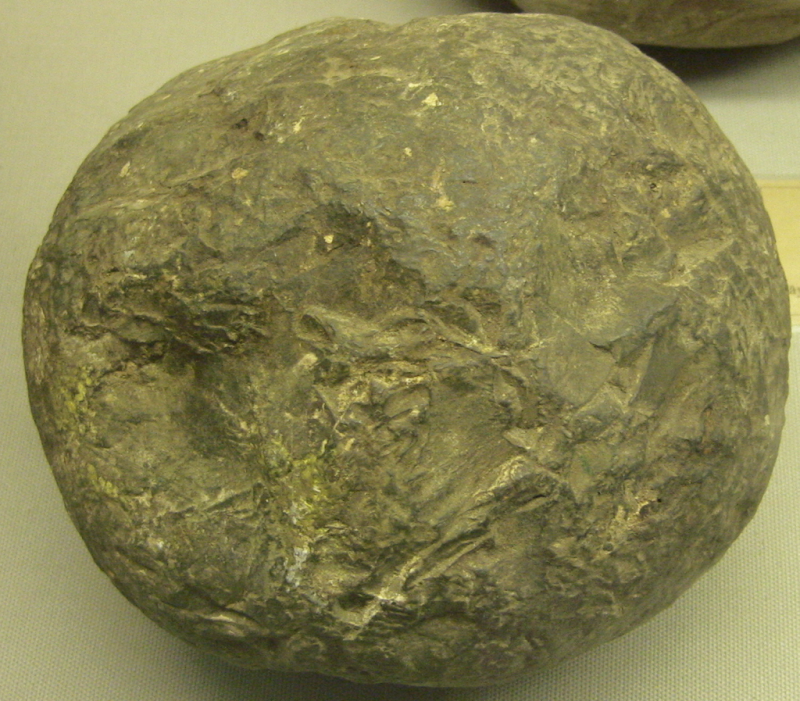
Stone projectile for catapult

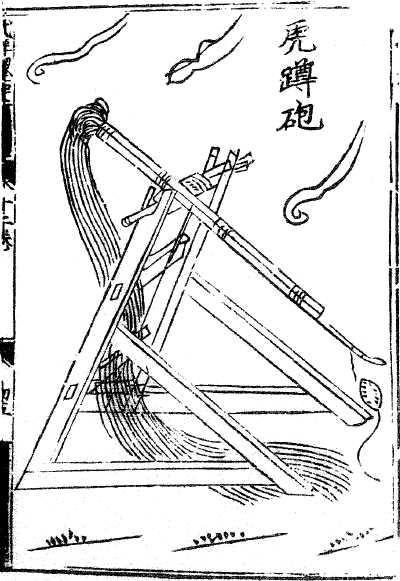
Illustration for Hu dun pao from Chinese book Wujing Zongyao

=== 1427–1789 ===
==== Navy ====
- Mong Dong
- Junk

==== Firearm ====
- Hand cannon
- Cannons
- Musket (at least since 1516)
- Flamethrower

==== Gallery ====
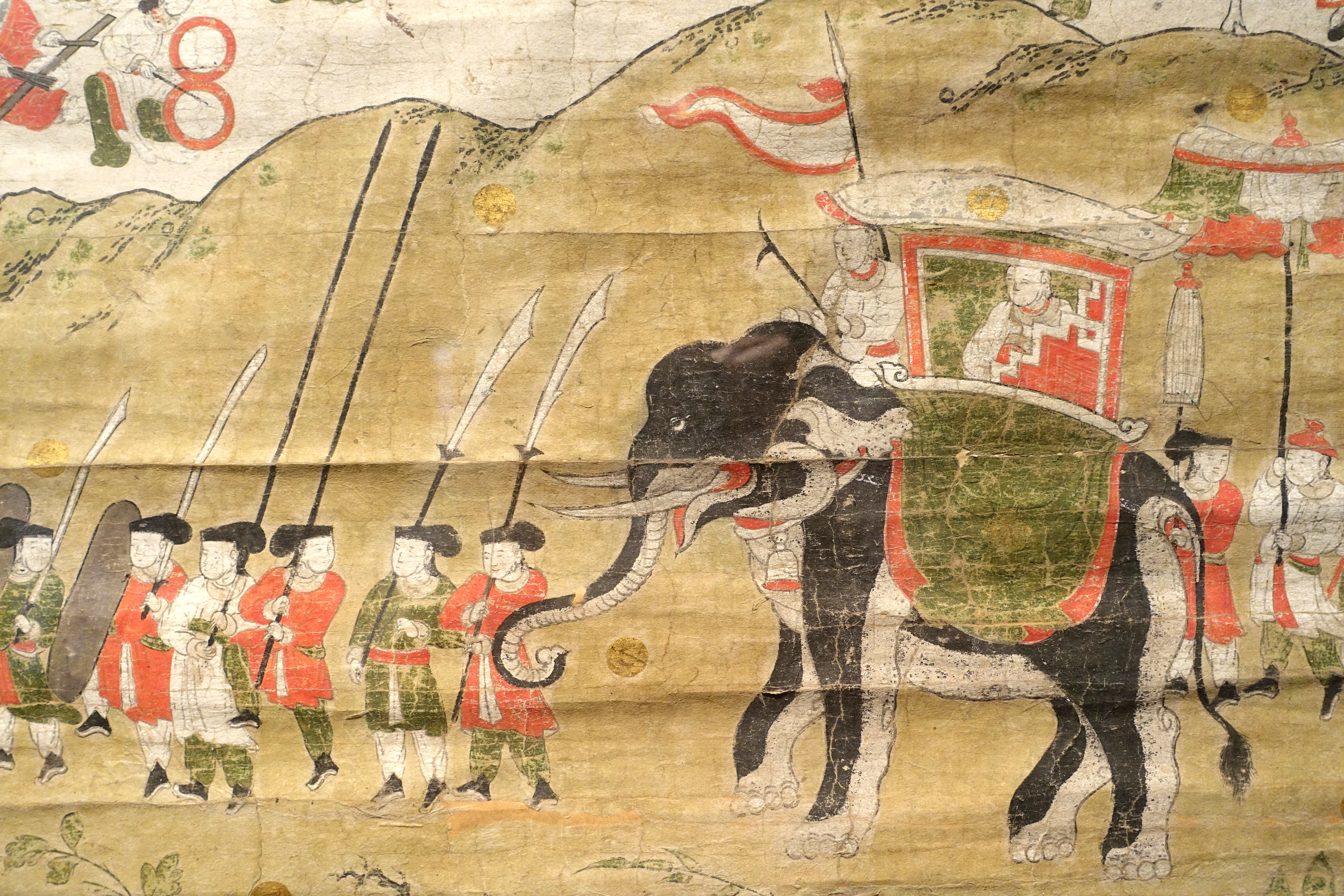
War elephant and soldiers

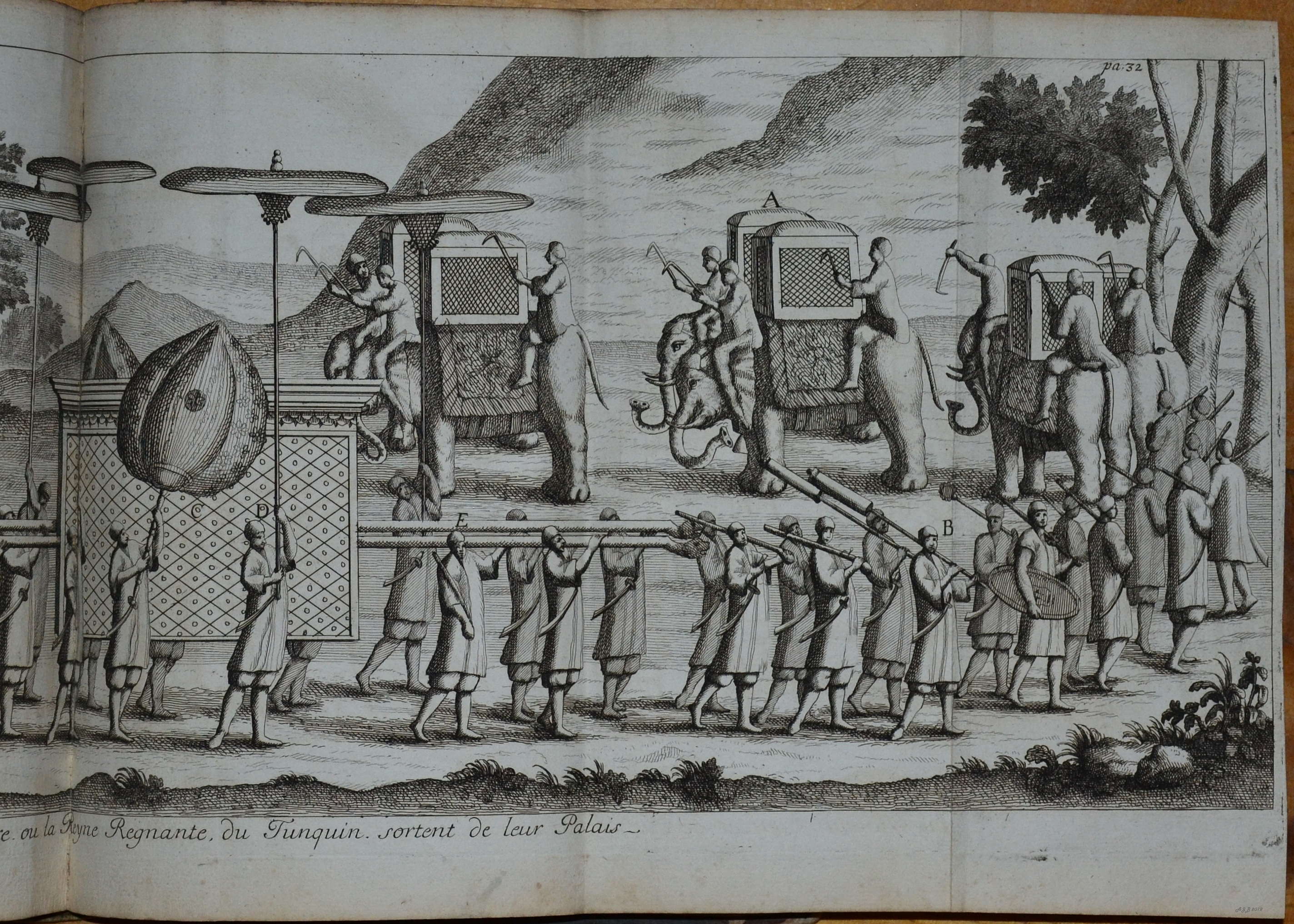
War elephants and soldiers carrying muskets

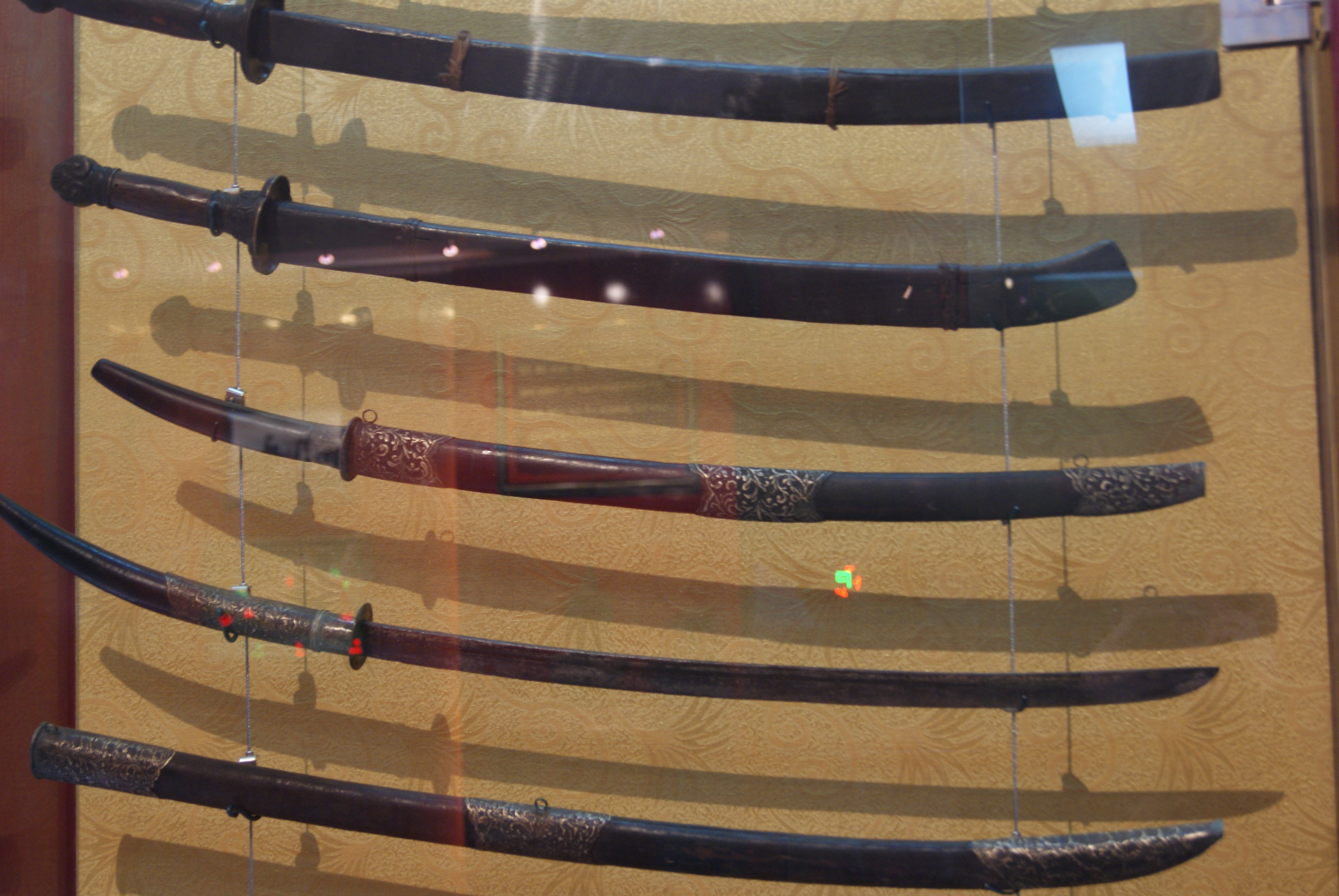
15-18th centuries sabers

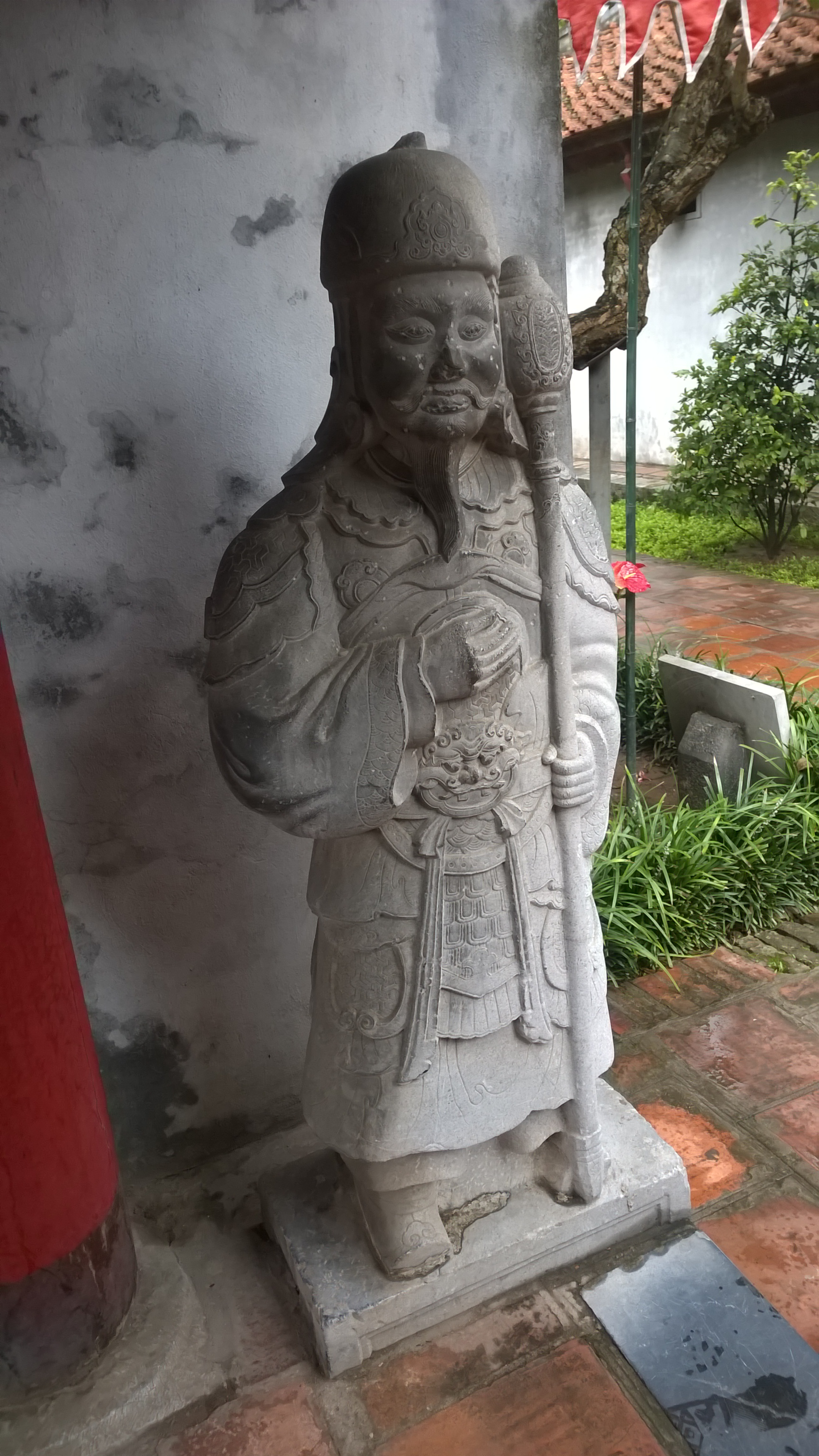
Armored soldier statue in Van Mieu

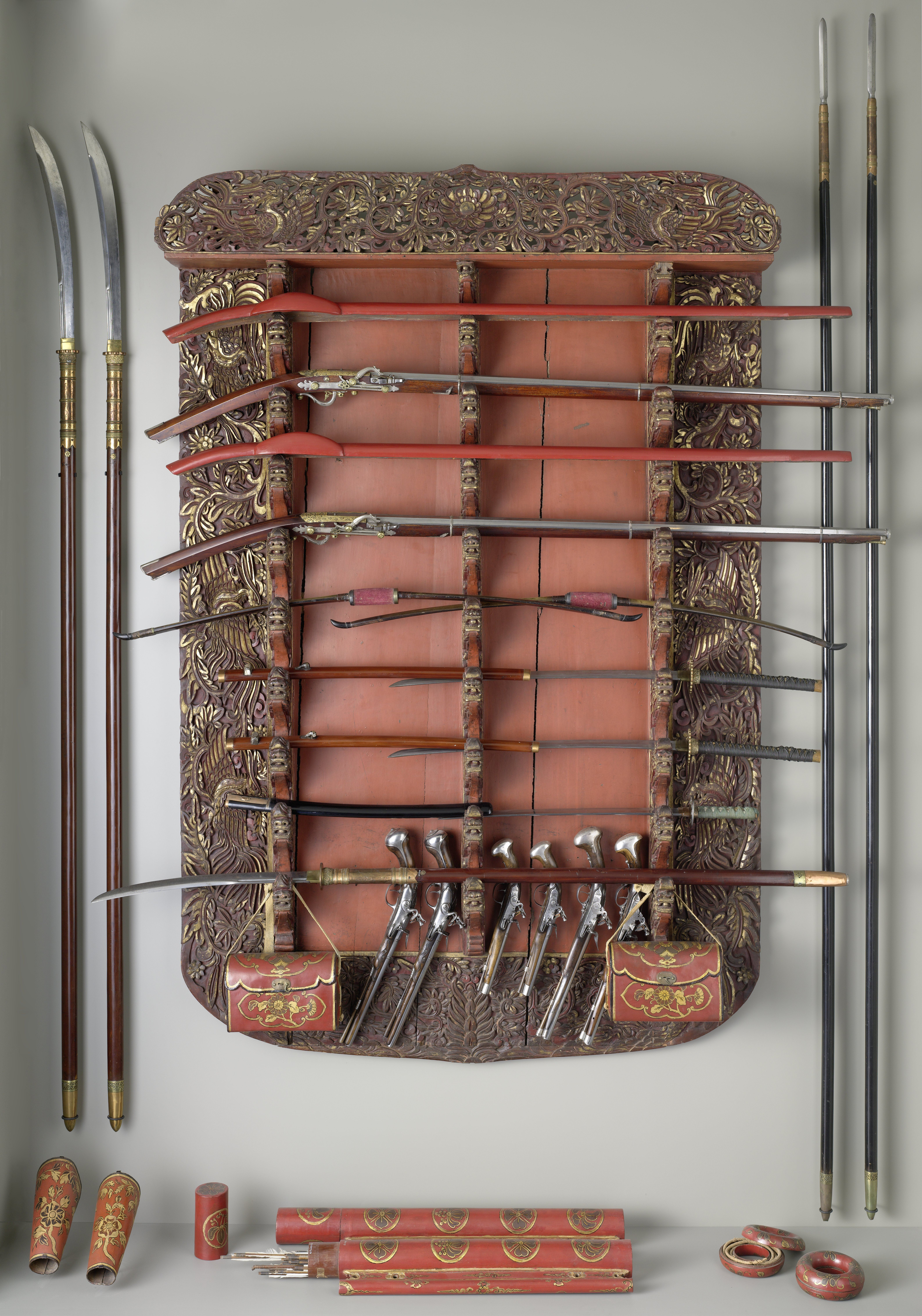
Vietnamese matchlocks circa 1650-1679

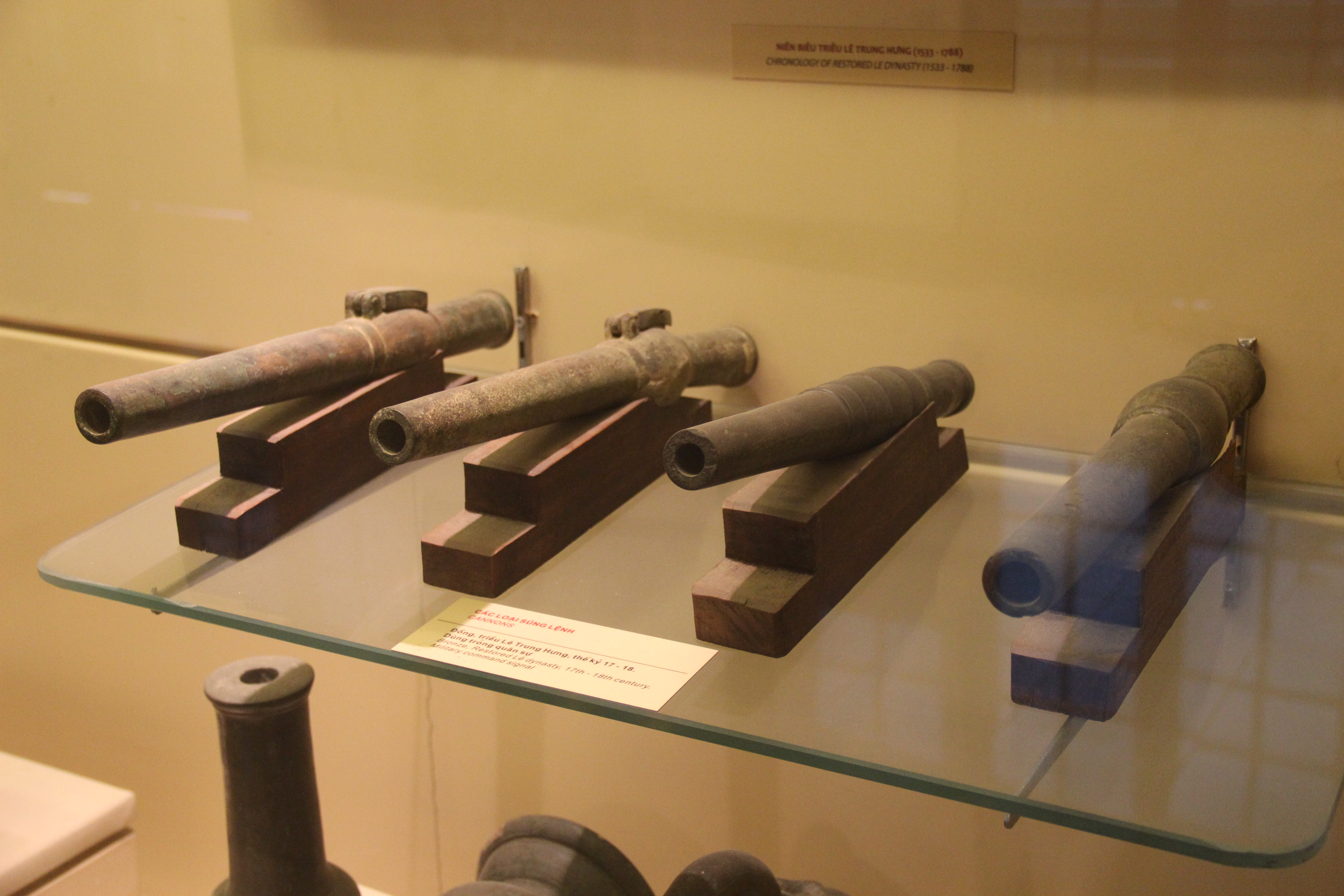
Vietnamese handguns circa 15-17th centuries

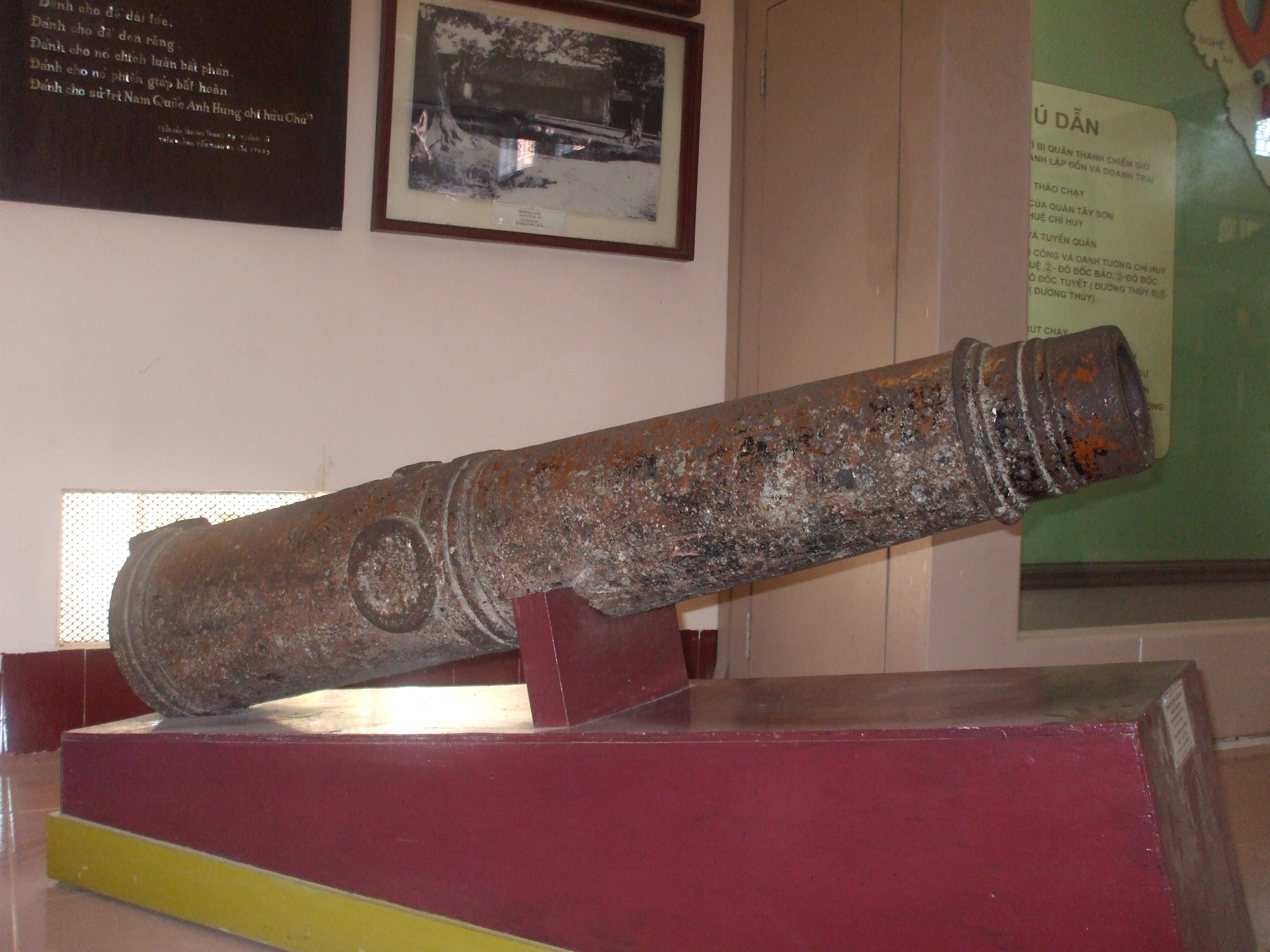
18th century cannon

== See also ==
- Military history of Vietnam
