= Toghon (son of Kublai) =

- Prince of Zhennan (鎮南王)

Prince of Zhennan
- Reign: 1284–1301
- Successor: Laozhang
- Born: ?
- Died: 1301; Yangzhou
- Concubine: An Tư
- Issue: See § Family
Names
- Toghon (ᠲᠣᠭᠣᠨ)
- Father: Kublai Khan
- Mother: Empress Bayaujin

Toghon (Note: also Toghan, Togon, Togan, or Tūqān; Chinese: 脫歡, Mongolian: Тогоон, Vietnamese: Thoát Hoan, Persian: توقان) (died 1301) was the ninth son of Kublai Khan, founder of the Yuan dynasty. He was a commander of the Mongol forces in the Mongol invasions of Vietnam.

== Biography ==
He was granted the title Prince of Zhennan (鎮南王, Mongolian: Жэнь Нань ван, Vietnamese: Trấn Nam vương "Prince of Suppressing the South") and moved his household to Ezhou in 1284.

In 1285, he led the Mongol armies sent to conquer Champa. He demanded from Đại Việt (now modern Vietnam) a route to Champa, which would trap the Champan army from both north and south, but it was rejected by retired emperor Trần Thánh Tông, who was the de facto ruler of Đại Việt. As a result, Toghon led an invasion of Đại Việt under orders from Kublai Khan. At first he won several victories and captured Thăng Long, the capital of Đại Việt. Trần Thánh Tông had to offer princess An Tư to him to slow down the pace of the Mongol army. Later he ordered a withdrawal back to China, blaming the weather and disease in Đại Việt. His forces were attacked and defeated by Trần Hưng Đạo during their retreat.

In 1287, he invaded Vietnam again. The Mongol navy was overwhelmed by Trần dynasty in Bạch Đằng river, and he retreated. This ashamed his father who no longer wished to see him again. He moved to Yangzhou in 1291, where he died 10 years later.

== Family ==
- Father: Kublai Khan
- Mother: Empress Bayaujin
- Wife: Unknown
- Concubine: An Tư from Annam
- Sons:
  - Laozhang, Prince of Zhennan (鎮南王 老章; Луужан)
  - Togh Bukha, Prince of Zhennan (鎮南王 脫不花, Тобуха)
  - Könček Bukha, Prince of Weishun (威順王 寬徹普化; Хонжибуха)
  - Temür Bukha, Prince of Huai (淮王 帖木兒不花; Төмөрбуха)
  - Mangi, Prince of Wenji (文濟王 蠻子; Манзи)
  - Budaširi, Prince of Xuande (宣德王 不答失里; Будшир)
