= Sino-Vietnamese =

Sino-Vietnamese is often used to mean:

- Sino-Vietnamese vocabulary, the portion of the Vietnamese vocabulary of Chinese origin or using of morphemes of Chinese origin.

People of Chinese origin in Vietnam:

- Hoa people or "Overseas Chinese"
- Ngái people, rural-dwelling Hakka Chinese people, counted separately from the Hoa people
- San Diu people or "Mountain Yao"/"Mountain Chinese ", Yao people who speak an archaic dialect of Cantonese as well as Iu Mien

People of Vietnamese origin in China:

- Gin people, one of the 55 officially recognised ethnic minorities of China, whose native language is Vietnamese
- Vietnamese people in Hong Kong

Conflicts:

- Sino-Vietnamese War of 1979
- Sino-Vietnamese Wars (disambiguation)
