= Battle of Bạch Đằng (1288) =

Vietnamese victory against Mongol invasion

- Part of the Mongol invasions of Vietnam
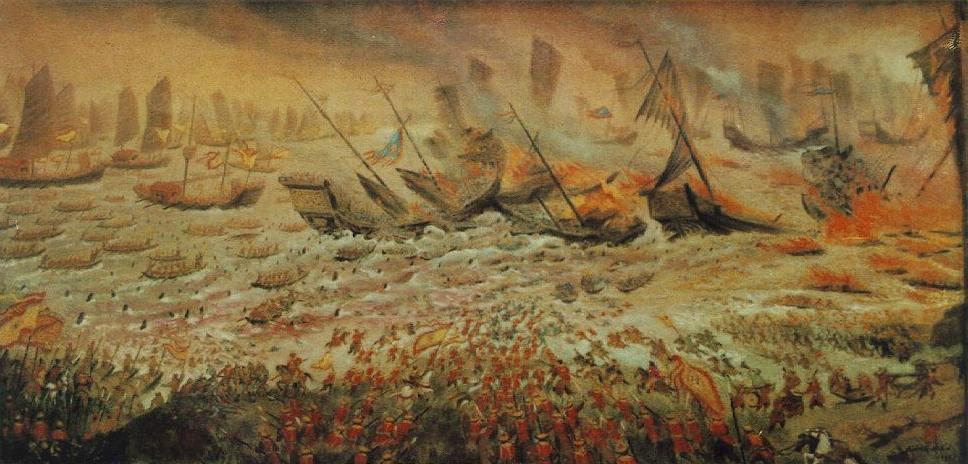
- Battle of Bạch Đằng, 1288
Date	9 April 1288
Location	Bạch Đằng River, Quảng Ninh; 20.937°N 106.629°E
Result	Đại Việt victory

Belligerents
Đại Việt	Yuan dynasty

Commanders and leaders
Trần Hưng Đạo; Trần Khánh Dư	Omar (POW); Fan Yi (executed)

Strength
Vietnamese Sources: 50,000	94,000; 500 ships

Casualties and losses
4,000–4,500 killed	80,000 killed or captured 500 ships sunk or captured

The Battle of Bạch Đằng was a decisive naval battle during the third Mongol invasion of Vietnam between Đại Việt commanded by Commander-in-Chief Prince Trần Quốc Tuấn (Prince Hưng Đạo), and the fleet of the Yuan dynasty, commanded by Admirals Omar and Fan Yi on the Bạch Đằng River (today Quảng Ninh province), which Prince Hưng Đạo staged an ambush that destroyed the Yuan fleet, capturing its general, ending Kublai’s intention to conquer Dai Viet and Champa. The battle was a tactical masterpiece of the same stature as a previous battle of Bạch Đằng that occurred in 938 and is considered as one of the greatest victories in Vietnamese military history.

== Background ==
Omar bin Nars al-Din 'Umar al-Bukhari, son of Mongol appointed Khwarezmian governor of Yunnan Nasr al-Din, was a highly reputed and skillful naval commander of the Mongol Yuan army during Kublai's conquest of the Song dynasty, in which he commanded the leading fleet to assist Zhang Hongfan's fleet pursuing the Song fleet from Guanzhou to Guangzhou in 1278, and repulsed a Song counterattack on Guangzhou in July. In March 1284 he and Qutuq (Mongol commander in a battle against the Burmese in 1277) had been accompanied to lead some 20,000 troops to join Sogetu against Champa, but he eventually went north to assist prince Toghon in the Yuan invasion of Dai Viet in early 1285, where he and the Tangut prince Li Heng used captured warships and drove the Vietnamese king Tran Nhan Tong to the sea in March. In April, Omar's fleet again battled the king of Dai Viet and prince Trần Quốc Tuấn's (uncle of reigning king Nhan Tong) fleet in the coast of Haiphong, nearly succeeded in capturing the king. However, as the Yuan forces were about to be disassembled due to running low on food supplies, Toghon ordered a retreat in June. Yuan forces, getting panicked while en route of retreat, and Toghon failed to inform Sogetu and Omar to withdraw. Sogetu was killed in battle soon after while Omar and his companion Liu Gui were successfully escaping to the beach, found a small boat, and sailed back to China.

In the third invasion in late 1287, some 100,000–170,000 Yuan soldiers were divided into two armies: land forces commanded by prince Toqon, and Omar was put in charge of commanding the naval forces along with Fan Yi and Mahmud, consisting of 18,000 soldiers, tens of thousand sailors, 70 transports, and 500 warships. From Qinzhou on 17 December, they sailed to Van Kiep through the Bach Dang River (the second most important distributary of the Red River), where they would meet and regroup with Toghon's forces there in January 1288. They assaulted, drove the king to the sea, and captured the Viet capital Thang Long (Hanoi) on 3 February, but found no grain left to resupply. Toghon then ordered his generals to sweep the Red River Delta, pillaging crops and gathering rice. The Yuan army was large, unsustainable, and was waiting for the supply fleet, commanded by Zhang Wenhu, slowly sailing toward Dai Viet. But unbeknownst to Toghon, in late January, prince Hưng Đạo and Prince Trần Khánh Dư with 30 warships, awaiting Zhang's fleet on the Van Don isle, and when the supply fleet passed by, the Vietnamese attacked, inflicted substantial amounts of damage on Zhang's supply fleet, and forced him to turn back to Hainan Island. Other Zhang's supply ships were blown off or drifted away by strong northeast monsoon winds. When the king of Dai Viet heard the news, he said: What the Yuan forces need most of all is food. They may not have heard of the defeat of their transport fleet and maybe planning further offensive action." With logistic superiors were stripped away, the large Yuan army now stranded and began starving. On 5 March Toghon left Hanoi back to the Yuan base of Van Kiep, and 25 days later he decided to withdraw the army back to China, as food supplies ran low and the situation worsened. Prince Toghon withdrew by land, and then boarded a large warship for himself.

Hearing the news, Prince Hưng Đạo was now about to launch a counterattack. The Vietnamese had destroyed bridges, roads and created traps along the retreating Yuan route. They were pursuing Toghon's forces to Lạng Sơn, where Toghon was forced to abandon his ship and was escorted to the China border by his few remaining troops through the forests. Most of Toghon's land force were killed or captured. Meanwhile, the Yuan fleet commanded by Omar and Fan Yi retreated through the Bạch Đằng river, the same route previously where they entered Dai Viet.

== Plan ==
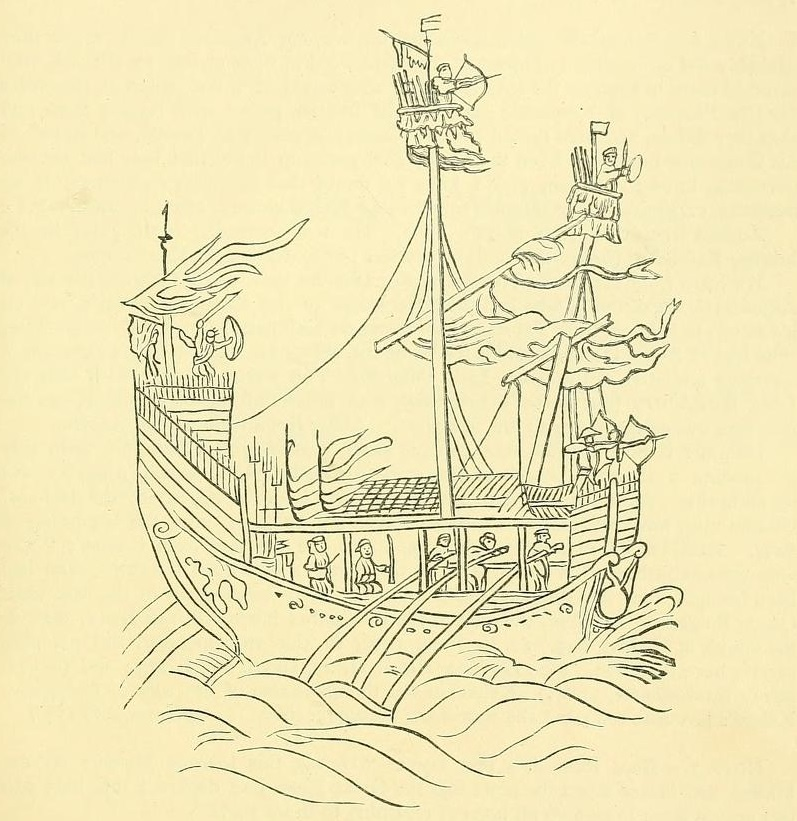
Chinese warship, probably deployed by the Yuan

The Bạch Đằng River ran through Yen Hung district (in Quảng Ninh province) and Thuy Nguyen (in Hai Phong) before reaching the sea. This was where the earlier well-known battle of Ngô Quyền against the Southern Han had taken place in 938. Beginning from March, Trần Hưng Đạo began preparing the battlefield. He used the same tactic that Ngô Quyền had against the Chinese in 938. He studied the tidal lore, and ordered beds of stakes to be planted under the water and arranged ambushes in a unified plan of campaign.

Trần Hưng Đạo ordered his soldiers to nail the iron-headed poles under the waters of the Chanh, Kênh and Rút rivers. All three rivers are the northern distributaries of the Bach Dang River. Ghềnh Cốc is a reef located across the Bach Dang to the bottom of Chanh river and to the top of Kênh river. Ghềnh Cốc was used as a place for the ambush, in collaboration with the underwater iron-headed poles. They were to block the enemy ships when the tide withdrew. Đại Việt's small flotilla secretly stationed themselves behind Ghềnh Cốc, Ðồng Cốc, Phong Cốc and on the Khoái, Thái, Gia Ðước, and Ðiền Công rivers. The army deployed in Hung Yen, along the left bank of the river Bach Dang and Tràng Kênh, at the right bank of Bach Dang River and Mount Ðá Vôi.

== Battle ==
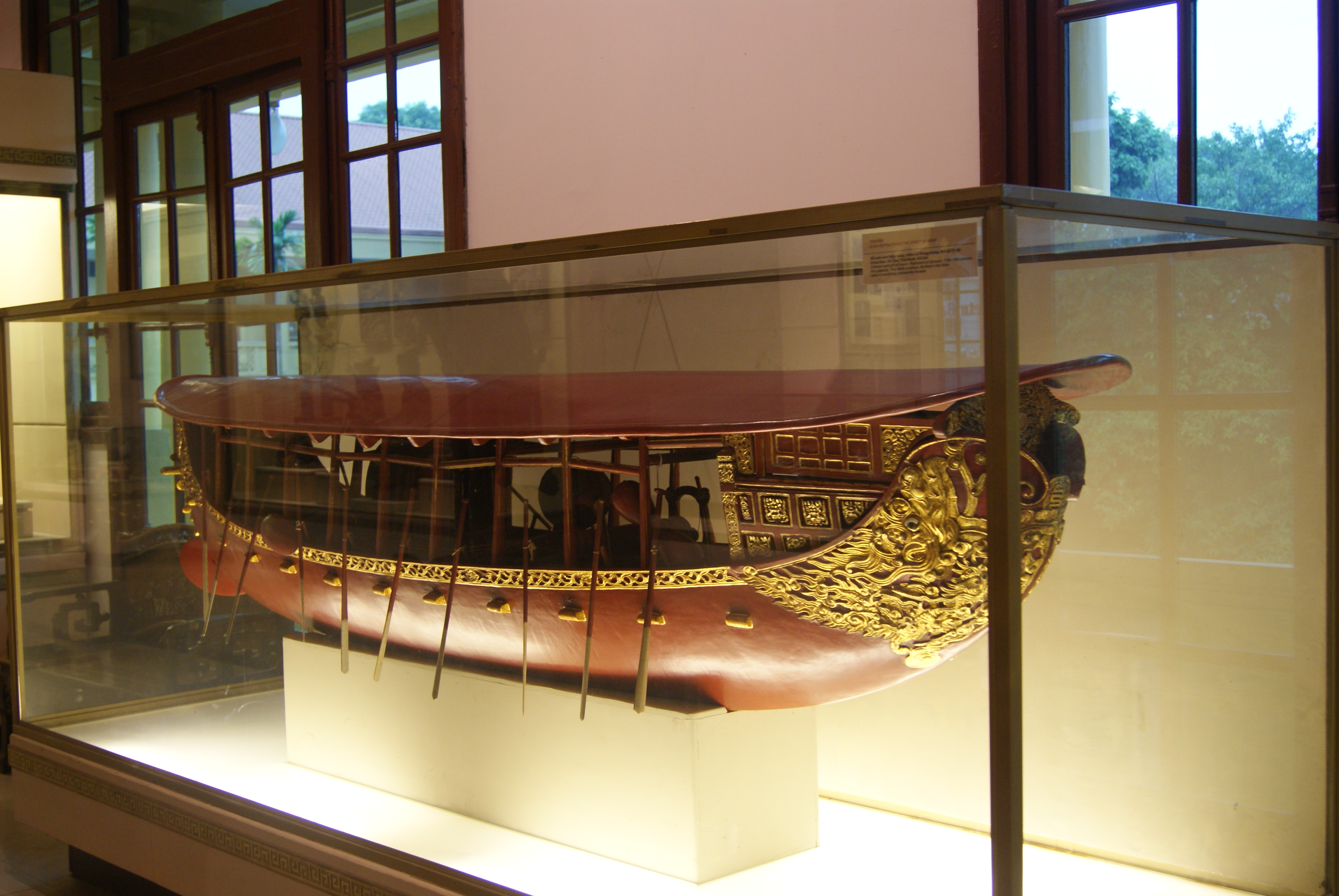
17th-century model of a Vietnamese mông đồng fighting boat, a type which probably had constituted much of the Vietnamese naval fleet 400 years earlier

In the early morning of 9 April, the naval fleet led by Omar, and escorted by infantry, fled home along the Bạch Đằng river. They entered Hưng Đạo's trap when it was high tide. A small fleet of Vietnamese junks sailed unopposed and attacked the Yuan fleet, then retreated. Then the tide receded, with the Yuan fleet pursuing and battling the Vietnamese junks, revealing wooden stakes that had been planted into the river bed. With the Yuan fleet stuck in the trap, the Vietnamese junks returned and destroyed the immobilized Yuan warships. Thousands of Yuan troops jumped into the river and were killed or drowned. Fan Yi, seeing Omar's fleet being destroyed, and his commanding fleet surrounded by Vietnamese small junks, tried to escape. Fan Yi jumped into the river, but was killed by the Vietnamese. The battle lasted from sunrise to sundown and the Vietnamese captured 400 Yuan warships.

The Yuan fleet was totally destroyed, and Omar was captured by the Vietnamese.

== Aftermath ==
Upon receiving news of the Mongol defeat, Kublai angrily banished Toghon to Yangzhou for life. The Mongols and the Vietnamese agreed to exchange their war prisoners. While King Trần Nhân Tông was willing to pay tribute to the Yuan, relations again foundered on the question of attendance at the Yuan court and hostile relations continued. In 1289, King Nhân Tông agreed to send back his prisoner Omar, but Prince Hưng Đạo, who opposed this gesture, contrived to have the ship transporting Omar back to sink at sea.

King Trần Nhân Tông eventually decided to accept the supremacy of the Yuan dynasty in order to avoid further conflicts. Because he refused to come in person, Kublai detained his envoy, Đào Từ Kí, in 1293. Kublai's successor Temür Khan (r. 1294–1307), finally released all detained envoys, settling instead for a nominate tributary relationship, which continued until the end of the Yuan dynasty.

Upon the victory of the Vietnamese, a series of celebrations broke out over the news. The Mongols' failure brought surrounding minor Asian states more confidence on their own wars against the Mongols. The Mongols' defeat also crushed the Mongols' ambitions to conquer all of Southeast Asia. It was known as one of Vietnam's greatest victories in its military history.

== Legacy ==
The battle is well recited in Vietnamese tradition and literature. The Emperor Trần Minh Tông (1300-1357) wrote the poem Bạch Đằng River while visiting the site of the battle.

白藤江... 山河今古雙開眼， 胡越贏輸一倚欄。 江水渟涵斜日影， 錯疑戰血未曾乾。	Bạch Đằng River... This nation had its eyes opened twice, The contention between Hu and Viet was all but for a moment. The river carries the sunset reddish hue, It feels like the battlefield's blood still hasn't been dried.

The Trần dynasty mandarin and scholar Phạm Sư Mạnh (1300-1384) also wrote a poem depicting the battle:

行役簦家山 行役簦家山， 僑首萬里天。... 洶洶白藤濤， 想象吳王船。 憶昔重興帝， 刻轉坤斡榦。 海浦千艨艟， 陜門萬旌旃。... 至今四海民， 長說擒胡年。	Hành Dịch Đăng Gia Sơn (Visiting my home mountain while travelling) Travelling for work, I visited my home mountain. Raising one's head, a thousand mile sightline.... The Bach Dang's gushing tides, Revealing King Ngô's fleet. and Emperor Trùng Hưng's feat, In a heaven-shattering moment. Thousands of Mông Đồng galleys, Their flags enshrouded the river strait.... Until this day, from all corners of our realm, People still recount, the year when we held off the Hu Barbarians.

The Lê dynasty scholar Nguyễn Trãi (1380-1442) also wrote the poem Bạch Đằng hải khẩu (白藤海口) while visiting the place.

Bạch Đằng River was also the name of a patriotic song written by Lưu Hữu Phước during the 1940s.

== Sources ==
- Karnow, Stanley (1983), Vietnam: A History, New York: Penguin Books, ISBN 0-14-007324-8
- Elleman, Bruce A. (2012), China as a Sea Power, 1127-1368: A Preliminary Survey of the Maritime Expansion and Naval Exploits of the Chinese People During the Southern Song and Yuan Periods, U.S. Naval War College: NUS Press, ISBN 9789971695057
