= Advantage of terrain =

Land combat consideration

An advantage of terrain occurs when military personnel gain an advantage over an enemy by using or simply in spite of, the terrain around them. The term does not exclusively apply to battles and can be used more generally regarding entire campaigns or theaters of war.

Mountains, for example, can block off certain areas and make it unnecessary to station troops within the inaccessible area. That deployment strategy can be applied with other formidable environmental features as well, such as forests and mountains. In the former instance, dense vegetation can provide concealment for tactical movements such as setting up an ambush. In the latter, the elevation can provide an advantage to soldiers using projectile weapons, such as arrows or artillery pieces. Elevation itself is perhaps the most well-known example of terrain advantage, with gravity working to the advantage of the more elevated party.

Securing a terrain advantage is an important consideration for modern commanders, particularly those engaged in unconventional tactics such as guerrilla warfare, but it was likely of even greater concern for pre-industrial forces since the lack of mobility during first-generation warfare left soldiers very vulnerable to its effects. The ancient military strategist Sun-Tzu, for example, dedicated an entire chapter in his treatise The Art of War to terrain and situational positioning.

== Examples ==
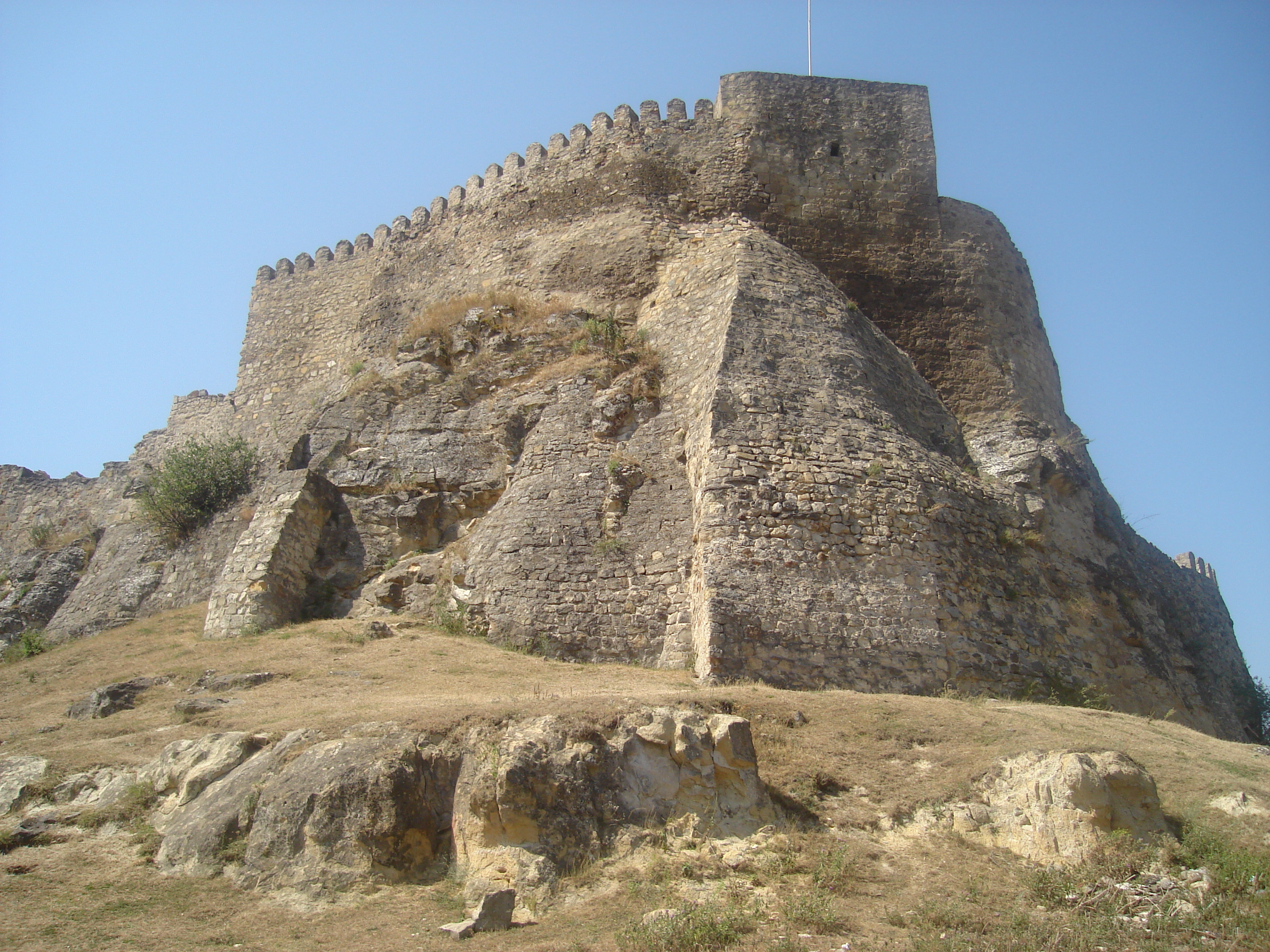
Many ancient fortifications took advantage of local terrain, such as this fortress in Surami, Georgia.

- The Battle of Agincourt had nearby trees create a choke point at which the French were hit by English long bowmen. The main environmental factor in English victory was the extremely muddy area. The field had recently been plowed, and it had been raining recently.
- The Alps have long been used to protect northern Italy. Few people have tried crossing the Alps in a military invasion, with some notable exceptions (Hannibal and Napoleon Bonaparte).
- The Battles of Morgarten (Swiss Confederation, 1315), Lake Trasimene (Roman Empire, 217 BC) and Teutoburg Forest (Roman Empire, 7 AD) forced the attacker to fight at a narrow place between a lake (or a swamp) and hills.
- During the American Revolutionary War, Peninsular War, Vietnam War, etc., militants relied on the terrain to combat forces that were superior in numbers or quality.

== See also ==
- Guerrilla warfare
- Military strategy
- Military tactics
