= Bạch Đằng River =

River in Vietnam

Coordinates: 20.8442°N 106.6317°E

Bạch Đằng River flow = 6 280 m/s
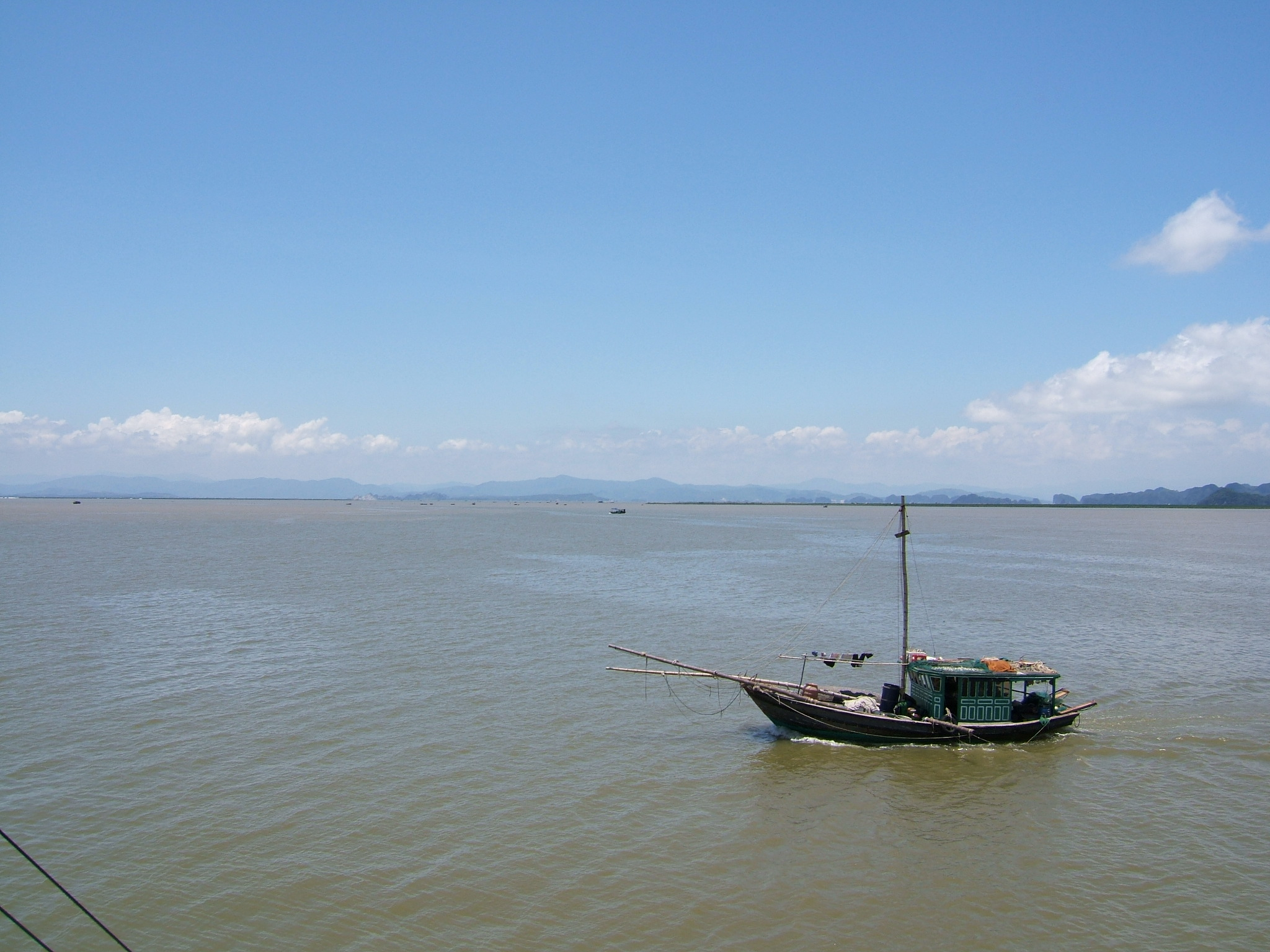
- Bạch Đằng River

Location
- Country: Vietnam

Physical characteristics
- Mouth: Nam Trieu Mouth
  - location: Vietnam
  - elevation: 0 m (0 ft)
- Length: 43 km (27 mi)

The Bạch Đằng River (Vietnamese: Sông Bạch Đằng, IPA: [ʂoŋ ɓâjk̟ ɗɐ̀ŋ]; also Bạch Đằng Giang, from 白藤江, IPA: [ɓâjk̟ ɗɐ̀ŋ ʑaːŋ], the White Wisteria River) is a river in northern Vietnam, located near Hạ Long Bay. It flows through Yên Hưng district of Quảng Ninh province and Thủy Nguyên district of Haiphong.

It serves as a means of accessing Hanoi from the Gulf of Tonkin, through the Nam Triệu Mouth, the Kinh Thầy River, the Đuống River, and then the Red River to Hanoi.

== Bạch Đằng River battles ==
The Bạch Đằng River has been the site of three important battles in Vietnamese history:

- Battle of 938 where Ngô Quyền defeated an attack by the Southern Han, resulting in Vietnamese independence.
- Battle of 981 where Lê Đại Hành defeated the Song dynasty.
- Battle of 1288, where general Trần Hưng Đạo employed the tactics used in 938 to drive out the Mongol invaders.

In each of these three battles, stakes in the Bạch Đằng river were used as defensive obstacles. The first time was in 938, as part of Ngô Quyền's battle strategy. Archaeologists discovered several of these ancient stakes.
