= Sino-Vietnamese Wars =

The Sino-Vietnamese War was a brief border war between China and Vietnam in early 1979.

Sino-Vietnamese War may also refer to:

- Qin campaign against the Yue tribes (221–214 BC)
- Han conquest of Nanyue (111 BC)
- Trung sisters' rebellion (40–43 AD)
- Lady Triệu Rebellion (248)
- Lý Nam Đế Rebellion (543)
- Sui–Former Lý War (602)
- Mai Thúc Loan Rebellion (713–723)
- Phùng Hưng Rebellion (791)
- Tĩnh Hải-Southern Han War (930)
- Dương Đình Nghệ Rebellion (931)
- 2nd Tĩnh Hải-Southern Han War (938)
- Song–Đại Cồ Việt war (981)
- Song–Đại Việt war (1075–1077)
- Mongol invasions of Vietnam (1257–1288)
- Ming conquest of Đại Ngu (1406–07)
- Later Trần revolt (1407–1413)
- Lam Sơn uprising (1418–1427)
- Qing invasion of Đại Việt (1789)
- Tonkin campaign (1883–1886)
- Vietnam War (1955–1975)
  - Battle of the Paracel Islands (1974)
- Sino-Vietnamese War (1979)
- Sino-Vietnamese conflicts (1979–1991)
  - Johnson South Reef skirmish (1988)

== See also ==
- China–Vietnam relations
- Sino-Vietnamese (disambiguation)
