= Mông đồng =

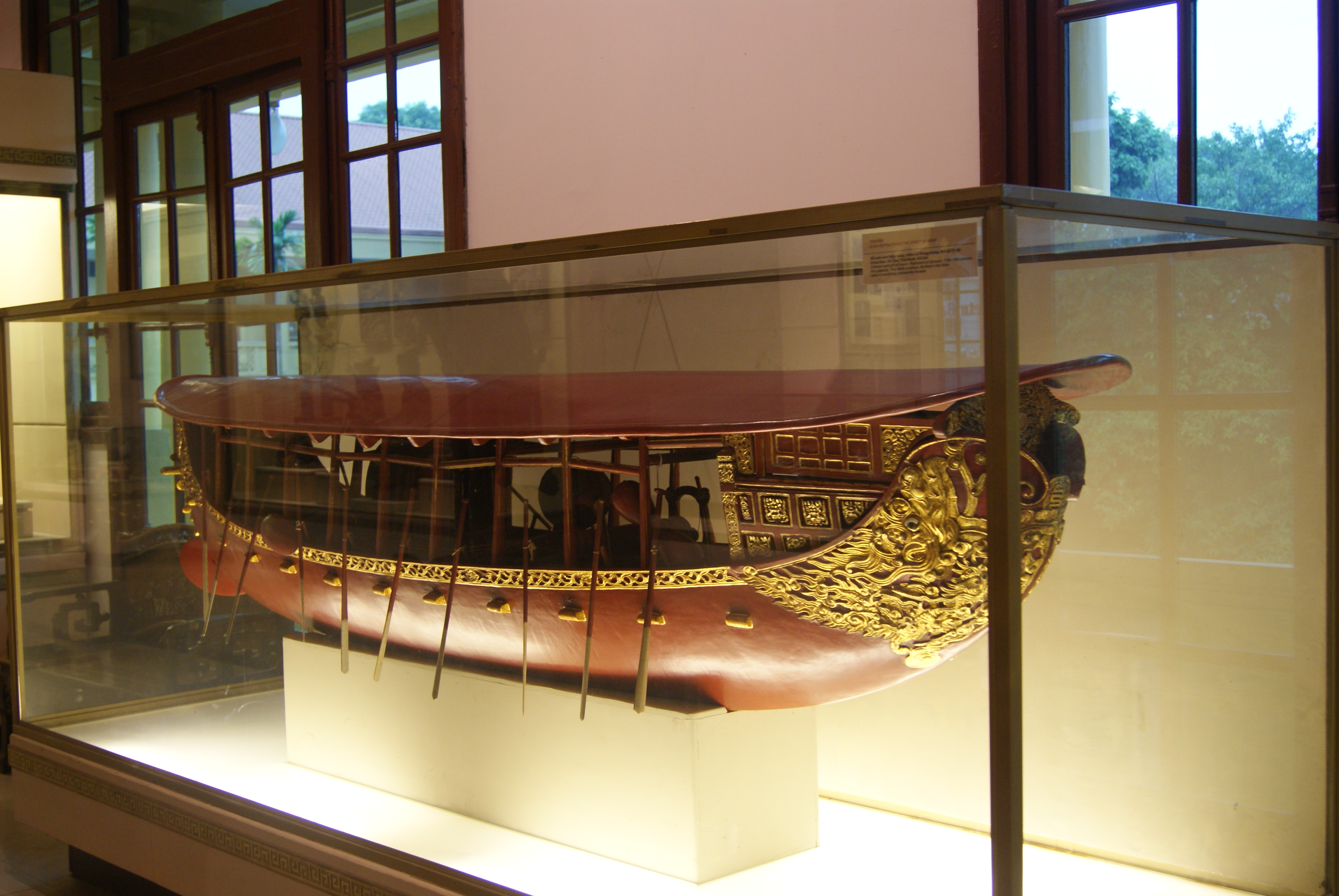
Lacquered and gilded wood model of a 17th-century mông đồng, Hanoi Museum of National History.

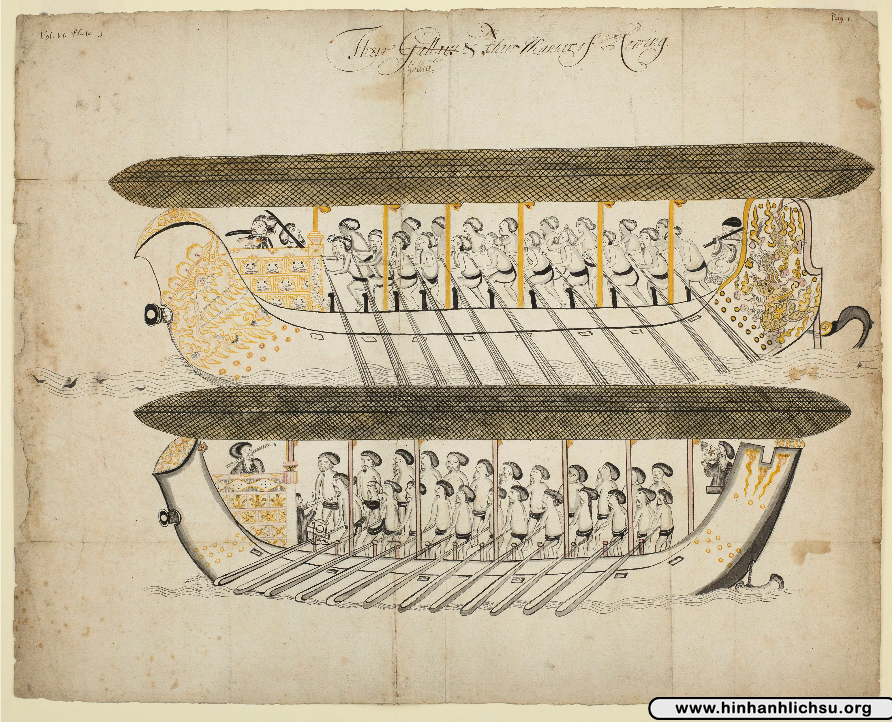
Painting of mông đồng of the Revival Lê dynasty (1684-1685)

Mông đồng (chữ Hán: 艨艟) is a class of near-shore warship and riverine boat that played a dominant role in medieval Vietnamese naval forces for over a thousand years.

The An Nam chí lược records that Tang dynasty governor Trương Châu ordered 300 Mông đồng built circa 1000. Each was manned by 23 oarsmen and capable of carrying 25 soldiers. They were fast, long and narrow and capable of ramming enemy vessels.

== Gallery ==
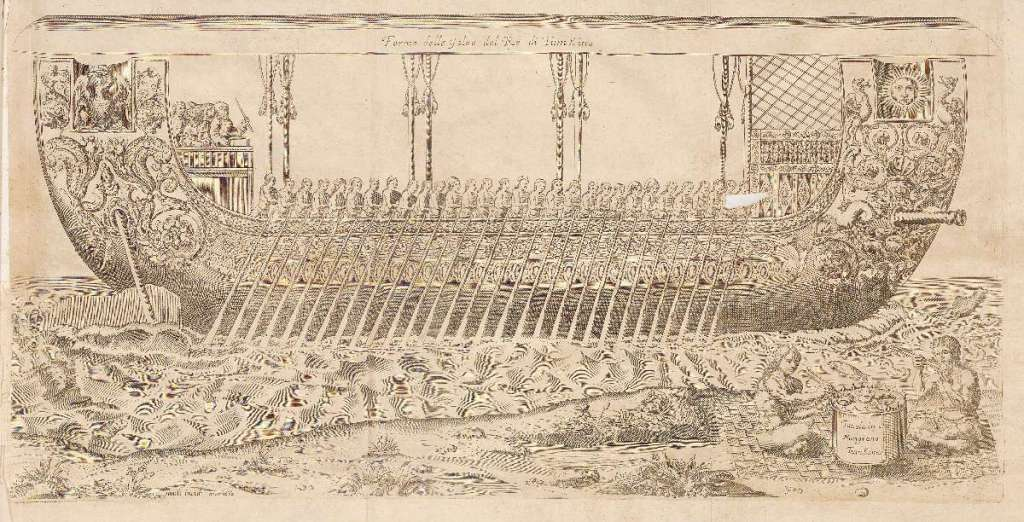
Mông đồng illustration

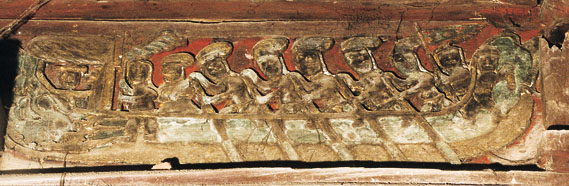
relief carving of a mông đồng boat, Hương Canh communal house, Vĩnh Phúc.

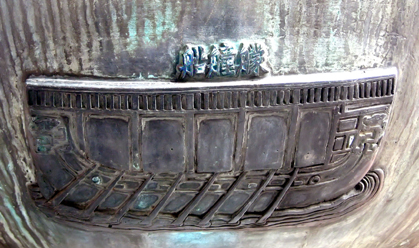
Carving on Chương Cauldron- 19th century Huế.

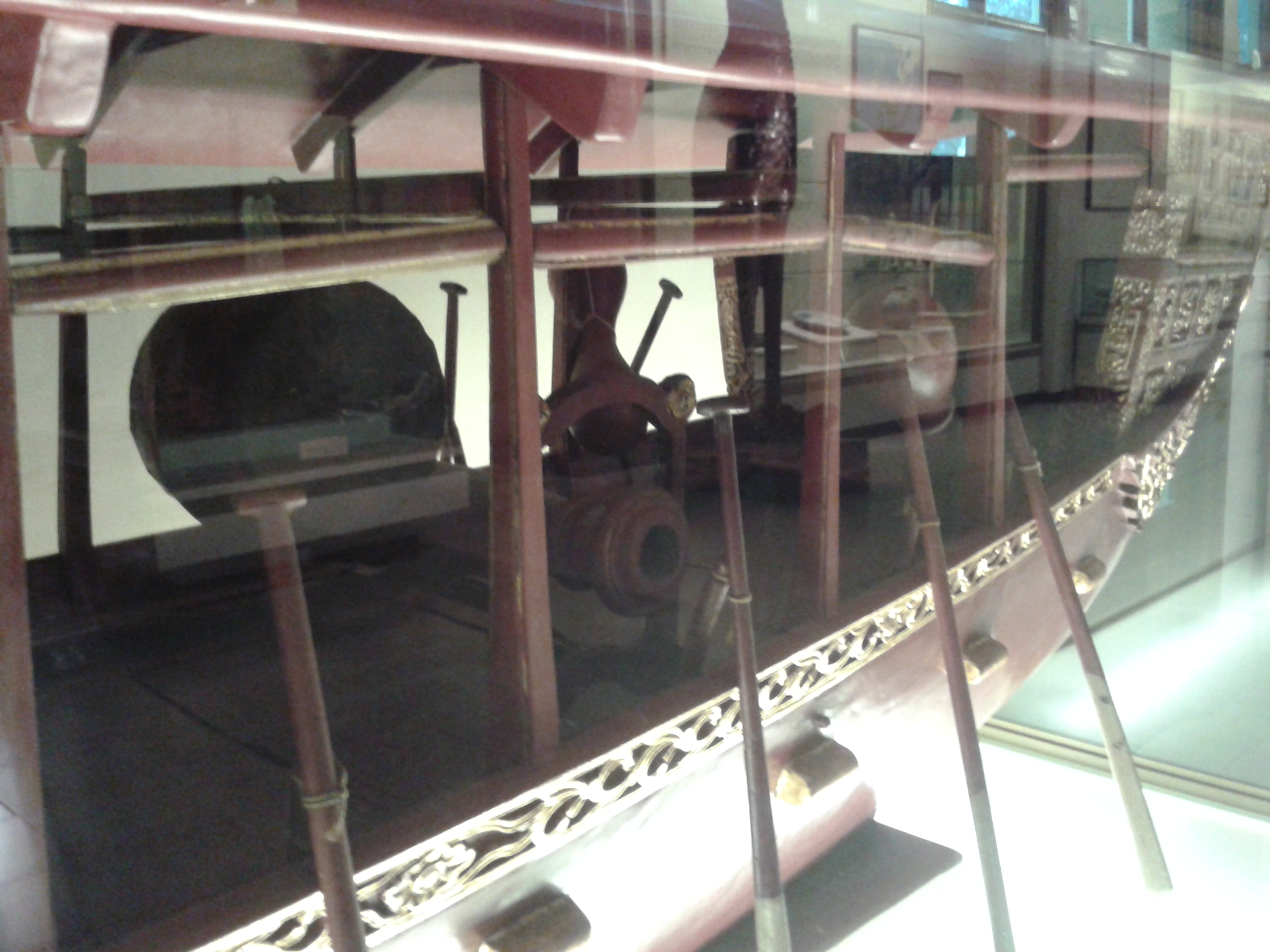
Close up on the bow of the miniature mông đồng at the Hanoi Museum of National History, originally the model was kept at Keo Temple, Thái Bình

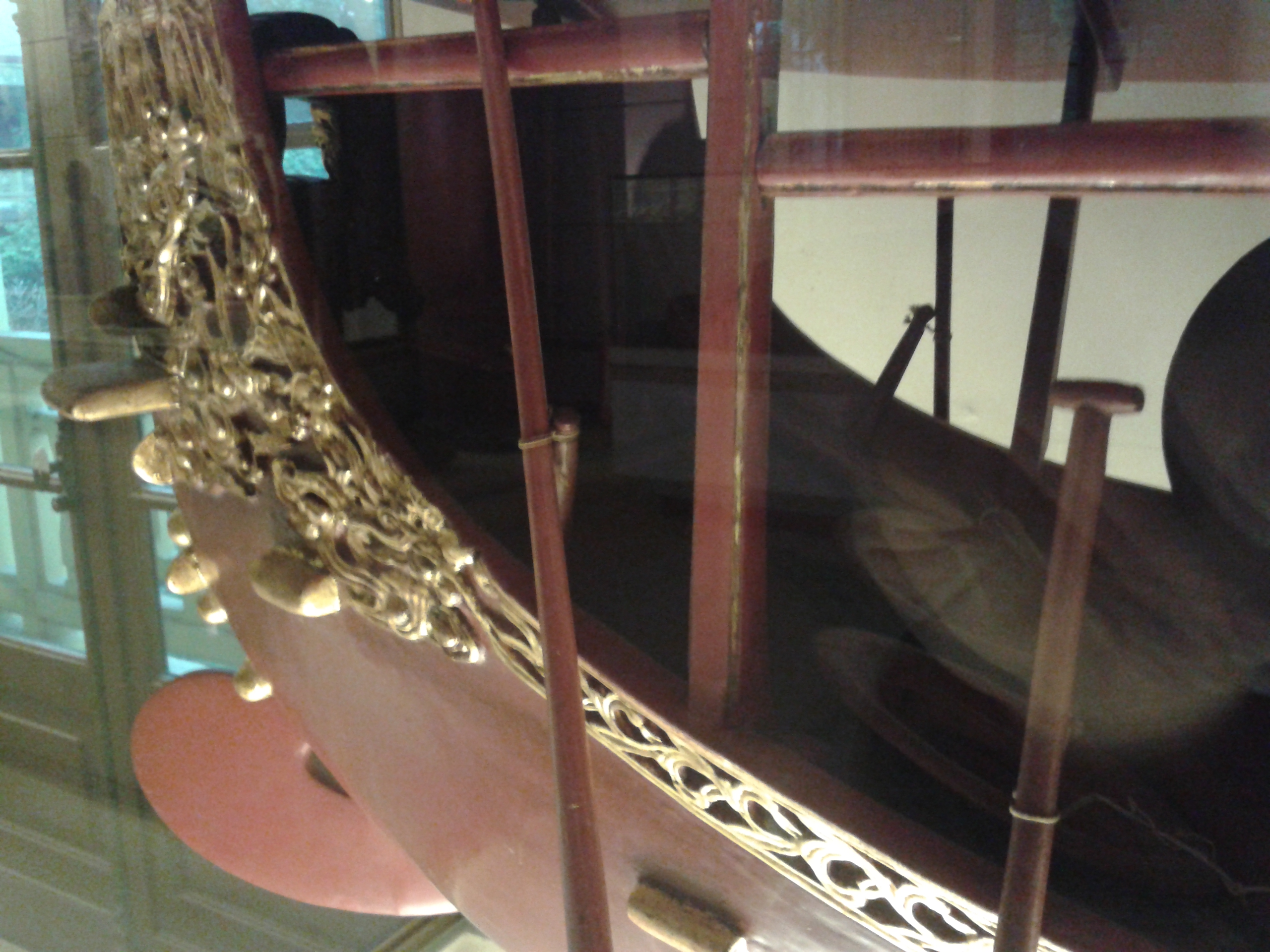
Close up on the stern of the miniature mông đồng at the Hanoi Museum of National History, originally the model was kept at Keo Temple, Thái Bình

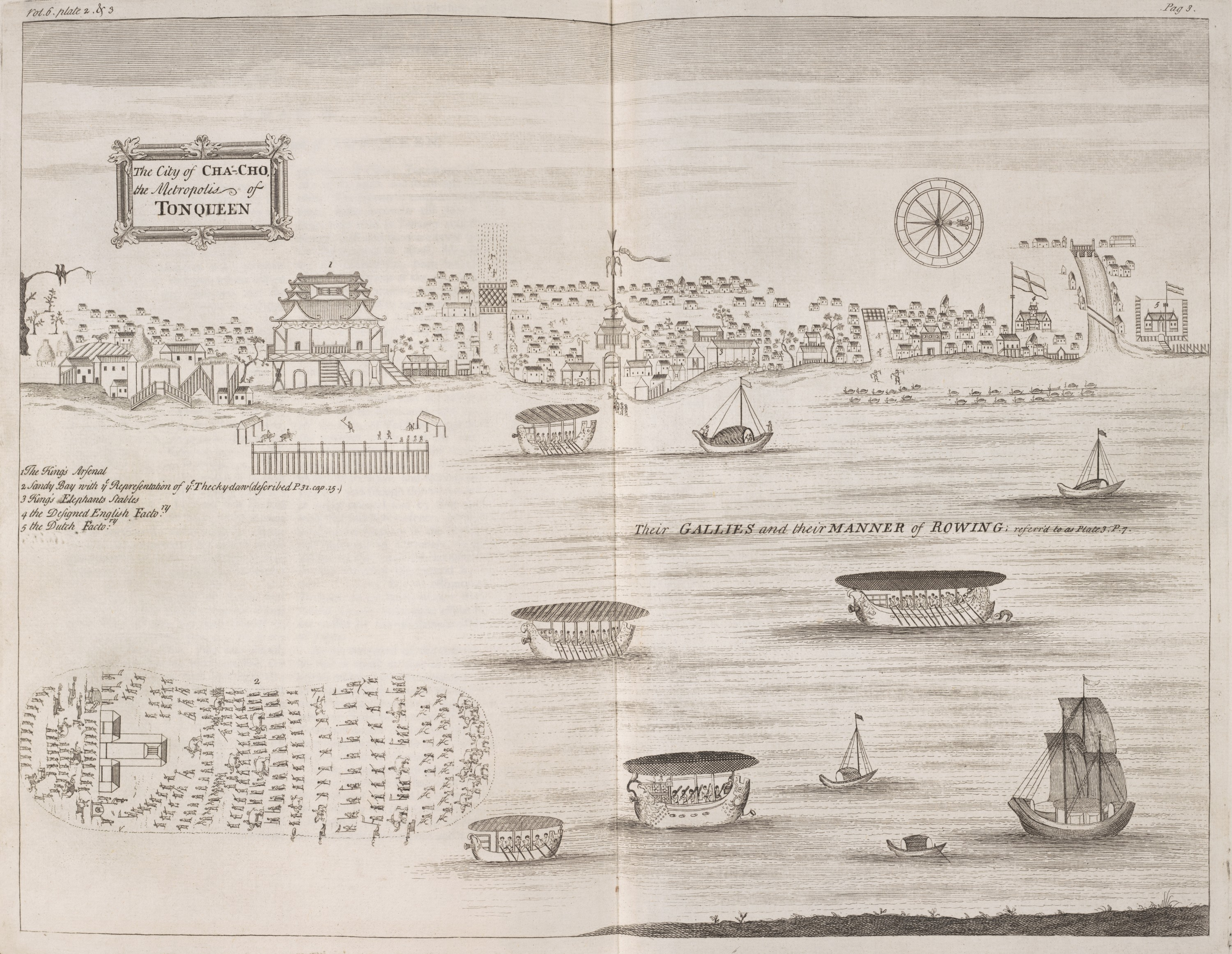
Mông đồng sailing on Red river in Đông Kinh (Hanoi) ,17th century.

== See also ==
- Mengchong
