= Le Tan =

Le Tan may refer to:

- Lê Tần (黎秦), a former name of the 13th century Vietnamese general Lê Phụ Trần
- Le Tan, a brand of sunscreen in Australia created by the founders of Chemist Warehouse
