= Trần Bình Trọng =

- Prince of Bảo Nghĩa
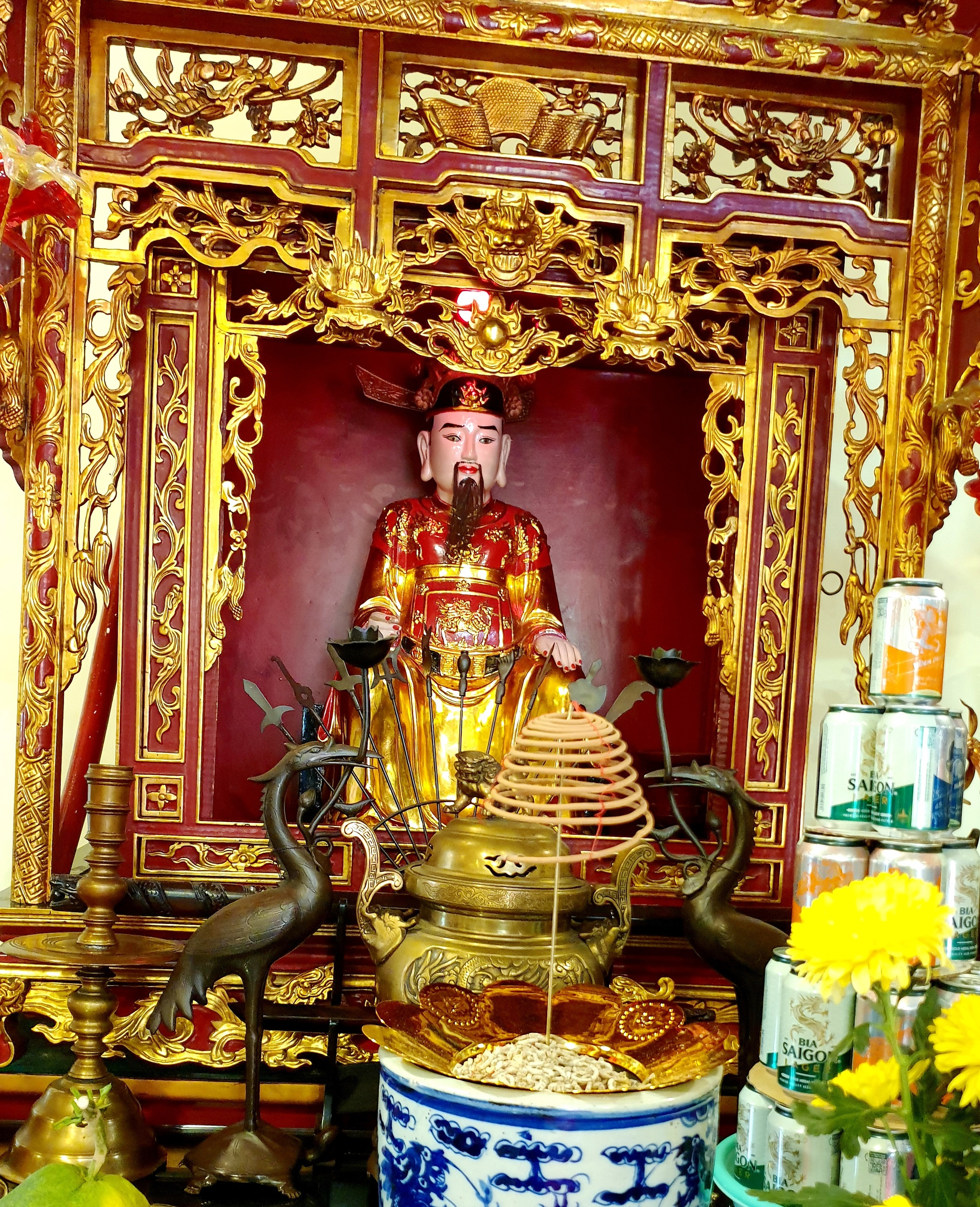
- Born: 1259; Thang Long, Đại Việt
- Died: 1285 (aged 25–26); Binh Than, Đại Việt
- Spouse: Princess Thụy Bảo
- House: Trần dynasty

Prince of Bảo Nghĩa Trần Bình Trọng (chữ Hán: 陳平仲; 1259–1285) was a general of the Trần dynasty well known for his heroic action in the war of Dai Viet against the second Mongol invasion. After the capture of Trần Bình Trọng by the army of the Yuan dynasty, Kublai Khan's prince Toghan attempted to convince the Đại Việt general to surrender by telling him about the situation of the Trần dynasty, saying that Trần Bình Trọng would get a minister's post in China. However, the general rejected his proposition, and thus, Toghan had him executed. Today, he is widely known as an example of patriotism in Vietnam. The story about Marquis Bảo Nghĩa is taught in Vietnamese textbooks and many places in Vietnam are named in honour of this national hero.

== History ==
According to Từ điển Bách khoa toàn thư Việt Nam, Marquis Bảo Nghĩa (Vietnamese: Bảo Nghĩa hầu) Trần Bình Trọng was born in 1259 during the reign of the Emperor Trần Thánh Tông. Trần Bình Trọng descended from a family which was origin from the Emperor Lê Đại Hành but married Princess Thụy Bảo of the Trần dynasty while his father and grandfather were officials under the Emperor Trần Thái Tông, therefore he was granted the royal family name Trần.

In 1279, the Yuan dynasty won a decisive victory over the Song dynasty at the Battle of Yamen which marked the end of the Song dynasty and resulted in the total control of Kublai Khan over China. As a result, Kublai Khan began to expose his attempt to take over the southern countries like Đại Việt or Champa. In December 1284, the second Yuan's invasion of Đại Việt was opened under the command of Kublai Khan's prince Toghan. Đại Việt was attacked in two directions, Toghan himselft conducted the infantry invaded from the northern border while Yuan's navy under general Sogetu advanced from the southern border through Champa's territory. In the beginning of the war, the Retired Emperor Thánh Tông and the Emperor Nhân Tông had to retreat from Thăng Long under the pressure of Yuan army. Grand commander of Đại Việt army Trần Hưng Đạo decided to appoint general Trần Bình Trọng to take charge of holding back the Yuan army so that two Emperors could retreat safely to Thiên Trường. In a battle near Đà Mạc (or Thiên Mạc) in February 1285, Trần Bình Trọng's troops were defeated and the general was captured by the army of prince Toghan.

After the capture, prince Toghan considered Marquis Bảo Nghĩa a talented general so he tried to convince Trần Bình Trọng to surrender and tell him about the situation of the Trần dynasty. Refusing to co-operate, Trần Bình Trọng kicked off the gold and treasure that they offered. He was asked about the prospect of being a Prince for the Yuan dynasty, he answered by a phrase which became famous in History of Vietnam:

寧為南鬼，不為北王 Ninh vi Nam quỷ, bất vi Bắc vương.
Ta thà làm ma nước Nam chứ không thèm làm Vương đất Bắc.
I prefer to be a ghost in the South than a King in the North.

Trần Bình Trọng was killed afterwards in the same year at the age of 26. The death of Marquis Bảo Nghĩa was mourned by every member of Trần family and royal court, the Emperor posthumously entitled him as Prince Bảo Nghĩa (Bảo Nghĩa vương). The account of Battle of Đà Mạc and the capture of Trần Bình Trọng also appeared in the historical book of the Yuan dynasty, the History of Yuan. There was a difference between "Story of Annam" in History of Yuan and Đại Việt sử kí toàn thư about the date of the event at Đà Mạc, the Vietnamese work dated the battle in February while the exact day of the battle in the Chinese book was January 21 of Lunar calendar. According to modern historian Lê Mạnh Thát, the Chinese book might be more accurate in this case because most of the original historical records of the Trần dynasty were destroyed by the Ming dynasty during the fourth Chinese domination over Vietnam so maybe Ngô Sĩ Liên committed an error in copying this event.

== Legacy ==
Today, Trần Bình Trọng is still considered as one of the finest example of Vietnamese patriotism, especially through his famous phrase. Stories about his spirit and action are taught in schoolbooks of several grades while a main street in Hanoi and many other places in Vietnam are named in honour of this national hero. Trần Bình Trọng is also a subject for several literature and theatre works such as the novel Bên bờ Thiên Mạc (On the riverside of Thiên Mạc) by Hà Ân.
