= Mongol invasions of Vietnam =

13th-century Mongol-Chinese campaigns

Mongol invasions of Đại Việt and Champa (Note: Or the Mongol–Viet wars and the Mongol–Cham war)
- Part of the Mongol invasions and Kublai Khan's campaigns
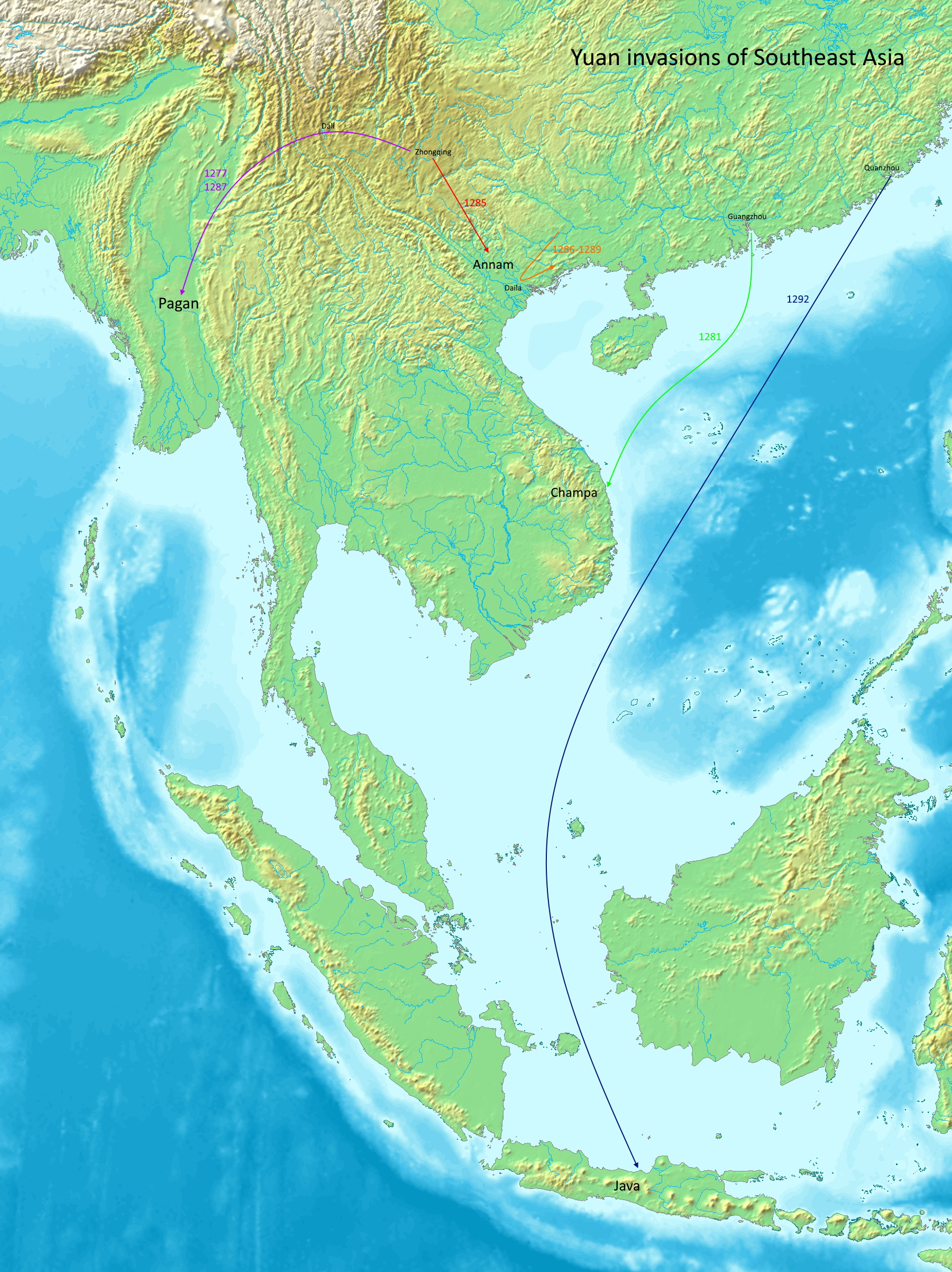
- Mongol Yuan campaigns against kingdoms of Southeast Asia.
Date	1258, 1283–1284, 1285 and 1287–1288
Location	Champa and Đại Việt (modern-day Vietnam)
Result	See Aftermath section

Belligerents
Mongol Empire (1258); Yuan dynasty (1283–1285 and 1287–1288)	Đại Việt under Trần dynasty Champa; Chinese exiles and deserters

Commanders and leaders
Möngke Khan; Uriyangkhadai; Aju; Qaidu (Note: (Tsutsumi 1989: 130) An imperial son-in-law (fuma 駙馬) of Kublai, a Khongirad, not to be confused with Qaidu Khan of the Chagatai Khanate.); Chechegtu 1283–1285: Kublai Khan; Sogetu †; Nasr ad-Din; Yiqmis; Li Heng †; Toghon; Qutuq; Ariq Qaya; Omar; Liu Gui; Aqatai 1287–1288: Kublai Khan; Toghon; Omar (POW); Trần Ích Tắc; Abači †; Liu Chun-Ching; Fan Yi (executed); Esen-Temür; Nasr ad-Din; Zhang Wenhu; Aoluchi	1257–1258: Trần Thái Tông; Lê Tần; Trần Thủ Độ 1283–1285: Trần Thánh Tông; Trần Nhân Tông; Trần Hưng Đạo; Trần Quang Khải; Trần Quốc Toản †; Trần Bình Trọng (executed); Trần Ích Tắc (surrendered); Phạm Ngũ Lão; Nguyễn Khoái Đỗ Hành; Zhao Zhong; Indravarman V Prince Harijit 1287–1288: Trần Nhân Tông; Trần Hưng Đạo; Trần Quang Khải; Trần Khánh Dư; Phạm Ngũ Lão

Strength
First invasion (1258): ~3,000 Mongols; 10,000 Yi people (Atwood estimate); 5,000 Mongol and 20,000 Yunnanese troops (Taylor estimate) ~10,000 Mongols; 20,000 Yi people (Vietnamese estimate); Second invasion (1285): ~80,000–300,000 (some speak of 500,000) in March 1285; Third invasion (1288): Remaining forces from the second invasion, Reinforcements: 70,000 Yuan troops 21,000 tribal auxiliaries 500 ships Total: 170,000	Second invasion of Đại Việt and Champa (1283–1285): 30,000 Chams c. 100,000 Vietnamese

Casualties and losses
1285: 50,000 captured 1288: 90,000 killed or drowned	1258: 10,000 killed

Four major military campaigns were launched by the Mongol Empire, and later the Yuan dynasty, against the kingdom of Đại Việt (modern-day northern Vietnam) ruled by the Trần dynasty and the kingdom of Champa (modern-day central Vietnam) in 1258, 1282–1284, 1285, and 1287–1288. The campaigns are treated by a number of scholars as a success due to the establishment of tributary relations with Đại Việt despite the Mongols suffering major military defeats. In contrast, modern Vietnamese historiography regards the war as a major victory against the foreign invaders.

The first invasion began in 1258 under the united Mongol Empire, as it looked for alternative paths to invade the Song dynasty. The Mongol general Uriyangkhadai was successful in capturing the Vietnamese capital Thăng Long (modern-day Hanoi) before turning north in 1259 to invade the Song dynasty in modern-day Guangxi as part of a coordinated Mongol attack with armies attacking in Sichuan under Möngke Khan and other Mongol armies attacking in modern-day Shandong and Henan. The first invasion also established tributary relations between the Vietnamese kingdom, formerly a Song dynasty tributary state, and the Yuan dynasty. In 1283, Kublai Khan and the Yuan dynasty launched a naval invasion of Champa that also resulted in the establishment of tributary relations.

Intending to demand greater tribute and direct Yuan oversight of local affairs in Đại Việt and Champa, the Yuan launched another invasion in 1285. The second invasion of Đại Việt failed to accomplish its goals, and the Yuan launched a third invasion in 1287 with the intent of replacing the uncooperative Đại Việt ruler Trần Nhân Tông with the defected Trần prince Trần Ích Tắc. By the end of the second and third invasions, which involved both initial successes and eventual major defeats for the Mongols, both Đại Việt and Champa decided to accept the nominal supremacy of the Yuan dynasty and became tributary states to avoid further conflict.

== Background ==
=== Conquest of Yunnan ===
Dali and Dai Viet in 1142

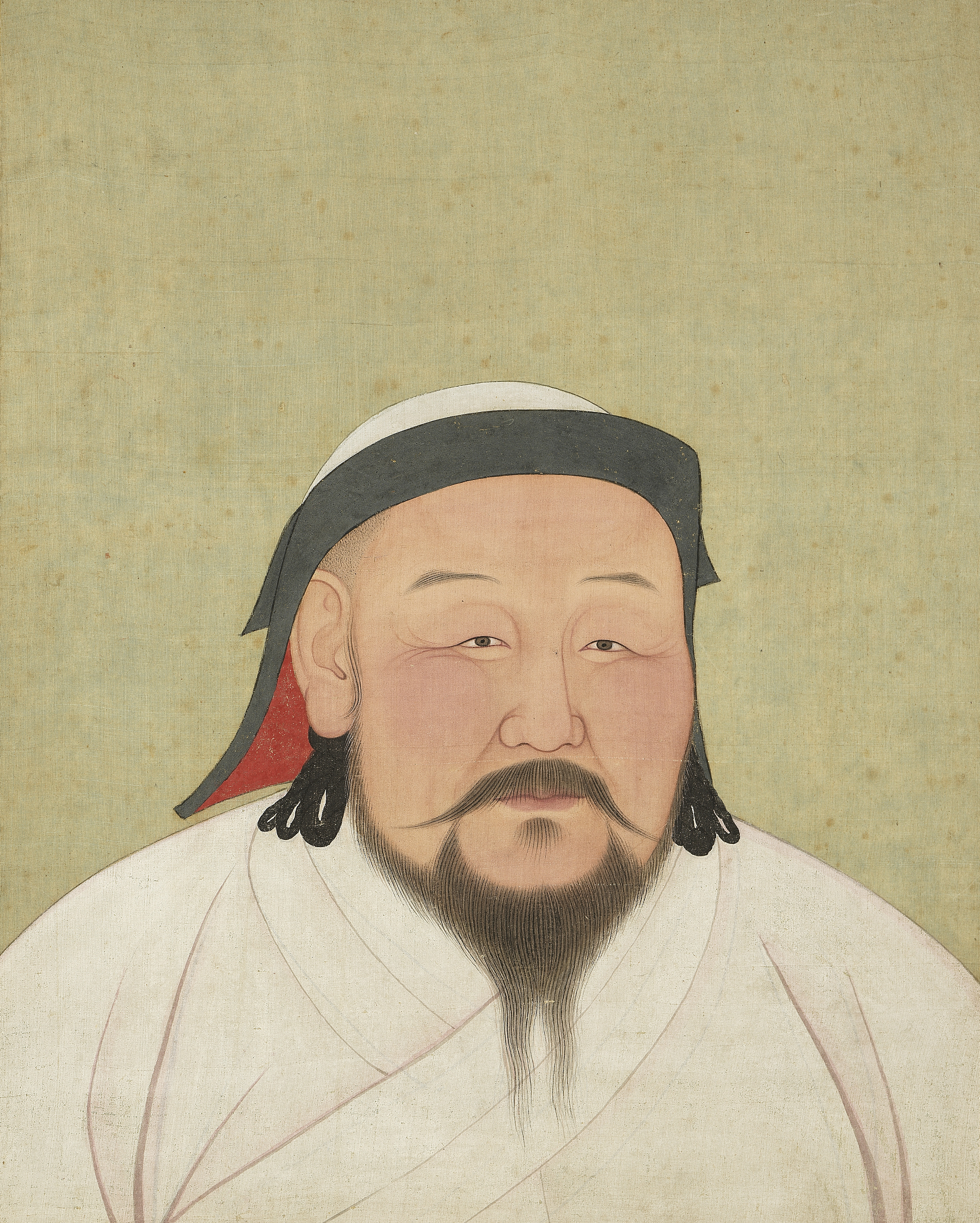
Kublai Khan, the fifth Great Khan of the Mongol Empire, and the founder of the Yuan dynasty

By the 1250s, the Mongol Empire controlled large tracts of Eurasia including much of Eastern Europe, Anatolia, North China, Mongolia, Manchuria, Central Asia, Tibet and Southwest Asia. Möngke Khan (r. 1251–59) planned to attack the Song dynasty in southern China from three directions in 1259. To avoid a costly frontal assault on the Song, which would have required a risky forced crossing of the lower Yangtze, Möngke decided to establish a base of operations in southwestern China, from which a flank attack could be staged. At the Kurultai of the summer of 1252, Möngke ordered his brother Kublai to lead the southwest campaign against the Song in Sichuan. In the autumn of 1252, 100,000 Mongols advanced to the Tao River, then penetrated the Sichuan Basin, defeating a Song army and established a major base in Sichuan.

When Mongke learned that the king Duan Xingzhi of Dali in Yunnan (a kingdom ruled by the Duan dynasty) refused to negotiate and that his prime minister Gao Xiang murdered the envoys that Möngke had sent to Dali to demand the king's surrender, Möngke ordered Kublai and Uriyangkhadai to attack Dali in summer 1253.

In September 1253, Kublai launched a three-pronged attack on Dali. The western army led by Uriyangkhadai, marching from modern-day Gansu through eastern Tibet toward Dali; the eastern army led by Wang Dezhen marched south from Sichuan, and passed just west of Chengdu before reuniting briefly with Kublai's army in the town of Xichang. Kublai's army met and engaged with Dali forces along the Jinsha River. After several skirmishes in which Dali forces repeatedly turned back the Mongol raids, Kublai's army crossed the river on inflated rafts of sheepskin in the night, and routed Dali defensive positions. With Dali forces in disarray, three Mongol columns quickly captured the capital of Dali on December 15, 1253, and even though its ruler had rejected Kublai's submission order, the capital and its inhabitants were spared. Duan Xingzhi and Gao Xiang both fled, but Gao was soon captured and beheaded. Duan Xingzhi fled to Shanchan (modern-day Kunming) and continued to resist the Mongols with aid from local clans until autumn 1255 when he was finally captured.

As they had done during other invasions, the Mongols left the native dynasty in place under the supervision of Mongolian officials. Bin Yang noted that the Duan clan was recruited to assist with further invasions of the Burmese Pagan Empire and the initial successful attack on the Vietnamese kingdom of Đại Việt.

=== Mongol approach to Đại Việt ===
At the end of 1254, Kublai returned to Mongolia to consult with his brother about the khagan title. Uriyangkhadai was left in Yunnan, and from 1254 to 1257 he conducted campaigns against local Yi and Lolo tribes. In early 1257 he returned to Gansu and sent messengers to Mongke's court informing his sovereign that Yunnan was now firmly under Mongolian control. Pleased, the emperor honored and generously rewarded Uriyangkhadai for his fine achievement. Uriyangkhadai subsequently returned to Yunnan and began preparing for the first Mongolian incursions into Southeast Asia.

The Đại Việt kingdom, or Annam, emerged in the 960s as the Vietnamese had carved up their territories in northern Vietnam (the Red River Delta) from the local Tang remnant regime since the fall of the Tang empire in 907. The kingdom had gone through four dynasties, all of which had kept a regulated peaceful tributary relationship with the Chinese Song empire. In the autumn of 1257, Uriyangkhadai sent two envoys to the Vietnamese ruler Trần Thái Tông (known as Trần Nhật Cảnh by the Mongols) demanding submission and a passage to attack the Song from the south. Trần Thái Tông opposed the encroachment of a foreign army across his territory to attack their ally, therefore the envoys were imprisoned, and soldiers on elephants were prepared to deter the Mongol troops. After the three successive envoys were imprisoned in the capital Thang Long (modern-day Hanoi) of Đại Việt, Uriyangkhadai invaded Đại Việt with generals Trechecdu and Aju in the rear.

== First invasion of Đại Việt (1258) ==
First Mongol–Vietnamese war (1257-1258)

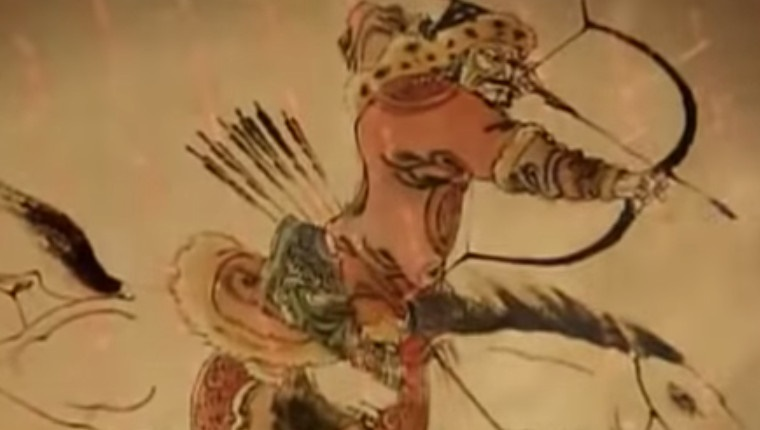
Mongol warrior on horseback, preparing a mounted archery shot.

=== Mongol forces ===
In early 1258, a Mongol column under Uriyangkhadai, the son of Subutai, entered Đại Việt via Yunnan. According to Vietnamese sources, the Mongol army consisted of at least 30,000 soldiers of whom at least 2,000 were Yi troops from the Dali Kingdom. Modern scholarship points to a force of several thousand Mongols, ordered by Kublai to invade with Uriyangkhadai in command, which battled with the Viet forces on 17 January 1258. Some Western sources estimated that the Mongol army consisted of about 3,000 Mongol warriors with an additional 10,000 Yi soldiers.

=== Campaign ===
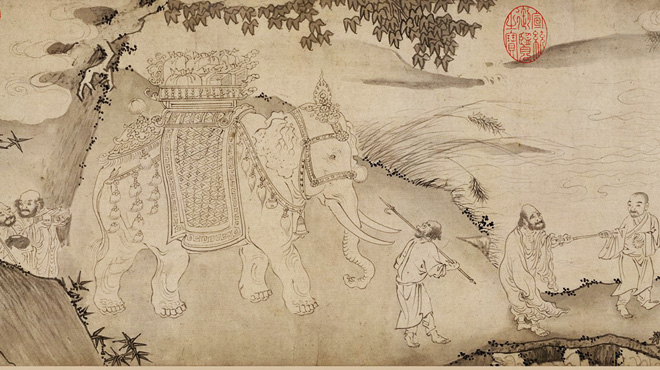
Vietnamese elephant, extracted from the Truc Lam Mahasattva scroll

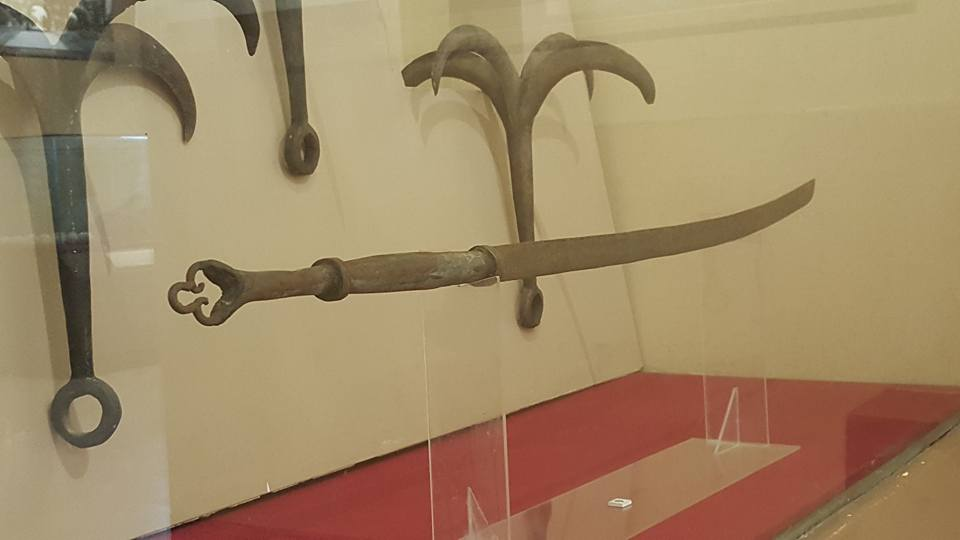
13th-century sword đao and iron-hooks. Trần dynasty period, National Treasure, Vietnam Military History Museum

In the Battle of Bình Lệ Nguyên, the Vietnamese used war elephants. Trần Thái Tông even led his army from atop an elephant. Mongol general Aju ordered his troops to fire arrows at the elephants' feet. The animals turned in panic and caused disorder in the Vietnamese army, which was routed. The Vietnamese senior leaders were able to escape on pre-prepared boats, while part of their army was destroyed at No Nguyen (modern Việt Trì on the Red River). The remainder of the Đại Việt army again suffered a major defeat in a fierce battle at the Phú Lộ bridge the following day. This led the Vietnamese monarch to evacuate the capital. The Đại Việt annals reported that the evacuation was carried out "in an orderly manner"; however, this is viewed as an embellishment, because the Vietnamese had to retreat in disarray, leaving their weapons behind in the capital. According to Vietnamese historian Lê Tắc (1263-1342), the Trần army suffered 10,000 deaths in two battles against Uriyangkhadai's Mongols between January 17–22.

Trần Thái Tông fled to an offshore island, while the Mongols occupied the capital city, Thăng Long (modern-day Hanoi). They found their envoys in prison, with one of them already deceased. In revenge, Mongols massacred the city's inhabitants. Although the Mongols had successfully captured the capital, the provinces around the capital were still under Vietnamese control. While Chinese source material is sometimes misinterpreted as saying that Uriyangkhadai withdrew from Vietnam due to poor climate, Uriyangkhadai left Thang Long after nine days to invade the Song dynasty in modern-day Guangxi in a coordinated Mongol attack, with some armies attacking in Sichuan under Möngke Khan and other armies attacking in modern-day Shandong and Henan. The Mongol army gained the popular local nickname of "Buddhist enemies" because they did not loot or kill while moving north to Yunnan. After the loss of a prince and the capital, Trần Thái Tông submitted to the Mongols.

One month after fleeing the capital in 1258, Trần Thái Tông returned and commenced regular diplomatic relations and a tributary relationship with the Mongol court, treating the Mongols as equals to the embattled Southern Song dynasty without renouncing Đại Việt's ties to the Song. In March 1258, Trần Thái Tông retired and let his son, prince Trần Hoảng, succeed to the throne. In the same year, the new emperor sent envoys to the Mongols in Yunnan. Having the submission and assistance of the new ruler of Đại Việt, Uriyangkhadai immediately assembled an army of 3,000 Mongol cavalry and 10,000 Dali troops upon his return to Yunnan. Via Đại Việt, he launched a new assault on the Song in the summer of 1259, moving into Guilin and reaching as far as Tanzhou (in modern-day Hunan Province) in a joint offensive led by Möngke.

The sudden death of Möngke in August 1259 halted the Mongol efforts to conquer Song China. In Mongolia, prince Ariq Böke proclaimed himself as ruler of the Mongol Empire. In China, prince Kublai also declared himself as the ruler of the empire. In the following years, the Mongols were preoccupied with the succession struggle between Ariq Böke and Kublai, and the two kingdoms in Vietnam were left in peace.

== Invasion of Champa (1283) ==
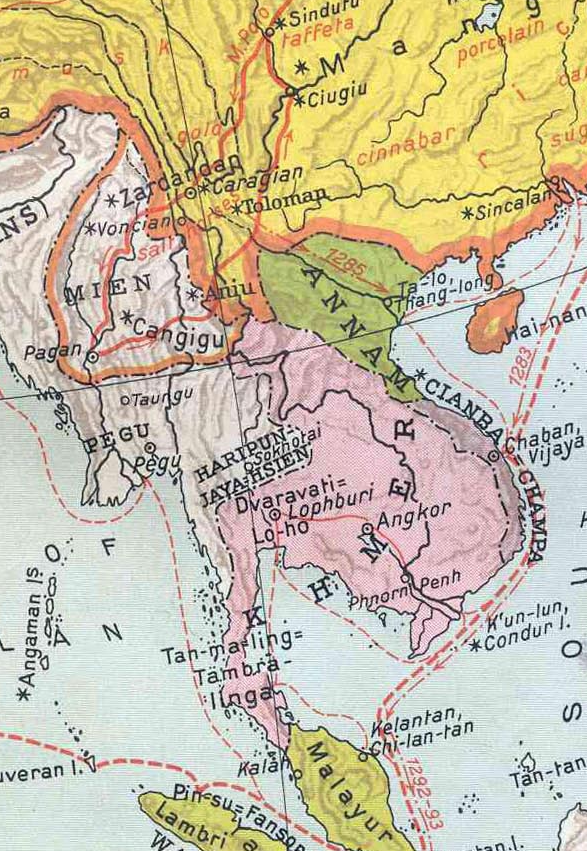
Mongol Yuan campaigns against Burma, Champa, and Dai Viet and the route of Marco Polo. Drawn by German archaeologist Albert Herrmann. The location of Cangigu (i.e., Caugigu, which was Tung-king, or Kiao-chi, or Annam) was too far to the west, inside the Mien (Burma) country, contrary to the interpretation of the great French sinologist Paul Pelliot and modern Marco-Polo scholars. See the Yule-Cordier map version below.

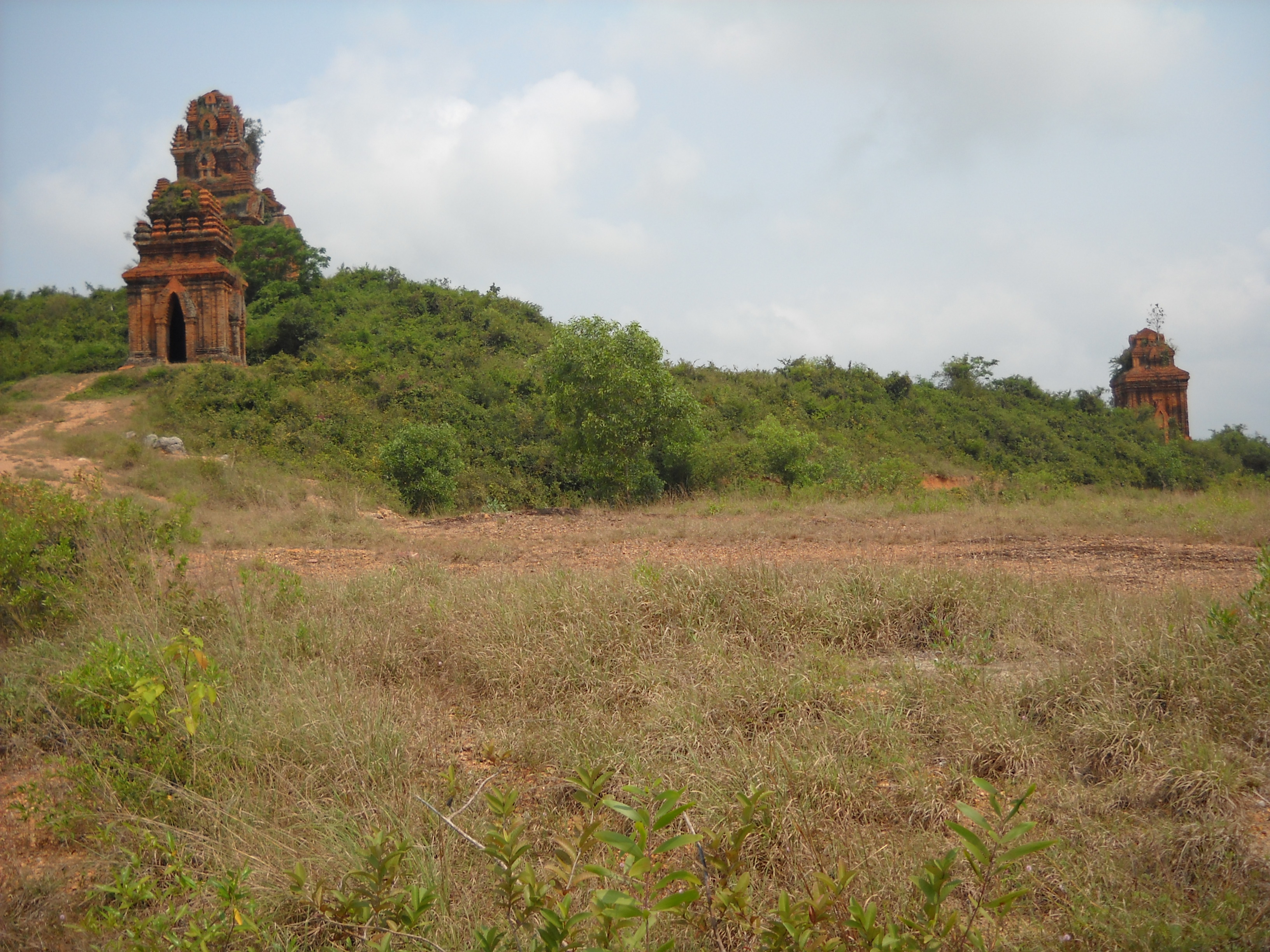
Modern-day remains of Vijaya (Đồ Bàn)

=== Background and diplomacy ===
With the defeat of the Song dynasty in 1276, the newly established Yuan dynasty turned its attention to the south, particularly Champa and Đại Việt. Kublai was interested in Champa because, by geographical location, it dominated the sea routes between China and the states of Southeast Asia and India. The Mongol court viewed Champa as a key region to control trade in Southeast Asia. The position of Historian Geoff Wade is that they would be able to gain access to commodities from the states across the Indian Ocean through Arab and Persian merchants managing trade from Champa. Although the king of Champa accepted the status of a Mongol protectorate, his submission was unwilling. In late 1281, Kublai issued the edict ordering the mobilization of a hundred ships and ten thousand men, consisting of official Yuan forces, former Song troops and sailors, to invade Sukhothai, Lopburi, Malabar and other countries, and Champa "will be instructed to furnish the food supplies of the troops." However, his plans were canceled, as the Yuan court discussed that they would send envoys to these countries to make them submit to the Yuan. This suggestion was successfully adopted, but these missions all had to pass by or stop at Champa. Kublai knew that pro-Song sentiment was strong in Champa, as the Cham king had been sympathetic to the Song cause.

A large number of Chinese officials, soldiers and civilians who fled from the Mongols were refugees in Champa, and they had inspired and incited to hate the Yuan. Thus, in the summer of 1282, when Yuan envoys He Zizhi, Hangfu Jie, Yu Yongxian, and Yilan passed through Champa, they were detained and imprisoned by the Cham Prince Harijit. In summer 1282, Kublai ordered Sogetu of the Jalairs, the governor of Guangzhou, to lead a punitive expedition to the Chams. Kublai declared: "The old king (Jaya Indravarman V) is innocent. The ones who oppose to our order are his son (Harijit) and a Southern Chinese." In late 1282, Sogetu led a maritime invasion of Champa with 5,000 men, but could only muster 100 ships and 250 landing crafts because most of the Yuan ships had been lost in the invasions of Japan.

=== Campaign ===
Sogetu's fleet arrived on Champa's shore, near modern-day Thị Nại Bay, in February 1283. The Cham defenders had already prepared a fortified wooden palisade on the west shore of the bay. The Mongols landed at midnight of 13 February and attacked the stockade on three sides. The Cham defenders opened the gate, marched to the beach and met the Yuan with 10,000 men and several scores of elephants. Undaunted, the highly experienced Mongol general selected points of attack and launched an assault so fierce that they broke through. The Yuan eventually routed their enemy and captured Cham forts and their vast supplies. Sogetu arrived in the Cham capital Vijaya and captured the city two days later, but then withdrew and set up camps outside the city. The aged Champa king Indravarman V abandoned his temporary headquarters in the palace, and set fire to his warehouses and retreated out of the capital, avoiding Mongol attempts to capture him in the hills. The Cham king and prince Harijit both refused to visit the Yuan camp. The Cham executed two captured Yuan envoys and ambushed Sogetu's troops in the mountains.

As the Cham delegates continued to offer excuses, the Yuan commanders gradually began to realize that the Chams had no intention of coming to terms and were only using the negotiations to stall for time. From a captured spy, Sogetu knew that Indravarman had 20,000 men with him in the mountains; he had summoned Cham reinforcements from Panduranga (Phan Rang) in the south, and also dispatched emissaries to Đại Việt, the Khmer Empire and Java to seek aid. On 16 March, Sogetu sent a strong force into the mountains to seek and destroy the hideout of the Cham king. It was ambushed and driven back with heavy losses. His son would wage guerrilla warfare against the Yuan for the next two years, eventually wearing down the invaders.

The Yuan withdrew to the wooden stockade on the beach to await reinforcements and supplies. Sogetu's men unloaded the supplies, cleared fields farming rice so he was able to harvest 150,000 piculs of rice that summer. Sogetu sent two officers to threaten the king of the Khmer Empire, Jayavarman VIII, but they were detained. Stymied by the withdrawal of the Champa king, Sogetu asked Kublai for reinforcements. In March 1284 another Yuan fleet with more than 20,000 troops in 200 ships under Ataqai and Ariq Qaya anchored off the coast of Vijaya. Sogetu presented his plan to have reinforcements to invade Champa marching through the vassalised Đại Việt. Kublai accepted his plan and put his son Toghan in command, with Sogetu as second in command.

== Second invasion of Đại Việt (1285) ==
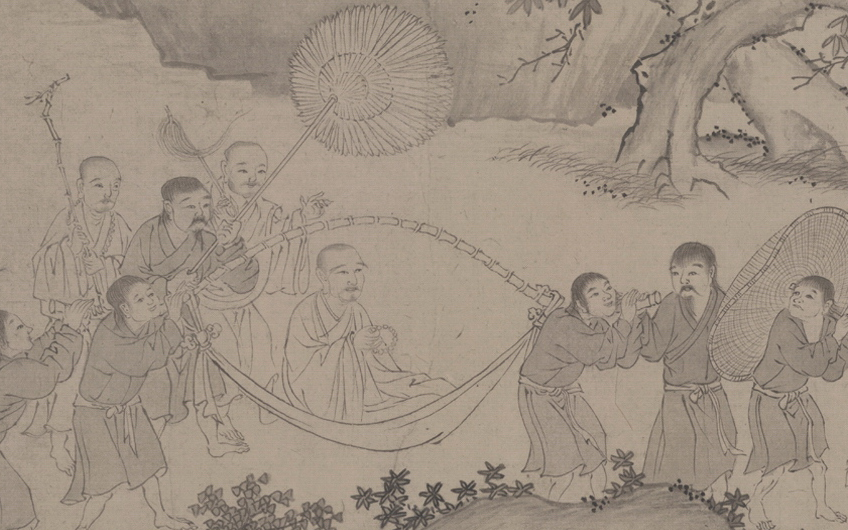
King Trần Nhân Tông, the political leader of Đại Việt during the Mongol invasion, ruled from 1278 to 1293

=== Interlude (1260–1284) ===
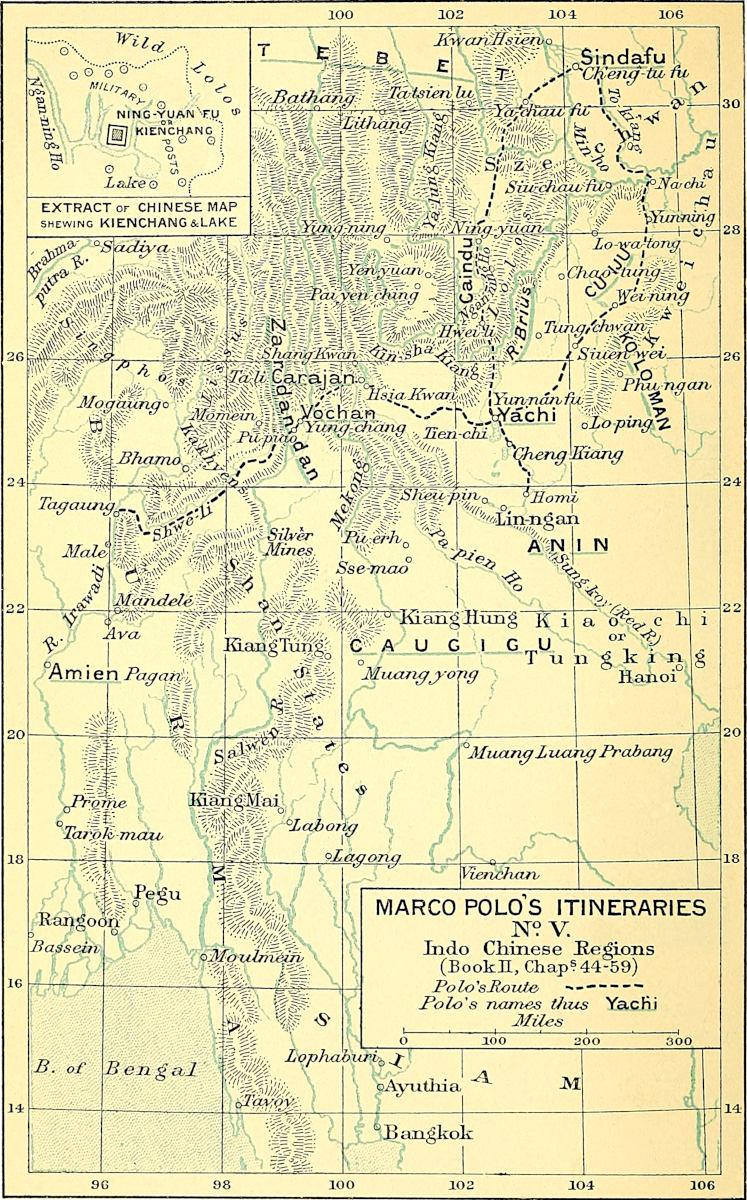
Marco Polo's itinerary in South West China and South East Asia in the Yule-Cordier edition of Marco Polo's Travels. The location of Caugigu (which was a different name for the kingdom of Dai Viet, i.e., Kiao-chi, or Tung-King, or Annam) in this map is more accurate than in the map by A. Herrmann above.

In 1261, Kublai enfeoffed Trần Thánh Tông as "King of Annam" (Annan guowang) and began operating a nominal darughachi (tax collector) in Dai Viet. The darughachi, Sayyid Ajall, reported that the Vietnamese king had corrupted him occasionally. In 1267, Kublai was dissatisfied with the tributary arrangement, which granted the Yuan dynasty the same amount of tribute that the former Song dynasty had received, and demanded larger payments. He sent his son Hugaci to the Vietnamese court with a list of demands, such as both monarchs submitting in person, censuses, taxes in both money and labor, incense, gold, silver, cinnabar, agarwood, sandalwood, ivory, tortoiseshell, pearls, rhinoceros horn, silk floss, and porcelain cups – requirements that neither of the two kingdoms had met. Later that year, Kublai required that the Đại Việt court send two Muslim merchants, whom he believed to be in Đại Việt, to China, in order for them to serve on missions in the Western regions, and designated the heir apparent of the Yuan as "Prince of Yunnan" to take control of Dali, Shanshan (Kunming) and Đại Việt. This meant that Đại Việt would be incorporated into the Yuan Empire, which the Vietnamese found totally unacceptable.

In 1278, Trần Thái Tông died. King Trần Thánh Tông retired and made crown prince Trần Khâm (known as Trần Nhân Tông, and to the Mongol as Trần Nhật Tôn) his successor. Kublai sent a mission led by Chai Chun to Đại Việt, and once again urged the new king to come to China in person, but the king refused. The Yuan then refused to recognize him as king, and tried to place a Vietnamese defector as king of Đại Việt. Frustrated with the failed diplomatic missions, many Yuan officials urged Kublai to send a punitive expedition to Đại Việt. In 1283, Khublai Khan sent Ariq Qaya to Đại Việt with an imperial request for Đại Việt to help attack Champa through Vietnamese territory, and demands for provisions and other support for the Yuan army, but the king refused.

In 1284, Kublai appointed his son Toghon to command an overland force to assist Sogetu. Toghon demanded that the Vietnamese allow his passage to Champa, in order to attack the Cham army from both north and south, but they refused, and concluded that this was the pretext for a Yuan conquest of Đại Việt. Nhân Tông ordered a defensive war against the Yuan invasion, with Prince Trần Quốc Tuấn in charge of the army. A Yuan envoy recorded that the Vietnamese had already sent 500 ships to help the Cham. In fall 1284, Toghon began moving his troops to the borders with Đại Việt, and in December an envoy reported that Kublai had ordered Toghon, Pingzhang Ali and Ariq Qaya to enter Đại Việt under the guise of attacking Champa, but instead to invade Đại Việt. Southern Song Chinese military officers and civilian officials who had intermarried with the Vietnamese ruling elite then went to serve the government in Champa, as recorded by Zheng Sixiao. Southern Song soldiers were part of the Vietnamese army prepared by King Trần Thánh Tông against the second Mongol invasion. Also in the same year, the Venetian traveler Marco Polo almost certainly visited Đại Việt (Note: Marco Polo's "account is in almost perfect agreement with what we know from Chinese sources on the production or imports, forms, values and exchange rates, weights, denominations as well as use of these currencies in public and private domains. These findings support the argument of Haw and others that Marco Polo's account of the itinerary from Cambaluc to Yunnan, Myanmar and Annam [Đại Việt or Caugigu] is so good (and so much better than has ever previously been appreciated) that he almost certainly undertook it himself." (Note: See the detailed documentation on Marco Polo's Caugigu (or Đại Việt) by well-known scholars and how to use the chart From Marco Polo to Pham Ngu Lao, 1284 in Marco Polo's Caugigu - Phạm Ngũ Lão's Đại Việt - 1285.)) (Caugigu) (Note: Caugigu refers to Giao Chỉ, or Đại Việt, or Annam at the time, the northern part of modern-day Vietnam.) almost when the Yuan and the Vietnamese were ready for war, then he went to Chengdu via Heni (Amu).

=== War ===
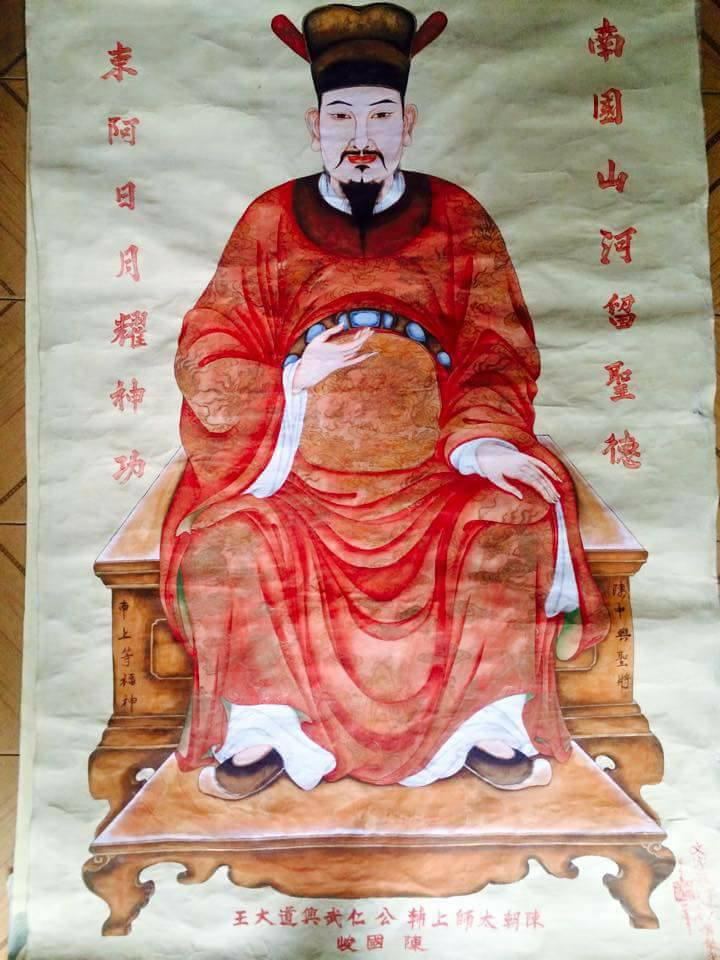
Portrait of Prince Trần Quốc Tuấn (1228–1300), who was known to the Mongol as Hưng Đạo đại Vương, the military hero of Đại Việt during the second and third Mongols invasions

Second Mongol invasion of Vietnam (1284–1285)

==== Mongol advance (January – May 1285) ====
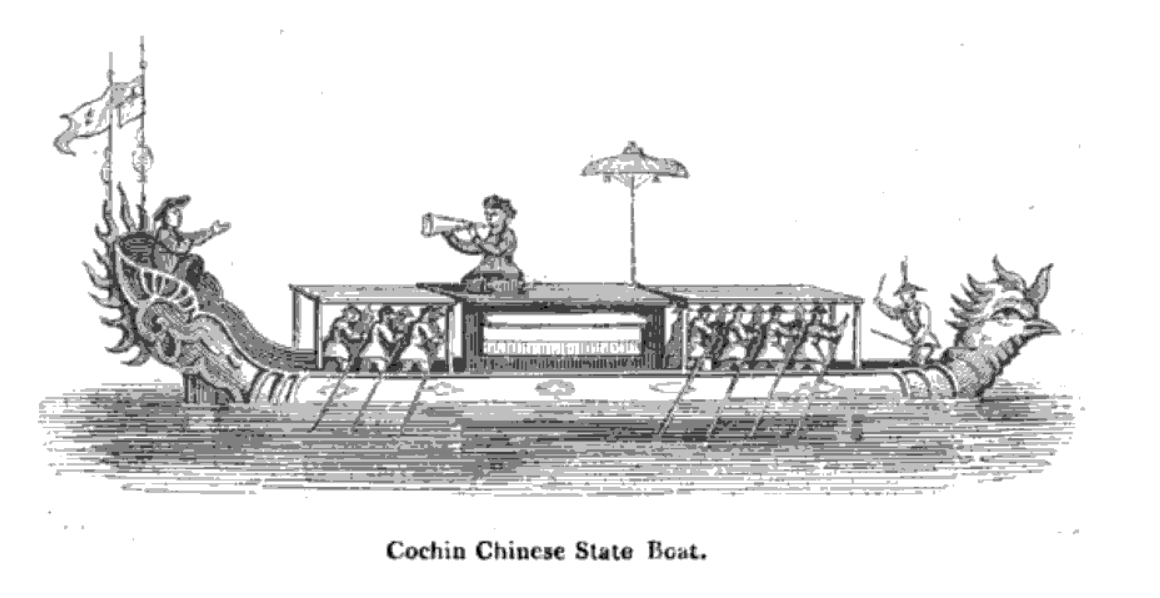
Vietnamese sailing boat, 1828, image by John Crawfurd

The Yuan land army invaded Đại Việt under the command of prince Toghon and Uighur general Ariq Qaya, while Tangut general Li Heng and Muslim general Omar led the navy. Another Yuan column entered Đại Việt from Yunnan, led by Nasr ad-Din bin Sayyid Ajall – the Khwarezmian general who was appointed to govern Yunnan and lead the second campaign against the Kingdom of Bagan in winter 1277 – while Yunnan was left to the hands of Yaghan Tegin. The Vietnamese forces were reported to number 100,000. Trần Hưng Đạo was the general of the combined Đại Việt land and naval forces. Yuan troops crossed the Nam Quan Pass on 27 January 1285, divided in six columns while working their way down the rivers. After defeating Vietnamese troops at the battles of Khả Ly and Nội Bàng (in present-day Lục Ngạn), Mongol forces under Omar reached Prince Quốc Tuấn's stronghold at Vạn Kiếp (modern-day Chí Linh) on 10 February, and three days later they broke the Vietnamese defenses to reach the north bank of the Cầu River. On 18 February, the Mongols used captured boats and defeated the Vietnamese, successfully crossing the river. All captured soldiers found to have the words "Sát Thát" ("Death to the Mongols") tattooed on their arms were executed. Instead of advancing further south, the victorious Yuan forces remained on the north bank of the river, fighting daily skirmishes but making few advances against the Vietnamese in the south.

Toghon sent an officer named Tanggudai to instruct Sogetu, who was in Huế, to march north in a pincer movement while at the same time sending frantic appeals for reinforcements from China, and wrote to the Vietnamese king that the Yuan forces had come in, not as enemies but as allies against Champa. In late February, Sogetu's forces marching north through the pass of Nghệ An, capturing the cities of Vinh and Thanh Hoá, as well as Vietnamese supply bases in Nam Định and Ninh Bình, and taking prisoner 400 Song officers who had fought alongside the Vietnamese. Prince Quốc Tuấn divided his forces in an effort to prevent Sogetu from joining with Toghon, but this effort failed and they were overwhelmed. Phạm Ngũ Lão fought against the Mongols in this second Mongol invasion as well as in the third Mongol invasion. (Note: "At the same time [late 1284], Tran Quoc Tuan and his son-in-law Pham Ngu Lao led a force in several hundred war boats through the rivers back to Van Kiep, the headquarters for Togan’s supply line from the border to Thang Long.") (Note: "Trận Bạch-đằng-giang đánh vào tháng ba năm mậu-tí (1288) lấy được chiến-thuyền của quân Nguyên hơn 400 chiếc và bắt được quân-sĩ rất nhiều. 5. HƯNG-ĐẠO-VƯƠNG ĐẠI PHÁ NGUYÊN-BINH. Thoát Hoan nghe tin quân thủy vỡ tan rồi, dẫn bọn Trình bằng Phi, A bát Xích, Áo lỗ Xích, Trương Quân, Trương Ngọc, đi đường bộ chạy về đến ải Nội-bàng, bỗng gặp quân phục của Phạm ngũ Lão đổ ra đánh." In this classic 1920 Vietnam-history book, it was explicitly stated that Phạm ngũ Lão participated in the battle against the Mongols in 1288.)

Trần envoys offered peace terms, which were rejected by Toghon and Omar. In late February, Toghon launched a full offensive against Đại Việt. A Yuan fleet under the command of Omar attacked along the Đuống River, captured Thang Long and drove king Nhân Tông to the sea. After hearing about the successive defeats, king Trần Nhân Tông travelled by small boat to meet Trần Hưng Đạo in Quảng Ninh and ask him if Đại Việt should surrender. Trần Hưng Đạo resisted and asked for the aid of the private armies of the Trần princes. Many Vietnamese royals and nobles were frightened and defected to the Yuan, including prince Trần Ích Tắc. Having successfully captured the capital Thăng Long, the Yuan found that the city's grain had been taken to deny Yuan access to supplies and therefore Yuan forces could not turn the occupied capital into a strategic gain. The following day, Toghon entered the capital and found nothing but an empty palace. Trần Hưng Đạo escorted the Trần royalty to their royal estates at Thiên Trường in Nam Định. The Yuan forces under Omar launched two naval offensives in April and drove the Vietnamese forces further south. The Trần forces had their forces surrounded by the Yuan army while their king fled along the coast to Thanh Hóa.

==== Vietnamese counterattack (May – June 1285) ====
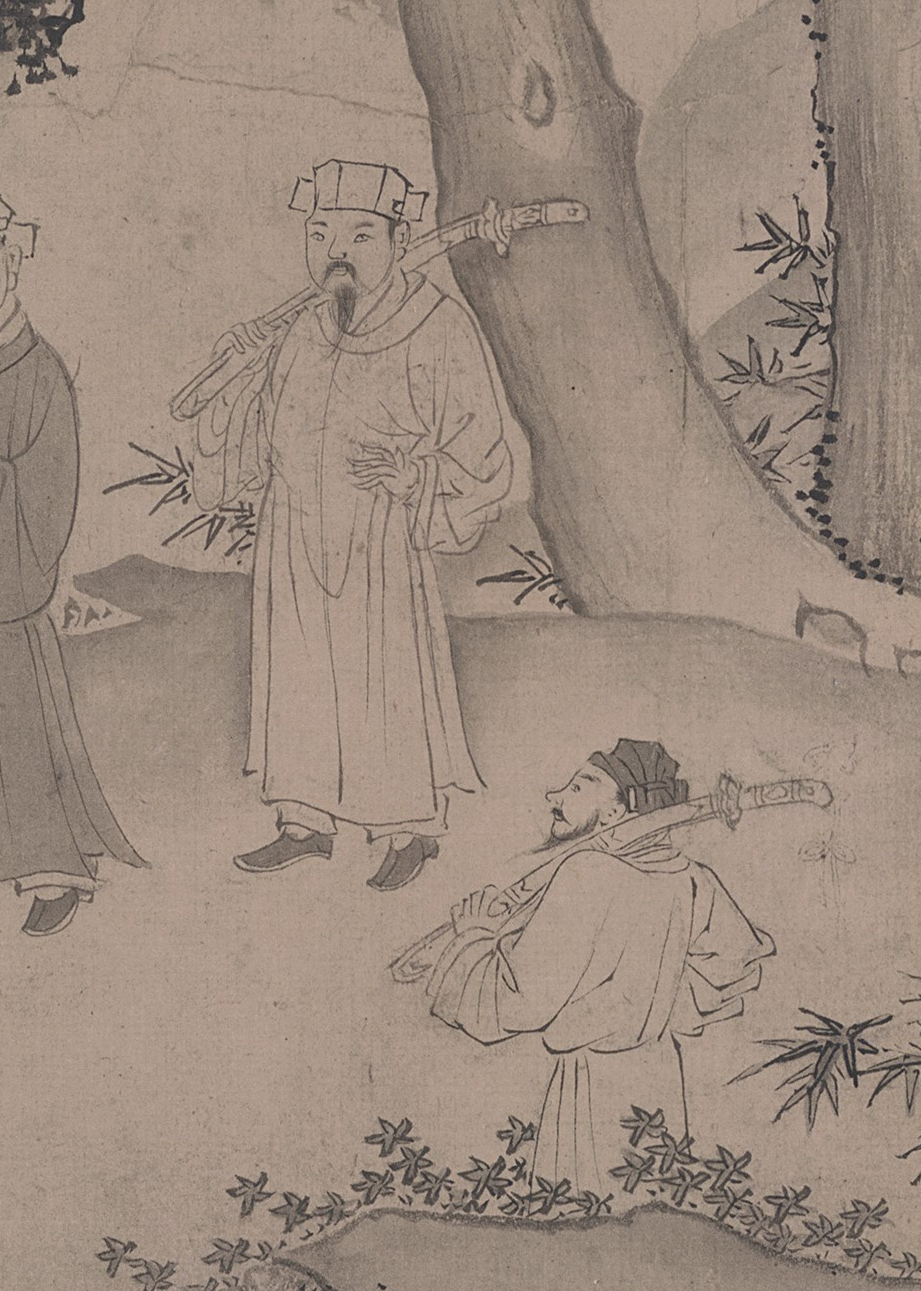
Vietnamese military officers during Lý-Trần dynasties.

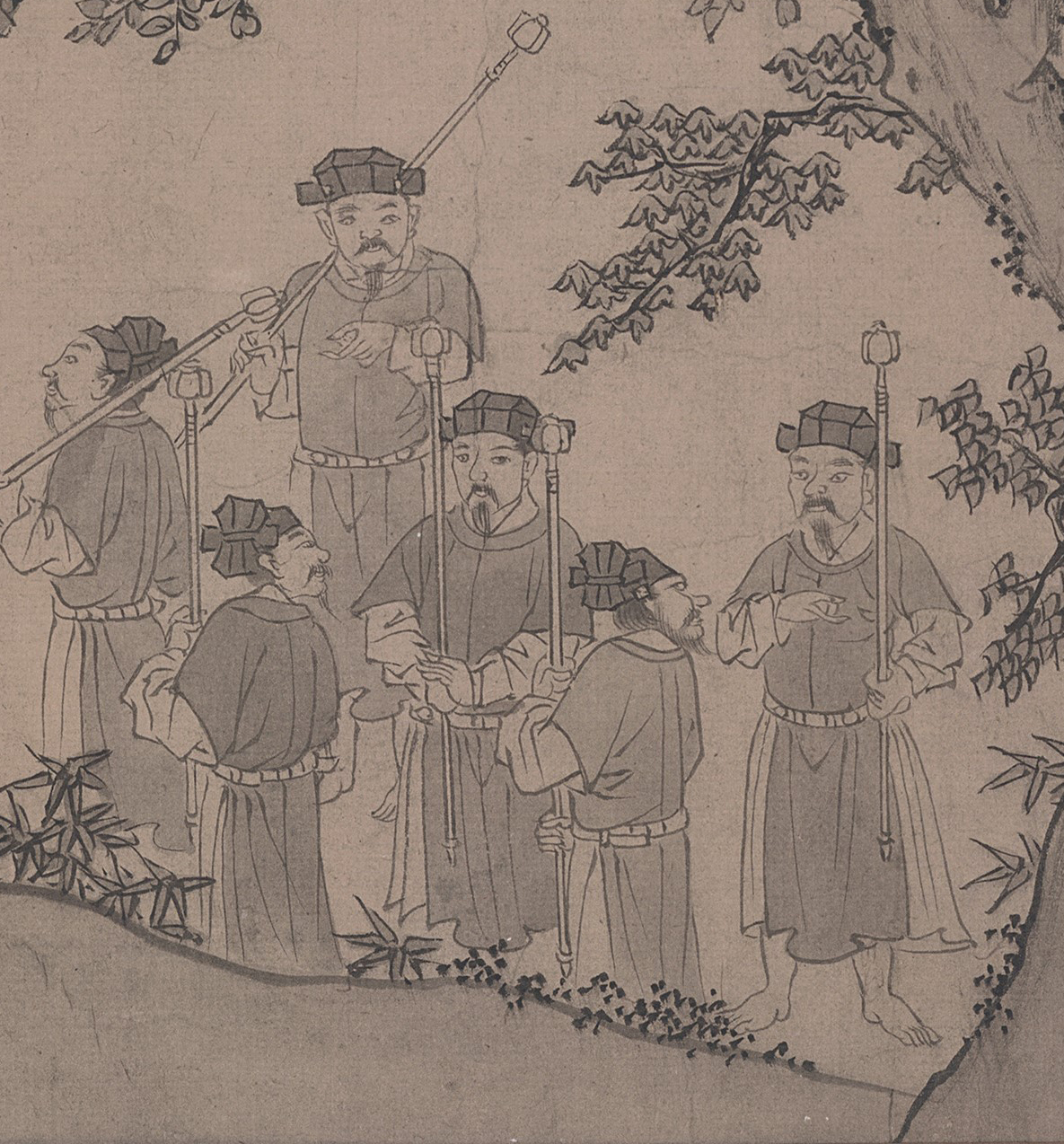
Vietnamese Imperial Guards during Lý-Trần dynasties. The medieval Vietnamese army consisted mostly of lightly-armored troops, but were capable of maritime-warfare.

In May 1285, the situation began to change, as the Yuan had overextended their supply network. Toghon ordered Sogetu to lead his troops in an attack on Nam Định (the main Vietnamese base) to seize supplies. As fighting broke out, Toghon ordered Sogetu to return to Champa and for Omar to join his withdrawal on the Red River. Toghon prepared to leave Đại Việt for Siming in Guangxi, China, with the warm weather and disease in Đại Việt given as the official reason. In a naval battle in Hàm Tử (in modern-day Khoái Châu District) in late May 1285, a contingent of Yuan troops was defeated by a partisan force consisting of former Song troops led by Zhao Zhong under prince Nhật Duật and native militia. On 9 June 1285, Mongol troops evacuated Thăng Long to withdraw to China. The History of Yuan records the Mongols withdrawing from Thăng Long because "the Mongol troops and horses could not exercise their familiar skills in battle there" while the An Nam chí lược records that "Annam attacked and retook the capital La Thành (Thănh Long)."

Taking advantage, the Vietnamese force under Prince Quốc Tuấn sailed north and attacked the Yuan camp at Vạn Kiếp, and further severed Yuan supplies. Many Yuan generals were killed in the battle, among them the senior Li Heng, who was struck by a poisoned arrow. The Yuan forces collapsed into disarray, and Sogetu was killed in the Battle of Chương Dương near the capital by a joint force of Trần Quang Khải, Phạm Ngũ Lão and Trần Quốc Tuấn in June 1285. To protect Toghon, the Yuan soldiers made a copper box in which they hid him inside until they were able to retreat to the Guangxi border. Yuan generals Omar and Liu Gui ran to the sea and escaped to China in a small boat. The Yuan remnants retreated to China in late June 1285, as the Vietnamese king and royals returned to the capital in Thăng Long following six-month conflict.

== Third invasion of Đại Việt (1287–1288) ==
Third Mongol invasion of Vietnam (1287-1288)

=== Background and preparations ===
In 1286, Kublai appointed Trần Thánh Tông's younger brother, Prince Trần Ích Tắc, as the King of Đại Việt from afar with the intent of dealing with the uncooperative incumbent Trần Nhân Tông. Trần Ích Tắc, who had already surrendered to the Yuan, was willing to lead a Yuan army into Đại Việt to take the throne. The Khan cancelled plans underway for a third invasion of Japan in August to concentrate military preparations in the south. He accused the Vietnamese of raiding China, and pressed the efforts of China should be directed towards winning the war against Đại Việt.

In October 1287, the Yuan land forces commanded by Toghon (assisted by Nasr al-Din and Kublai's grandson Esen-Temür; Esen-Temur meanwhile was fighting in Burma) moved southwards from Guangxi and Yunnan in three divisions led by general Abači and Changyu, with the naval expedition led by generals Omar, Zhang Wenhu, and Aoluchi. The army was complemented by a large naval force that advanced from Qinzhou, with the intent to form a large pincer movement against the Vietnamese. The force was composed of 70,000 Mongols, Jurchen, Han Chinese from Jiangsu, Jiangxi, Hunan, and Guangdong; 6,000 Yunnanese troops; 1,000 former Song troops; 6,000 Guangxi troops; 17,000 Li troops from Hainan; and 18,000 crewmen. Total Yuan forces raised up to 170,000 men for this invasion.

=== Campaign ===
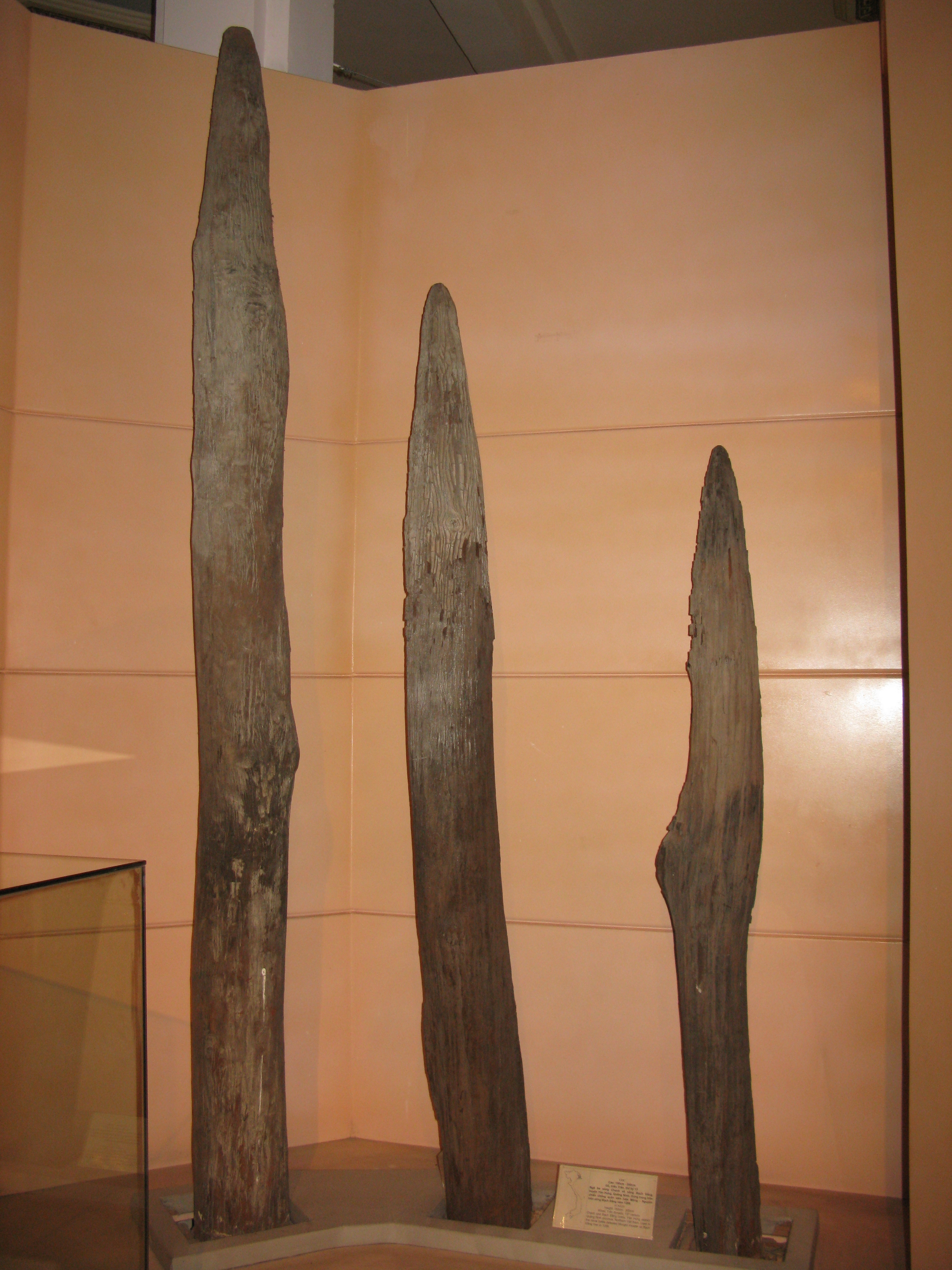
Wooden stakes from the Bach Dang river in Museum of Vietnam

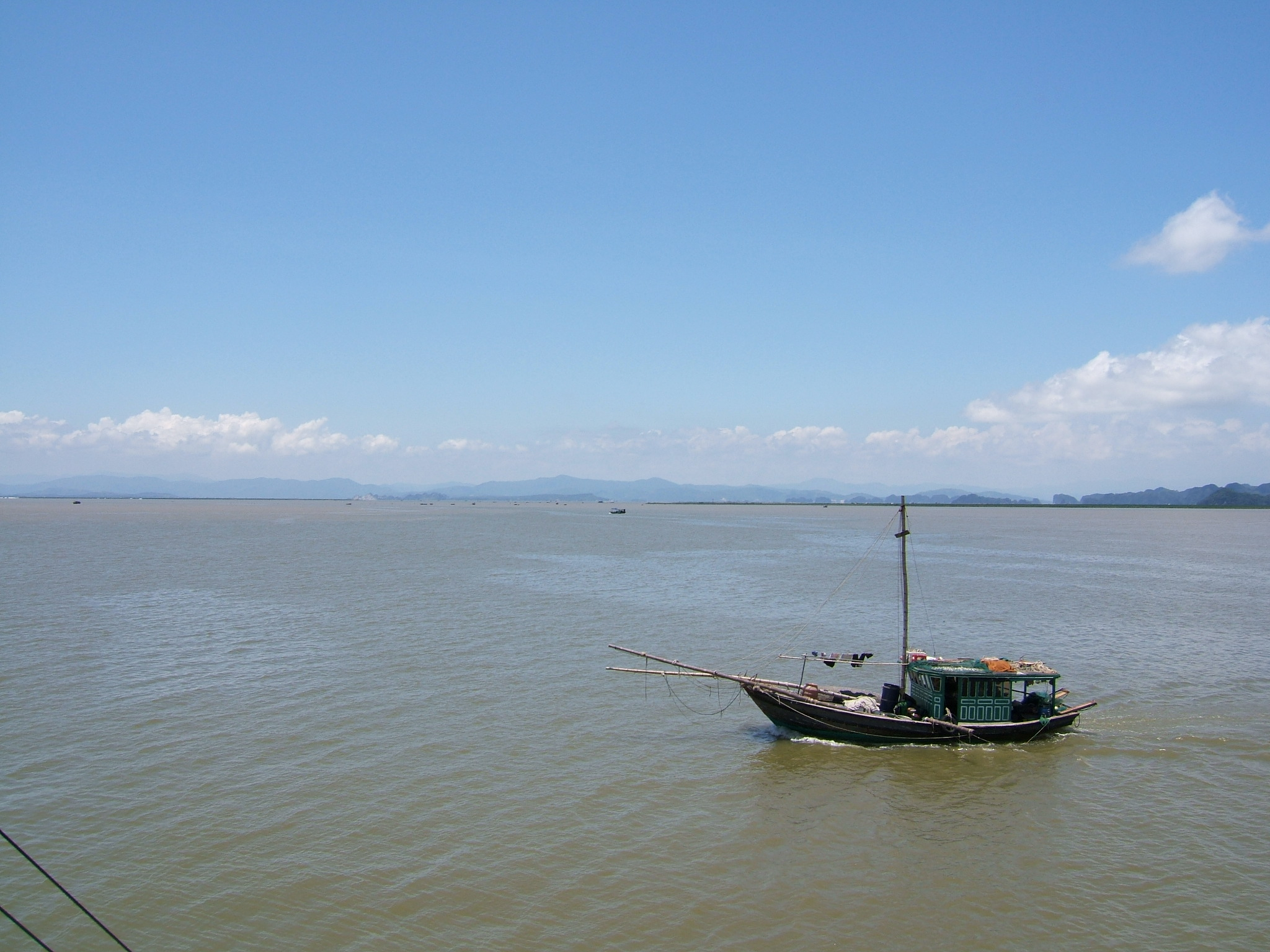
Bạch Đằng River

The Yuan were successful in the early phases of the invasion, occupying and looting the Đại Việt capital.

In January 1288, as Omar's fleet passed through the Ha Long Bay to join Toghon's forces in Vạn Kiếp, followed by Zhang Wenhu's supply fleet, the Vietnamese navy under prince Trần Khánh Dư attacked and destroyed Wenhu's fleet. The Yuan land army under Toghon and naval fleet under Omar, both already in Vạn Kiếp, were unaware of the loss of their supply fleet. Despite that, in February 1288 Toghon ordered to attack the Vietnamese forces. Toghon returned to the capital Thăng Long to loot food, while Omar destroyed king Trần Thái Tông's tomb in Thái Bình.

Due to a lack of food supplies, Toghon and Omar's army retreated from Thăng Long to their fortified main base in Vạn Kiếp northeast of Hanoi on 5 March 1288. They planned to withdraw from Đại Việt but waited for the supplies to arrive before departing. As food supplies ran low and their position became untenable, on 30 March 1288 Toghon ordered a retreat to China. He boarded a large warship while Prince Hưng Đạo, aware of the Yuan retreat, prepared to attack. The Vietnamese destroyed bridges and roads and created traps along the route of the retreating Yuan army. They pursued Toghon's forces to Lạng Sơn, where on 10 April, Toghon himself was struck by a poisoned arrow, and was forced to abandon his ship and avoid highways as he was escorted back through the forests to Siming in Guangxi, China by his few remaining troops. Most of Toghon's land force were killed or captured. Meanwhile, the Yuan fleet commanded by Omar was retreating through the Bạch Đằng river.

At the Bạch Đằng River in April 1288, Prince Hưng Đạo commanding the Vietnamese forces staged an ambush on Omar's Yuan fleet in the third Battle of Bạch Đằng. The Vietnamese placed hidden metal-tipped wooden stakes in the riverbed and attacked the fleet once it had been impaled on the stakes. Omar himself was taken prisoner. The Yuan fleet was destroyed and the army retreated in disarray without supplies. A few days later, Zhang Wenhu, who believed that the Yuan armies were still in Vạn Kiếp and was unaware of the Yuan defeat, sailed his transport fleet into the Bạch Đằng river and was destroyed by the Vietnamese navy. Only Wenhu and a few Yuan soldiers managed to escape. Phạm Ngũ Lão fought against the Mongols in this third Mongol invasion as well as in the second Mongol invasion mentioned above. (Note: "Tran Quoc Tuan’s son-in-law Pham Ngu Lao, who gained fame for laying ambushes for Togan in the northern mountains, actively led soldiers on the frontiers until just before his death in 1320.")

Several thousand Yuan troops, unfamiliar with the terrain, were lost and never regained contact with the main force. An account of the battle by Lê Tắc, a Vietnamese scholar who defected to the Yuan in 1285, said that the remnants of the army followed him north in retreat and reached Yuan-controlled territory on the Lunar New Year's Day in 1289. When the Yuan troops were withdrawn before malaria season, Lê Tắc went north with them. Many of his companions, ten thousand died between the mountain passes of the Sino-Viet borderlands. After the war Lê Tắc got permanently exiled in China, and was appointed by the Yuan government to the position of Prefect of Pacified Siam (Tongzhi Anxianzhou).

== Aftermath ==
=== Yuan dynasty ===
The Yuan dynasty was unable to militarily defeat the Vietnamese and the Cham. Kublai, angry over the Yuan defeats in Đại Việt, banished prince Toghon to Yangzhou and wanted to launch another invasion, but was persuaded in 1291 to send Minister of Rites Zhang Lidao to induce Trần Nhân Tông to come to China. The Yuan mission arrived at the Vietnamese capital on 18 March 1292 and stayed in a guesthouse, where the king made a protocol with Zhang. Trần Nhân Tông sent a mission with a memo to return with Zhang Lidao to China. In the memo, Trần Nhân Tông explained his inability to visit China. The detail said that of ten Vietnamese envoys to Dadu, six or seven of them died on the way. He wrote a letter to Kublai Khan describing the death and destruction the Mongol armies had wrought, vividly recounting the brutality of the soldiers and the desecration of sacred Buddhist sites. Instead of going to Dadu himself, the Vietnamese king sent a golden statue to the Yuan court and an apology for his "sins".

Another Yuan mission was sent in September 1292. As late as 1293, Kublai Khan planned a fourth military campaign to install Trần Ích Tắc as the King of Đại Việt, but the plans for the campaign were halted when Kublai Khan died in early 1294. The new Yuan emperor, Temür Khan announced that the war with Đại Việt was over, and sent a mission to Đại Việt to restore friendly relations between the two countries.

=== Đại Việt ===
Three Mongol and Yuan invasions devastated Đại Việt, but the Vietnamese did not succumb to Yuan demands. Eventually, not a single Trần king or prince visited China. The Trần dynasty of Đại Việt decided to accept the supremacy of the Yuan dynasty in order to avoid further conflicts. In 1289, Đại Việt released most of the Mongol prisoners of war to China, but Omar, whose return Kublai particularly demanded, was intentionally drowned when the boat transporting him was contrived to sink. In the winter of 1289–1290, King Trần Nhân Tông led an attack into modern-day Laos, against the advice of his advisors, with the goal of preventing raids from the inhabitants of the highlands. Famines and starvations ravaged the country from 1290 to 1292. There were no records of what caused the crop failures, but possible factors included neglect of the water control system due to the war, the mobilization of men away from the rice fields, and floods or drought. Although Đại Việt repelled the Yuan, the capital Thăng Long was razed, many Buddhist sites were decimated, and the Vietnamese suffered major losses in population and property. Nhân Tông rebuilt the Thăng Long citadel in 1291 and 1293.

In 1293, Kublai detained the Vietnamese envoy, Đào Tử Kí, because Trần Nhân Tông refused to go to Khanbaliq in person. Kublai's successor Temür Khan (r.1294-1307), later released all detained envoys and resumed their tributary relationship initially established after the first invasion, which continued to the end of the Yuan.

=== Champa ===
The Champa Kingdom decided to accept the supremacy of the Yuan dynasty and also established a tributary relationship with the Yuan. Afterwards, Champa was never mentioned in the History of Yuan again as a target for the Mongols. In 1305, Cham King Chế Mân (r. 1288 – 1307) married the Vietnamese princess Huyền Trân (daughter of Trần Nhân Tông) as he ceded two provinces Ô and Lý to Đại Việt. What following next was a series of chronic Cham–Vietnamese fighting and major wars over the disputed control of ceded provinces for the rest of the 14th century.

=== Transmission of gunpowder ===
Before the 13th century, gunpowder in Vietnam was used in the form of firecrackers for entertainment. During the Mongol invasions, an influx of Chinese immigrants from the Southern Song fleeing to Southeast Asia brought gunpowder weapons with them, such as fire arrows and fire lances. The Vietnamese and the Cham developed these weapons further in the next century; when the Ming dynasty conquered Đại Việt in 1407, they found that the Vietnamese were skillful in making a type of fire lance that fires an arrow and a number of lead bullets as co-viative projectiles.

=== Legacy ===
Despite the military defeats suffered during the campaigns, they are often treated as a success by historians for the Mongols due to the establishment of tributary relations with Đại Việt and Champa. The initial Mongol goal of placing Đại Việt, a tributary state of the Southern Song dynasty, as their own tributary state was accomplished after the first invasion. However, the Mongols failed to impose their demands of greater tribute and direct darughachi oversight over Đại Việt's internal affairs during their second invasion and their goal of replacing the uncooperative Trần Nhân Tông with Trần Ích Tắc as the King of Đại Việt during the third invasion. Nonetheless, friendly relations were established and Dai Viet continued to pay tribute to the Mongol court.

Vietnamese historiography emphasizes the Vietnamese military victories. The three invasions, and the Battle of Bạch Đằng in particular, are remembered within Vietnam and Vietnamese historiography as prototypical examples of Vietnamese resistance against foreign aggression. Prince Trần Hưng Đạo is greatly remembered as a national hero who secured Vietnamese independence.

== See also ==
- Mongol invasions
- History of the Cham–Vietnamese wars
- Trần dynasty military tactics and organization
- Mongol military tactics and organization
