= Phạm Ngũ Lão =

Vietnamese military general (1255–1320)

Phạm Ngũ Lão 范五老
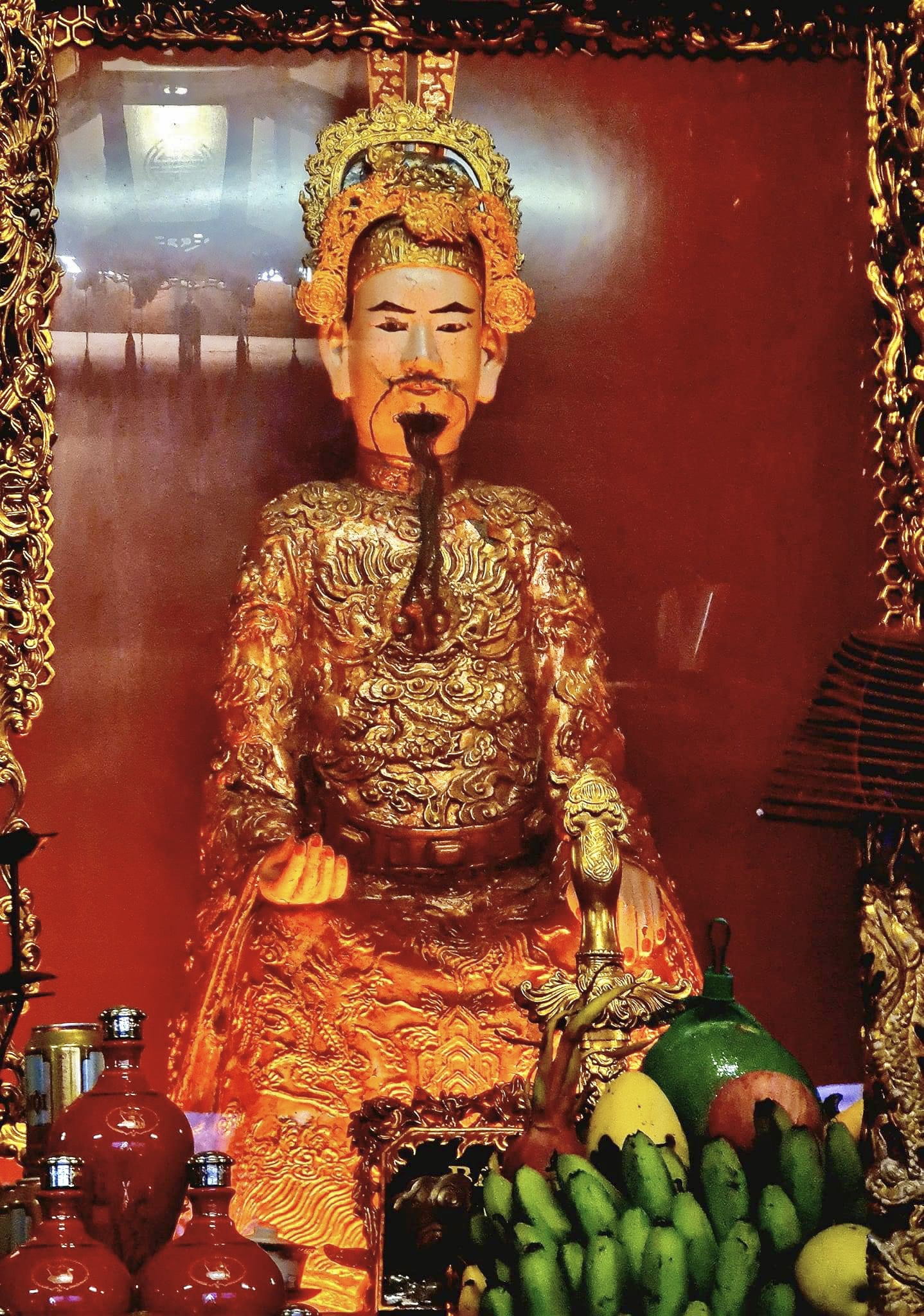
- Phạm Ngũ Lão statue at Kiếp Bạc Temple
- Born: 1255; Phù Ủng, Hải Dương, Đại Việt
- Died: 1320 (aged 64–65); Thăng Long, Đại Việt
- Burial: Hải Dương province
- Spouse: Princess Anh Nguyên
- House: Trần dynasty

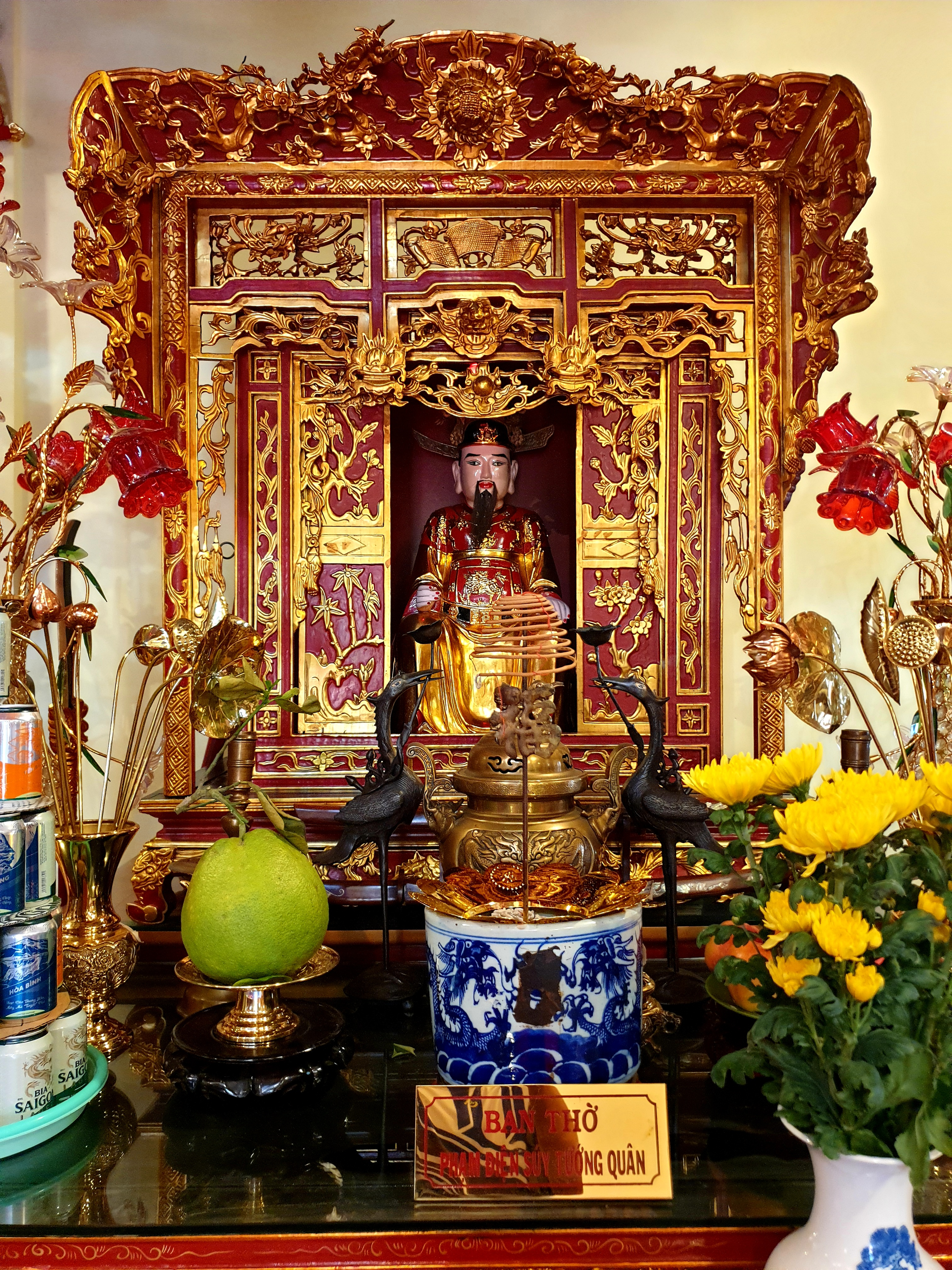
The altar of the general at Thánh Trần Temple, District 1

Phạm Ngũ Lão (范五老, 1255–1320) was a general of the Trần dynasty during the reigns of three successive emperors Nhân Tông, Anh Tông, and Minh Tông. His talent was noticed by Prince Hưng Đạo Trần Quốc Tuấn who married his adopted daughter to Phạm Ngũ Lão and recommended him for the royal court. Renowned as a prominent general in battlefield, Phạm Ngũ Lão was one of the few commanders of the Vietnamese army during the second and third Mongol invasion who did not come from the Trần clan. After the war of resistance against the Yuan dynasty, Phạm Ngũ Lão continued to participate in numerous military campaigns of the Trần dynasty in which he often succeeded. Today, Phạm Ngũ Lão is considered as one of the most capable military commanders of the Trần dynasty and within the history of Vietnamese commanders along Trần Hưng Đạo, revered as Đức Thánh Phạm.

== Background ==
- Phạm Ngũ Lão
- Vietnamese alphabet: Phạm Ngũ Lão
- Chữ Hán: 范五老

According to Đại Việt sử ký toàn thư, Phạm Ngũ Lão was born in 1255 in Phù Úng, Đường Hảo, Thượng Hồng (now Ân Thi, Hưng Yên). At the age of about 20 when his talent was noticed by Prince Hưng Đạo Trần Quốc Tuấn after sitting still whilst weaving a basket in the open road, not responding with anything other than "I am thinking about war." even after he was stabbed in the thigh. Prince Hưng Đạo was impressed and offered him a position in the military, who married his adopted daughter, Princess Anh Nguyên, to Phạm Ngũ Lão and also taught him about military knowledge so that he could become a capable general. After that, Prince Hưng Đạo recommended him for the Emperor Trần Nhân Tông who appointed him as commander of right division of the Royal Guard (Thánh dực quân) in May 1290.

== History ==
=== During two Mongol invasions ===
In 1279, the Yuan dynasty won a decisive victory over the Song dynasty in the Battle of Yamen which marked the end of the Song dynasty and the total control of Kublai Khan over China. As a result, Kublai Khan started planning the invasions of the southern countries like Đại Việt or Champa. In December 1284, the second Yuan's invasion of Đại Việt was initiated under the command of Kublai Khan's prince Toghan. Đại Việt invasion came in two directions, the infantry, led by Toghan, invaded from the northern border while general Sogetu led the navy from the southern border through Champa's territory. During the war, Phạm Ngũ Lão participated in several battles, notably Battle of Chương Dương where Phạm Ngũ Lão, together with Prince Chiêu Minh Trần Quang Khải and Marquis Hoài Văn Trần Quốc Toản, nearly destroyed general Sogetu's fleet on the tenth day of the fifth lunar month (June 14), or Battle of Vạn Kiếp where the general fought under the command of Prince Hưng Đạo Trần Quốc Tuấn on May 20. Đại Việt's decisive victories ultimately led to the retreat of Toghan's troops one month later.

In 1287, the Yuan dynasty launched their third invasion of Đại Việt. This military campaign was ended by a disastrous defeat of the Yuan navy in Battle of Bạch Đằng on March 8 of Lunar calendar, 1288. After fighting in Battle of Bạch Đằng, Phạm Ngũ Lão ambushed Prince Toghan's retreating troops, destroying half of the Yuan army. As a results of his battlefield achievements, Phạm Ngũ Lão was promoted to Commander of the Royal Guard after the war(Quản Thánh dực quân).

=== After the war ===
During the peaceful period afterwards, Phạm Ngũ Lão continued to have an important role in military activities of Đại Việt. In the military campaign in August 1294 led by the Retired Emperor Trần Nhân Tông in person, general Phạm Ngũ Lão was successful in relieving the troops of Prince Trung Thành trapped by Laotian force, he was awarded a golden badge by this deed of arms. In 1297, Phạm Ngũ Lão had another victory over the troops from Laos and was appointed as commander-in-chief (Hữu kim ngô vệ đại tướng quân) in October 1298. In this position, Phạm Ngũ Lão had continued success in several military campaigns in the western and southern border such as the Battle of Mường Mai against Laotian intruders in 1301 or the military campaign against kingdom of Champa in 1318. The general also took charge of putting down a revolt inside Đại Việt in 1302. With many victories in battle, Phạm Ngũ Lão was promoted gradually to Commander-In-Chief (Điện súy thượng tướng quân) of the Đại Việt army, the Emperor also married his daughter as royal concubine and granted a mandarin position for Phạm Ngũ Lão's son, a favour which was usually reserved only for members of royal family. Outside the royal court, Phạm Ngũ Lão was a close friend of Prince Minh Hiến Trần Uất, Trần Thái Tông's youngest prince, and was always ready to help the Prince despite the difference of class between him and Trần Uất.

In November 1320, Phạm Ngũ Lão died in Thăng Long at the age of 66. The Emperor Trần Minh Tông mourned his death by not appearing in court for 5 days, a special dedication for an official who did not come from Trần clan.

== Legacy ==
Phạm Ngũ Lão is considered one of the most able military commanders of the Dynastic times of Vietnam and within excellent commanders in Vietnamese history. Phạm Ngũ Lão's deeds in the victories over two Mongols invasions and the period of peace and prosperity afterwards made him one of the most prominent figures of the Trần dynasty who did not come from Trần clan. Phạm Ngũ Lão was also a poet with several famous poems such as Thuật hoài. Nowadays, many cities in Vietnam, have named major streets after him, a main street in Hanoi where the National Museum of Vietnamese History is located. In Ho Chi Minh City, a street and a ward where the street runs along in District 1 was named after him, the area is usually known as the "Backpacker Quarter" with many bustling shops, the city also has an other street named after him in Gò Vấp district, where the Southern National Funeral Home of the Ministry of National Defence's Military Hospital 175; and many places in Vietnam are named in honour of Phạm Ngũ Lão. He is still worshipped as a deity, Saint Phạm (Đức thánh Phạm) in several regions of Vietnam, and each year a traditional festival is held in Phù Úng, his native village, to commemorate the feats of Phạm Ngũ Lão.
