= Thuật hoài =

Poem

Thuật hoài (literally: Express) is one of two poems which are still exist of Phạm Ngũ Lão (1255-1320), a famous general of Trần dynasty.

== Introduction ==
This is a seven-word four-line poem (Vietnamese: thất ngôn tứ tuyệt) written by Hán word. Its composition time is not known.

橫 槊 江 山 恰 幾 秋
Hoành sóc giang sơn kháp kỷ thu,
Kept the spear transversely in homeland for many years,

三 軍 貔 虎 氣 吞 牛
Tam quân tì hổ khí thôn ngưu.
Three Squad is as tough as tiger and leopard, Ch'i is strong enough to gulp a buffalo (or Ch'i is so strong that can overwhelm Taurus constellation).

男 兒 未 了 功 名 債
Nam nhi vị liễu công danh trái,
As a man who did not pay honor doubt,

羞 聽 人 間 說 武侯
Tu thính nhân gian thuyết Vũ hầu.
Then he will be ashamed to hear about Zhuge.
