= Lê Phụ Trần =

Lê Phụ Trần 黎輔陳
- Born: Thanglong, Đại Việt
- Died: Đại Việt
- Spouse: Princess Chiêu Thánh
- Issue: Marquis Lê Tông; Princess Ứng Thụy Lê Khuê
Names
- Lê Tần (黎秦)
- House: Trần dynasty

Lê Phụ Trần (?–?) was a general of the Trần dynasty during the reigns of three successive emperors: Thái Tông, Thánh Tông, and Nhân Tông. (Note: "Relying upon the counsel and battlefield prowess of Le Phu Tran and others, Tran Canh rallied his men and returned to the offensive, attacking and pushing back the Mongol force at Thang Long.")

As a skilled general on the battlefield, he was one of the few commanders of the Trần dynasty army during the three Mongol invasions of Đại Việt who did not come from the Trần clan. Besides his military activities, Lê Phụ Trần also took charge of the position royal professor for crown prince Trần Khâm who eventually became the Emperor Trần Nhân Tông. For his merits, the Emperor Trần Thái Tông (Trần Cảnh) decided to grant Lê Phụ Trần a marriage with the former empress (i.e., Trần Cảnh's former wife) Lý Chiêu Hoàng.

== History ==
There was only a brief account about Lê Phụ Trần (Lê who serves the Trần dynasty) in historical books as the exact dates of his birth and death were unknown. It was said that his former name was Lê Tần (黎秦) and that he was of Ái Châu origin. According to Đại Việt sử kí toàn thư, Lê Phụ Trần was appointed by the Emperor Trần Thái Tông as middle-ranking court counsellor (Vietnamese: Ngự sử trung tướng) in 1250.

In 1257, the Trần dynasty had to face with the first Mongol invasion of Đại Việt. In the beginning, the Đại Việt army suffered several defeats by an overwhelming force which had already conquered vast areas of Asia. Several high-ranking officials of the Trần dynasty were so afraid that Prince Khâm Thiên Trần Nhật Hiệu, younger brother of Thái Tông, even suggested the Emperor that they might escape from Đại Việt to the Song dynasty. Despite the hardships, Lê Phụ Trần always proved to be not only a courageous general on the battlefield but also a sound official who rightly advised the Emperor retreating in order to preserve the army for a counterattack. It was Lê Phụ Trần who fiercely protected the Emperor from the Mongol army in this retreat, hence he became a close advisor of the Emperor who could discuss with Thái Tông the most important and secret matters about the war. Finally, the Trần dynasty was able to drive back the invasion and re-established the peace in Đại Việt in December 1257.

For his merits during the war of resistance, in 1258 the Emperor Trần Thái Tông decided to grant Lê Phụ Trần a marriage with the former empress Lý Chiêu Hoàng who was downgraded to princess Chiêu Thánh after the 1237 event in which Lý Chiêu Hoàng was forced by grand chancellor Trần Thủ Độ to give up the position of Empress Consort of the Trần dynasty for her elder sister Thuận Thiên, for the reason that she could not give birth to a child for Trần Thái Tông. Like the 1237 event, the marriage between Lê Phụ Trần and Princess Chiêu Thánh was criticized in historical books for the lack of moral code in marriage during the Early Trần period. Princess Chiêu Thánh deceased in Cổ Pháp (Note: In 2009, "residents in the northern province of Bac Ninh were furious at the local authorities who demolished a 700-year-old shrine to Empress Ly Chieu Hoang under plans to 'restore' the historic site.") in March 1278 at the age of 61. With the second husband Lê Phụ Trần, she had two children, Marquis Lê Tông and Princess Ứng Thụy Lê Khuê.

Right after the marriage, Trần Thái Tông chose Lê Phụ Trần and Chu Bác Lãm as the Emperor's envoys to the Yuan dynasty in 1258. In this voyage, Chief Ambassador Lê Phụ Trần was able to negotiate with the Yuan dynasty for a 3-year period of paying tribute instead of the confused demand of tribute from the Yuan dynasty before. After the coronation of Trần Thánh Tông in February 1258, Lê Phụ Trần was promoted to commander-in-chief of Đại Việt's navy (Thủy quân đại tướng quân) in June 1259 as a part of the Emperor's plan of reinforcing the Trần dynasty by several recruitements and reorganization of the military division so that the operating and fighting ability of Đại Việt army could be improved.

Besides his military activities, Lê Phụ Trần was also a renowned scholar, in 1274, Trần Thánh Tông appointed him for the position of royal professor (Trừ cung giáo thụ) for crown prince Trần Khâm, who eventually became the Emperor Trần Nhân Tông, with two famous scholars Nguyễn Sĩ Cố and Nguyễn Thánh Huấn as assistants.
