= Quách Bốc =

Quách Bốc (郭卜, ?-?) was a Vietnamese general during the Lý dynasty. He led a revolt that ousted emperor Lý Cao Tông in 1209.

== Uprising ==
=== Cause ===
As a subordinate of Phạm Bỉnh Di, just after being informed that Bỉnh Di was killed, Quách Bốc led his army battering the Đại Thanh Gate of the citadel down to save his governor. Two brothers, Phạm Du and Phạm Kinh, killed both Bỉnh Di and his son and then escaped out of the citadel with Cao Tông.

=== Occupying citadel ===
Quách Bốc occupied the citadel and subsequently enthroned the young prince Lý Thẩm. Cao Tông fled to Tam Nông, Phú Thọ and lodged at the residence of Hà Vạn, who was a minority leader holding a potential force. The Crown Prince Sảm, who later became the succeeding king Lý Huệ Tông, fled to Hải Ấp, Thái Bình with his mother, Noble Consort Đoàn and his two younger sisters. Sảm lodged at the residence of Trần Lý, who was the grandfather of Trần Cảnh, the future founder of the Trần dynasty. Sảm married Trần Thị Dung, who was Trần Lý's daughter. Then he conferred the title Minh Tự on Trần Lý and the title Commander of Anterior Citadel (a title also held by Lý Thái Tổ during the time he was an official of Lý Dynasty) on the brother-in-law of Trần Lý named Tô Trung Từ. They recruited soldiers from the surrounding and managed to initiate a conflict against Quách Bốc.

Informed that Lý Sảm had established his own court and arbitrarily conferred titles on various individuals, Cao Tông was annoyed and wanted to suppress his military power. He sent Phạm Du to associate with Đoàn Thượng, but Du intrigued with the Princess Thiên Cực and missed the meeting with Đoàn Thượng. When fulfilling another meeting, and crossing over Ma Lãng, he was killed by the army of the landlord of Bắc Giang.

=== Unknown fate ===
Trần Lý and Tô Trung Tự led their army back to the capital to defeat Quách Bốc. At the end of 1209, the rebellion was suppressed, Trần Lý was killed in the battle, and Tô Trung Từ sent an army to bring Cao Tông back. Because Phạm Du died and Tô Trung Từ held almost total power over the court, Cao Tông had to lean toward him. Đàm Dĩ Mông although quisling with Quách Bốc when he occupied the citadel but eventually was accepted to be the Thái úy – a rather high official.

There are no documents indicating the endings of the lives of Quách Bốc and Lý Thầm.
