= Trần Tự Khánh =

- Marquis Chương Thành
- Born: 1175; Lưu Gia village, Đại Việt
- Died: 3 January 1224 (aged 48–49); Thăng Long, Đại Việt
- House: Lý dynasty
- Father: Trần Lý

Marquis Chương Thành Trần Tự Khánh (1175 – 3 January 1224) was a general of the Lý dynasty during the reigns of Lý Cao Tông and Lý Huệ Tông. He was son of Trần Lý, head of the Trần clan, and brother of Trần Thừa and Trần Thị Dung who married to Lý Huệ Tông. Renowned as a skilled general, Trần Tự Khánh was one of the most prominent figures during the turbulent time at the end of Cao Tông and the beginning of Huệ Tông's rule. He had many victories on the battlefield and was responsible for putting down several revolts against the Lý dynasty. Although He died before the coronation of his nephew Trần Thái Tông, Trần Tự Khánh was considered one of the main factors that led to the rising position of the Trần clan in the royal court and ultimately the overthrowing of the Lý dynasty by Trần Thủ Độ to create the Trần dynasty.

== Background ==
Trần Tự Khánh

Vietnamese name
- Vietnamese: Trần Tự Khánh
- Hán-Nôm: 陳嗣慶

Trần Tự Khánh was born as the second son of Trần Lý who made his great fortune by fishing in Lưu Gia village (now Hưng Hà, Thái Bình). He had a younger brother Trần Thừa, who fathered the future first emperor of Trần dynasty Trần Thái Tông, and a younger sister Trần Thị Dung. During the troubled time under the reign of Lý Cao Tông, the Crown Prince Lý Sảm sought refuge in Trần Lý's family and decided to marry his beautiful daughter Trần Thị Dung in 1209.

== History ==
In March 1210 Trần Tự Khánh with his army of Trần's house servants helped the Crown Prince return to the capital, Thăng Long; therefore he was awarded the title Count Thuận Lưu (Vietnamese: Thuận Lưu bá). One year after, the Crown Prince Lý Sảm was enthroned as Lý Huệ Tông after the death of Lý Cao Tông, by then the Trần clan's position began to rise in the royal court. After his coronation, Huệ Tông ordered Trần Tự Khánh to bring his sister to royal palace, the mission was successfully conducted by Trần Tự Khánh's subordinate Phùng Tá Chu who also helped general Tô Trung Từ pacify the revolt of Đỗ Quảng near Thăng Long. As a result, Tô Trung Từ was promoted to Regent of the Emperor while Trần Tự Khánh was also granted the title Marquis Chương Thành (Chương Thành hầu).

Besides the revolt of Đỗ Quảng, there were many warlords who rose up their troops against the rule of the Lý dynasty. One of them, Đoàn Thượng, even self-entitled as Prince (Vương) and was so powerful that no generals of the Emperor could put down his revolt. These revolts with the incapability of the royal court made the ruling Lý dynasty gradually weaken. In February 1213, afraid that his sister was ill-treated by the Empress Mother Đàm, Trần Tự Khánh led his army to the royal palace with the petition of receiving the Emperor, Trần Tự Khánh's action made Lý Huệ Tông suspected that he in fact wanted to overpower the Emperor, Huệ Tông thus ordered an issue of imprisoning Trần Tự Khánh and downgrading his sister Trần Thị Dung from Royal Consort (nguyên phi) to palace maid (ngự nữ). The imprisonment of Trần Tự Khánh was not carried out and he again brought troops near Thăng Long in January 1214 with the same petition. Afraid that Trần Tự Khánh had a conspiracy against the royal family, Lý Huệ Tông decided to escape from Thăng Long to Lạng Sơn, always with the pursuit of Trần Tự Khánh. Only after Trần Tự Khánh put down the revolt of Đinh Khả and Bùi Đô in May 1214, the Emperor restored his sister as Lady Thuận Trinh (Thuận Trinh phu nhân). However, she was still distrusted by the Empress Mother Đàm who tried to force Trần Thị Dung commit suicide several times and finally Lý Huệ Tông had to escape with Lady Thuận Trinh to the garrison of Trần Tự Khánh in Cửu Liên Marsh (now Yên Mỹ, Hưng Yên). The first child of Huệ Tông and Lady Thuận Trinh, Princess Thuận Thiên was born here in June 1216.

In December 1216 Lady Thuận Trinh was entitled as empress of the Lý dynasty, hence Trần Tự Khánh was appointed for the position of Regent of the Emperor and commander in charge of military training and preparing. Being a skilled general, Trần Tự Khánh was able to improve the military situation of the Lý dynasty's army. During that time, Huệ Tông's health declined rapidly and so the power in the royal court was gradually fallen into the hand of the Trần clan led by Trần Tự Khánh. Outside the royal palace, Đại Việt was still in a chaotic situation by the revolts Nguyễn Nộn, Đoàn Thượng, and mountainous people in Chương Mỹ. After his failure of pacifying the revolt in Chương Mỹ, Trần Tự Khánh advised the Emperor to pardon Nguyễn Nộn and appoint him to take charge of putting down the Chương Mỹ's revolt.

Trần Tự Khánh died in December 1223 and was posthumously entitled as Prince Kiến Quốc (Kiến Quốc đại vương). Although unable to witness the successful plot to overthrow the Lý dynasty and found Trần dynasty by his cousin Trần Thủ Độ in 1225, Trần Tự Khánh was still considered as one of the main figures that led to the collapse of the Lý dynasty and the creation of the Trần dynasty.
