= Tô Trung Từ =

Vietnamese general

Tô Trung Từ (chữ Hán: 蘇忠詞, ?–1211) was a high ranking general near the end of the Lý dynasty in the History of Vietnam, and attempted to usurp the Lý dynasty during his reign of the dynasty's royal court. He was born in Lưu Gia village in Thái Bình province.

== History ==
=== Assisting the Lý Prince ===
Not much is known about Tô Trung Từ's past, other than that he is the brother-in-law of Trần Lý, who married his sister Tô Phu Nhân, and that he was a relative of Tô Hiến Thành, who was one of the most prominent mandarins at the time during the Lý dynasty. He was also the uncle of several prominent members of the Trần clan, such as the Marquis Trần Tự Khánh, Trần Thị Dung who was the last empress of the Lý dynasty and Trần Thừa who was the head of the Trần clan and whose son, Trần Cảnh would later become the first emperor of the Trần Dynasty. Prior to the incident of Quách Bốc's rebellion, where general Quách Bốc ousted the emperor Lý Cao Tông in 1209, which marked the beginning of the downfall of the Lý dynasty, Tô Trung Từ was a mandarin in the royal court and was acquainted with the emperor Lý Cao Tông and his son Lý Huệ Tông, also known by his birth name Lý Sảm, the penultimate ruler of the Lý dynasty.

The reign of Emperor Lý Cao Tông was a time of chaos, confusion and discord, arousing much discontent from the general populace. Then, in 1209, Emperor Cao Tông was suggested by Vietnamese official Phạm Du to kill Phạm Bỉnh Di, who was a rival official of Phạm Du. Emperor Cao Tông took Du's advice and ordered the killing of Bỉnh Di. Quách Bốc, who was a general under Bỉnh Di went to avenge his master as a result and thus attacked the capital, temporarily installing Lý Thầm as the emperor. As a result, Emperor Cao Tông fled to Quy Hoá, while prince Lý Sảm, his mother and his two younger sisters fled to Hải Ấp in Thái Bình province, which was under Trần Lý's governance.

Listening to the advice of Phạm Ngu, Trần Lý and Tô Trung Từ went to meet Prince Sảm to discuss the matter of making Lý Thầm the king. Prince Sảm then returned to the village of Lưu Gia, Tô Trung Từ's native town, where he then met the daughter of Trần Lý, Trần Thị Dung, and upon being mesmerized by her beauty, took her as his wife. Afterwards, Trần Lý was appointed to the title of "Minh Tự", Phạm Ngu was appointed as the minister of justice and Tô Trung Từ as the Commander of Anterior Citadel.

After hearing the news that Prince Sảm had established his own court with Trần Lý, Tô Trung Từ and Phạm Ngu, Emperor Lý Cao Tông, still residing in Quy Hoá, decided to send Phạm Du as a messenger to contact Sảm and his court, alongside the Đoàn brothers (Đoàn Thượng, Đoàn Văn Lôi). However, Phạm Du, who was in a relationship with the princess Thiên Cực would miss the arranged meeting, leaving only the Đoàn's to arrive. When Du went on the boat to meet the Đoàn's, he was ambushed as he arrived towards Ma Lãng and was captured and killed by Nguyễn Nậu and Nguyễn Nải, the leaders of Bắc Giang, alongside their army.

At around that time, Trần Lý and Tô Trung Từ brought forth their army and crushed the rebellion of Quách Bốc in order to work with the Lý royalty. At the end of 1209, the rebellion of Quách Bốc was flattened, but Trần Lý was killed during the battle. Tô Trung Từ, having survived and successfully crushing the rebellion, was welcomed to Emperor Cao Tông's palace for a meeting. Because Phạm Du was now dead, and due to Trung Từ's increasing influence, Cao Tông was now forced to increasingly rely on Trung Từ.

=== Seizing control over the Lý Dynasty ===
==== Ascension within the Royal Court ====
Tô Trung Từ escorted Emperor Cao Tông to the capital city while Prince Sảm was still at Hải Ấp along with Trần Lý's son's Trần Thừa and Trần Tự Khánh, due to Quách Bốc's prior rebellion. At this point, Trung Từ wanted to seize all the power to himself, so he first decided to separate Prince Lý Sảm away from the Trần sons.

At the beginning of 1210, King Cao Tông fell seriously ill, so the king wanted to welcome his son Prince Sảm to the throne. At this point, Tô Trung Từ staged a fake attack using a pretentious army in order to quell the supposed rebels at Khoái Châu, only to come to Hải Ấp to seize the prince. Not long afterwards, Cao Tông sent his officer Đỗ Quảng to come and pick up Prince Sảm.

At the end of 1210, Emperor Lý Cao Tông finally succumbed and died from his illness, but before dying, he commissioned Master Đỗ Kính Tu to look after Prince Sảm. Lý Sảm then ascended to the throne after his father's death and took on the title of Lý Huệ Tông, but to much surprise, it was not Đỗ Kính Tu but Tô Trung Từ instead who had become the ruler of the court and thus was the closest one to the now emperor Huệ Tông.

After ascending to the throne, Huệ Tông asked that Trần Thị Dung be his wife, but her brother, Trần Tự Khánh did not consent. By this time, Tô Trung Từ had won over the emperor away from the Trần clan should any contradictions or disputes arise with Tự Khánh.

==== Rise to Power in Lý Dynasty ====
At this point, Emperor Huệ Tông, now seeing that Trung Từ had seized considerable power within the court, decided to send his officer Đỗ Kính Tu to seek out and battle him.

In December 1210, the Empress along with Đỗ Quảng's group captured Kính Tu and handed him over to Trung Từ. Kính Tu was later drowned by Trung Từ and was found dead near Đại Thông.

Afterwards, the ranking officers of the Lý dynasty continued to plot against the usurper Tô Trung Từ. Shortly thereafter, Trung Từ heard of news from his officers that Đỗ Thế Quy, Phí Liệt, and Đỗ Quảng were planning to dispatch their troops to fight against him, so he set out his forces to take down those people first. However, before he was about to launch his attack, Trung Từ realized that his army was smaller than Đỗ Quảng's and Phí Liệt's, who had too many soldiers for his forces to handle. Trung Từ thus changed his plans and tried to find a way to deceive the Lý generals in order to buy time to increase the size of his army.

Trung Từ then sent a messenger to generals Đỗ Quảng and Phí Liệt, saying that:

"The king has now died, the people are still in grief, why not retreat your soldiers, and then return to the dynasty to consider the plan of joining forces to assist the seventh king, is that not good?"

Đỗ Quảng and Phí Liệt agreed to the plan and to meet with Trung Từ. Since that day was an afternoon, they planned to meet the following morning instead. That night however, Tô Trung Từ began to increase his troops more than the day before in preparation to attack and take out Quảng and Liệt.

The following day, Đỗ Quảng and Phí Liệt arrived and waited for the arrival of general Trung Từ. Unbeknownst to them however, Trung Từ had secretly came first to Tứ Đạt and ordered his general Đào Phán to maneuver his army to the right side and build a place for the soldiers to reside in at Sa Trì and Long Trì, while general Nguyễn Tự and his son-in-law Nguyễn Ma La were stationed at the troops stronghold, Thiên Thu.

At that time, while Quảng and Liệt were eating, Liệt heard from Cao Kha that Tô Trung Từ had been gathering his soldiers in preparation for an attack; Cao Kha had seen the soldiers throw chopsticks and threateningly raise their weapons as they arrived at Long môn, and he saw Đào Phán's troops beating their drums and yelling provokingly, signifying aggression. General Quảng and Liệt were able to drive off Đào Phán and his forces; Đào fled away after battle to Thiên Thu gate in order to escape Quảng and Liệt.

Đào Phán then, along with his troops, attacked Đỗ Thế Quy. Thế Quy then ran off and hid under the tomb of the now deceased Emperor Cao Tông. Tô Trung Từ then came to the scene and was able to capture Thế Quy, where he then proceeded to order the execution of Thế Quy at chợ Đông.

Upon hearing the news of Emperor Cao Tông's death, Trần Tự Khánh brought forth his troops to Tế Giang (Mỹ Văn, Hưng Yên) and asked for Tô Trung Từ to attend the Emperor's funeral, but Trung Từ refused, fearing that Trần Tự would burn down the citadel. Trần Tự thus was forced to draw his forces back to Thuận Lưu.

In early 1211, Emperor Huệ Tông sent a person to pick up Trần Thị Dung. This time, Tự Khánh agreed to send his sister to the court and ordered two military commanders Phan Lân and Nguyễn Ngạnh to act as military escorts. When the troops escorted to Thăng Long, it was time for Trung Từ to clash with Đỗ Quảng's troops. Trung Từ and his two generals Phan and Nguyễn were able to destroy Quảng's army. The following month, Quảng was captured and beaten by Từ's forces.

== Downfall and Death ==
Though Trung Từ succeeded in disposing of the former royalties of the Lý dynasty, his internal insight was doubtful. His "Bộ tướng", or lower ranked general Nguyễn Tự wanted to dispose of his son-in-law, Nguyễn Ma La and tried to betray Trung Từ, which Tô Trung later found out when one of Nguyễn Tự's lower generals reported this news to him. In response, Từ stripped Nguyễn Tự of his military position. Tự later fled away to Quốc Oai where he later ruled as a feudal lord.

Things continued to deteriorate for Trung Từ; he became fascinated by the beauty of the princess Thiên Cực, who was the wife of the Minister Vương Thượng and who had previously had a former relationship with the then deceased Phạm Du, who had been previously killed by an ambush in Ma Lãng. One night, on June 6, 1211, Tô Trung Từ went to Gia Lâm alongside the princess Thiên Cực, where he was then arrested in an ambush by Vương Thượng and was beaten to death thereafter. According to the Lý dynasty law, if a man and woman were caught cheating, the husband could kill the rival without being found guilty of a crime.

Soon after Trung Từ's death, the city fell into chaos. His son-in-law, Nguyễn Ma La saw his father-in-law being murdered, so he started to plot with the Trần family; Ma La later asked Tự Khánh to use his soldiers in order to quell the chaos within the city. Later, Ma La, along with his wife Tô thị (the younger cousin of Trần Tự Khánh) boarded a boat headed towards Thuận Lưu to meet with one of Tô Trung Từ's generals, Nguyễn Trinh, but Trinh then killed Nguyễn Ma La and had also toke Tô thị. Tô thị ordered somebody to accuse Trần Thừa of masterminding the plot. Trần Thừa thus ordered Tô thị to seduce and kill Trinh, dealing a devastating blow to Trung Từ's forces. Soon afterwards, Tô Trung Từ's forces fell into complete disintegration as a result.

While Ma La's body was being pulled out by the troops, and as the entire city vacated, Tự Khánh returned the troops back to the capital and then later had a funeral for Tô Trung Từ in Hoạch village. After that, the fighting and hostilities between the warlords grew fiercer until finally Trần Tự Khánh was able to defeat the former Lý dynasty and took control of the Lý dynasty afterwards.

== Legacy ==
Tô Trung Từ's rise to power and downfall in the Lý dynasty draws many parallels with and is often compared to the rise and fall of Dong Zhuo in Chinese history; both seized the opportunity of chaos and turmoil within their respective countries in order to seize power, such as the Lý dynasty in Trung Từ's case and Dong Zhuo with the Eastern Han dynasty. Both managed to defeat a number of generals and officers who conspired against them, and in both cases, both of their downfalls can be attributed to a woman that they ended up losing their lives for; Princess Thiên Cực in Tô Trung Từ's case and Diaochan in the case of Dong Zhuo.
