= Lý Cao Tông =

Lý Cao Tông 李高宗
- Emperor of Đại Việt

Emperor of Đại Việt
- Reign: 14 August 1175–15 November 1210
- Predecessor: Lý Anh Tông
- Successor: Lý Huệ Tông

Emperor of the Lý dynasty
- Reign: 14 August 1175–15 November 1210
- Predecessor: Lý Anh Tông
- Successor: Lý Huệ Tông
- Born: 6 July 1173; Thăng Long
- Died: 15 November 1210 (aged 37); Thánh Thọ palace (瑞光殿), Thăng Long
- Burial: Thọ Tomb
- Spouse: Empress An Toàn
- Issue: Lý Hạo Sảm as emperor Lý Huệ Tông; Lý Thầm
Names
- Lý Long Trát or Lý Long Cán (李龍翰)
Era dates
- Trinh Phù (貞符, 1176–1185); Thiên Tư Gia Thụy (天資嘉瑞, 1186–1201); Thiên Gia Bảo Hựu (天嘉寶祐, 1202–1204); Trị Bình Long Ứng (治平龍應, 1205–1210).
Regnal name
- Ứng Thiên Ngự Cực Hoành Văn Hiến Vũ Linh Thiệu Chiếu Phù Chương Đạo Chí Nhân Ái Dân Lý Vật Duệ Mưu Thần Trí Cảm Hóa Cảm Chánh Thuần Phu Huệ Thị Từ Tuy Du Kiến Mỹ Công Toàn Nghiệp Thịnh Long Hiện Thần Cư Thánh Minh Quang Hiếu Hoàng Đế 應乾御極宏文憲武靈瑞照符彰道至仁愛民理物睿謀神智化感政醇敷惠示慈綏猷建美功全業盛龍見神居聖明光孝皇帝
Temple name
- Cao Tông (高宗)
- House: Lý
- Father: Lý Anh Tông
- Mother: Đỗ Thụy Châu
- Religion: Buddhism

Lý Cao Tông (6 July 1173 – 15 November 1210), born Lý Long Trát, courtesy name Long Cán, was the seventh emperor of the Lý dynasty, ruled Đại Việt for 35 years. He was enthroned at just three years old and was assisted by the loyal and capable officials such as Tô Hiến Thành, Ngô Lý Tín, which ensured the stability during the early years of his reign. However, when growing up and officially governing, Cao Tông proved to be a hedonistic tyrant. His reign was marked by debauchery, nationwide corruption, legal disorder, harsh forced labor and widespread uprising. His reign entered the irreversible crisis which ultimately led to the fall of the Lý dynasty and the establishment of the Trần dynasty fifteen years after his death.

== Early life ==
He was born Lý Long Cán (or Trát) on May 25, 1173, according to the Eastern calendar, in the Thăng Long Imperial Palace and was the sixth son of Lý Anh Tông. His mother was Đỗ Thụy Châu who later became Empress Dowager Đỗ. He was enthroned when he was very young, at the age of three, as one of the youngest Emperors in Vietnam's history. Prior to this, his predecessor Emperor Lý Anh Tông disposed the former Crown Prince Long Xưởng and replaced Prince Cán with this title. Tô Hiến Thành was trusted to become the regent to help the young Emperor run the court and administer his nation. It is often noted that his age and inexperience proved to be a minimal disadvantage in his ability to govern.

== Regent Tô Hiến Thành ==
Tô Hiến Thành was considered a talent and competent official when he was conferred the title Regent. After the death of Anh Tông, his uppermost consort (now became Empress Dowager Chiêu Linh, who died in 1200) wanted to dethrone her son Long Xưởng, who was the former Crown Prince. But thanks to Tô Hiến Thành's peremptoriness, Cán eventually became the successor of the throne.

Tô Hiến Thành fell ill not long after. At death's door, he recommended Empress Dowager Đỗ an official named Trần Trung Tá. She said a good word for his recommendation but it was merely something to please the dying people. After he died in 1179, she chose Đỗ An Di to become the Regent for her son.

In 1181, Lý Long Xưởng led his army in a mutiny and looted the capital. One year later, Empress Dowager Đỗ appointed Lý Kính Tu to teach her son. He was a capable official tutoring the young emperor in literature and morality. Thereafter, Empress Dowager Chiêu Linh and his son gave up the plot to mutiny.

== Epicurean Emperor ==
The king was meek and lenient while young, but after he grew and directly administered his reign, he became more and more cruel and sent the nation into turmoil. He loved to hunt and built himself large palaces at his people's expense. The codes and rules of his reign were obscure and immoral, leading the people to conflict with the local administration and rebel from the injustice and drudgery. At worst, they devastated buildings and looted villages.

In March 1189, Cao Tông took a trip around the nation and built pagoda or temples wherever a deity or spirit was said to reside. Nine years later, he built Nghênh Thiềm palace. The apex of his indulgence was in 1203, when he had numerous palaces built. By 1208, there were multiple famines and many people died of starvation. Despite the state of his country, the Emperor continued to indulge in pleasure and personal building projects.

An official named Cao Đường Long observed a strange-bird nesting on the roof of the unfinished palace Kính Thiên (means Respecting the Heaven) and predicted that a new and more powerful dynasty would soon supersede the current dynasty. He advised the Emperor to stop the injurious building projects, but the Emperor ignored him and instead listened to a eunuch named Phạm Bỉnh Di. The Emperor also ignored the looting and robberies outside the citadel.

== Turbulent era ==
=== Unrest ===
At that time, the affairs of the state were abandoned. Civil belief was replaced by disgust. Many revolts and secessions exploded amongst the peasantry and small local nobles. The court tried to suppress the rebellions, but it was to no actual effect.

In 1192, the civilians from Cổ Hoằng, Thanh Hóa rioted. The rebellions of Câu Diễn and Đinh Khả followed in 1198, who professed to be the descendants of Đinh Tiên Hoàng.

In August 1203, the king of Champa, Vidyanandana, entered Cửa Lò seeking asylum from a Khmer invasion. Vidyanandana killed the governor of Nghệ An, Pham Gieng. Vidyanandana then fled, never to be heard from again.

There was a potent force rebelling in September 1203 under the leading of two people from Đại Hoàng River. Many years ago they had accused Đàm Dĩ Mông of bleeding monetary and civil property. They used the turbulent society and lack of a central power to establish a force to oppose the court. All generals sent to suppress them failed. The first generals were Trần Lệnh Hinh and Từ Anh Nhữ, a minister, who were both killed, and the last general was Đỗ Kính Tu.

In 1207, in the mountainous area of Tản Viên (now Hà Tây ) there has a revolt of some minorities, which was quite prestigious.

In addition to the internal conflict and constant hunger during this time, the Song dynasty invaded with their Northern Army and the Vietnamese living in the areas tried to flee.

=== The shifty official Phạm Du ===
March 1207, two squires in Hồng Châu area (now Hải Dương and Hải Phòng) Đoàn Thượng and Đoàn Chủ rioted, built fortifications, and conferred the title Lord on themselves. Đoàn Thượng once was Cao Tông's general and also shared the same nursemaid with him. When the nation descended into chaos, the emperor ordered Đoàn Thượng to recruit troops in Hồng Châu to suppress bandits. Đoàn Thượng took advantages of that to build up his own army, then turned against the royal court and caused terror among the local populace. Upon returning to the royal court, he was impeached by other mandarins, who requested that he be imprisoned. Infuriated by this, Đoàn Thượng drew his sword to intimidate those present, then stripped naked and caused chaos at the royal court. He then fled the court for Hồng Châu, gathered thugs to plunder the local populace, built up a fortress, and proclaimed himself a lord, ruling as a warlord in defiance of the royal court.

Cao Tông dispatched a great number of soldiers, dividing them on some corps to suppress the rebellion. There were 4 main corps from 4 directions: the Đại Thông corps of Đàm Dĩ Mông, the Khả Liễu corps of Phạm Bỉnh Di, the Phù Đái corps of Trần Hinh, the Nam Sách corps of Bảo Trinh; they all would assemble to suppress Đoàn Thượng's army. Recognizing that confronting Du with such a large army would kill them all, Thượng bribed Du with costly furniture and willingly followed him, establishing a coalition between Du and Thượng. Thanks to Du's efforts to implore Cao Tông for forgiving Thượng, Thượng saved his neck.

Du went to Nghệ An to manage the army in 1209. This province underwent a catastrophic starvation whereby a large number of people died of hunger. The survivors left their homes and wandered, penniless. Most of them became beggars. Hence Phạm Du told the king that: "The society now is chaotic, and the pillaging and the rebellions are uncontrolled. Please allow me to recruit soldier for establishing a self-defense army ...."

Cao Tông agreed with him. Du recruited the local people to blockade the transport system, both on land and water. Cao Tông now identified his army as rebellious and sent Phạm Bỉnh Di with an army from Đằng Châu Hưng Yên to conquer him. Du retreated to Cổ Miệt and united with the army of Đoàn Thương and Đoàn Chủ from Hồng Châu. Pham Bỉnh Di was defeated in Đằng Châu. In February 1209, Bỉnh Di fought again with an army from Đằng Châu and Khoái Châu and defeated Du, who fled in retreat. He confiscated all of Du's property and set it on fire. As a result, Phạm Du grew even more resentful of Bỉnh Di.

Đoàn Thượng's army was overthrown in April 1209. Phạm Du bribed high-ranking officials in the capital and accused Bỉnh Di of a ferocious massacre. Cao Tông allowed Trần Hinh to convoke Phạm Du to come to the court and also called Bỉnh Di back. Phạm Du returned to the capital first and told the king false rumors about Bỉnh Di. When Bỉnh Di arrived, Cao Tông sent both him and his son to prison.

=== General Quách Bốc ===
After being told of Bỉnh Di's imprisonment, one of his subordinates named Quách Bốc led his army to the Đại Thanh Gate of the citadel and overthrew it to save *. . Phạm Du and Phạm Kinh killed Bỉnh Di and his son and then escaped the citadel with Cao Tông.

Quách Bốc occupied the citadel and enthroned the young prince Lý Thầm. Cao Tông fled to Tam Nông, Phú Thọ and lodged at the residence of Hà Vạn, who was a minority leader holding a substantial force. The Crown Prince Sảm, who later became the succeeding king Lý Huệ Tông, fled to Hải Ấp, Thái Bình with his mother, Noble Consort Đoàn and his two younger sisters. Sảm stayed at the residence of Trần Lý and married his daughter Trần Thị Dung. Then he conferred the title Minh Tự on Trần Lý, and the title Commander of Anterior Citadel on Trần Lý's brother-in-law Tô Trung Từ. Lý Thái Tổ also held the title of Commander of the Anterior Citadel during the time he was an official of the Anterior Lê dynasty ). They recruited soldiers from the surrounding area and fought against Quách Bốc.

When that Lý Sảm established his own court and arbitrarily conferred titles, Cao Tông sought to suppress his military power. He sent Phạm Du to associate with Đoàn Thượng, but Du missed the meeting with Đoàn Thượng because he spent time with the Princess Thiên Cực. Du was killed by the army of the landlord of Bắc Giang when crossing over Ma Lãng to go to another meeting.

Trần Lý and Tô Trung Từ led their army to the capital to defeat Quách Bốc. At the end of 1209, they suppressed the rebellion Cao Tông was once again king. Trần Lý died in battle. Because Phạm Du was dead and Tô Trung Từ held the most power in the court, Cao Tông was forced to work with him. Even though Đàm Dĩ Mông worked with the rebel Quách Bốc when he occupied the citadel, he became the Thái úy – a rather high official.

There is no document confirming how Quách Bốc and Lý Thầm died.

== The ending of the reign and some comments ==
In October 28, 1210, Cao Tông died at the age of 38 at Thánh Thọ palace. The affairs of the court were committed to Đỗ Kính Tu who became the Regent. The Crown Prince Sảm acceded to the throne and became the Emperor Lý Huệ Tông. The society was more and more turbulent. Ten years later the Lý dynasty was replaced by the Trần dynasty.

Some consider his reign to begin the fall into decay of the Lý dynasty because of his erroneous determinations.

Historians criticize Cao Tông about his incompetence leading to the Lý dynasty being lost. There were some comments given by Vietnamese ancient historians:

- Cao Tông was an epicurean Emperor, who was lost in lust, hunting, spirits, music. He also wasted much money in building his own palace, pagoda ....
- He had many competent officials such as Đỗ Kính Tu, Phạm Bỉnh Di but he didn't hear them, per contra, he killed Phạm Bỉnh Di and heard Phạm Du, who was a foxy and deceitful official.
- Quách Bốc's force could not be very powerful but instead of confronting and oppressing him, Cao Tông and his subordinates fled cowardly.
- Đàm Dĩ Mông was a disloyal official, but instead of killing him, Cao Tông conferred a high-rank on him.

However, many historians agree that he had an important influence in Vietnamese history.

Cao Tông identified himself with Buddha, similar with Angkorian Khmer Empire contemporary counterpart Jayavarman VII. Lê Văn Hưu (1230–1322), a historian of the next generation, criticized Lý Cao Tông for presuming himself to be a Buddha.

== Sources ==
- Ngô Sĩ Liên (1993). Đại Việt sử ký toàn thư (PDF) (in Vietnamese) (Nội các quan bản ed.). Hanoi: Social Science Publishing House, Volume IV: Cao Tông Hoàng Đế
- Anonymous historian (1377). Đại Việt sử lược (PDF) (in Vietnamese). Vol. III: Emperor Cao Tông.
- National Bureau for Historical Record (1884). Khâm Định Việt Sử Thông Giám Cương Mục [The Imperially Ordered Annotated Text Completely Reflecting the History of Viet] (PDF) (in Vietnamese). Education Publishing House.
- Kiernan, Ben (2019). Việt Nam: a history from earliest time to the present. Oxford University Press.
- Lieberman, Victor (2003). Strange Parallels: Integration of the Mainland Southeast Asia in Global Context, c. 800-1830, Vol 1. Cambridge University Press.

Preceded by Lý Anh Tông	Emperor of the Lý dynasty 1176–1210	Succeeded by Lý Huệ Tông

Lý imperial family (notable members)

Colour note	Emperor, Empress Regnant, Retired Emperor

Lý Thái Tổ
Lý Thái Tông
Lý Thánh Tông	Ỷ Lan
Sùng Hiền hầu	Lý Nhân Tông
Lý Thần Tông
Lý Anh Tông
Lý Long Tường	Lý Nguyên vương	Lý Cao Tông	Empress Đàm
Lý Thẩm	Lý Huệ Tông	Trần Thị Dung
Trần Thái Tông	Lý Chiêu Hoàng	Princess Thuận Thiên	Trần Liễu

Notes:
- Ngô Sĩ Liên (1993), Đại Việt sử ký toàn thư (in Vietnamese) (Nội các quan bản ed.), Hanoi: Social Science Publishing House
- National Bureau for Historical Record (1998), Khâm định Việt sử Thông giám cương mục (in Vietnamese), Hanoi: Education Publishing House
- Trần Trọng Kim (1971), Việt Nam sử lược (in Vietnamese), Saigon: Center for School Materials
- Chapuis, Oscar (1995), A history of Vietnam: from Hong Bang to Tu Duc, Greenwood Publishing Group, ISBN 0313296227

Family tree of Vietnamese monarchs
