= Phạm Du =

Vietnamese official

Phạm Du (范猷, ? – 1209) was a Vietnamese official who served Emperor Lý Cao Tông.

Phạm Du's influence and unscrupulous acquisition of wealth raised opposition from Phạm Bỉnh Di, resulting in a conflict which divided the Lý court and caused the deaths of both men.

== See also ==
- Phạm Bỉnh Di
