= Phạm Bỉnh Di =

Vietnamese official

Phạm Bỉnh Di (范秉彛, ?-1209) was a Vietnamese official who served Lý Cao Tông. His rivalry with another official, Phạm Du was the catalyst for violent events that significantly weakened the Ly court.
