= Lý dynasty =

Imperial dynasty that ruled Vietnam from 1009 to 1225

Đại Cồ Việt Quốc 大瞿越國 (1009–1054) Đại Việt Quốc 大越國 (1054–1225)
- 1009–1225
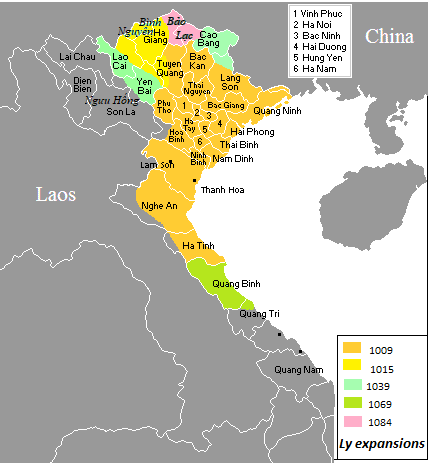
- Territories of Đại Việt and expansion period

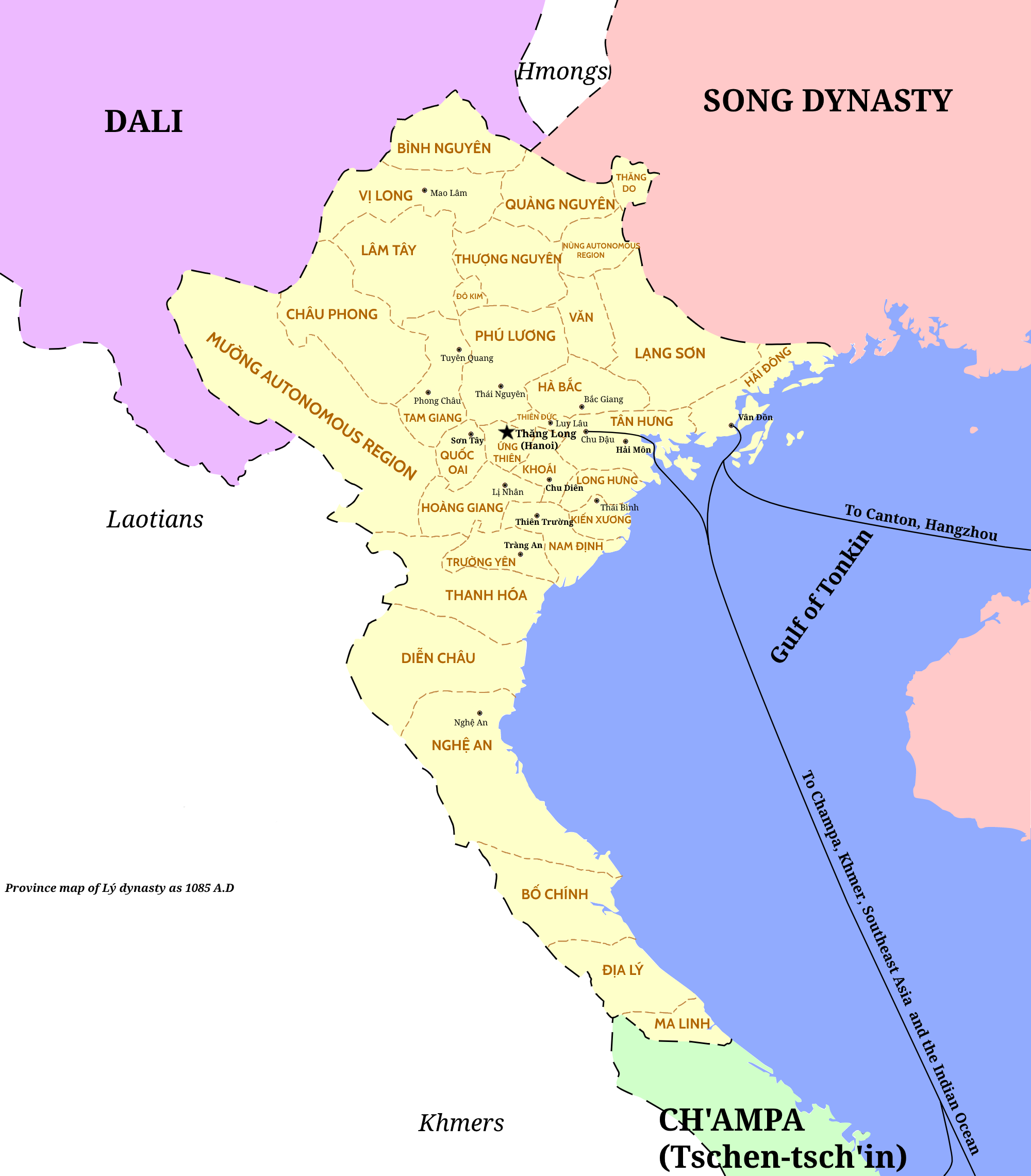
- Administrative division of Đại Việt in 1085
- Status: Internal imperial system within Song tributary
- Capital: Hoa Lư (1009–1010); Thăng Long (1010–1225)
- Official languages: Literary Chinese (Note: The use of the Classical Chinese language in documents and correspondences is distinct from the use of the Chữ Nôm writing system for the Vietnamese language.) (written)
- Common languages: Old Vietnamese
- Emperor
  - 1009–1028: Lý Thái Tổ (first)
  - 1054–1072: Lý Thánh Tông
  - 1072–1128: Lý Nhân Tông
  - 1224–1225: Lý Chiêu Hoàng (last)
- Chancellor
  - 1058: Lý Thường Kiệt
  - 1069–1073: Lý Đạo Thành
  - 1140–1158: Đỗ Anh Vũ
  - 1158–1179: Tô Hiến Thành
  - 1208–1211: Tô Trung Từ
  - 1225: Trần Thủ Độ (last)
- Historical era: Medieval Asia
  - Coronation of Lý Công Uẩn: 21 November 1009
  - War with Dali kingdom: 1014
  - Lý Thánh Tông changes the state name from Đại Cồ Việt to Đại Việt: 1054
  - Lý–Song War: 1075–1077
  - Lý Chiêu Hoàng abdicates, cedes throne to Trần Cảnh: 1225
- Currency: Copper-alloy cash coins
Preceded by	Succeeded by
Anterior Lê dynasty	Trần dynasty

Lý
- Country: Kingdom of Đại Việt (Vietnam)
- Founded: 10th century
- Founder: Lý Công Uẩn
- Final ruler: Lý Chiêu Hoàng
- Titles: Emperor of Đại Việt/King of Đại Việt Titles given by the Chinese empires: King of Giao Chỉ; King of Annam
- Traditions: Mahayana Buddhism
- Estate: Thăng Long
- Deposition: 1225

The Lý dynasty (Vietnamese: Nhà Lý, Vietnamese pronunciation: [ɲâː lǐ], chữ Nôm: 茹李, chữ Hán: 朝李, Vietnamese: triều Lý, Chinese characters: 李朝), officially Đại Cồ Việt (chữ Hán: 大瞿越) from 1009 to 1054 and Đại Việt (chữ Hán: 大越) from 1054 to 1225, was a Vietnamese dynasty that existed from 1009 to 1225. It was established by Lý Công Uẩn when he overthrew the Anterior Lê dynasty. The dynasty ended when empress regnant Lý Chiêu Hoàng (then 8 years old) was pressured to abdicate the throne in favor of her husband, Trần Cảnh in 1225, the dynasty lasted for 216 years. During Lý Thánh Tông's reign, the official name of the state was changed from Đại Cồ Việt to Đại Việt, a name that would remain Vietnam's official name until the onset of the 19th century.

Domestically, while the Lý emperors were devout in their adherence to Buddhism, the influence of Confucianism from China was on the rise, with the opening of the Temple of Literature in 1070, built for the veneration of the Confucius and his disciples. Six years later in 1076, the Quốc Tử Giám (Guozijian) was established within the same complex; Initially the education was limited to the children of the emperor, the imperial family as well as mandarin and nobility, serving as Vietnam's first university institution. The first imperial examination was held in 1075 and Lê Văn Thịnh became the first Trạng Nguyên (Zhuangyuan) of Vietnam.

Politically, the dynasty established an administration system based on the rule of law rather than on autocratic principles. They chose the Đại La Citadel as the capital (later renamed Thăng Long and subsequently Hanoi). Ly Dynasty held onto power in part due to their economic strength, stability and general popularity among the population rather than by military means like previous dynasties. This set off a historical precedent for following dynasties, as prior to the Ly Dynasty, most Vietnamese dynasties lasted very briefly, often fall to the state of decline following the respective dynasty founder's death.

Noblemen scholars such as Lê Văn Thịnh, Bùi Quốc Khái, Doãn Tử Tư, Đoàn Văn Khâm, Lý Đạo Thành, and Tô Hiến Thành made vast contributions culturally and politically, allowing the dynasty to flourish for 216 years.

== History ==
=== Founding ===
The last emperor of the Anterior Lê dynasty, the unpopular Lê Long Đĩnh, died in 1009. His crown prince son was still very young and could not take over power from his own father. Members of the imperial court, including the official Đào Cam Mộc and the Buddhist monk Vạn Hạnh, decided to install general Lý Công Uẩn to become the new emperor of Đại Cồ Việt.

The first ruler of the Lý dynasty, Lý Công Uẩn, was of Min Chinese ancestry (from Min kingdom, today's Fujian province). The identity of his birth-father is unknown; likewise, little is known about his maternal side except that his mother was surnamed Phạm. Very few direct details about his parents (unknown birth-father, mother, and adoptive father Lý Khánh Văn) are known, however, the ethnic Chinese background of Lý Công Uẩn, at least on his paternal side, had been accepted by Vietnamese historian Trần Quốc Vượng. The Lý clan of Lý Công Uẩn's adoptive father Lý Khánh Văn was a Vietic Tao-hua clan that originated from the highland regions in Feng district.

Công Uẩn himself was born in 974 CE in Cổ Pháp region, Bắc Giang circuit (now in Từ Sơn, Bắc Ninh Province, Vietnam). When he was three years old, Công Uẩn was adopted by a monk of Cổ Pháp pagoda named Lý Khánh Văn, whose surname Công Uẩn inherited. The good-looking and intelligent Công Uẩn was noted as an extraordinary child by Buddhist Zen master Vạn Hạnh. When mature, he joined the palace guard and rose through the ranks to commandership. In 1009, Công Uẩn succeeded Lê Long Đĩnh of the Lê family, thereby founding the Lý dynasty.

=== Moving the capital ===
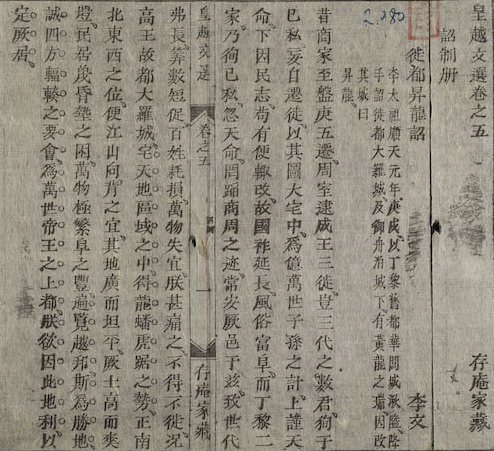
Thiên đô chiếu (遷都詔), written in 1009 by Emperor Lý Thái Tổ when he decided to move from Hoa Lư to Đại La (later renamed Thang Long, as known as Hanoi today)

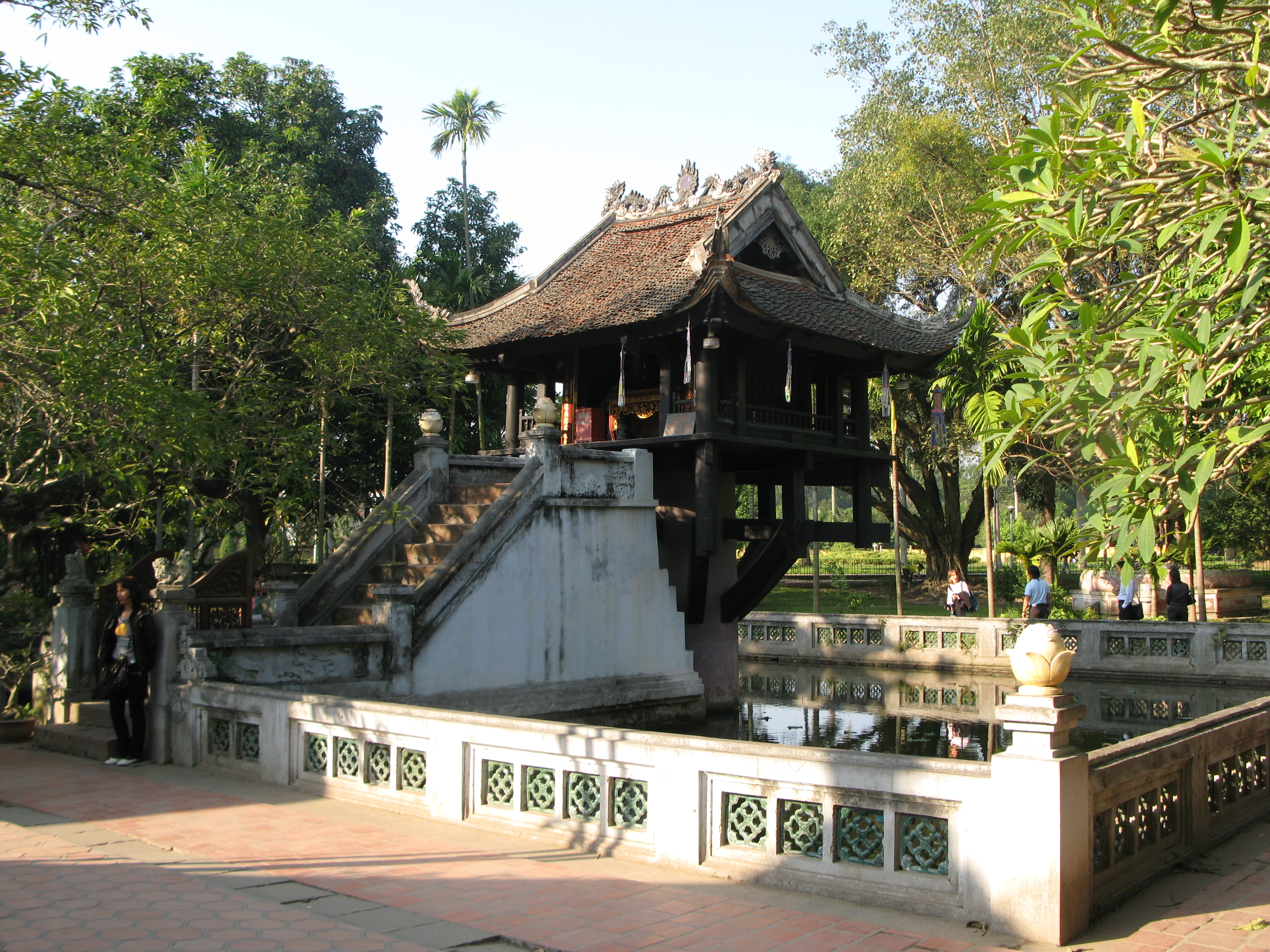
One Pillar Pagoda, built by emperor Lý Thái Tông in 1049

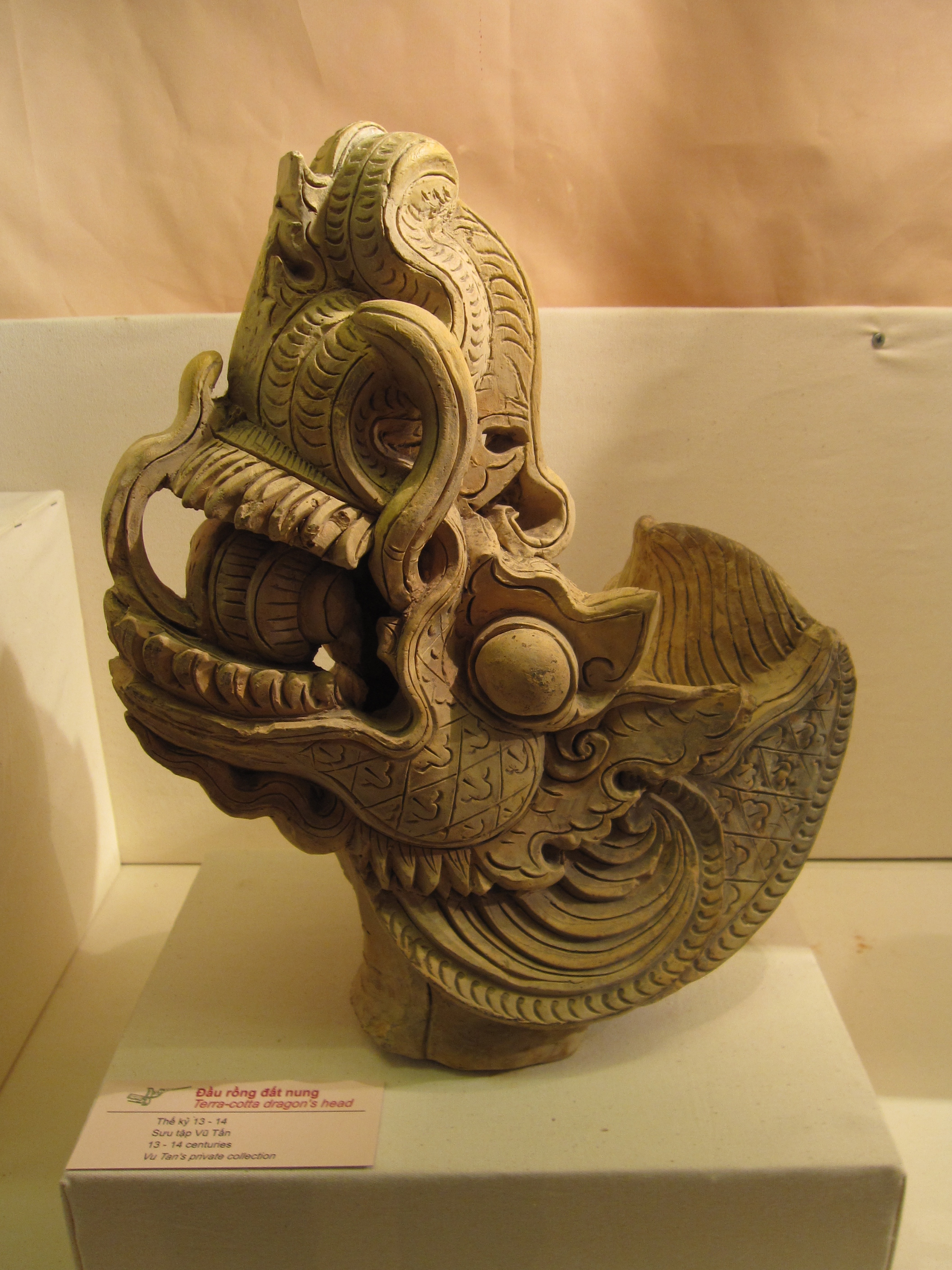
A Lý dynasty terracotta dragon's head

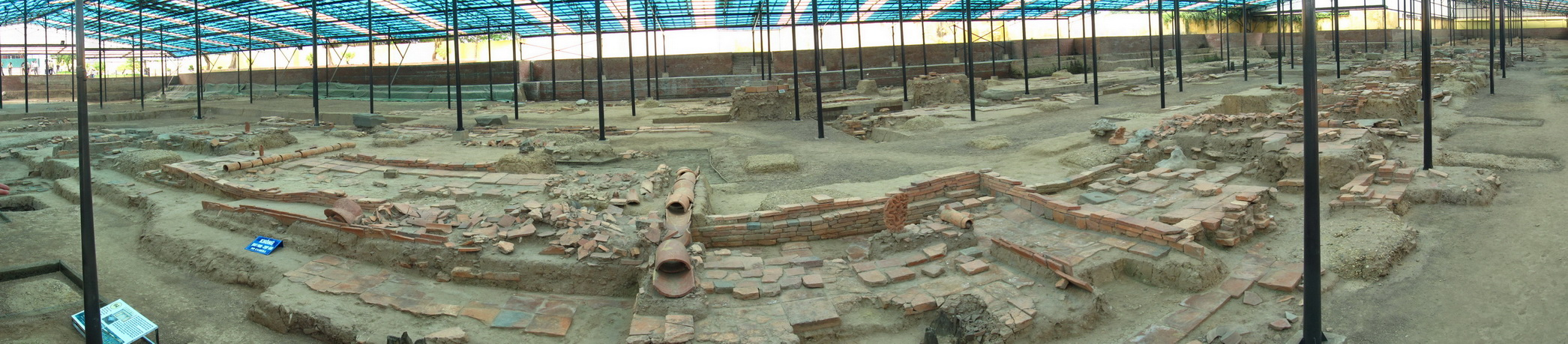
Ruins of the Lý dynasty Imperial Citadel of Thăng Long.

After a year of enthronement, in 1010, Lý Thái Tổ started to move the capital from Hoa Lư (Ninh Bình) to Đại La (Hà Nội), and renamed it Thang Long. He wrote the Edict on the Transfer of the Capital to announce his plan to move to the new place.

This decision had a marked influence on Vietnam, which opening the flourishing era of the dynasty. Following dynasties such as Trần, Lê and Mạc continued to use Hà Nội as their capital, as does the Socialist Republic of Vietnam today.

=== Crisis of the three princes ===
In 1028, Lý Thái Tổ died at the age 55 with Posthumous name Thần Vũ hoàng đế (神武皇帝), he was buried at Thọ Lăng imperial tomb.

In his funeral, most of his mandarins expected crown prince Lý Phật Mã (Prince Khai Thiên) to assume the throne. However, three of his brothers: Prince Đông Chinh (Đông Chinh vương), Prince Dực Thánh (Dực Thánh vương) and Prince Vũ Đức (Vũ Đức vương) rejected the decision and attacked the imperial palace with their own armies to take Prince Khai Thiên's throne.

Lý Phật Mã discovered the plot, he ordered all the gates of palace to be closed and arranged guards for protection. However his eunuch Lý Nhân Nghĩa advised him to engage with betrayers. Lý Phật Mã decide to let Lý Nhân Nghĩa to lead the imperial army to fight against his brothers. Lý Nhân Nghĩa succeeded in his campaign and caught Vũ Đức Vương, while the two other princes escaped. Lý Phật Mã then enthroned and take the temple name Lý Thái Tông. He grant mercy to all those who tried to opposed him and pardoned his two brothers Đông Chinh vương and Dực Thánh vương, letting them return to their former positions. The emperor issued a rule requiring government officials to make an annual pledge of loyalty, with heavy punishments for those who avoided.

=== Golden era ===
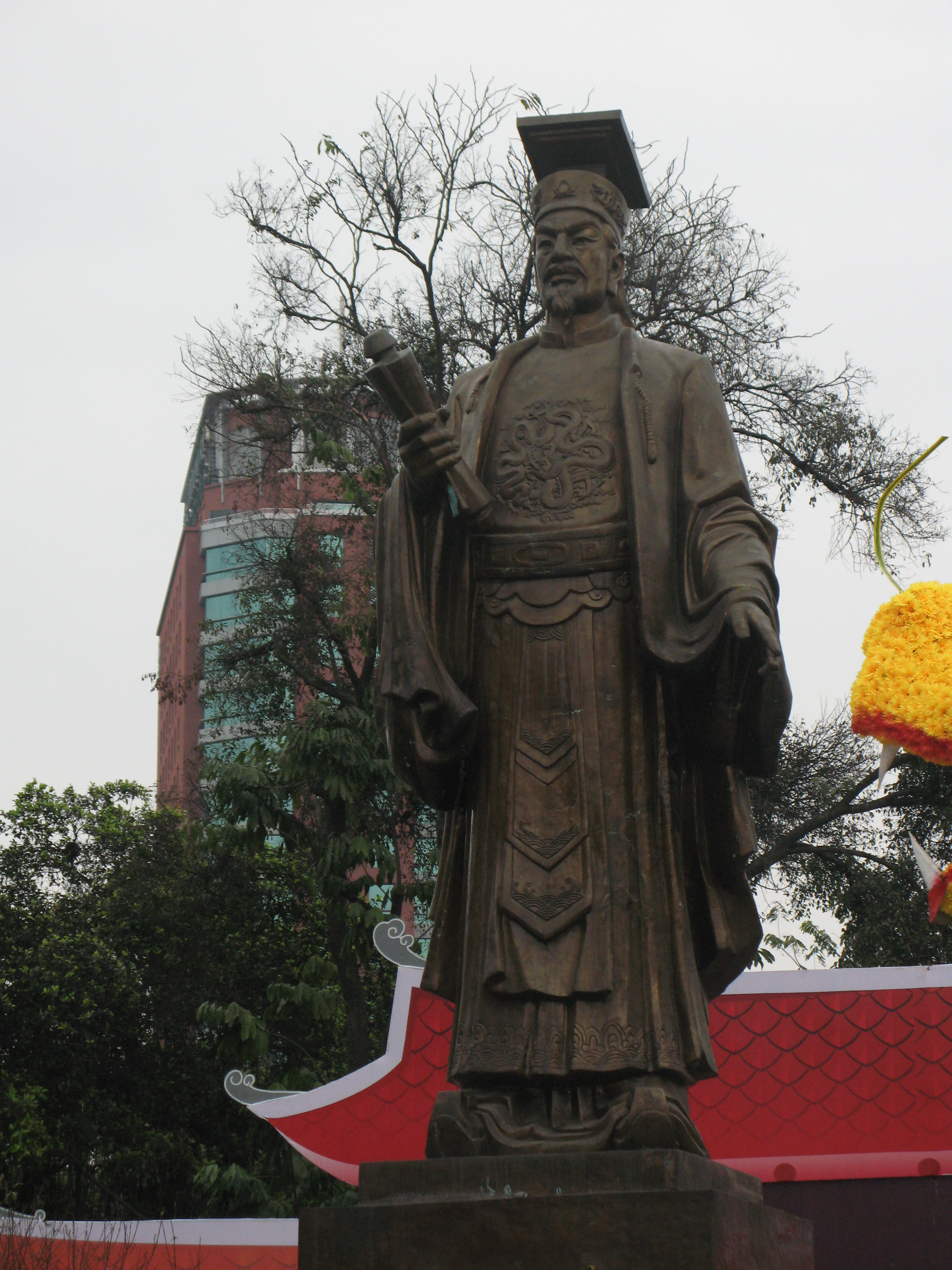
Statue of emperor Lý Thái Tổ (974–1028), Hanoi

From the reign of Lý Thái Tổ with the other emperors, the Lý dynasty began to focus on solving some major and minor situations:

- Strengthen internal rule: the economy was promoted to high progress, especially agriculture. The government introduced "Hình thư" (Ministry of Punishments) as the first system of law and legislation of Vietnam after gaining independence from China and opened the education system based on imperial examination of China
- Strengthen territory reigning : The imperial court tried to expand their influence to the remote areas by managing the marriage policy such as giving princesses to marry with the other local lords for closer relationships with imperial family. To conciliate those who were not loyal to the government, the emperor will order princes to eliminate the revolts.
- Protecting country from foreigners: Resolve and reconcile some minor issues with Song dynasty, fighting against the invasions of Nanzhao and Champa.

One of the big events of the Lý dynasty is changing the name of the country from Đại Cồ Việt (大瞿越) to Đại Việt (大越) in 1054 under the reign of Lý Thánh Tông. During the Lý dynasty, the Vietnamese began their long march to the south (Nam tiến) at the expense of the Chams. In 1069, Champa Kingdom gained support from the Song dynasty and stopped paying tribute to Đại Việt. As the result, the emperor Lý Thánh Tông ordered an expedition against Champa and successfully captured King Rudravarman III of Champa. Rudravarman III had to sign a treaty with Lý Thánh Tông to cede three territories Địa Lí, Ma Linh and Bố Chính (modern Quảng Trị and Quảng Bình) to Đại Việt in exchange for his release. Champa also had to restore the tributary system to Lý dynasty.

The Lý Emperors supported the improvement of Vietnam's agricultural system by constructing and repairing dikes and canals and by allowing soldiers to return to their villages to work for six months of each year. As their territory and population expanded, the Lý Emperors looked to China as a model for organizing a strong, centrally administered state.

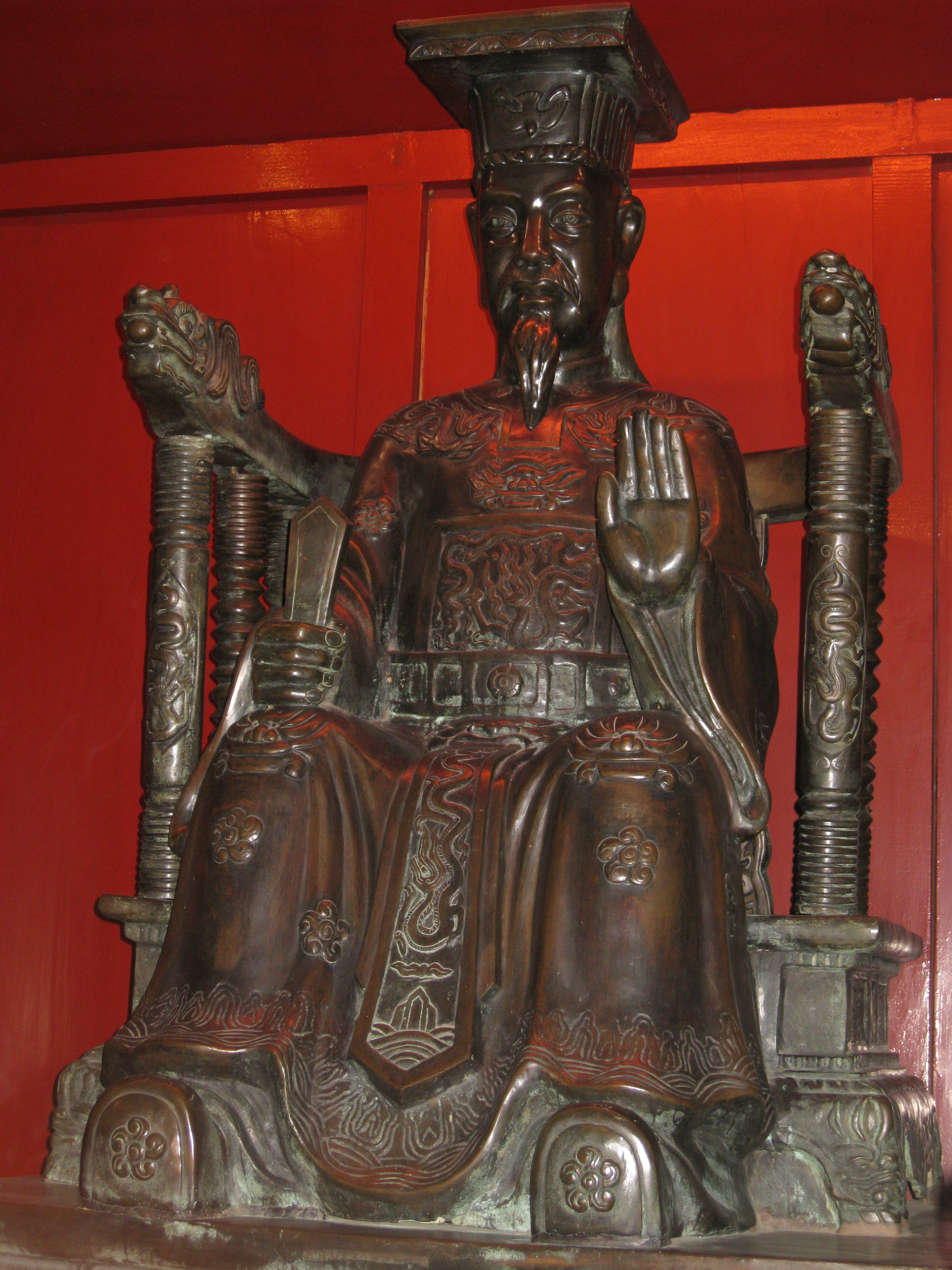
Emperor Lý Thánh Tông (1054–1072)

In 1070, Lý Thánh Tông ordered the construction of the Imperial Academy (Quốc Tử Giám) and the confucian Văn Miếu Temple to boost education. Minor officials were chosen by examination for the first time in 1075, and a civil service training institute was set up in 1076. In 1089 a fixed hierarchy of state officials was established, with nine degrees of civil and military scholar officials. Examinations for public office were made compulsory, and literary competitions were held to determine the grades of officials.

Emperor Lý Thánh Tông died in 1072, the crown prince Càn Đức was enthroned at 7 as emperor Lý Nhân Tông. Empress Dowager Dương became regent, but was toppled the next year by a plot by Lý Nhân Tông's mother, Concubine Ỷ Lan. She ordered the former Empress to be buried alive in the emperor's mausoleum along with over 70 servants. Ỷ Lan then became regency with help of Chancellor Lý Thường Kiệt.

In the 1050s, tensions between Đại Việt and the Song dynasty became high. In 1075, Wang Anshi, the chancellor of the Song dynasty, told Emperor Shenzong that Đại Việt was destroyed by Champa, with less than ten thousand soldiers surviving, so it would be a good occasion to annex the country. The Song emperor then mobilized his troops, this prompted the Emperor Lý Nhân Tông to authorize a preemptive invasion into Song territory. Lý Thường Kiệt lead an army to capture Qinzhou, Lianzhou and laid siege to Yongzhou (present day Nanning). Yongzhou fell in 1076, its populace of 58,000 were massacred. The Song sent a great army to invade Đại Việt but Lý Thường Kiệt managed to stop them at the Battle of Như Nguyệt (1077). The Song and Dai Viet would then make a peace treaty. The Song returned its conquered lands to Đại Việt and recognized Lý Nhân Tông as King of Nam Bình.

=== Succession crises and regencies ===
Emperor Lý Nhân Tông was the longest reigned ruler in the history of Vietnam. As he was childless, his nephew Lý Dương Hoán (李陽煥), who he adopted, was chosen to be the crown prince. Lý Nhân Tông died in 1128. Lý Dương Hoán was enthroned at age 11 and took temple name Lý Thần Tông. The death of Lý Nhân Tông had marked the transition of succession from the main line to the cadet line. Lý Thần Tông would die young after ruling for 10 years. Crown prince Lý Thiên Tộ then enthroned as Emperor Lý Anh Tông at 3 year old.

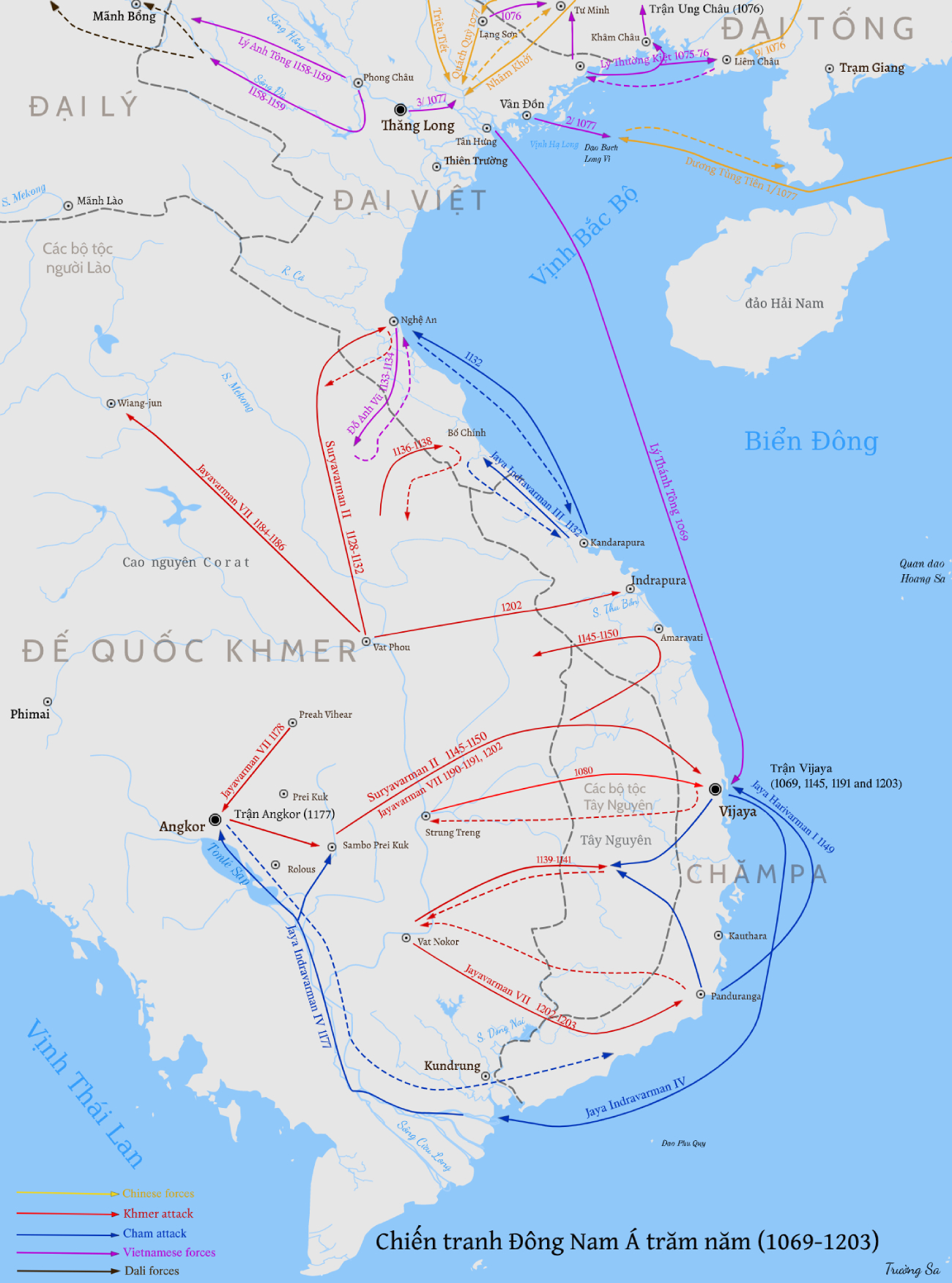
Wars fought between 1069–1203 by Đại Việt

Thần Tông's Empress Cảm Thánh became regency. Her lover Commandant Đỗ Anh Vũ (杜英武) would rise into power in the court. This was met with opposition from other mandarins and imperial members, who staged to arrest Đỗ Anh Vũ. However, by the empress's intervention, he was not killed but instead banished as a peasant. The empress dowager used her influence to restore the position for Anh Vũ, he was subsequently pardoned and took revenge on the people who tried to arrest him. The emperor unwillingly had to approve it and Anh Vũ's enemies were impeached then executed. Đỗ Anh Vũ died in 1158. Tô Hiến Thành (蘇憲誠), a relative of Anh Vũ, later become the chancellor. Different from his brother in law, Tô Hiến Thành was loyal to the Lý court, his skills and talents were proven in organizing successful military campaigns against the Thân Lợi and Ngưu Hống rebellions.

In 1174, Lý Anh Tông's crown prince Lý Long Xưởng was involved in debauchery with a concubine of the emperor, he was made retired from the titled and replaced by Lý Long Cán. In 1175, emperor Anh Tông died at aged 40, the young Lý Cao Tông was enthroned with Tô Hiến Thành again holding the regency.

Lý Cao Tông became the emperor at three. His mother, Concubine Đỗ became Chiêu Thiên Chí Lý Empress dowager. Her younger brother Đỗ An Di became Consort kin and Tô Hiến Thành was still a regent and teacher to teach the emperor. Empress Chiêu Linh, mother of the deposed Prince Lý Long Xưởng tried to take the throne back for his son but failed because of Tô Hiến Thành's determination.

In 1179, Chancellor Tô Hiến Thành died when emperor Cao Tông was only six and Đỗ An Di replaced him as regent. In 1188, Đỗ An Di died and Ngô Lý Tín replaced him until his death in 1190. Then, Đàm Dĩ Mông (譚以蒙), the younger brother of Empress An Toàn, became regent.

Emperor Lý Cao Tông pursued a corrupted policy in which rich people could buy themselves to become high rank officials, which led the nation into crisis. He enjoyed the luxury life and exploit his people to build him palaces, resulting in the hatred of people being cumulated and revolts happened.

=== Rebellions and civil war ===
The Quách Bốc rebellion was the main reason of weakening the dynasty. In 1207, the Governor Đoàn Thượng (段尚) of Hồng Châu (now Hải Dương and Hải Phòng provinces) began the revolt against the court. The emperor ordered generals Phạm Bỉnh Di (范秉異), Phạm Du (范兪), Đàm Dĩ Mông and the others to lead army to suppress the revolt. Nevertheless, Đoàn Thượng corrupted Phạm Du to retreat his infantry and persuade emperor to retreat all soldiers.

Phạm Du was then sent to train the military in Nghệ An but he started to recruit criminals for his own agenda. Emperor Cao Tông dispatched Phạm Bỉnh Di to capture Phạm Du, Du lost the battle and fled to Hồng province.In 1209, Phạm Bỉnh Di had victory over the Đoàn Thượng rebels. The emperor then summoned Du back to Thăng Long but Du slandered Phạm Bỉnh Di to prove himself innocent. Cao Tông trusted Du's accusation and ordered to capture Phạm Bỉnh Di and his son (Phạm Phụ). Upon the capture of his lord, Quách Bốc (郭卜), a general of Bỉnh Di, decided to assault the imperial palace to rescue his master. Emperor Cao Tông had Bỉnh Di and his son killed and they both fled to Phú Thọ. Quách Bốc captured the imperial palace and installed Prince Lý Thầm to be the new emperor.

Prince Lý Hạo Sảm (李日旵) fled to Hải Ấp with his mother Empress An Toàn, where they met the leader of Trần clan, Trần Lý (陳李) and general Tô Trung Từ, both support Lý Hạo Sảm as the emperor. Lý Hạo Sảm was then married to the daughter of Trần Lý, Trần Thị Dung (陳氏庸). Emperor Lý Cao Tông put a fight against Sảm but failing to reclaim the throne. Finally, Trần Lý led the army against Quách Bốc and ended the rebellion. However the Đại Việt kingdom was already in partition by many warlords.

In 1210, Lý Cao Tông died. Lý Hạo Sảm was enthroned as Emperor Lý Huệ Tông. General Tô Trung Từ gained too much power that he was killed by other officials. His nephew Trần Tự Khánh, amassed an army and threatened the capital. Emperor Huệ Tông then turned to warlord Đoàn Thượng who rebelled earlier for help, but they were defeated by Tự Khánh. The emperor had to escape to Lạng Sơn.

In 1214, Tự Khánh installed the Emperor Lý Nguyên Hoàng as a puppet ruler. At the same time, Nguyễn Nộn, a warlord attacked the capital and burnt all the palaces, forcing Tự Khánh and Emperor Nguyên Hoàng to move to Hà Nam. The country is again divided by multiple warlords, the major ones being Nguyễn Nộn, Tự Khánh and Đoàn Thượng.

In late 1214, Trần Tự Khánh forces retook the capital and gradually managed to conquered the warlords. In 1217, Đoàn Thượng surrendered to the court, he was pardoned and granted title of Prince of Hồng. By the end of 1220, all the minor warlords excepts Nguyễn Nộn, were subdued. Nguyễn Nộn himself later died of illness in 1229.

=== Rise of Trần clan ===
In winter 1216, Trần Thị Dung was granted the title Empress. People of Trần clan were then promoted to several important positions in the court: Trần Tự Khánh became chancellor, his brother Trần Thừa was titled Marquis, Trần Thừa's son Trần Liễu was titled Prince of Phụng Cần.

In 1217, Emperor Lý Huệ Tông suffered a serious illness and became mentally ill. He occasionally called himself the Heaven General and would dance all day long holding his sword and shield. By this time, most of the court matters are managed by chancellor Trần Tự Khánh and not by the emperor anymore, the court power base gradually switched to the Trần clan. In 1223, the chancellor Trần Tự Khánh died, Trần Thừa replaced his position and was given even more privileges from the Emperor.

=== Abdication of Lý Chiêu Hoàng ===
Emperor Huệ Tông did not have a son as heir. Captain Trần Thủ Độ (Trần Thừa's cousin) then decided the emperor's second daughter Princess Chiêu Thánh will be crowned as Queen of Đại Việt. In 1224, Huệ Tông abdicated and gave the throne to the crowned princess. Lý Chiêu Hoàng, at 6 years old, became the first reigning queen of Vietnam.

Trần Thủ Độ took on his hand all the daily handling of the Lý court. He brought his nephew Trần Cảnh (the second son of Trần Thừa) to become the confidant of young Queen. Both of them then had blossom closed relationship. In aim to overthrow the rule of Lý dynasty, Trần Thủ Độ arranged their marriage in the next year. Trần Cảnh later became the Consort of Lý dynasty. In 1226, Trần Thủ Độ forced Lý Chiêu Hoàng to give the throne to Trần Cảnh, Trần Thừa became the Regent Retired Emperor. The rule of Lý was formally transferred to Trần. The former emperor Huệ Tông was forced to commit suicide at Chân Giáo Temple. The Lý aristocrats were then massacred in 1232 by Thủ Độ. The Lý dynasty ceased to exist and Trần dynasty was officially established.

After the Lý dynasty was toppled, some imperial members of the clan escaped to Korea and became generals of Goryeo dynasty.

== Civil service system ==
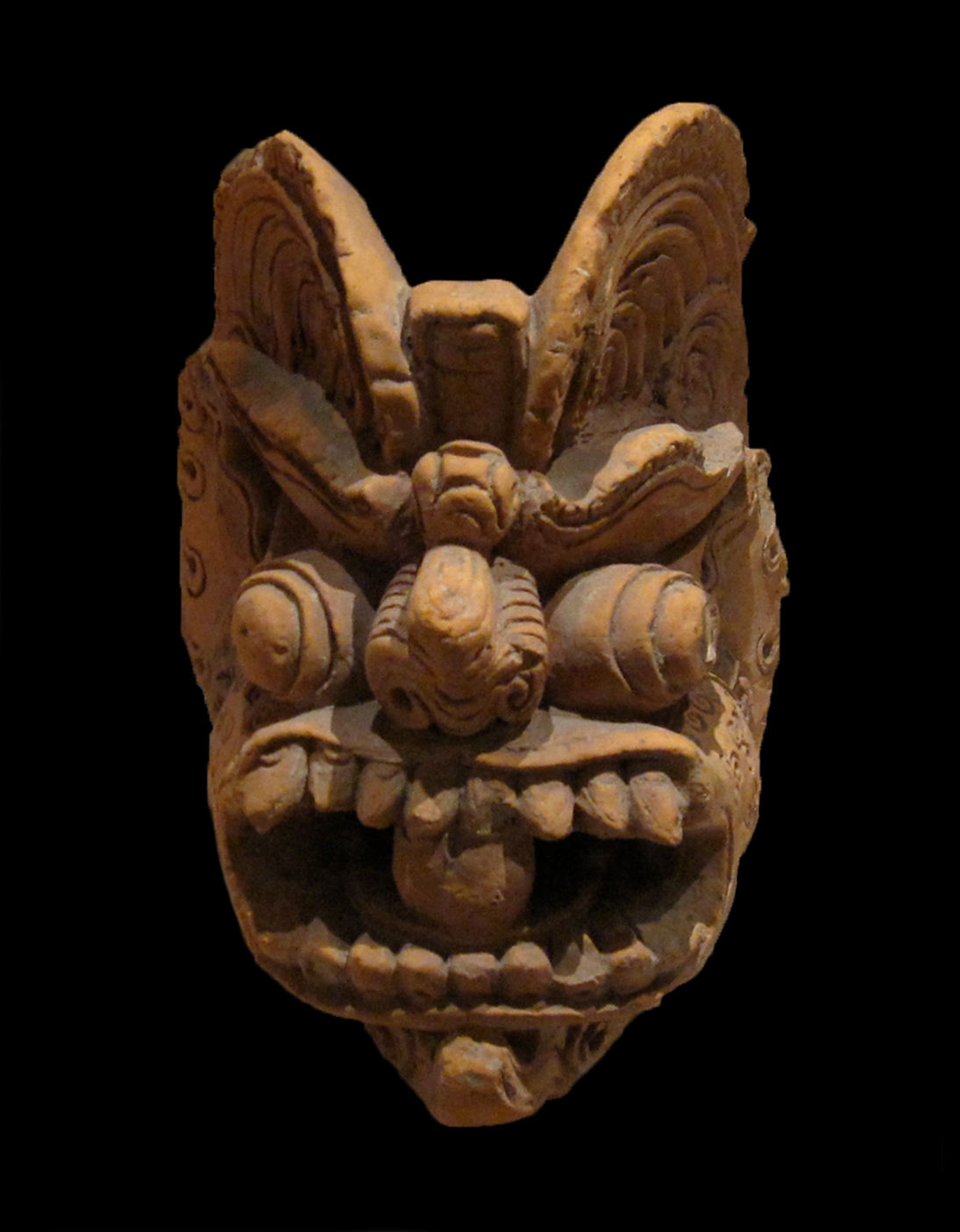
Terracotta dragon head, used as architectural decoration (11th–13th century)

At the central level, under the king were the Thái positions: Tam thái for the three literary mandarins (Thái sư, Thái bảo and Thái phó), and Thái úy for the martial mandarin. Under the Tháis were the Thiếu positions like Thiếu sư, Thiếu bảo, Thiếu phó, and Thiếu úy. According to Giao Chỉ di biên (Records of the uncivilized Jiaozhi), the bureaucratic system of the Lý dynasty was more elaborate than that of previous dynasties. Its official positions included the vice regent, chancellor, bureau director, yuanwailang, shumishi and local military leaders.

== Administration division ==
In 1010, Lý Thái Tổ changed the 10 đạo subdivisions into 24 lộ. The lộ was possibly subdivided into châu (in mountainous areas) or phủ (in the lowlands). The châu and phủ were further subdivided into huyện and giáp, and under them hương and ấp. He imposed on these divisions taxes on land, salt, ivory and mountain specialties.

== Law ==
During the Lý dynasty, laws in Đại Việt were primarily based on imperial proclamations, although a body of law composing of civil laws, criminal laws, litigation laws, and laws dealing with marriage existed. However, because the Lý rulers were devout Buddhists, the punishments during this era were not very severe.

Law enforcement were carried out by the Protectorate (Đô hộ phủ). The Protectorate was initially a prefectural office established to govern the whole Jiaozhi during the Tang dynasty, in the Third Era of Northern Domination. From the Đinh to Lý dynasty, the Protectorate was retained, but its role was limited to carrying out law enforcement.

== Foreign relations ==
The Lý dynasty has maintained trade relationships with China, the Dali Kingdom, and other Southeast Asian kingdoms.

=== Song dynasty ===
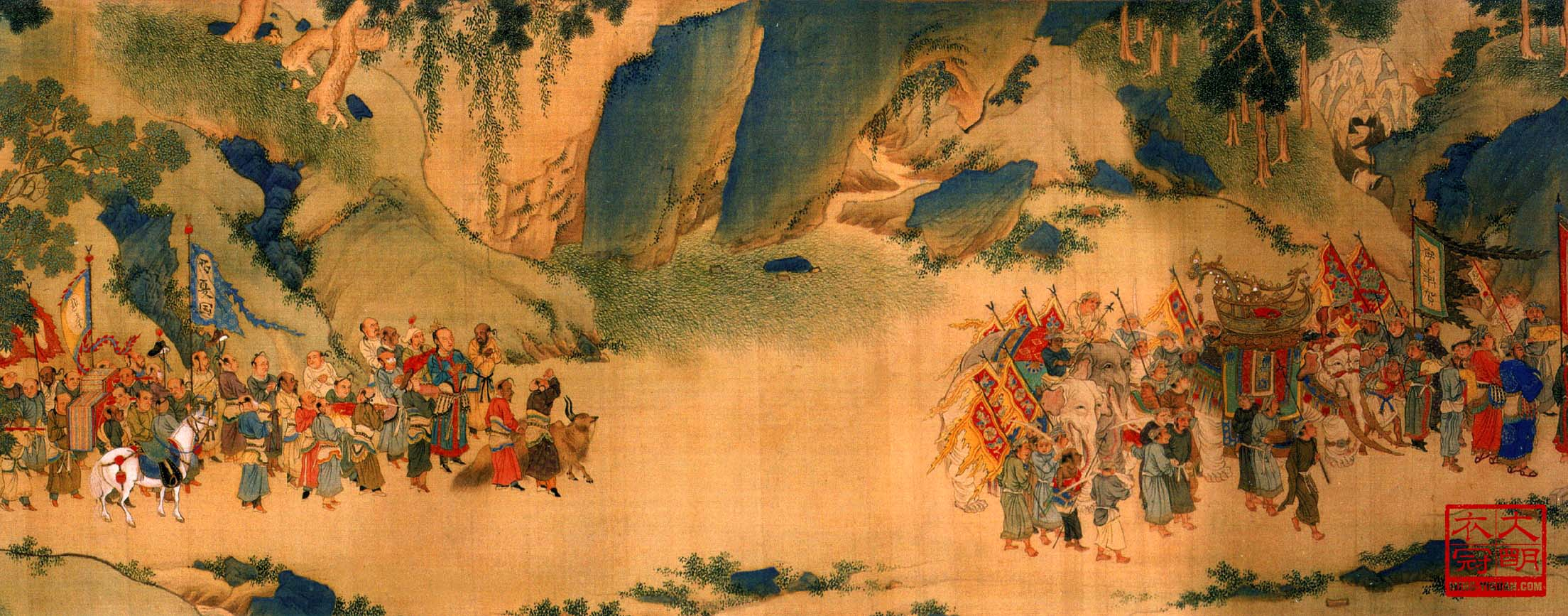
The tributary mission of Đại Việt (right) and delegation of Western Xia (left) to Song China painted in Ming dynasty.

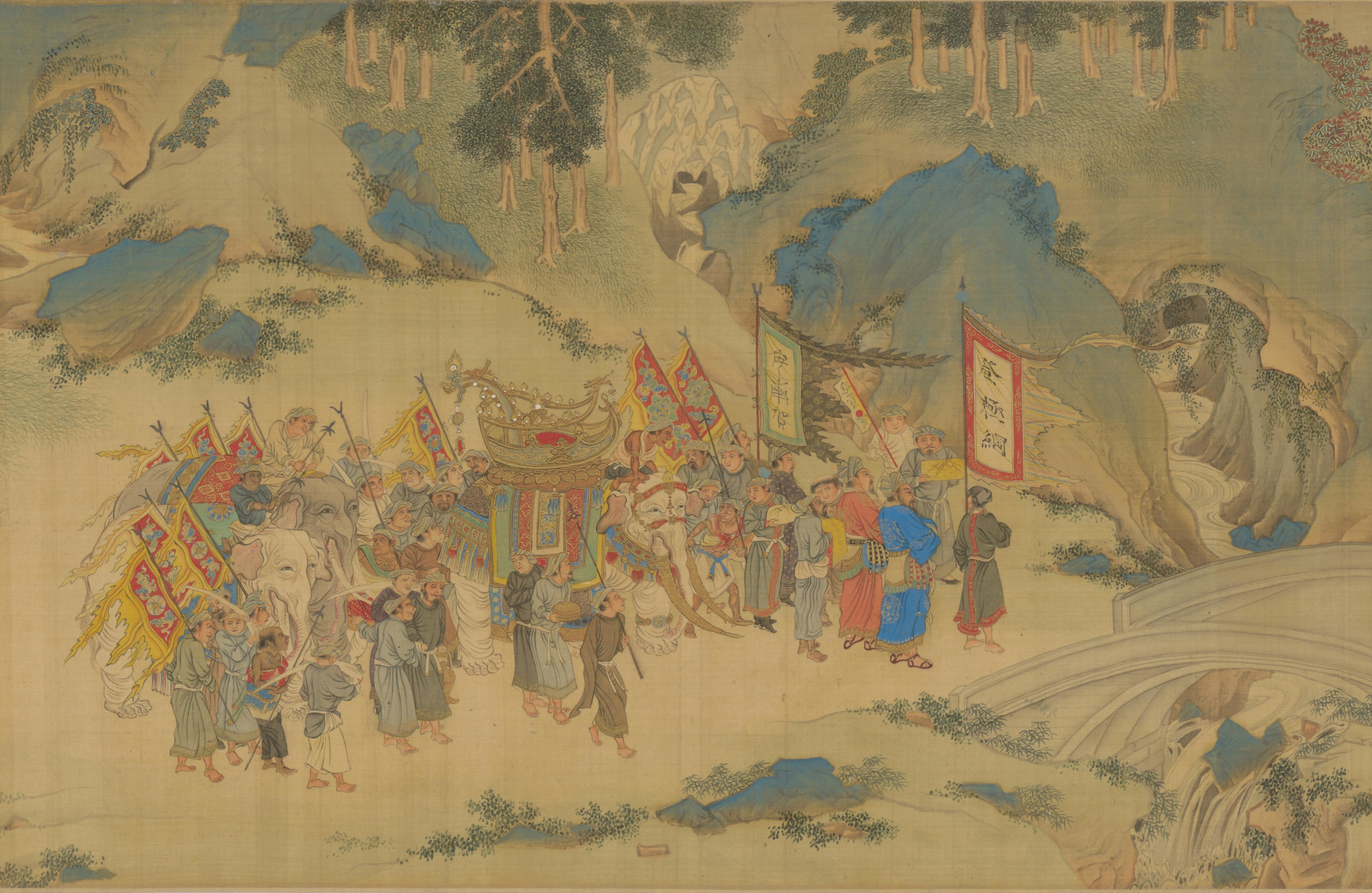
The tributary mission of Đại Việt to Song China painted in Ming dynasty.

In foreign relations with the Song dynasty, Vietnam acted as a vassal state, although at its zenith it had sent troops into Chinese territory to fight the Song during the Lý–Song War.

In 1016, Lý Công Uẩn was appointed as Jinghai Junjie Dushi (Military Commissioner of Jinghai) and was crowned Giao Chi Quan Vuong (King of Giao Chi) by the Song emperor. For the first time in the Song dynasty's relations with Vietnam, the Song dynasty reciprocated Lý tributes in 1028 as recognition of the political power of the Lý. The Song dynasty also deployed officers to attend the funeral of a deceased Vietnamese king for the first time during the Lý dynasty.

Tensions between the Lý and Song increased during the reign of Lý Nhân Tông (1072–1128), whose military seized Qinzhou, Lianzhou, and Yongzhou along the Lý-Song border after his attack on Champa. In 1075, Song prime minister Wang Anshi informed the Song emperor of the decline in the Lý's power following its defeat by the Champa, prompting the Lý-Song War during which the Song launched a failed invasion. The conflict ended after Lý Nhân Tông sought reconciliation following Lý military successes.

During the era of Lý Anh Tông (1138–1175), the Song dynasty changed its name for Vietnam from Jiaozhi (Giao Chi) to Annan (Annam).

=== Jin dynasty ===
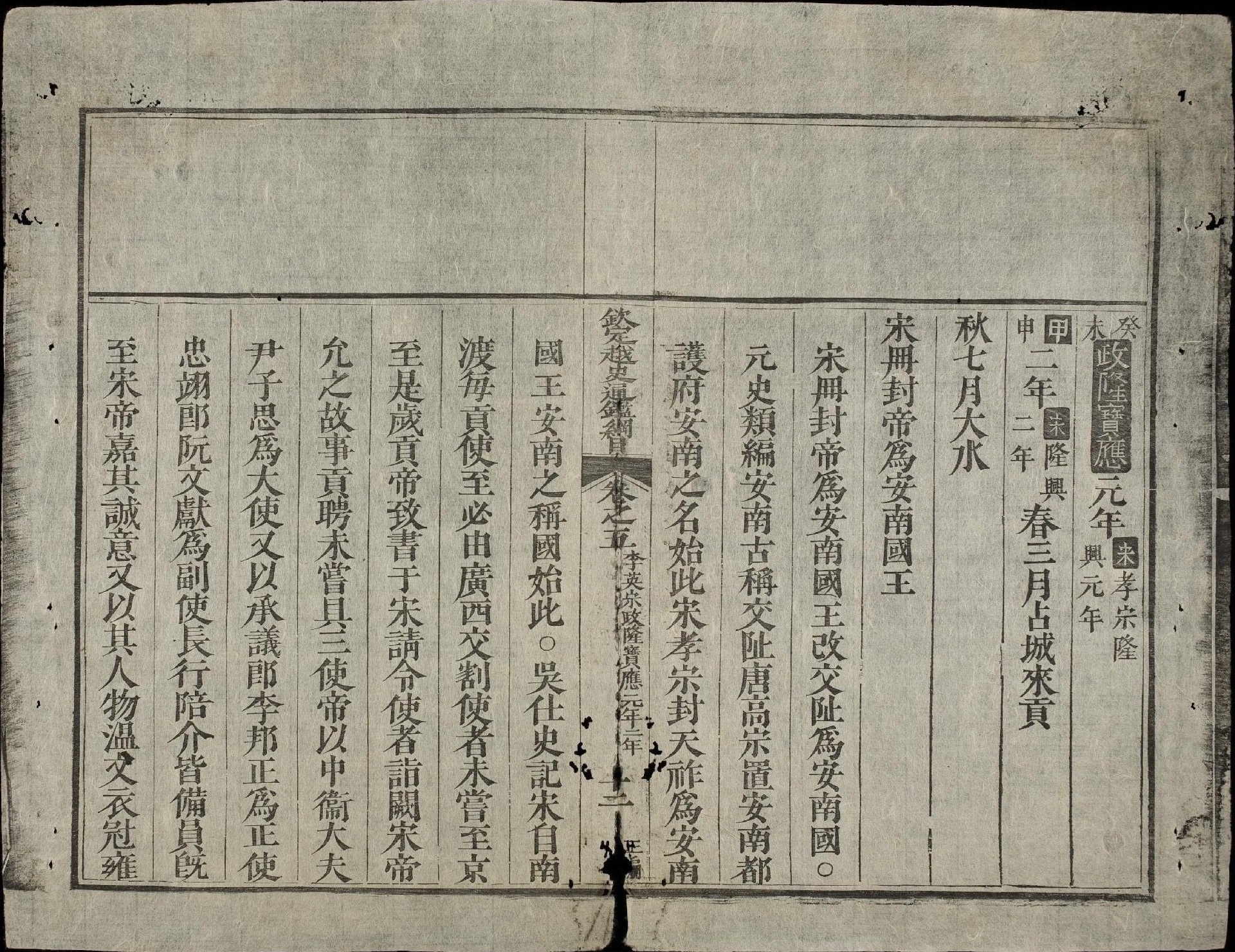
Doãn Tử Tư (尹子思) envoy of Đại Việt to Southern Song. The Emperor Xiaozong of Song granted the title of king of Annam (An Nam quốc vương (安南國王).) to emperor Lý Anh Tông in September 1164)

In 1168, Jin Emperor Shizong sent an envoy to Thăng Long to establish relationship. Both Jin and Song ambassadors visited Lý court in the same time, but emperpor Lý Anh Tông ordered do not let them face together to avoid tension.

=== Dali kingdom ===
In 1013, administration in mountain prefecture Vị Long (now in southeast Yunnan) was Hà Trắc Tuấn allied with Dali kingdom started rebelling against the Lý government. Dali forces and Tuấn with tribal supports invaded Đại Cồ Việt in spring 1014. According to An Nam chí lược by 14th-century historian Lê Tắc, Dali and rebel forces numbered about 30,000 troops. They occupied Bình Nguyên province (southeast Yunnan and Hà Giang province), stationed there and waited for the Lý reinforcement were coming. Lý Thái Tổ sent an army and crushed the rebels. Dali general Yang Zhanghe was captured. Peace was restore in mountainous border next few years.

=== Champa ===
The Lý had trade relationships with Champa and fought them in 2 battles in 1044 and 1069 of Cham-Vietnamese wars.

== Military organization ==
The military organization under the first three emperors of the Lý dynasty follow the organizational models of the local forces in the prefectures of the Tang dynasty and the royal guard of the Song dynasty. The royal guard consisted of 10 units, with 200 troops in each unit, and each unit was divided into a left wing and a right wing. Since the reign of Lý Thái Tông, the local forces had included militia, with every male citizen aged 18 or older registered in the Yellow Registration Book. This book enabled the local authorities to manage the poll tax during peacetime and to draft these men when a mobilization order was issued. The standing army consisted of 9 units. Soldiers in the standing army alternated between military service and working on farms to sustain themselves. The royal court did not provide these soldiers with food or rations. Units in the standing army were under the commands of royal generals. During wartime, if the standing army could not be adequately sustained, those generals could draft militia forces. Male citizens aged 18 or older could also be drafted into the royal guard. Major military campaigns, such as the invasions of the Song dynasty and Champa, were launched with the royal guard army. Đại Việt sử ký tiền biên briefly records that each royal guard was paid 10 sheaves of rice for their service, but it does not clearly state whether this payment was made monthly or at any other regular interval. Their daily meal consisted of rations made from barley. During the Tết holiday, on the seventh day of the first lunar month, each royal guard received a Tết bonus consisting of 300 quan (貫, strings of cash), one piece of silk, and one piece of cloth. The royal court also organized a year end feast for the royal guards, which took place in the first day of the Lunar New Year. The royal guards were served sticky rice and fermented fish.

== Religion ==
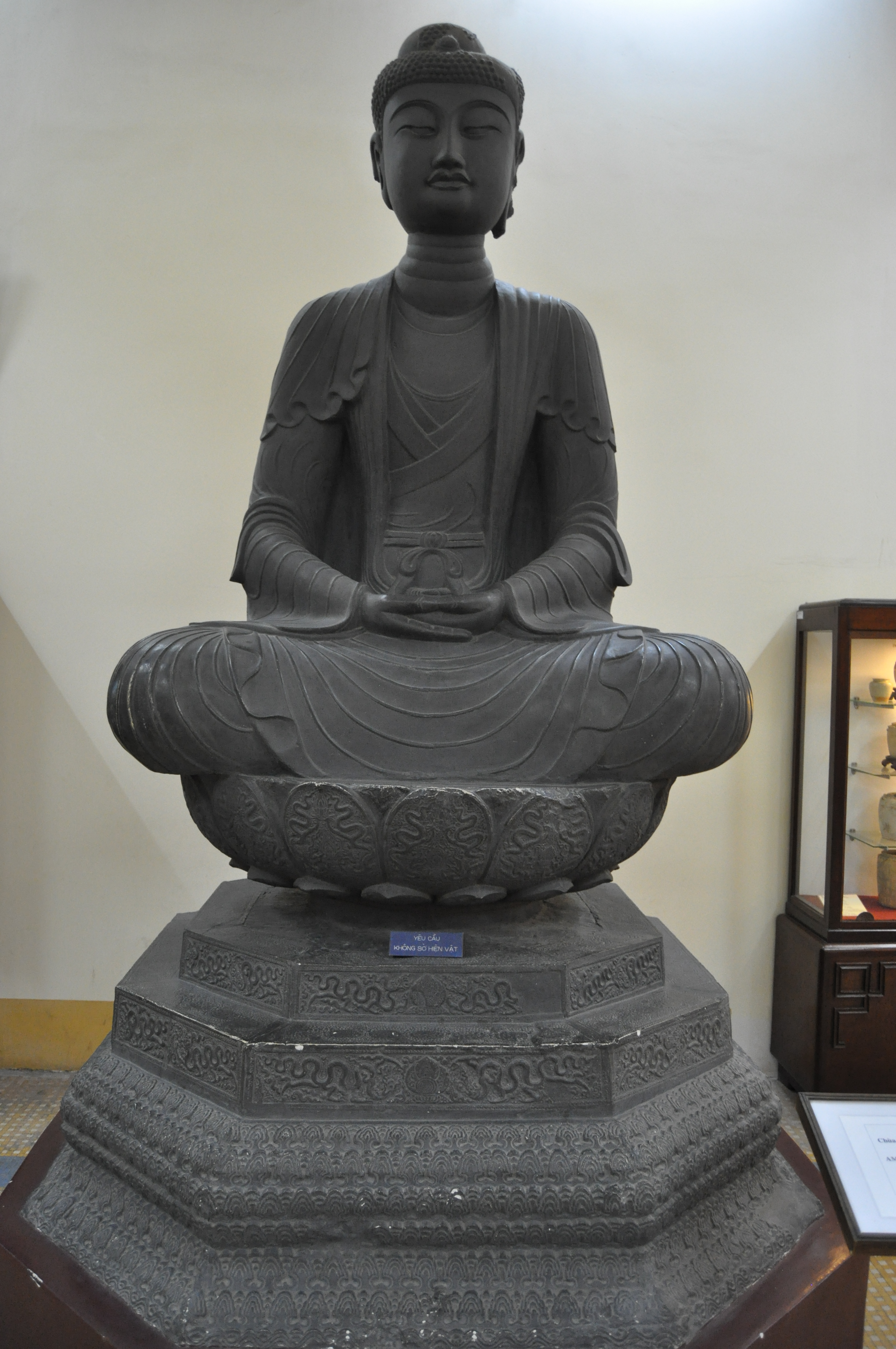
(Replica) Amitabha statue at Phật Tích temple, carved in 1057 during the Ly dynasty

The main religion of the Lý dynasty was Buddhism. The first Ly emperor was a Buddhist monk, and was patroned by Buddhist leaders. Ly emperors were fundraisers and sponsors of the Buddhist Sangha. Buddhism became the state religion as members of the imperial family and the nobility made pilgrimages, supported the building of pagodas, sometimes even entered monastic life, and otherwise took an active part in Buddhist practices. The kingdom was governed according to Buddhist ideas and laws. Emperors built pagodas to commemorate military victories, such as when Lý Thường Kiệt had defeated the Song, the Bao An pagoda was built to show gratitude for the Buddha.

Along with Buddhism, the emperors also participated in other religious ceremonies involving local spirits, gods of Indra and Brahma. Shrines were built dedicating to the Trung sisters and the king-of-king Phung Hung. Monastic members became a privileged landed class, exempt from taxes and military duty. A stone inscription dated 1209 from Bao An Temple retells the emperor donated 126 acres of land to the clergy, three to pagoda keepers and spiritual festivals. Other inscriptions and runic stones also describe the important role of Buddhism in the monarchy and Vietnamese society.

Emperor Lý Thánh Tông ordered the Temple of Literature to be built, and commissioned the statues of the Duke of Zhou and Confucius.

== Fashion ==
=== Nobility ===
The Emperor wore a golden robe, purple trousers and wore his hair in a bun fastened with a golden brooch. The court officials and aristocrats wore a dark tunic having four flaps, closely buttoned collar, dark trousers, and wore a bun with an iron brooch. On their heads they wore a black gauze chuddar and peaked cap. They also wore leather sandals and carried fans of stork feathers. The military uniforms were “dau mau” cap covering the ears, knee-length tunic, neatly sewn sleeves tightly fitted around the wrist. The whole of the frock was covered with small pieces of armor plate full of spiral designs, or patterns of multiple large petalled flowers at the chest. In addition, there were patterns of parallel curved brims or spiral designs below which hung small bells, drooping fringes, and finally a line of bells. For some other kinds of frocks, the shoulder straps were adorned with bells, and the two shoulder bands and waistband decorated with tiger-face designs. The surface of the frock was decorated with prominent small multi-petalled flowers. The fabric had a tiled or scaled pattern, which might have been embroidered or woven into the fabric. A waistband made of cloth was tied with the ends dropping to the front. If a leather waistband was worn, it would be tightly fastened around the belly to reveal the body muscles. The boots reached up to the knee and were simply decorated.

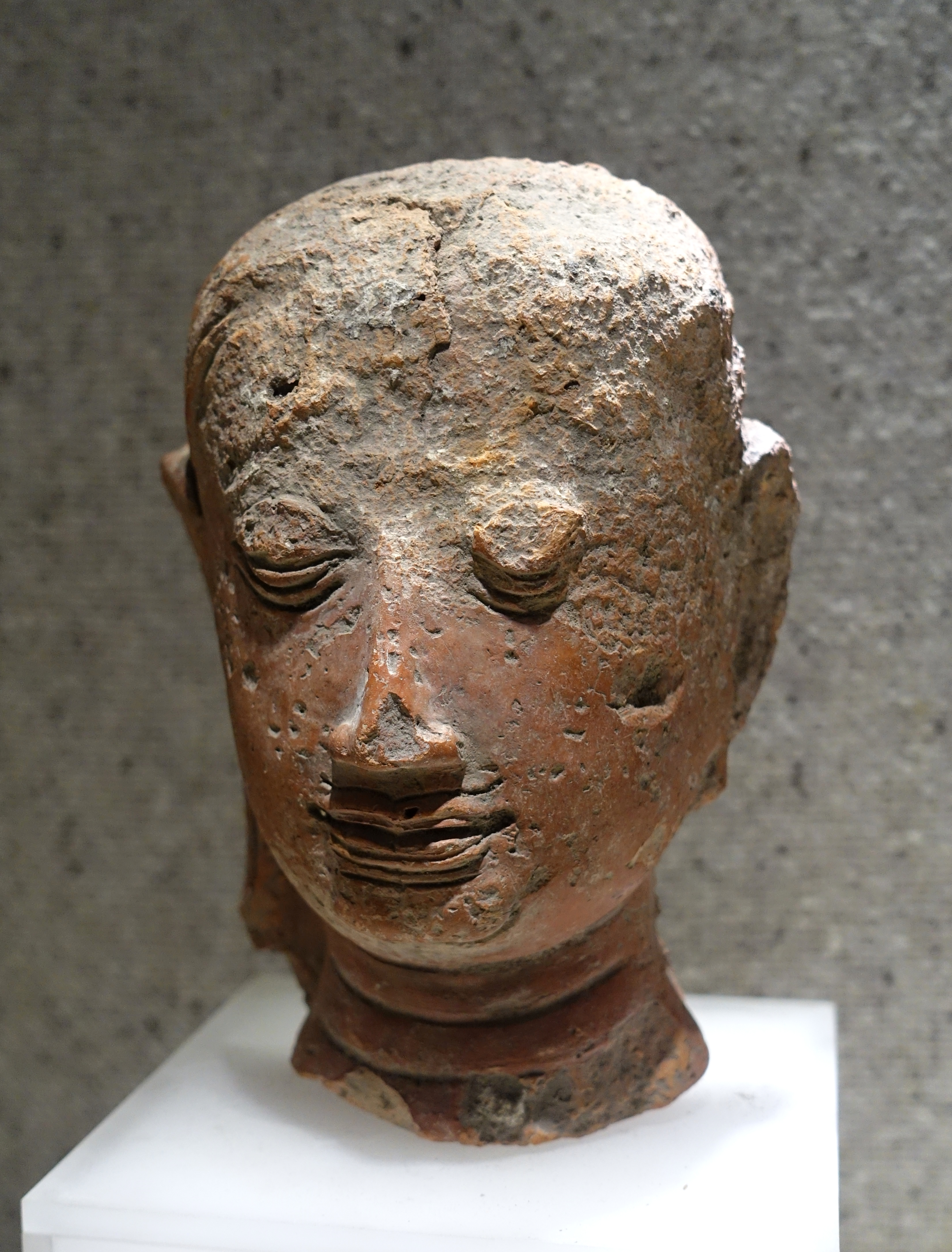
Vietnamese terracotta head of Buddha

Female dancers had a “skyward” bun, a decorative fringe of hair on the forehead, with flowers adorning the hair. They wore bracelets, strings of beads, as well as multi-pleated short skirts. The musician's costumes were quite original. A cap fully covered the hair, with a high and zigzag-fringed top. The inner shirt was with long sleeves, tight at the wrist. Added to that, there was a short-sleeved shirt, with vân kiên shards. They wore wide embroidered and fringed strips of cloth around the waist. On their calves were leggings, and covering the feet were pointed-toe canvas shoes.

Tattooing remained a custom during this period, a common practice for the King and his soldiers as well. The Imperial Guards tattooed distinctive marks on their chest and legs, as well as dragon patterns. Similar to the Anterior Lê Dynasty, they would brand the three words Thiên tử quân on the forehead. The armor of military leaders was also decorated with attached bells, which signaled that they were highly grateful to their benefactors. This was done in a spirit of national pride and the continuing development of traditional customs. There is a special statue from this period which shows a very refined dress style. The Buddha Amitabha statue, sometimes known as Buddhalokanatha statue, in Phật Tích Pagoda is a breathtakingly beautiful stone sculpture with sophisticated costuming. The ritual robe has curved, straight, zigzag or drooping fringes which make it full of movement. The robe's pleats rise like the veins of a lotus leaf, closely fitted to the body, and drop either vertically as a spring stream, or pliantly like waves in the ocean, even expanding horizontally in a gentle way. Although the statue is made of stone, the above features show that the robe was broad and made of smooth and delicate fabrics. The inner garment, a kind of tunic has a broad collar with crossed edges. The sleeves are very wide. The waistband, worn outside the tunic is tied into the shape of a horizontal Figure 8, with dropping straps.

== Chronicle ==
Thái Tổ
Thái Tông
Thánh Tông
Nhân Tông	Sùng Hiền hầu
Thần Tông
Anh Tông
Cao Tông
Huệ Tông
Chiêu Hoàng

== Gallery ==
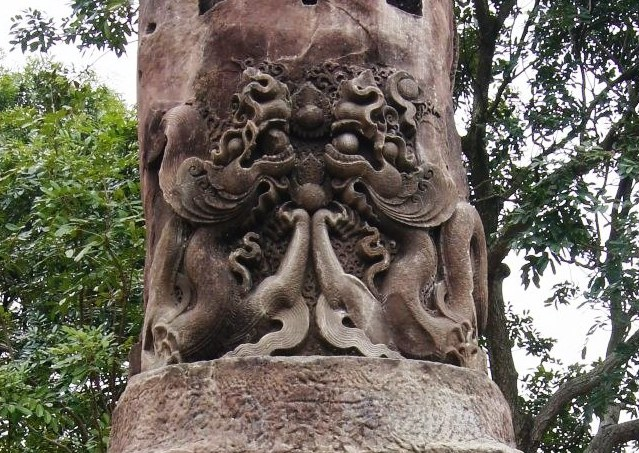
Ly dynasty dragons, Dạm Temple

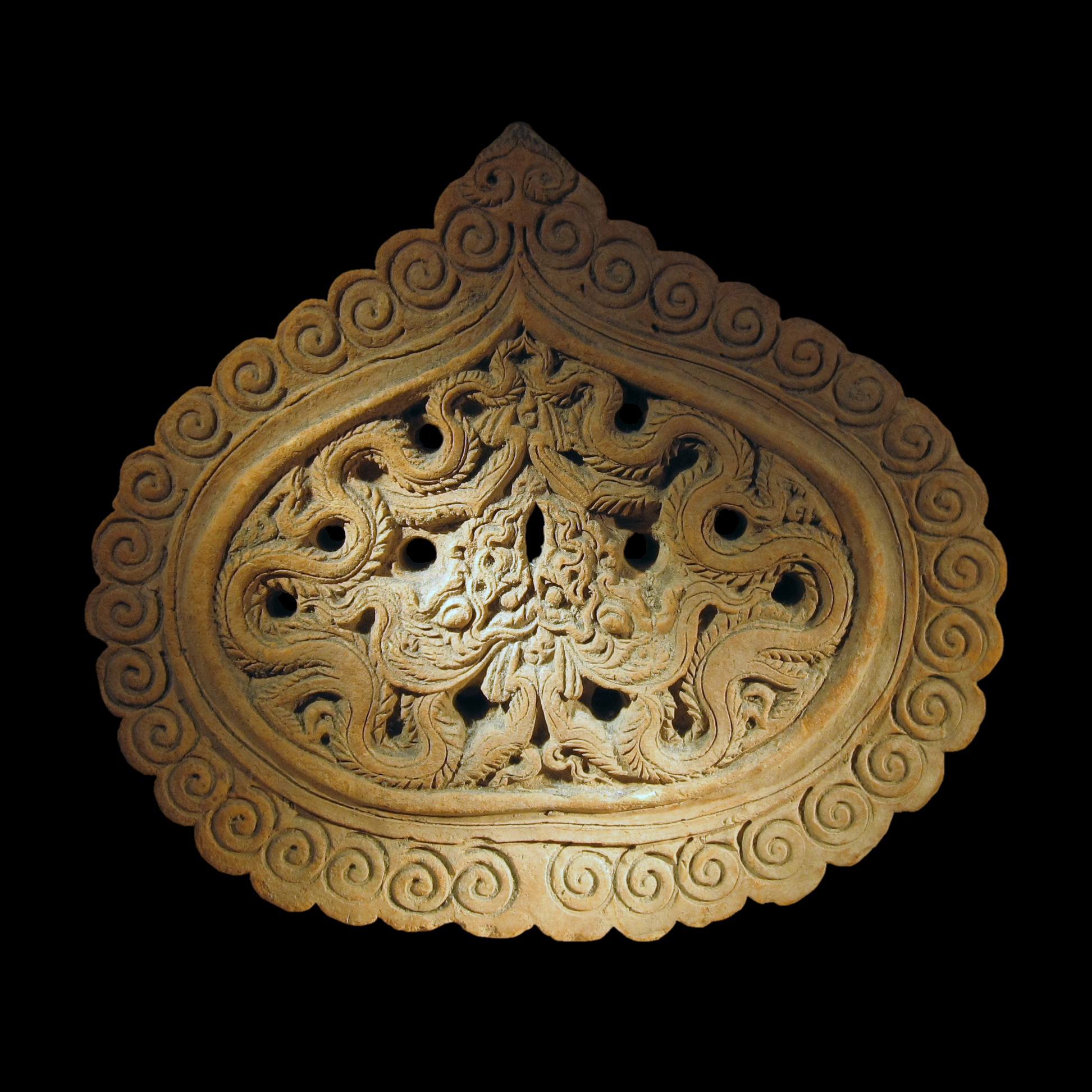
Bodhi tree leaf with dragon carving, a common decorative theme of Ly dynasty

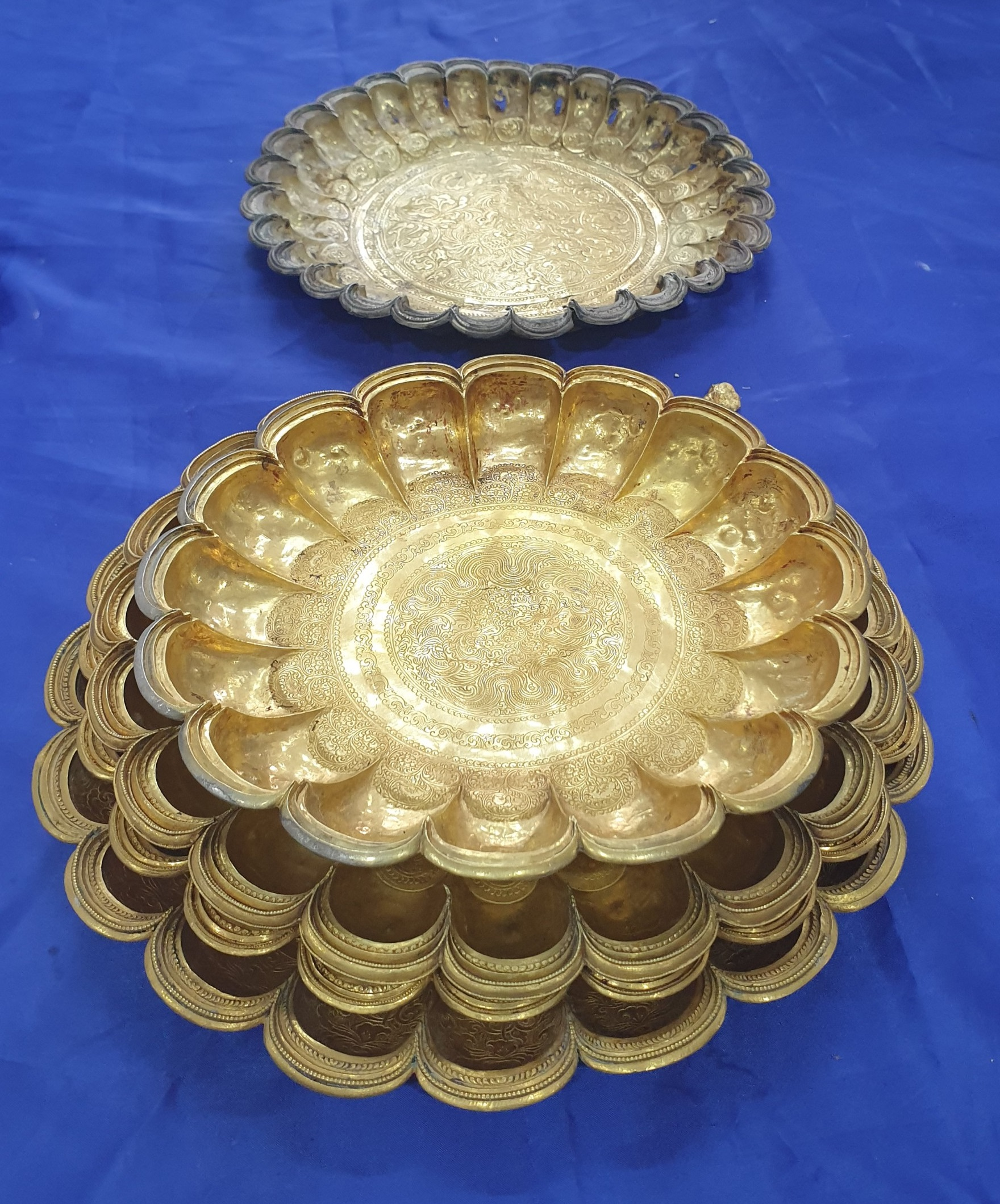
Imperial gold dishes, Hung Yen, 11th century

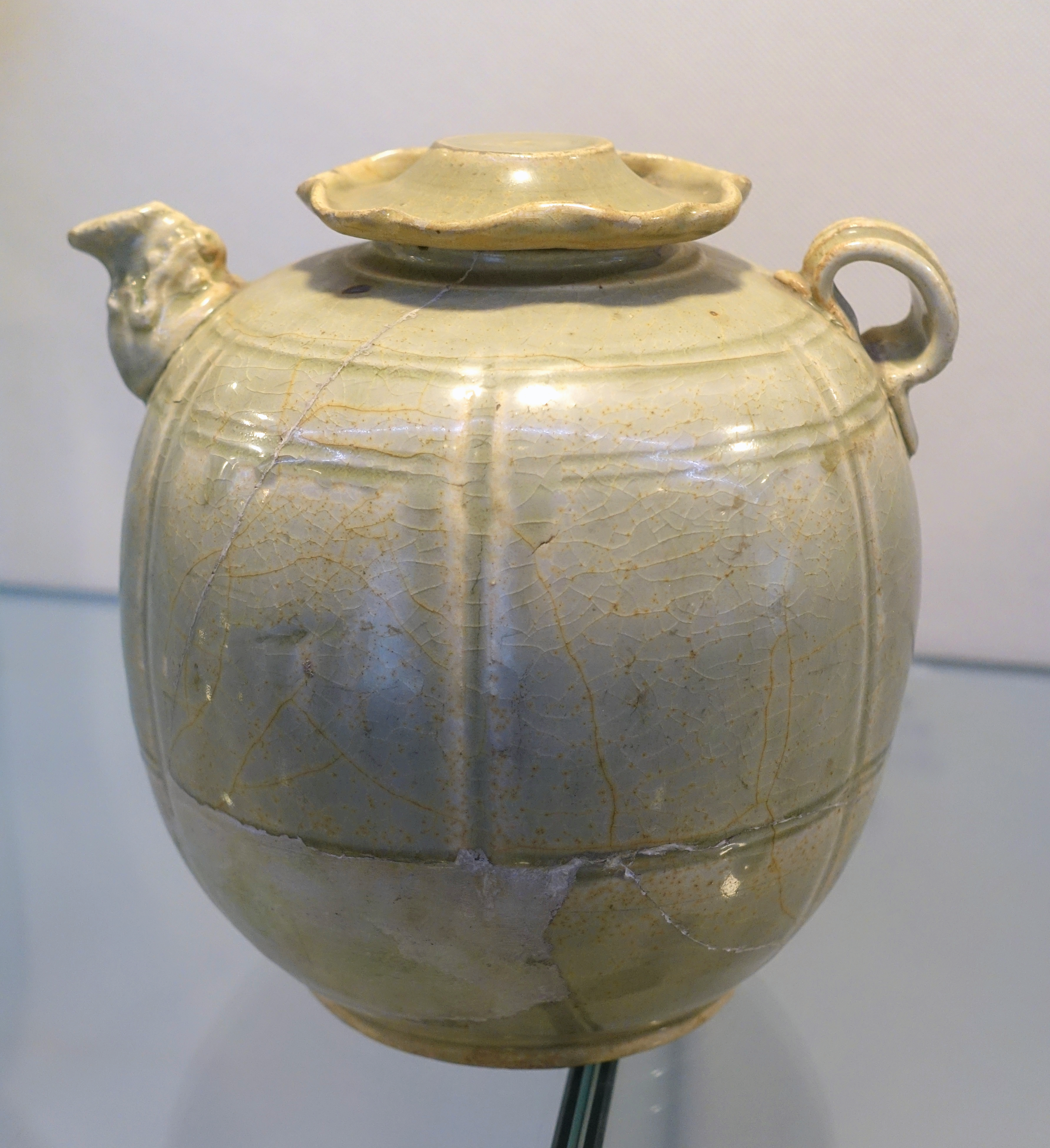
Celedon glaze ceramic teapot, 11th century

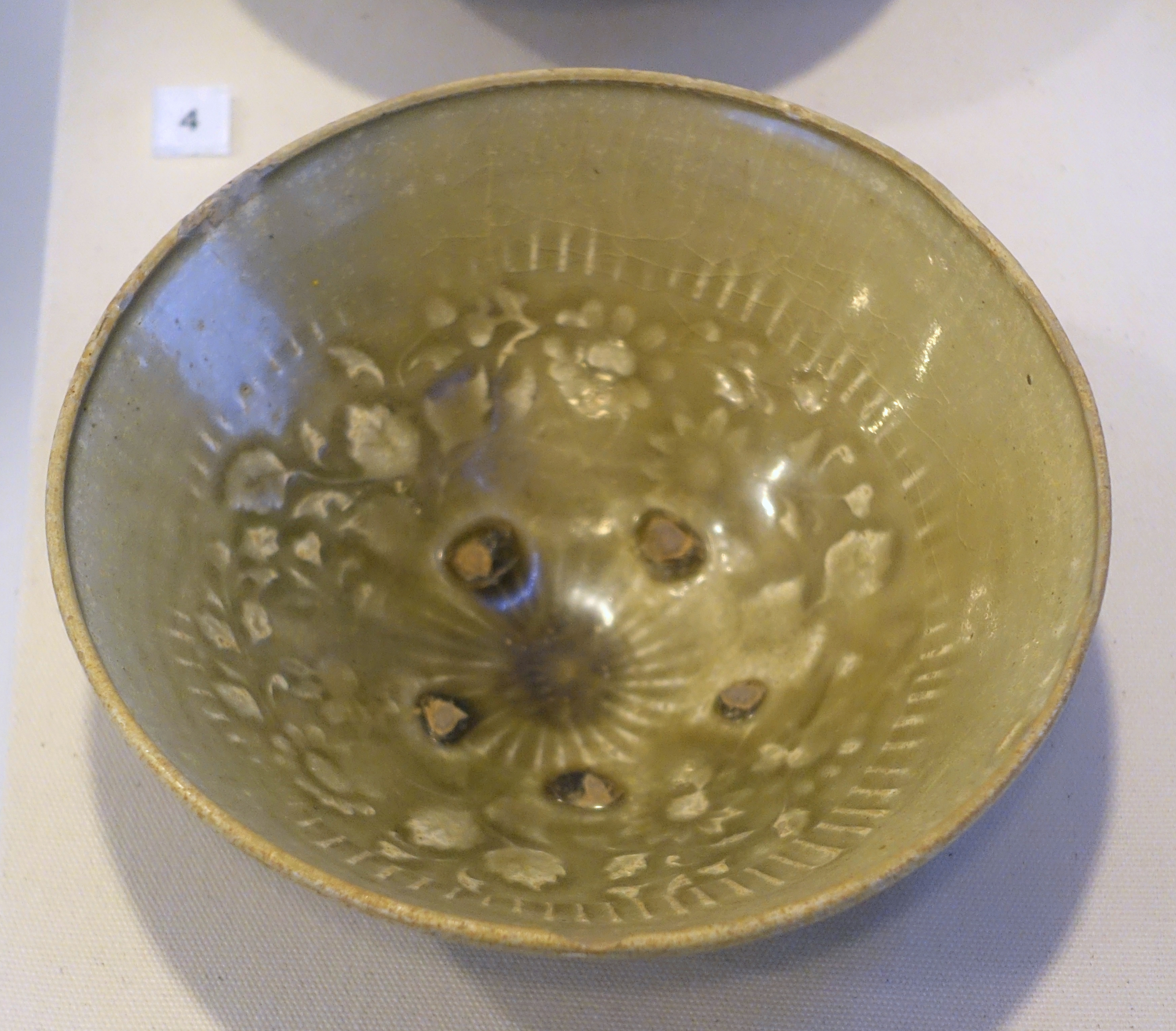
Celedon glaze ceramic, 11th century

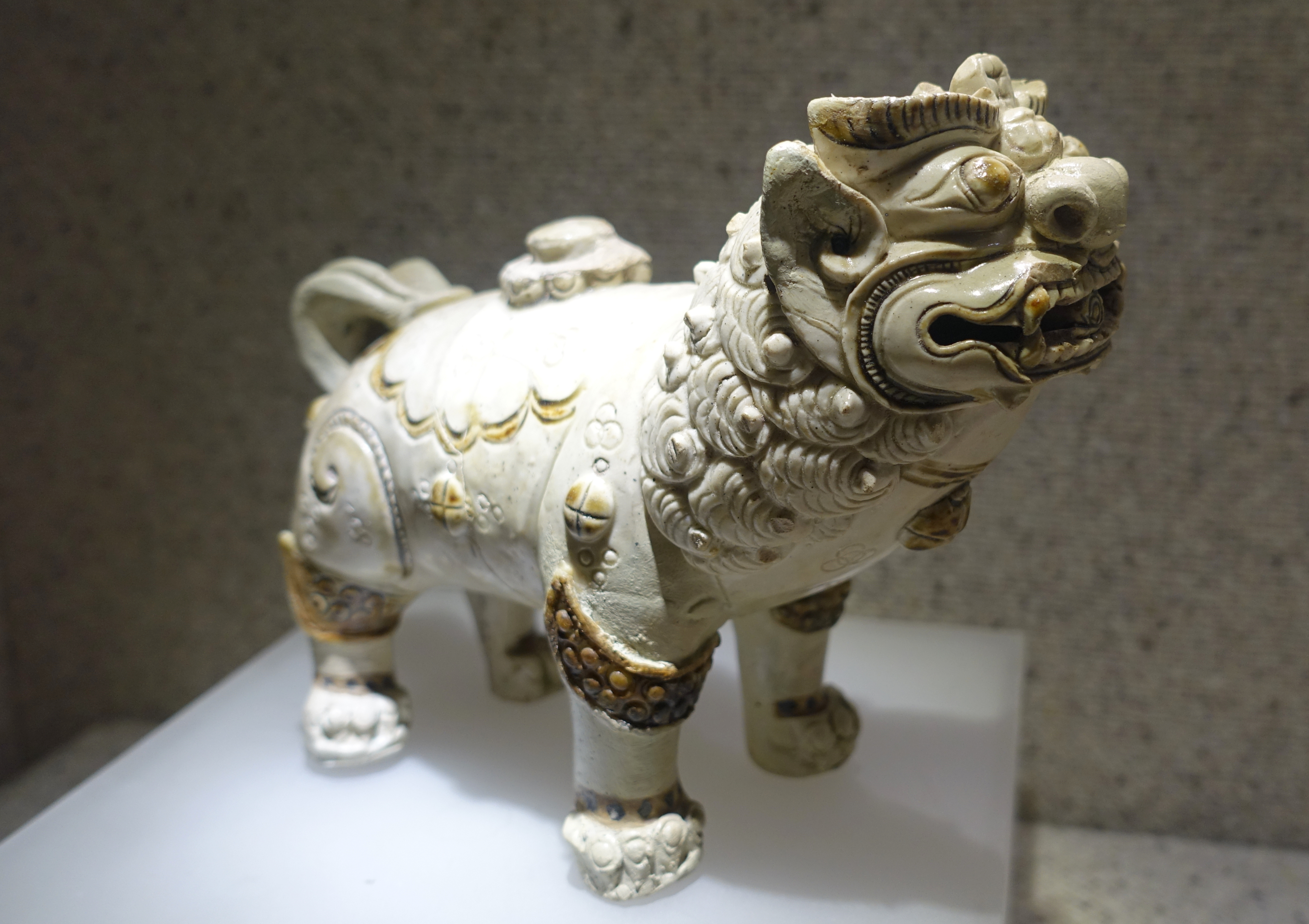
Ceramic lion, 11th century

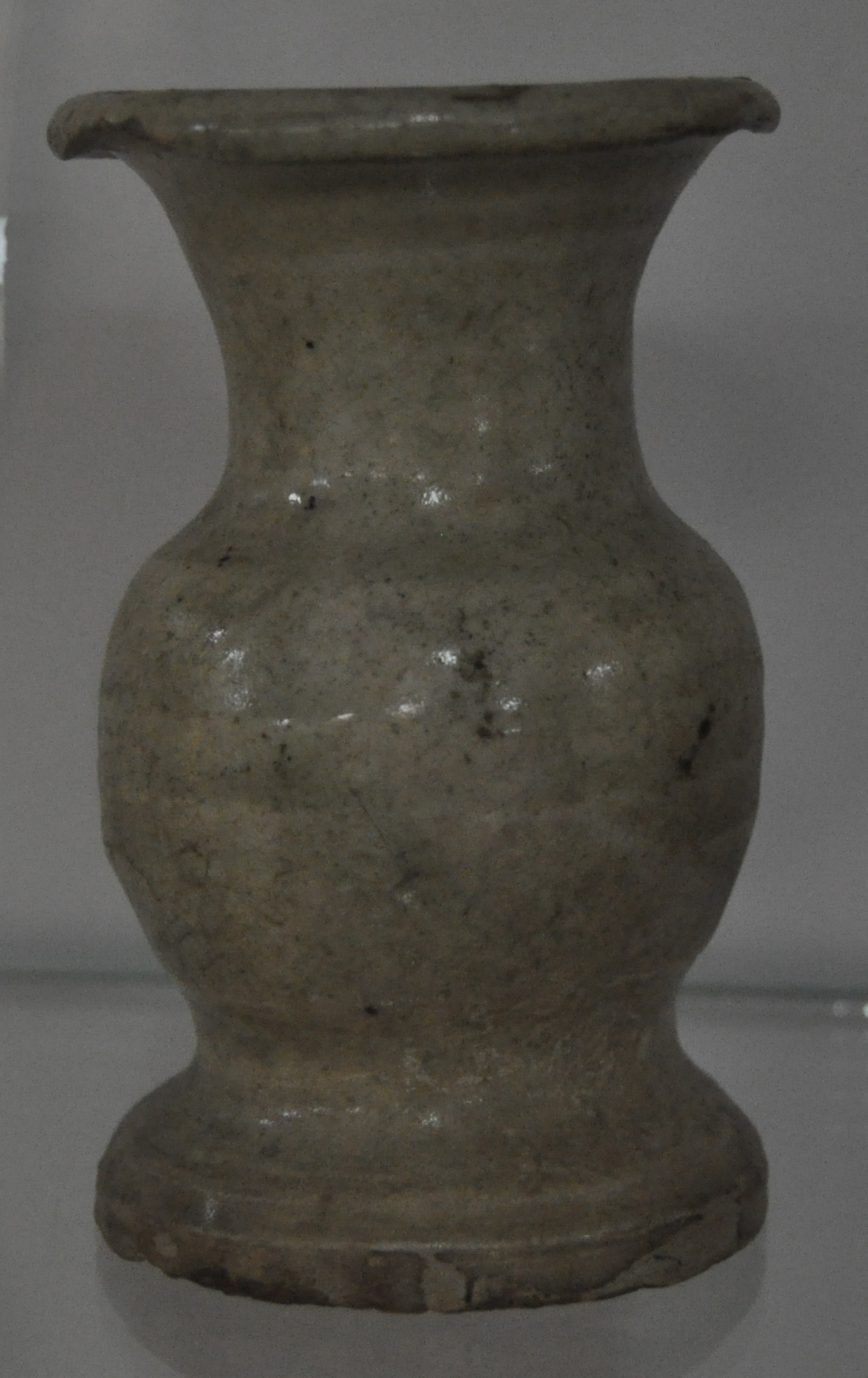
Ceramic vase, 11th–12th century

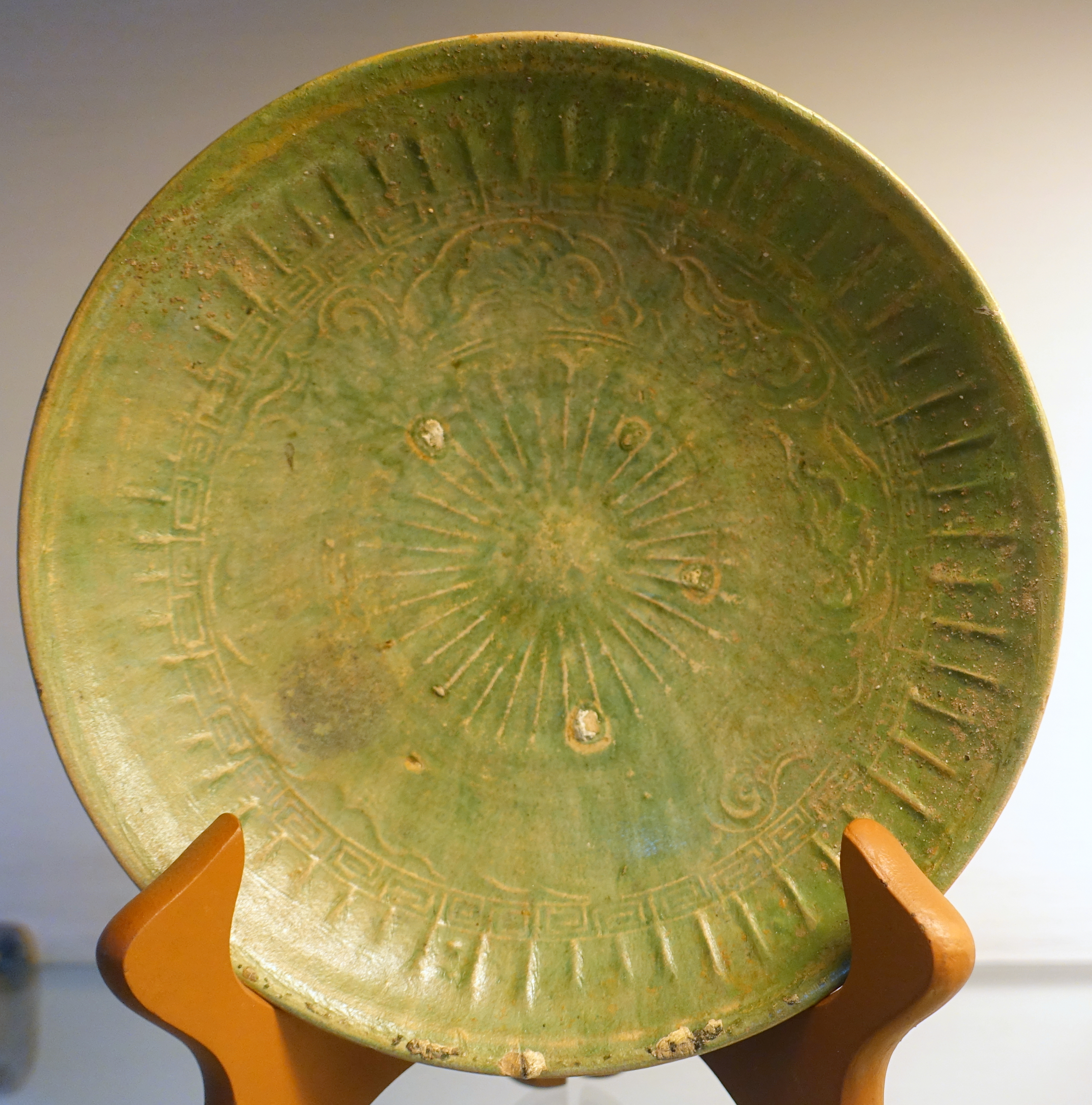
Ceramic dish, 11th–12th century

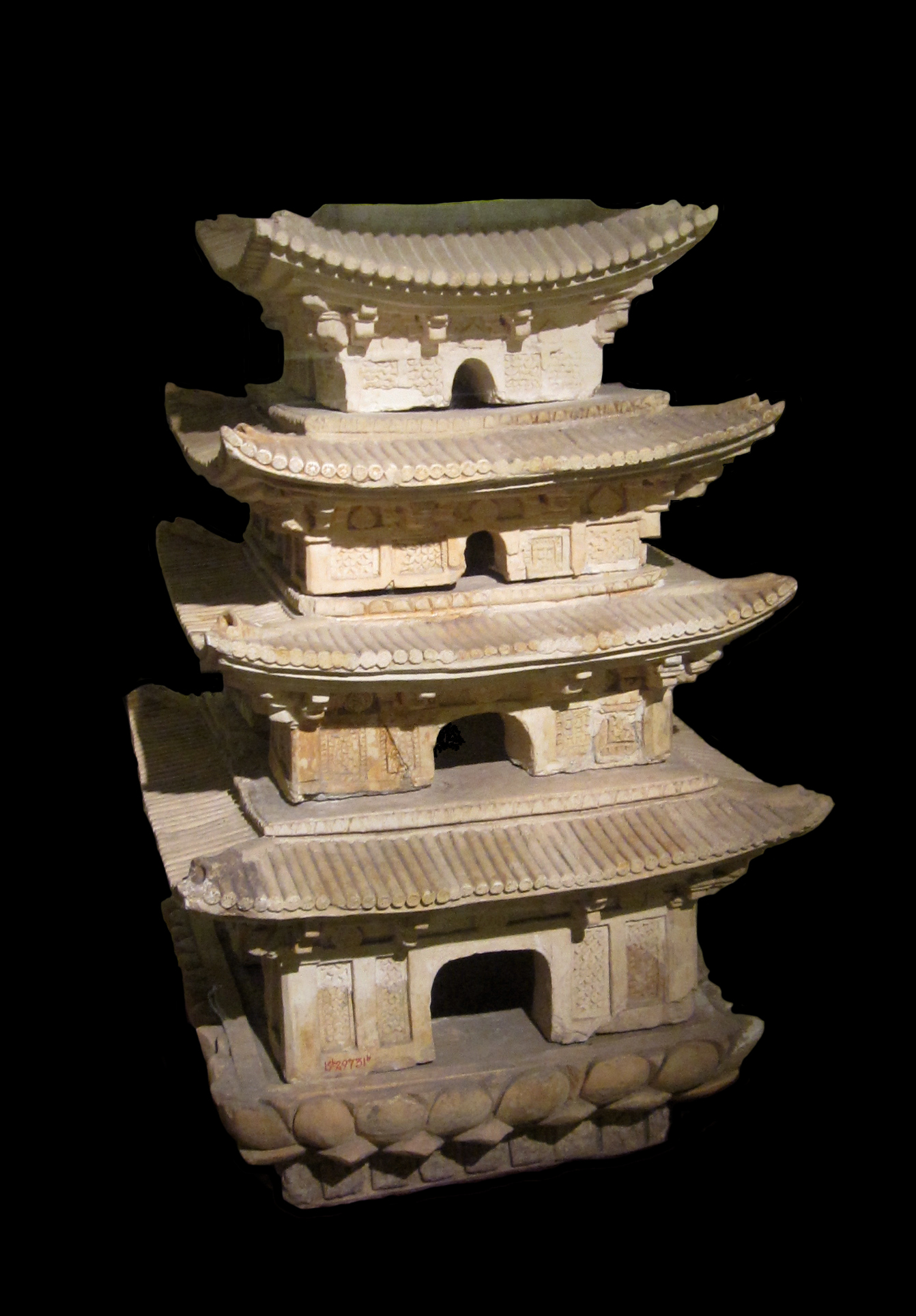
Terracotta pagoda model with lotus, bodhi leaf, dancer decoration, Hanoi (11th–13th century)

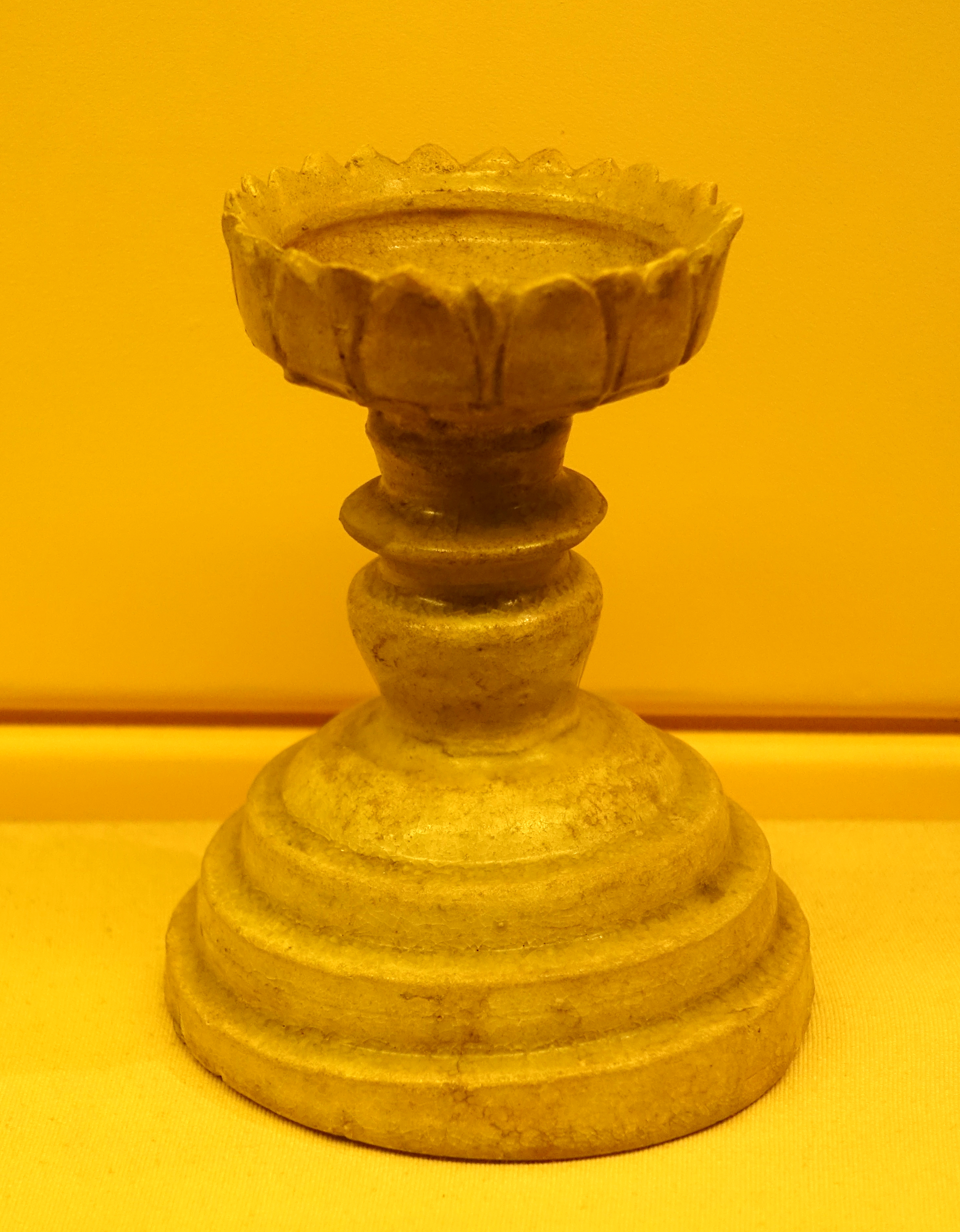
Oil lamp base, 11th–13th century

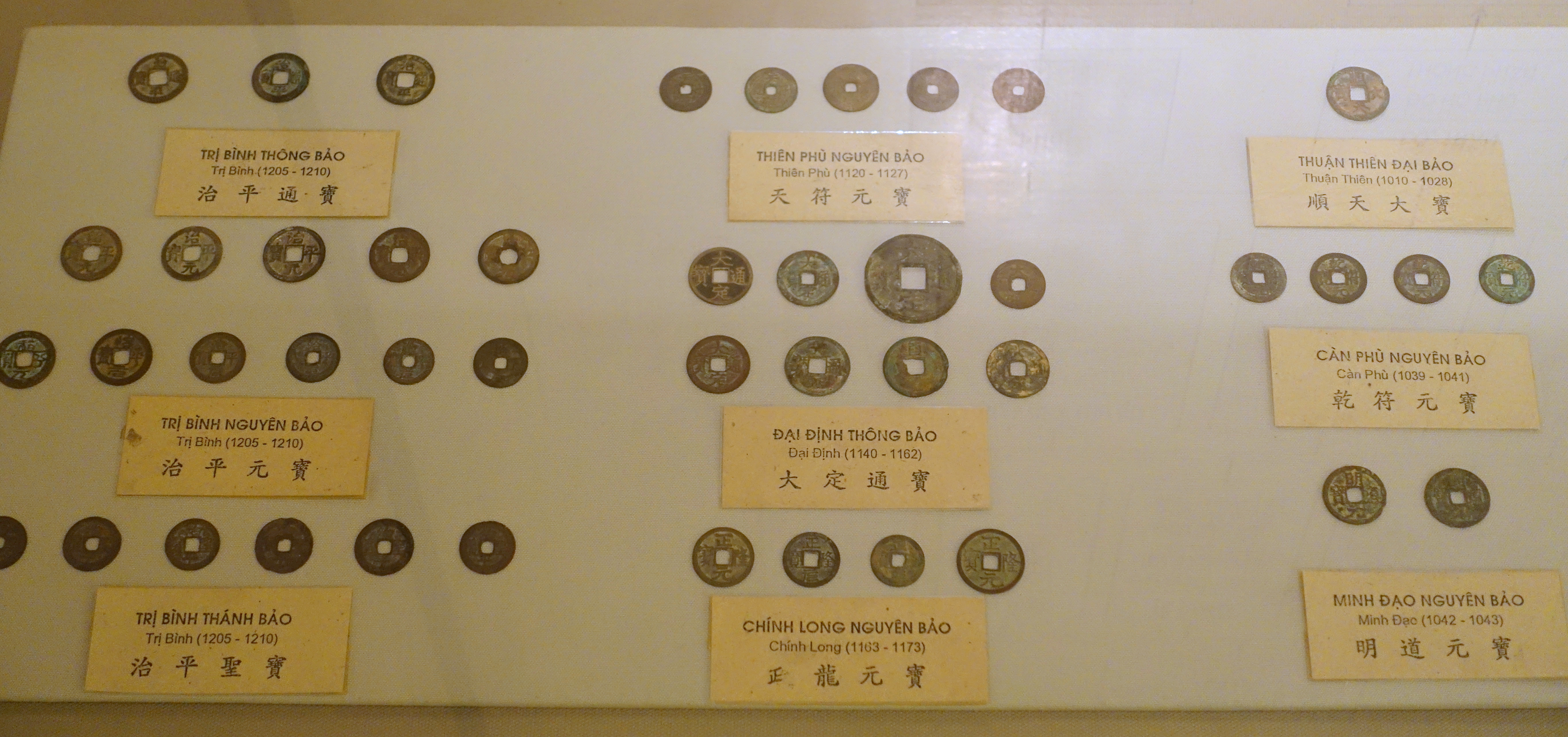
Coins of the Lý dynasty

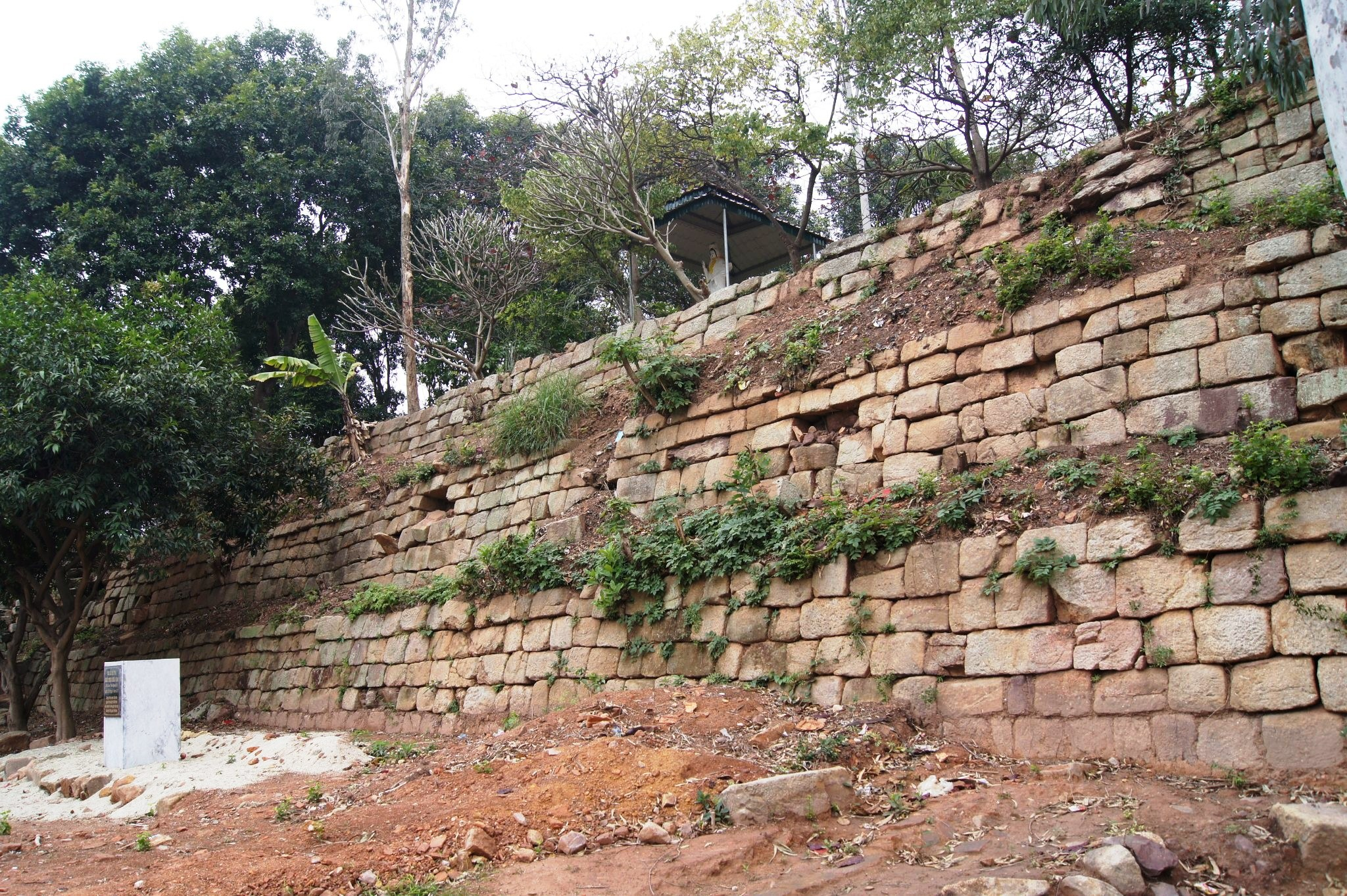
Old stone wall in Dạm pagoda, 11th century

== See also ==
- List of emperors of the Lý dynasty
