= Nguyễn Trãi =

Vietnamese scholar and poet (1380–1442)

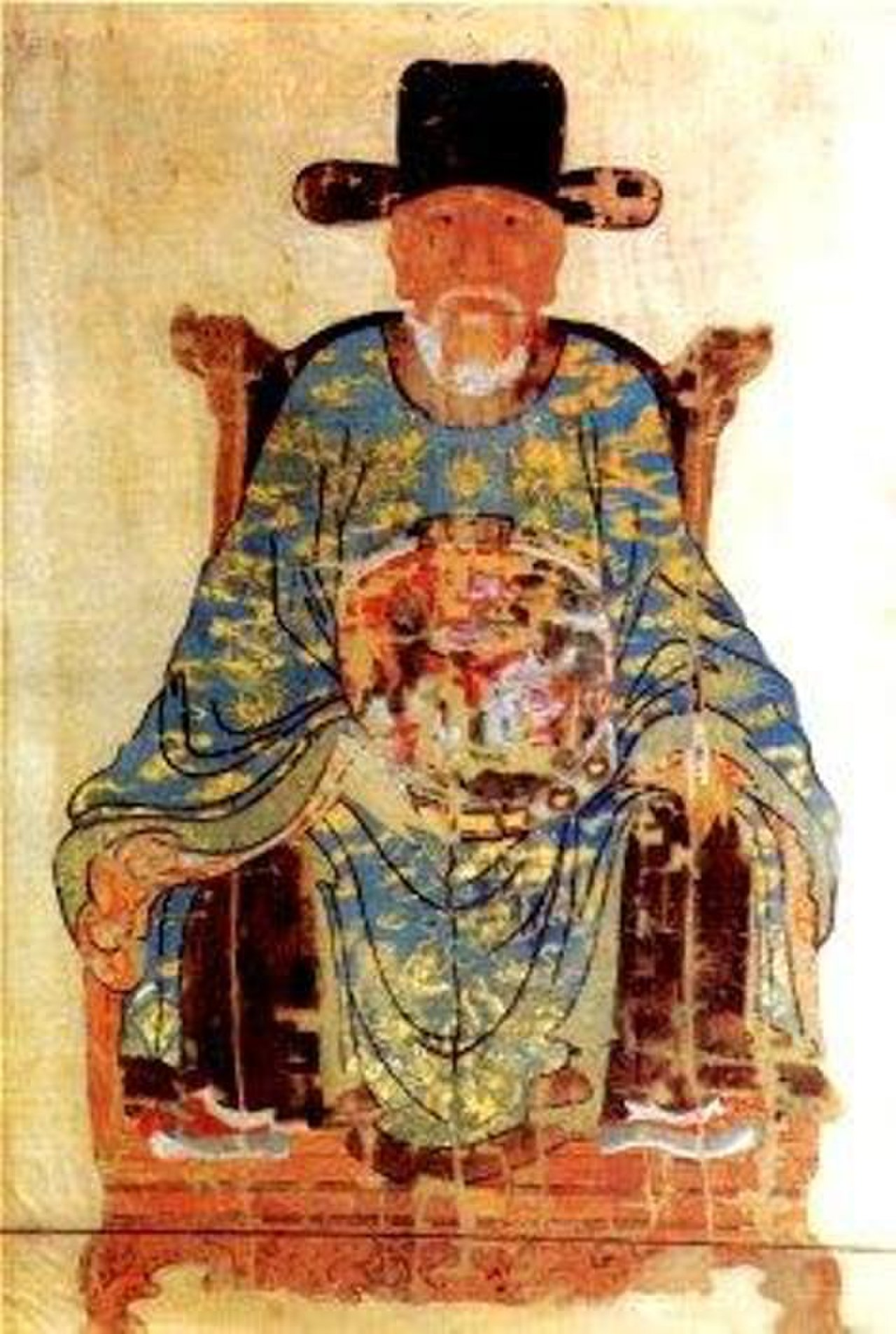

Vietnamese name
- Vietnamese: Nguyễn Trãi
- Hán-Nôm: 阮廌

Nguyễn Trãi (阮廌), pen name Ức Trai (抑齋); (1380–1442) was a Vietnamese poet and politician. He was at times attributed with being capable of almost miraculous or mythical deeds in his designated capacity as a principal advisor of Lê Lợi, who fought against the Ming dynasty. He is credited with writing the political statements of Lê Lợi and convincing the Vietnamese populace to support open rebellion against the Ming dynasty rulers. He is also the author of "Great Proclamation upon the Pacification of the Wu" (Bình Ngô đại cáo). He was a Confucian scholar.

== Biography ==
=== Early life ===
Nguyễn Trãi originally was from Hải Dương Province, he was born in 1380 in Thăng Long (present day Hanoi), the capital of the declining Trần dynasty. Under the brief Hồ dynasty, he passed examination and served for a time in the government. In 1406, Ming forces invaded and conquered Vietnam. Under the occupation, the Ming China attempted to convert Vietnam into a Chinese province and ruthlessly quashed all rebellions.

=== War of independence ===
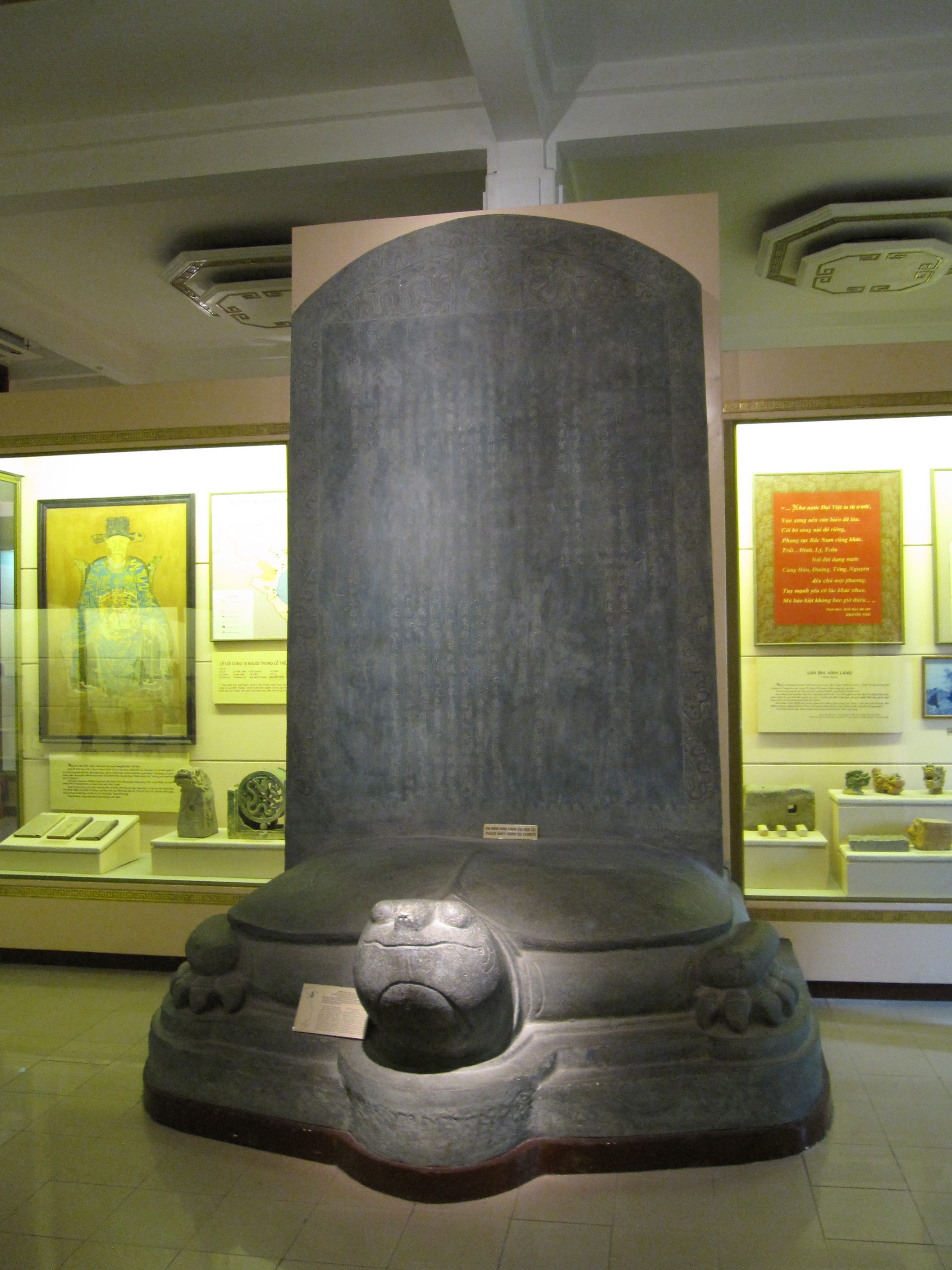
Vĩnh Lăng stele (replica). Stone, erected in the 6th year of Thuận Thiên reign (1433). Early Lê dynasty, ancient capital of Lam Kinh, Thanh Hóa Province, central Vietnam. Inscribed by Nguyễn Trãi. Commemorative element. Inscription showed on biography of Lê Lợi, leader of Lam Son uprising (1418-1427) against Ming invaders from China, from beginning to final victory and him becoming the first emperor of the Early Lê dynasty in 1428. This stele is also one of typical stone sculptures of Vietnam fine art in the 15th century. National Museum of Vietnamese History, Hanoi.

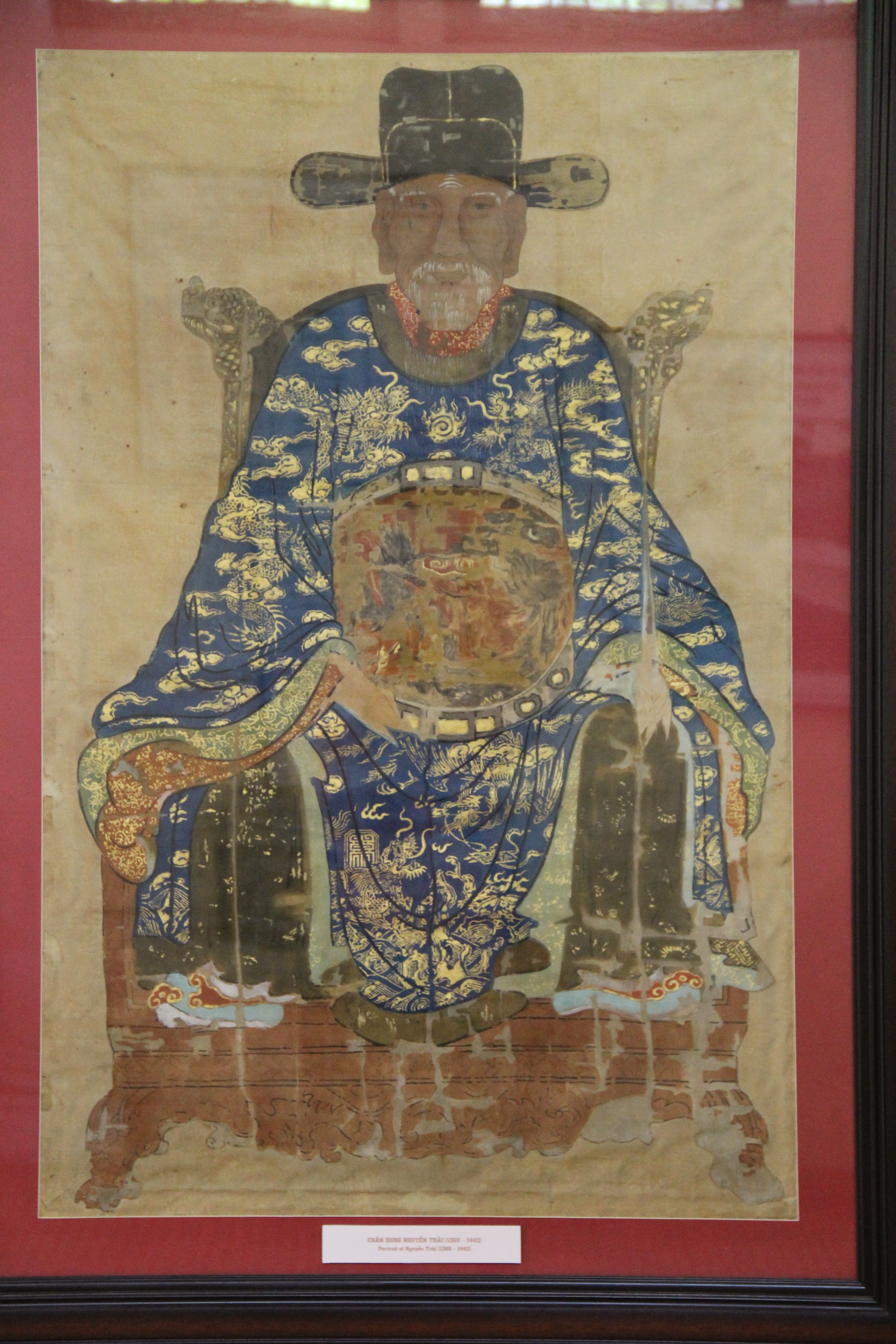
Portrait of Nguyễn Trãi.

In 1417, Nguyễn Trãi joined a rebel leader named Lê Lợi, who was resisting the occupation from a mountainous region in Thanh Hóa Province south of Hanoi. Nguyễn Trãi served as the chief advisor, strategist and propagandist for the movement.

The war of independence leading to the defeat of the Ming and the inauguration of the Lê dynasty lasted from 1417 to 1427. From 1417 until 1423, Lê Lợi conducted a classic guerilla campaign from his bases in the mountains. Following a negotiated truce, Lê Lợi, following the advice of Nguyễn Chích, led his army to the southern prefecture of Nghệ An. From Nghệ An, Vietnamese forces won many battles and gained control over the whole part of Vietnam from Thanh Hóa southwards. The Ming sent a series of military reinforcements in response to bolster their positions. In 1426, the army of a Chinese general named Wang Tong arrived in the Red River Delta. However, Vietnamese forces were able to cut supply lines and control the countryside, leaving Chinese presence totally isolated in the capital and other citadels. During this period, Nguyễn Trãi sought to undermine the resolve of the enemy and to negotiate a favorable peace by sending a series of missives to the Ming commanders. In 1427 the Ming emperor Xuande sent two large reinforcing armies to Vietnam. Lê Lợi moved his forces to the frontier, where they confronted and utterly defeated Chinese reinforcements in a series of bloody battles, most notably the battle of Chi Lăng-Xương Giang. Wang Tong sued for peace. The numerous Chinese prisoners of war were all given provisions and allowed to return to China. Nguyễn Trãi penned a famous proclamation of victory.

=== Later life ===
After the war Nguyễn Trãi was elevated by Lê Lợi to an exalted position in the new court but internal intrigues, sycophantic machinations and clannish nepotism meant he was not appointed regent upon the emperor's death. Instead that position was bestowed upon Lê Sát, who ruled as regent on behalf of the young heir Lê Thái Tông.

At some point during the regency of Lê Sát, having found life at court increasingly difficult, Nguyễn Trãi retired to his country home north of Hanoi in the tranquil mountains of Chí Linh, where he enjoyed poetry writing and meditation. Today, visitors can visit this site where a large shrine of remembrance, covering from the foot of the mountain to the top is erected to honour the national hero. The site of Nguyễn Trãi's house still exists, however only the tiled floors remain original. Close by is an ancient Buddhist temple, which has stood there several centuries before his time.

== Death ==
Nguyễn Trãi's death resulted from a scandal involving the young emperor, Lê Thái Tông, and the wife or concubine of Nguyễn Trãi, named Nguyễn Thị Lộ. Early in 1442, the young emperor began an affair with Nguyễn Thị Lộ. This affair continued when the emperor visited the old scholar at his home. Not long after having left, Lê Thái Tông suddenly became ill and died. The nobles at the court blamed Nguyễn Thị Lộ for the young emperor's death, accused her and Nguyễn Trãi of regicide and had both, along with most members of their extended families, executed.

Twenty years later, Lê Thái Tông's son, emperor Lê Thánh Tông officially pardoned Nguyễn Trãi, saying that he was wholly innocent in the death of Thánh Tông's father. He was given the posthumous noble title the Count of Tán Trù.

== Legacy ==
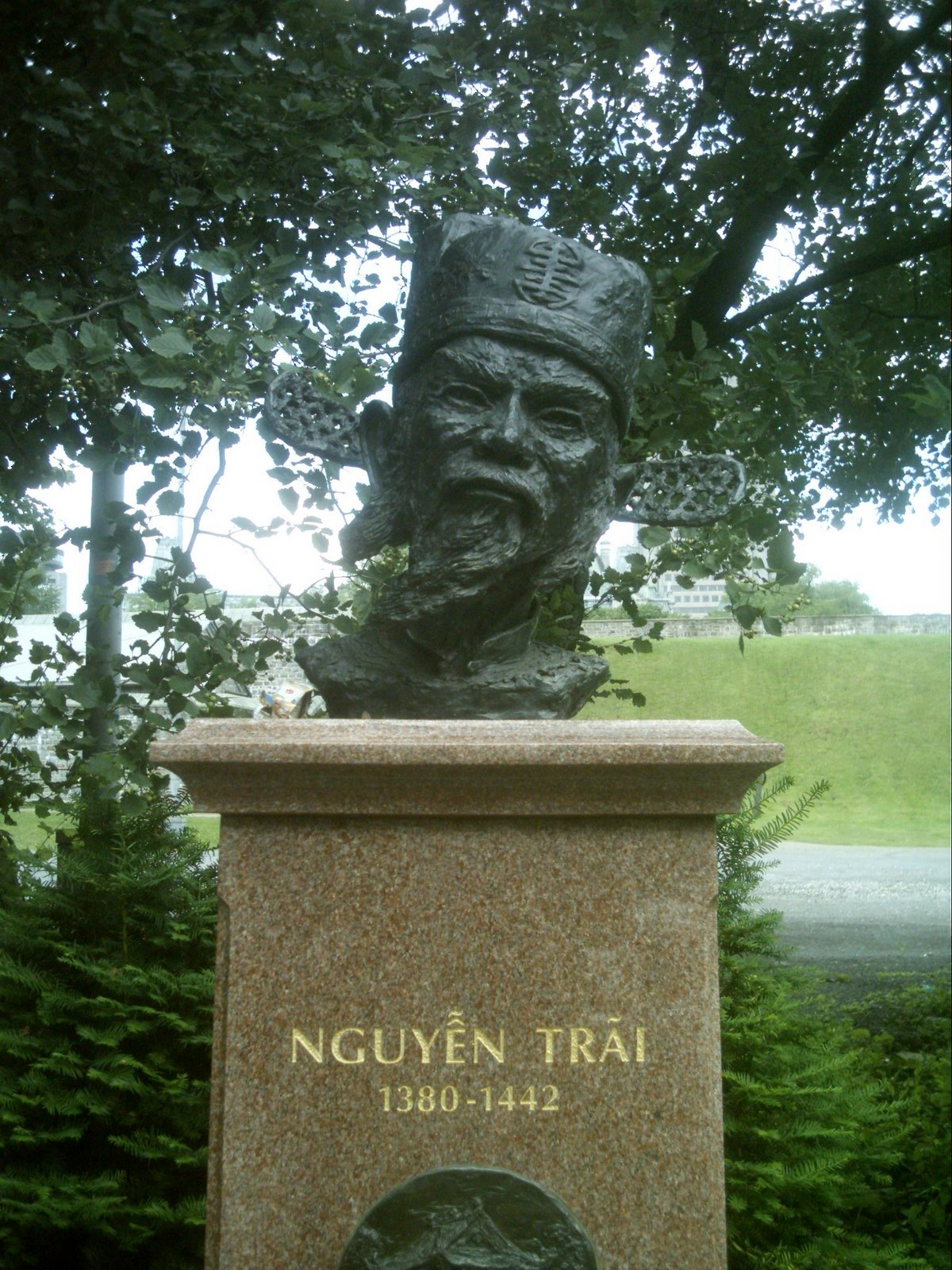
Nguyễn Trãi, monument in Quebec City

According to Loren Baritz ("Backfire: A History of How American Culture Led Us Into Vietnam and Made Us Fight the Way We Did", 1985), Trai set down the Vietnamese strategy against the Chinese in an essay. This essay would prove to be very close to the Communists' strategy of insurgency. Specifically you must, "subordinate military action to the political and moral struggle...better to conquer hearts than citadels."

Most cities in Vietnam have named major streets after him.

== Family ==
Nguyễn Trãi had five wives (or concubines) and seven sons.

Wives/concubines:

- Lady Phạm Đỗ Minh Hiển
- Lady Phùng Thành
- Lady Nguyễn Thị Lộ
- Lady Phạm Thị Mẫn
- Lady Trần Anh Minh

Sons:

- Nguyễn Khuê (Lady Trần's)
- Nguyễn Ứng (Lady Trần's)
- Nguyễn Phù (Lady Trần's)
- Nguyễn Bảng (Lady Phùng's)
- Nguyễn Tích (Lady Phùng's)
- Nguyễn Anh Vũ (Lady Phạm's)
- Forefather of a Nguyễn family's branch in Quế Lĩnh, Phương Quất, Kinh Môn District, Hải Dương Province. (Lady Lê's)

Notable descendants:

- Nguyễn Thiện Thuật
- Nguyễn Văn Cừ

== Work ==
Being both a military tactician and a poet, Nguyễn Trãi's works varied in many areas ranging from literature, history, geography, ceremony and propriety; many of them were missing after his execution. Most of his poems that survive until today were collected in Ức Trai Thi Tập (Ức Trai's Poems Collection) by Dương Bá Cung, printed in 1868 under Nguyễn dynasty. His poems, written in both ancient Chinese (Hán) and Vietnamese (Nôm), were highly regarded by notable philosophers, poets, and politicians in Vietnamese history.

In 2010, Vietnamese poet Nguyễn Đỗ and American poet Paul Hoover published the first collection of Nguyễn Trãi's poetry in English translation, titled Beyond the Court Gate: Selected Poems. The collection reflects Nguyễn Trãi's metaphysical contemplation of tiny details in everyday life, but at the same time set him apart from Li Po's uses of extreme imaginary and formal poetic rules. Nguyễn Trãi's poems demonstrate wit, humility, and a conversational tone, and express his personal perception and experience.

An example of Nguyễn Trãi's writing is his poem To a Friend (Traditional Chinese: 記友, Sino-Vietnamese: Kí Hữu, Vietnamese: Gửi Bạn), as translated and edited by Nguyễn Đỗ and Paul Hoover:

記友
半生世路嘆屯邅，
萬事惟應付老天。
寸舌但存空自信，
一寒如故亦堪憐。
光陰焂忽時難再，
客舍凄涼夜似年。
十載讀書貧到骨，
盤惟苜蓿坐無氈。

To a Friend
My fate naturally has many twists and sharp turns,
So in everything I trust in the wisdom of Heaven.
I still have my tongue—believe me, I am able to talk,
Even though I'm still poor and, as we know, pathetic.
Never to return, the past flies too quickly and the time is short,
But, wandering in this cold room, the night is far too long.
I’ve been reading books for ten years, but I'm poor from clothes to bone
From eating only vegetables and sitting without a cushion.

== Footnotes ==
- Media related to Nguyễn Trãi at Wikimedia Commons

Trần imperial family

Colour note	Emperor, Empress Regnant, Retired Emperor	Prince	Princess

Trần Kinh
Trần Hấp
Trần Lý	Trần Hoằng Nghi
Trần Tự Khánh	Trần Thừa	Lý Huệ Tông	Trần Thị Dung	Trần Thủ Độ
Princess Thuận Thiên
Trần Liễu	Trần Thái Tông
Princess Chiêu Thánh	Lê Phụ Trần
Tuệ Trung	Trần Hưng Đạo	Trần Quốc Khang	Trần Thánh Tông	Trần Ích Tắc	Trần Quang Khải	Trần Nhật Duật
Phạm Ngũ Lão	Princess Anh Nguyên	Trần Quốc Tảng	Trần Nhân Tông	Trần Khánh Dư	Trần Đạo Tái	Princess An Tư
Princess Huyền Trân	Trần Quốc Chẩn	Trần Anh Tông	Trần Văn Bích	Princess Thụy Bảo
Trần Minh Tông	Trần Nguyên Đán	Trần Bình Trọng
Prince Cung Túc	Trần Hiến Tông	Trần Dụ Tông	Trần Nghệ Tông	Trần Duệ Tông	Trần Thị Thái	Nguyễn Phi Khanh
Dương Nhật Lễ	Prince Trang Định	Giản Định Đế	Trần Thuận Tông	Trần Phế Đế	Nguyễn Trãi
Trùng Quang Đế	Trần Thiếu Đế

Notes:
- Ngô Sĩ Liên (1993), Đại Việt sử ký toàn thư (in Vietnamese) (Nội các quan bản ed.), Hanoi: Social Science Publishing House
- National Bureau for Historical Record (1998), Khâm định Việt sử Thông giám cương mục (in Vietnamese), Hanoi: Education Publishing House
- Trần Trọng Kim (1971), Việt Nam sử lược (in Vietnamese), Saigon: Center for School Materials
- Chapuis, Oscar (1995), A history of Vietnam: from Hong Bang to Tu Duc, Greenwood Publishing Group, ISBN 0313296227

Family tree of Vietnamese monarchs
