= List of Vietnamese dynasties =

Prior to the abdication of Bảo Đại on 25 August 1945 during the August Revolution, Vietnam was ruled by a series of dynasties of either local or Chinese origin. The following is a list of major dynasties in the history of Vietnam.

== Background ==
=== Naming convention ===
In Vietnamese historiography, dynasties are generally known to historians by the family name of the monarchs. For example, the Đinh dynasty (Nhà Đinh; 茹丁) is known as such because the ruling clan bore the family name Đinh (丁).

Similar to Chinese dynasties, Vietnamese dynasties would adopt a quốc hiệu (國號; "name of the state") upon the establishment of the realm. However, as it was common for several dynasties to share the same official name, referring to regimes by their official name in historiography would be potentially confusing. For instance, the quốc hiệu "Đại Việt" (大越) was used by the Lý dynasty (since the reign of Lý Thánh Tông), the Trần dynasty, the Later Trần dynasty, the Later Lê dynasty, the Mạc dynasty, and the Tây Sơn dynasty.

In the Vietnamese language, the word for "dynasty" may be written as either nhà (茹) or triều (朝) depending on the context. The former is generally used to denote the ruling family whereas the latter refers to the dynastic regime. For instance, the Mạc dynasty can be rendered as "Nhà Mạc" (茹莫) or "Mạc triều" (莫朝).

=== Origin of dynasties ===
Apart from over one millennium of direct Chinese rule, Vietnam was ruled by a series of "local" dynasties, although some of which could have their origins traced to China.

The founder of the legendary Hồng Bàng dynasty, Lộc Tục, was recorded as a descendant of the mythical Chinese ruler Shennong.

According to two historical Vietnamese texts, the Complete Annals of Đại Việt and the Imperially-commissioned Annotated Text Reflecting the Complete History of Việt, Thục Phán of the Thục dynasty was from Sichuan, China, which was previously under the rule of the ancient Chinese State of Shu.

The Triệu dynasty, established by Zhao Tuo from the Chinese Qin dynasty, was considered an orthodox local regime by traditional Vietnamese historiography. However, modern Vietnamese historians generally regard the Triệu dynasty to be a foreign regime that ruled Vietnam.

The founder of the Early Lý dynasty, Lý Bôn, was descended from Chinese refugees who fled Wang Mang's seizure of power in the final years of the Western Han in China.

The first emperor of the Lý dynasty, Lý Công Uẩn, could have his paternal bloodline traced to modern-day Fujian, China. Lý Công Uẩn's father, Lý Thuần An, escaped to Quanzhou from Hebei after Lý Công Uẩn's grandfather, Li Song, was wrongly accused of treason and executed by the Emperor Yin of Later Han.

The origin of the Trần dynasty was traced to modern Fujian, where the ancestor of the Trần imperial clan, Trần Kính, migrated from in the 11th century CE. The Later Trần dynasty was ruled by the same imperial clan as the earlier Trần dynasty.

The Hồ dynasty was ruled by the Hồ family which migrated from present-day Zhejiang, China to Vietnam under the leadership of Hồ Hưng Dật during the 10th century CE. The Hồ dynasty claimed descent from the Duke Hu of Chen, the founder of the ancient Chinese State of Chen. The Duke Hu of Chen was in turn descended from the legendary Emperor Shun, who was recognized by Hồ Quý Ly as the progenitor of the Hồ imperial family. Accordingly, the Hồ dynasty adopted the official quốc hiệu "Đại Ngu" (大虞; "Great Ngu"); "Ngu" (虞) was derived from the Emperor Shun's lineage name, Youyu (有虞). Rulers of the Tây Sơn dynasty, initially surnamed Hồ, were descended from the same line as the Hồ dynasty.

=== Familial relations among dynasties ===
Several Vietnamese dynasties were related:

- Dương Vân Nga was originally an empress consort of Đinh Tiên Hoàng, the founder of the Đinh dynasty; she later became an empress consort of Lê Hoàn, the founder of the Early Lê dynasty
- Lê Thị Phất Ngân, the empress consort of Lý Thái Tổ, the founder of the Lý dynasty, was the daughter of Lê Hoàn and thus originally a princess of the Early Lê dynasty
- The final monarch of the Lý dynasty, Lý Chiêu Hoàng, was the spouse of Trần Thái Tông, the founder of the Trần dynasty. Later on, he would marry her elder sister, Princess Lý Oánh, the biological mother of Trần Thánh Tông.
- Hồ Quý Ly, the founder of the Hồ dynasty, was the maternal grandfather of Trần An, the last emperor of the Trần dynasty
- Giản Định Đế, the founder of the Later Trần dynasty, was a son of the ninth Trần monarch, Trần Nghệ Tông; he was also an older brother of the 12th emperor of the Trần dynasty, Trần Thuận Tông
- The Primitive Lê dynasty and the Revival Lê dynasty are collectively called the Later Lê dynasty; the founder of the Revival Lê dynasty, Lê Trang Tông, was a son of Lê Chiêu Tông, the 11th Primitive Lê emperor
- The ruling house of the Tây Sơn dynasty was descended from the same paternal ancestor as the Hồ dynasty
- Gia Long Đế, the founder of the Nguyễn dynasty, was a paternal grandson of Nguyễn Phúc Khoát, the eighth Nguyễn lord

=== Champa ===
Champa (Chăm Pa; 占婆) existed as an independent polity until its annexation by the Nguyễn dynasty in 1832 CE, thereby laying the foundation for the territories of the modern Vietnamese state. Most of the rulers of Champa were of Cham descent, an Austronesian ethnic group distinct from the majority Kinh ethnicity of Vietnam.

There were 15 dynasties in the history of Champa. According to Chinese historical sources, Champa officially used the quốc hiệu "Lâm Ấp" (林邑) from the 1st to 4th dynasties, "Hoàn Vương" (環王) during the 5th dynasty, and "Chiêm Thành" (占城) from the 6th to 15th dynasties.

== List of dynasties in Vietnamese history ==
This list includes the various dynasties in the history of Vietnam, of both local and Chinese origins. Dynasties of China that ruled Vietnam are highlighted in orange. The Triệu dynasty is highlighted in light orange due to its disputed status.

Dynasty		Period of rule			Status (Note: The status of a dynasty was dependent upon the supreme title bore by its monarch at any given time. For instance, since all monarchs of the Ngô dynasty held the title of king during their reign, the Ngô dynasty was of royal status.)	Rulers			
Historiographical name (English / Chữ Quốc ngữ / Hán Nôm)	Official name (Note: The official dynastic name, or quốc hiệu (derived from the Chinese equivalent guóhào), functioned as the formal name of the state during the respective period.) (Chữ Quốc ngữ / Hán Nôm)	From	To	Term	Status	Surname	First to rule (Note: In the case of Vietnamese dynasties, the monarchs listed were the de facto founders of dynasties. However, it was common for Vietnamese monarchs to posthumously honor earlier members of the family as monarchs. For instance, while the Trần dynasty was officially established by Trần Thái Tông, four earlier members of the ruling house were posthumously accorded imperial titles, the most senior of which was Trần Kinh who was conferred the temple name Mục Tổ (穆祖) and the posthumous name Ý Hoàng Đế (懿皇帝).) (Note: In the case of Chinese dynasties that ruled over Vietnam, the first and last monarch to rule Vietnam could be different from the founder and the final monarch of the particular dynasty. For instance, while the first and last monarch of the Ming dynasty to rule over Vietnam was the Yongle Emperor and Xuande Emperor respectively, the actual founder of the Ming dynasty was the Hongwu Emperor and the actual final Ming monarch was the Chongzhen Emperor.)	Last to rule	List
Hồng Bàng dynasty Hồng Bàng thị 鴻龐氏	2879–2524 BCE: Xích Quỷ 赤鬼 2524–258 BCE: Văn Lang 文郎	2879 BCE	258 BCE	2621 years	Royal		Kinh Dương Vương	Hùng Duệ Vương	(list)
Thục dynasty Thục triều / Nhà Thục 蜀朝 / 茹蜀	Âu Lạc 甌雒	257 BCE	207 BCE (Note: Alternative sources identify the rule of the Thục dynasty as having ended in 179 BCE, for a length of 78 years.)	50 years	Royal	Khai Minh 開明	An Dương Vương		(list)
Triệu dynasty (Note: The Triệu dynasty was founded by Zhao Tuo, an ethnic Chinese from the Qin dynasty. The dynasty was considered a local regime by traditional Vietnamese historiography, while modern historians usually view the regime as foreign. In Chinese historiography, the dynasty is typically regarded as a regional regime in southern China.); Triệu triều / Nhà Triệu 趙朝 / 茹趙	Nam Việt 南越	204 BCE	111 BCE	93 years	204–180 BCE; 125–111 BCE: Royal 180–125 BCE: Imperial (Note: While the Emperor Wu of Nanyue and the Emperor Wen of Nanyue claimed imperial title domestically, they adopted royal title when dealing with the Western Han.)	Zhao 趙	Wu of Nanyue	Zhao Jiande	(list)
Western Han (Note: The Western Han (Tây Hán; 西漢) and the Eastern Han (Đông Hán; 東漢) are collectively known as the Han dynasty (Hán triều / Nhà Hán; 漢朝 / 茹漢).) (Note: China's rule over Vietnam under the Western Han, the Xin dynasty, and the Eastern Han (until 40 CE) constitute the First Chinese domination of Vietnam in Vietnamese historiography.); Tây Hán 西漢	No independent Vietnamese dynastic title (Note: During periods of direct Chinese rule, Vietnam naturally did not possess an independent quốc hiệu of its own. Instead, the formal name of the realm would be the respective guóhào adopted by the Chinese dynasty that governed Vietnam at that time.)	111 BCE	9 CE	120 years	Imperial	Liu 劉	Wu of Han	Liu Ying (Note: Liu Ying was not officially enthroned and maintained the title huáng tàizǐ (皇太子; "crown prince") during the regency of Wang Mang. The last officially enthroned Western Han monarch who ruled over Vietnam was the Emperor Ping of Han.)	(list)
Xin dynasty Tân triều / Nhà Tân 新朝 / 茹新	No independent Vietnamese dynastic title	9 CE	23 CE	14 years	Imperial	Wang 王	Wang Mang		(list)
Eastern Han (Note: China's rule over Vietnam under the Eastern Han (since 43 CE), the Eastern Wu, the Western Jin, the Eastern Jin, the Liu Song, the Southern Qi, and the Liang dynasty constitute the Second Chinese domination of Vietnam in Vietnamese historiography.); Đông Hán 東漢	No independent Vietnamese dynastic title	25 CE	220 CE	192 years (Note: The rule of the Eastern Han over Vietnam was interrupted by the rule of the Trưng Sisters between 40 CE and 43 CE.)	Imperial	Liu 劉	Guangwu of Han	Xian of Han	(list)
Eastern Wu; Đông Ngô 東吳	No independent Vietnamese dynastic title	229 CE	280 CE	45 years (Note: The rule of the Eastern Wu over Vietnam was interrupted by the rule of the Western Jin between 266 CE and 271 CE.)	Imperial	Sun 孫	Da of Eastern Wu	Sun Hao	(list)
Western Jin (Note: The Western Jin (Tây Tấn; 西晉) and the Eastern Jin (Đông Tấn; 東晉) are collectively known as the Jin dynasty (Tấn triều / Nhà Tấn; 晉朝 / 茹晉).); Tây Tấn 西晉	No independent Vietnamese dynastic title	266 CE	316 CE	41 years (Note: The rule of the Western Jin over Vietnam was interrupted by the rule of the Eastern Wu between 271 CE and 280 CE.)	Imperial	Sima 司馬	Wu of Jin	Min of Jin	(list)
Eastern Jin; Đông Tấn 東晉	No independent Vietnamese dynastic title	317 CE	420 CE	103 years	Imperial	Sima 司馬	Yuan of Jin	Gong of Jin	(list)
Liu Song; Lưu Tống 劉宋	No independent Vietnamese dynastic title	420 CE	479 CE	59 years	Imperial	Liu 劉	Wu of Liu Song	Shun of Liu Song	(list)
Southern Qi; Nam Tề 南齊	No independent Vietnamese dynastic title	479 CE	502 CE	23 years	Imperial	Xiao 蕭	Gao of Southern Qi	He of Southern Qi	(list)
Liang dynasty Lương triều / Nhà Lương 梁朝 / 茹梁	No independent Vietnamese dynastic title	502 CE	544 CE	42 years	Imperial	Xiao 蕭	Wu of Liang		(list)
Early Lý dynasty Tiền Lý triều / Nhà Tiền Lý 前李朝 / 茹前李	Vạn Xuân (Note: Dã Năng (野能) was the quốc hiệu adopted by the realm of Đào Lang Vương.) 萬春	544 CE	602 CE	58 years	Imperial	Lý (Note: As Triệu Quang Phục, surnamed Triệu (趙), was not a member of the Lý (李) clan by birth, his enthronement was not a typical dynastic succession.) 李	Lý Bôn	Lý Phật Tử	(list)
Sui dynasty (Note: China's rule over Vietnam under the Sui dynasty, the Tang dynasty, the Wu Zhou, and the Southern Han constitute the Third Chinese domination of Vietnam in Vietnamese historiography.); Tùy triều / Nhà Tùy 隋朝 / 茹隋	No independent Vietnamese dynastic title	602 CE	618 CE	16 years	Imperial	Yang 楊	Wen of Sui	Yang of Sui	(list)
Tang dynasty Đường triều / Nhà Đường 唐朝 / 茹唐	No independent Vietnamese dynastic title	621 CE	907 CE	271 years (Note: The rule of the Tang dynasty over Vietnam was interrupted by the rule of the Wu Zhou between 690 CE and 705 CE.)	Imperial	Li 李	Gaozu of Tang	Ai of Tang	(list)
Wu Zhou; Võ Chu 武周	No independent Vietnamese dynastic title	690 CE	705 CE	15 years	Imperial	Wu 武	Shengshen of Wu Zhou		(list)
Southern Han; Nam Hán 南漢	No independent Vietnamese dynastic title	930 CE	938 CE	8 years	Imperial	Liu 劉	Gaozu of Southern Han		(list)
Ngô dynasty Ngô triều / Nhà Ngô 吳朝 / 茹吳	Tĩnh Hải quân 靜海軍	939 CE	965 CE	26 years	Royal	Ngô (Note: As Dương Tam Kha, surnamed Dương (楊), was not a member of the Ngô (吳) clan by birth, his enthronement was not a typical dynastic succession.) 吳	Ngô Quyền	Nam Tấn Vương (co-ruler) Thiên Sách Vương (co-ruler)	(list)
Đinh dynasty Đinh triều / Nhà Đinh 丁朝 / 茹丁	Đại Cồ Việt 大瞿越	968 CE	980 CE	12 years	Imperial (Note: While Vietnamese rulers used the imperial title of hoàng đế (皇帝; "emperor") domestically, they adopted the royal title of vương (王; "king") or quốc vương (國王; "king of state") when dealing with China—a policy historians have termed "emperor at home, king abroad".)	Đinh 丁	Đinh Bộ Lĩnh	Đinh Toàn	(list)
Early Lê dynasty Tiền Lê triều / Nhà Tiền Lê 前黎朝 / 茹前黎	Đại Cồ Việt 大瞿越	980 CE	1009 CE	29 years	Imperial	Lê 黎	Lê Hoàn	Lê Long Đĩnh	(list)
Lý dynasty Lý triều / Nhà Lý 李朝 / 茹李	1009–1054 CE: Đại Cồ Việt 大瞿越 1054–1225 CE: Đại Việt 大越	1009 CE	1225 CE	216 years	Imperial	Lý 李	Lý Thái Tổ	Lý Chiêu Hoàng	(list)
Trần dynasty Trần triều / Nhà Trần 陳朝 / 茹陳	Đại Việt 大越	1225 CE	1400 CE	175 years	Imperial	Trần (Note: Dương Nhật Lễ, surnamed Dương (楊), was an adopted member of the Trần (陳) clan. His enthronement was therefore not a typical dynastic succession.) 陳	Trần Thái Tông	Trần An	(list)
Hồ dynasty Hồ triều / Nhà Hồ 胡朝 / 茹胡	Đại Ngu 大虞	1400 CE	1407 CE	7 years	Imperial	Hồ (Note: The ruling house of the Hồ dynasty initially bore the surname Hồ (胡). Hồ Liêm later adopted Lê (黎) as the surname. Hồ Quý Ly subsequently restored the surname Hồ after the establishment of the Hồ dynasty.) 胡	Hồ Quý Ly	Hồ Hán Thương	(list)
Ming dynasty (Note: China's rule over Vietnam under the Ming dynasty constitutes the Fourth Chinese domination of Vietnam in Vietnamese historiography.); Minh triều / Nhà Minh 明朝 / 茹明	No independent Vietnamese dynastic title	1407 CE	1427 CE	20 years	Imperial	Zhu 朱	Yongle	Xuande	(list)
Later Trần dynasty Hậu Trần triều / Nhà Hậu Trần 後陳朝 / 茹後陳	Đại Việt 大越	1407 CE	1413 CE	6 years	Imperial	Trần 陳	Giản Định Đế	Trùng Quang Đế	(list)
Primitive Lê dynasty (Note: The Primitive Lê dynasty (Lê sơ triều / Nhà Lê sơ; 黎初朝 / 茹黎初) and the Revival Lê dynasty (Lê trung hưng triều / Nhà Lê trung hưng; 黎中興朝 / 茹黎中興) are collectively known as the Later Lê dynasty (Hậu Lê triều / Nhà Hậu Lê; 後黎朝 / 茹後黎).); Lê sơ triều / Nhà Lê sơ 黎初朝 / 茹黎初	Đại Việt 大越	1428 CE	1527 CE	99 years	Imperial	Lê 黎	Lê Thái Tổ	Lê Cung Hoàng	(list)
Mạc dynasty (Note: The period from 1533 CE to 1592 CE is known in historiography as the Northern and Southern dynasties (Nam-Bắc triều; 南北朝). The period began with the establishment of the Revival Lê dynasty and ended with the defeat of the Mạc dynasty, resulting in the Mạc retreat to Cao Bằng where it continued to rule until 1677 CE.); Mạc triều / Nhà Mạc 莫朝 / 茹莫	Đại Việt 大越	1527 CE	1677 CE	150 years	Imperial	Mạc 莫	Mạc Thái Tổ	Mạc Kính Vũ	(list)
Revival Lê dynasty Lê trung hưng triều / Nhà Lê trung hưng 黎中興朝 / 茹黎中興	Đại Việt 大越	1533 CE	1789 CE	256 years	Imperial	Lê 黎	Lê Trang Tông	Lê Mẫn Đế	(list)
Tây Sơn dynasty Tây Sơn triều / Nhà Tây Sơn 西山朝 / 茹西山	Đại Việt 大越	1778 CE	1802 CE	24 years	Imperial	Nguyễn (Note: The ruling house of the Tây Sơn dynasty initially bore the surname Hồ (胡). Nguyễn (阮) was subsequently adopted as the surname by Thái Đức Đế prior to the establishment of the Tây Sơn dynasty.) 阮	Thái Đức Đế	Cảnh Thịnh Đế	(list)
Nguyễn dynasty (Note: From 1883 CE to 1945 CE, Nguyễn monarchs nominally ruled over the French protectorates of Annam and Tonkin. In 1945 CE, the last Nguyễn monarch, Bảo Đại Đế, served as the nominal ruler of the Japanese-dominated Empire of Vietnam.); Nguyễn triều / Nhà Nguyễn 阮朝 / 茹阮	1802–1804 CE: Nam Việt 南越 1804–1839 CE: Việt Nam (Note: While Việt Nam (越南) was the quốc hiệu bestowed on the Nguyễn dynasty by the Jiaqing Emperor of the Qing dynasty, the Nguyễn dynasty used the name Đại Việt Nam (大越南) when it conducted foreign relations with states other than China.) 越南 1839–1945 CE: Đại Nam 大南 1945 CE: Đế quốc Việt Nam 帝國越南	1802 CE	1945 CE	143 years	Imperial	Nguyễn Phúc (Note: The ruling house of the Nguyễn dynasty initially bore the surname Nguyễn (阮). Nguyễn Phúc (阮福) was subsequently adopted as the surname by Nguyễn Thái Tổ prior to the establishment of the Nguyễn dynasty.) 阮福	Gia Long Đế	Bảo Đại Đế	(list)

== Timeline of dynasties in Vietnamese history ==
Legend:

- Orange denotes local Vietnamese dynasties
- Teal denotes dynasties during the First Era of Northern Domination
- Olive denotes dynasties during the Second Era of Northern Domination
- Green denotes dynasties during the Third Era of Northern Domination
- Pink denotes dynasty during the Fourth Era of Northern Domination

== See also ==
- Dynasty
- East Asian cultural sphere
- Emperor at home, king abroad
- Family tree of Vietnamese monarchs
- History of Vietnam
- Hua–Yi distinction
- List of historical capitals of Vietnam
- List of monarchs of Vietnam
- Little China (ideology)
- Names of Vietnam
- Northern and Southern dynasties (Vietnam)
- Sinicization
- Timeline of Vietnamese history
- Timeline of Vietnam under Chinese rule
- Vietnam under Chinese rule
