= Dowager Empress Gia Từ =

- Born: ? Đại Lại village, Vĩnh Ninh district, Ái Châu, Thanh Đô town, Annam
- Died: ? Thăng Long, Annam
- Spouse: Trần Duệ Tông
- Issue: Trần Phế Đế

Dowager Empress Gia Từ of Lê clan (Chữ Hán: 嘉慈皇太后 黎氏, ? - 1381) was the consort of Trần dynasty.

== Biography ==
Lady Gia Từ was born at Đại Lại village, Vĩnh Lộc district, Ái Châu, Thanh Hoa town (now Hà Đông commune, Hà Trung local government, Thanh Hóa province. By Complete annals of Đại Việt, she was younger cousin of official Lê Quý Ly. April 1371, prince Trần Kính was preferred as the crown prince, emperor Trần Nghệ Tông recognized her as crown prince's consort (皇太子妃) at once.

In 1372, Trần Nghệ Tông has abdicated in favour of his crown prince, so Kính became new emperor. At one Trần Duệ Tông preferred his first wife hereditary title Consort Hiển Trinh (顯貞宸妃). So in 1373, she became Empress Hiển Trinh (顯貞皇后).

In 1377, Trần Duệ Tông was killed at the Battle of Vijjaya. Empress Hiển Trinh was very heart-broken and she became buddhist nun. After the death of emperor, retired emperor Nghệ Tông in May 1377 passed the throne to Duệ Tông's eldest prince Trần Hiện. So empress Hiển Trinh became Dowager Empress Gia Từ (嘉慈皇太后). By Dream memoir of Southern Man, she opposed the accession of her son because she felt its dangers.

October 1381, Dowager Empress Gia Từ died at the Western room of Chiêu Khánh pagoda. In her vaticination, 6 December 1388 Trần Hiện was dethroned and then he was killed at the end of that month.

== See also ==
- Trần Duệ Tông
- Trần Phế Đế
