= List of emperors of the Trần dynasty =

The Trần dynasty (1225–1440), found by Trần clan, was an imperial dynasty of Đại Việt that succeeded the Lý dynasty (1009–1225) and preceded the Hồ dynasty (1400–07). The first emperor of the dynasty was Trần Thái Tông (1218–77) and Trần Dynasty ended with the usurpation of throne from Trần Thiếu Đế (1396–?) by Hồ Quý Ly, the emperor's maternal grandfather.

Below is a complete list of emperors of the Trần dynasty, including their temple names, given names, and era names, each name is presented in Vietnamese alphabet and attached with its chữ Hán (Chinese characters), posthumous names, which were usually very long and rarely used when referring to the sovereign, are presented in last column. Besides emperors, Đại Việt under Trần dynasty was often co-ruled by who already ceded his throne in name but still reigned until his decease or complete retirement.

== Emperors ==
=== Trần dynasty ===
Temple names (Miếu hiệu)	Birth names (Tên húy)	Birth-Death	Period of reigns	Era names (Niên hiệu)	Posthumous names (Thụy hiệu)	Ref.
Thái Tổ (太祖)	Trần Thừa (陳承)	1184–1234	1226–1234		Khai Vận Lập Cực Hoằng Nhân Ứng Đạo Thuần Chân Chí Đức Thần Vũ Thánh Văn Thùy Dụ Chí Hiếu Hoàng Đế (開運立極弘仁應道純真至德神武聖文垂裕至孝皇帝)	
Thái Tông (太宗)	Trần Cảnh (陳煚)	1218–1277	1226–1258	Kiến Trung (建中, 1226–1232); Thiên Ứng Chính Bình (天應政平, 1232–1251); Nguyên Phong (元豐, 1251–1258)	Thống thiên ngự cực long công mậu đức hiển hòa hựu thuận thần văn thánh vũ nguyên hiếu hoàng đế (統天御極隆功茂德顯和佑順神文聖武元孝皇帝)	
Thánh Tông (聖宗)	Trần Hoảng (陳晃)	1240–1290	1258–1278	Thiệu Long (紹隆, 1258–1272); Bảo Phù (寶符, 1273–1278)	Huyền công thịnh đức nhân minh văn vũ tuyên hiếu hoàng đế (玄功盛德仁明文武宣孝皇帝)	
Nhân Tông (仁宗)	Trần Khâm (陳昑)	1258–1308	1278–1293	Thiệu Bảo (紹寶, 1278–1285); Trùng Hưng (重興, 1285–1293)	Pháp thiên sùng đạo ứng thế hoa dân long từ hiển huệ thánh văn thần vũ nguyên minh duệ hiếu hoàng đế (法天崇道應世化民隆慈顯惠聖文神武元明睿孝皇帝)	
Anh Tông (英宗)	Trần Thuyên (陳烇)	1276–1320	1293–1314	Hưng Long (興隆, 1293–1314)	Hiển văn duệ vũ khâm minh nhân hiếu hoàng đế (顯文睿武欽明仁孝皇帝)	
Minh Tông (明宗)	Trần Mạnh (陳奣)	1300–1357	1314–1329	Đại Khánh (大慶, 1314–1323); Khai Thái (開泰, 1324–1329)	Chương nghiêu văn triết hoàng đế (章堯文哲皇帝)	
Hiến Tông (憲宗)	Trần Vượng (陳旺)	1319–1341	1329–1341	Khai Hựu (開佑, 1329–1341)		
Dụ Tông (裕宗)	Trần Hạo (陳暭)	1336–1369	1341–1369	Thiệu Phong (紹豐, 1341–1357); Đại Trị (大治, 1358–1369)		
	Dương Nhật Lễ^{[A]} (楊日禮)	?–1370	1369–1370	Đại Định (大定, 1369–1370)		
Nghệ Tông (藝宗)	Trần Phủ (陳暊)	1321–1394	1370–1372	Thiệu Khánh (紹慶, 1370–1372)	Quang nghiêu anh triết hoàng đế (光堯英哲皇帝)	
Duệ Tông (睿宗)	Trần Kính (陳曔)	1337–1377	1373–1377	Long Khánh (隆慶, 1373–1377)		
	Trần Hiện^{[B]} (陳晛)	1361–1388	1377–1388	Xương Phù (昌符, 1377–1388)		
Thuận Tông^{[C]} (順宗)	Trần Ngung (陳顒)	1378–1399	1388–1398	Quang Thái (光泰, 1388–1398)		
	Trần An^{[D]}^{[E]} (陳𤇼)	1396–?	1398–1400	Kiến Tân (建新, 1398–1400)		

A : Before his death, Dụ Tông pass the throne to Dương Nhật Lễ ignoring the fact that Dương was not from the Trần clan. Dương Nhật Lễ was soon dethroned, demoted to the title of Hôn Đức Công (昏德公), and killed by members of the royal family.
B : Phế Đế was dethroned to Linh Đức đại vương (King of Linh Duc) by Retired Emperor (Thái thượng hoàng) Nghệ Tông after Hồ Quý Ly's advice.
C : Thuận Tông was obliged to pass the throne to Thiếu Đế by Hồ Quý Ly. Afterward he was forced to commit suicide after order of Hồ Quý Ly.
D : Thiếu Đế was overthrown by Hồ Quý Ly and was downgraded to Bảo Ninh đại vương (King of Bao Ninh).
E : His given name (An, 𤇼) was suggested by authors of Khâm định Việt sử Thông giám cương mục, the official historical book of Nguyễn dynasty, because they could not find the exact Chinese character for this sovereign.

=== Later Trần dynasty ===
Temple names (Miếu hiệu)	Birth names (Tên húy)	Birth-Death	Period of reigns	Era names (Niên hiệu)	Posthumous names (Thụy hiệu)	Ref.
	Trần Ngỗi (陳頠)	? – 1410	2/10/1407 – 1409	Hưng Khánh (興慶, 1407–1409)		
	Trần Quý Khoáng (陳季擴)	? – 1414	17/3/1409 – 1414	Trùng Quang (重光, 1409–1414)		
	Trần Cảo (陳暠)	? – 1428	1426–1428	Thiên Khánh (天慶, 1426–1428)		

== Retired emperor ==
Retired emperor	Period of reigns	Notes	Ref.
Trần Thái Tổ	1226–1234	Retired emperor only in name^{[A]}	
Trần Thái Tông	1259–1277	During the reign of Trần Thánh Tông	
Trần Thánh Tông	1278–1290	During the reign of Trần Nhân Tông	
Trần Nhân Tông	1294–1308	During the reign of Trần Anh Tông	
Trần Anh Tông	1314–1320	During the reign of Trần Minh Tông	
Trần Minh Tông	1329–1357	During the reign of Trần Hiến Tông and Trần Dụ Tông	
Trần Nghệ Tông	1372–1394	During the reign of Trần Duệ Tông, Trần Phế Đế and Trần Thuận Tông	
Trần Thuận Tông^{[B]}	1398–1399	During the reign of Trần Thiếu Đế	

A : Being father of Trần Thái Tông, the first emperor of Trần Dynasty, Trần Thái Tổ was honoured with the title of Retired Emperor.
B : Thuận Tông was obliged to pass the throne to Thiếu Đế and become retired emperor by Hồ Quý Ly.

== Chronicle ==
Thái Tổ
Thái Tông
Thánh Tông
Nhân Tông
Anh Tông
Minh Tông
Nghệ Tông	Hiến Tông	Dụ Tông	Duệ Tông	Cung Túc
Thuận Tông	Phế Đế	Nhật Lễ
Thiếu Đế

== See also ==
- List of monarchs of Vietnam
