= Empress Lê =

Empress Lê may refer to:

- Lê Thị Phất Ngân (died after 1028), wife of Lý Thái Tổ
- Empress Linh Chiếu (1108–1161), wife of Lý Thần Tông
- Dowager Empress Gia Từ (died 1381), wife of Trần Duệ Tông
- Lê Ngọc Hân (1770–1799), wife of Quang Trung
- Lê Ngọc Bình (1785–1810), wife of Nguyễn Quang Toản
