= Trần Triệt =

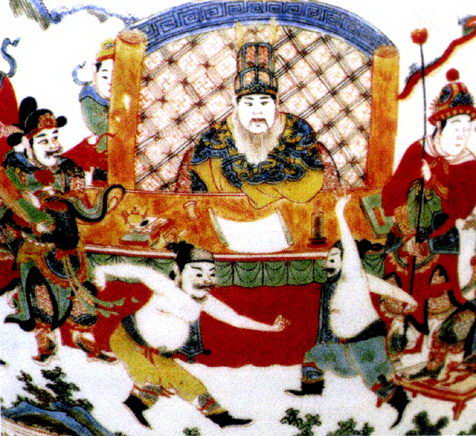
- Portrait.
- Born: 1232; Triệt village, Tây Chân district, Thiên Trường local government, Vietnam
- Died: ? Triệt village, Tây Chân district, Thiên Trường local government, Vietnam
- Spouse: Lữ Thị
- Children: Trần Quốc Toản

Trần Triệt (Ancient Vietnamese : 陳婆列 / Trần B'liệt, Modern Vietnamese : 陳徹 / Trần Triệt; 1232 – ?), hereditary title Hoài Đức vương (懷德王), was the prince of Trần dynasty.

== Biography ==
Trần Triệt was born in 1232 at Triệt village, Tây Chân district, Thiên Trường local government (now Nam Chân rural commune, Nam Trực district, Nam Định province). He is illegitimate child of retired emperor Trần Thái Tổ and wench Tần.

When Triệt grew up, he became a wrestler. By a wrestle, the retired emperor has seen his cloth on Triệt's head which Trần Thái Tổ gifted lady Tần ago. Suddenly he embraced Triệt and cried. Then the retired emperor recognized Triệt as his prince.

However, Triệt refused living in the capital Thăng Long to return his countryside. He wanted to serve his old mother. So retired emperor Trần Thái Tổ consecrated him in formal title Hoài Đức vương and distributed him many cultivated lands like another princes.

Nếu như không có sự bội tình hôm ấy, thì có lẽ Trần Triệt ngay từ đầu sẽ là 1 hoàng tử chứ chẳng phải là dân thường.

== See also ==
- Trần Thái Tổ
- Trần Quốc Toản
