= Tây Đô =

- Commune
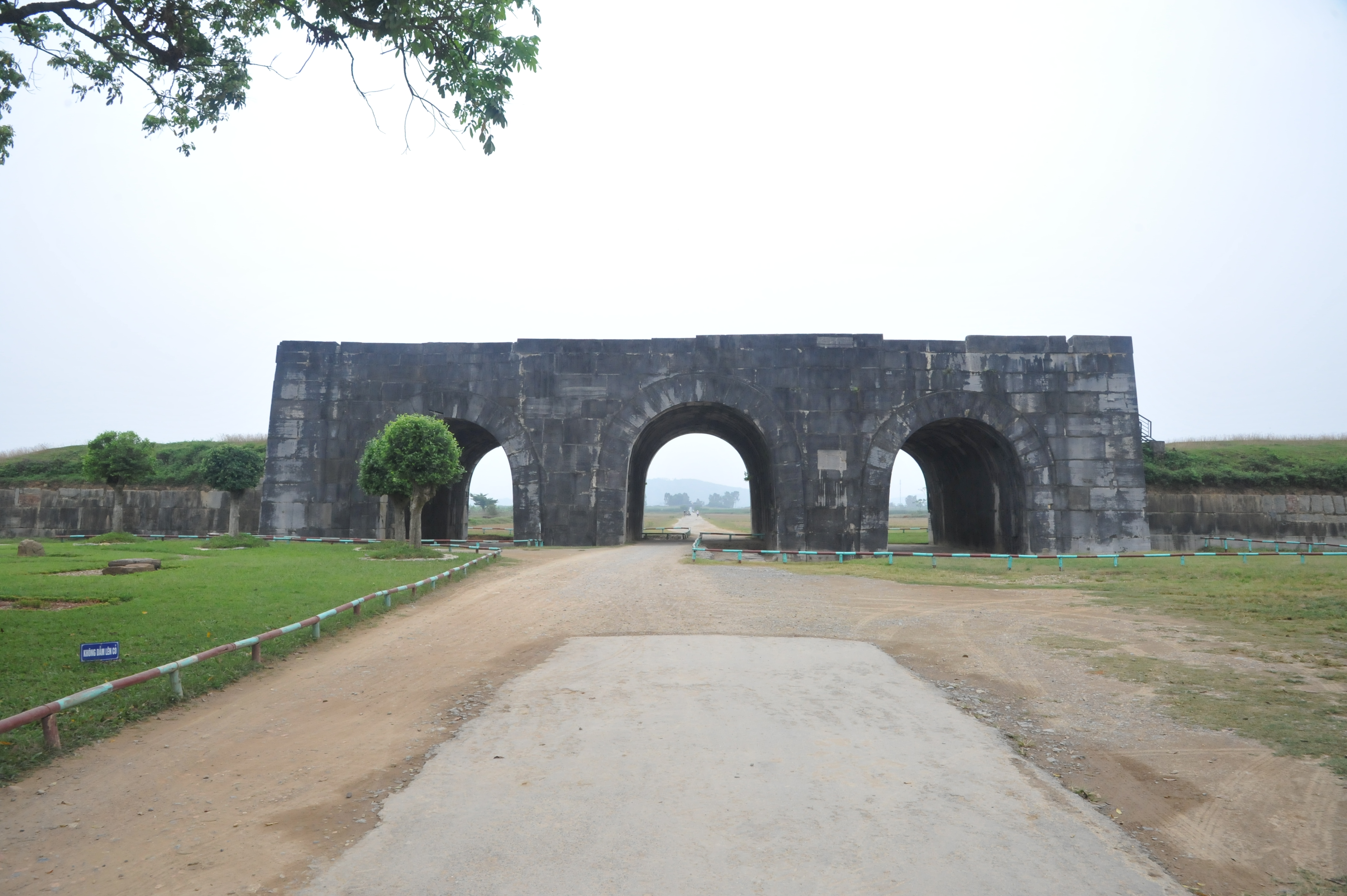
- Southern gate of Hồ Dynasty Citadel
- Interactive map of Tây Đô
- Coordinates: 20°05′51″N 105°36′46″E
- Country: Vietnam
- Region: North Central Coast
- Province: Thanh Hóa
- Established: 16 June 2025
- Administrative headquarters: Đông Môn Hamlet

Area
  - Total: 35.36 km^{2} (13.65 sq mi)

Population (2024)
  - Total: 27,440
  - Density: 775/km^{2} (2,010/sq mi)
- Postal code: 41122
- Website: taydo.thanhhoa.gov.vn

Tây Đô is a commune in Thanh Hóa province, Vietnam.

On 16 June 2025, Vĩnh Lộc district was dissolved as part of the 2025 Vietnamese administrative reform, which abolished the district-level administrative system. Tây Đô Commune was established under Resolution No. 1686/NQ-UBTVQH15 of the Standing Committee of the National Assembly of Vietnam, through the merger of the entire area and population of four communes: Vĩnh Quang, Vĩnh Yên, Vĩnh Tiến, and Vĩnh Long.
