= Trần Thiếu Đế =

Trần Thiếu Đế 陳少帝
- Emperor of Đại Việt

Emperor of the Trần dynasty
- Reign: 1398–1400
- Predecessor: Trần Thuận Tông
- Successor: Dynasty collapsed Hồ Quý Ly of Hồ dynasty
- Born: 1396; Thăng Long, Đại Việt
- Died: Unknown; Unknown
- Burial: Thăng Long, Đại Việt
Names
- Trần Yên (陳𭴣)
Era dates
- Kiến Tân (建新)
Posthumous name
- King Bảo Ninh (保寧大王)
- House: Trần dynasty
- Father: Trần Thuận Tông
- Mother: Queen Thánh Ngâu
- Religion: Buddhism

Trần Thiếu Đế (chữ Hán: 陳少帝, 1396–?), was the twelfth and the last emperor of the Trần dynasty who reigned over Vietnam from 1398 to 1400.

== Biography ==
Trần Thiếu Đế's name (𤇼 / Yên) was suggested by Khâm định Việt sử thông giám cương mục, because Nguyễn dynasty's officials could not find the exact Chinese character for this sovereign (National Bureau for Historical Record 1998, p. 321). At the age of only three, he was chosen to succeed his father Trần Thuận Tông who was forced by regent Hồ Quý Ly to resign and hold the title Retired Emperor. Only two years after Thiếu Đế's coronation, Hồ Quý Ly overthrew the Emperor to establish his own dynasty, the Hồ dynasty.

=== Childhood ===
Thiếu Đế (Young Emperor) was born in 1396 as Trần Yên (陳𭴣), first child of the Emperor Trần Thuận Tông, and his wife, the Queen Thánh Ngâu who was daughter of Hồ Quý Ly. On March 15 of the Lunar calendar, 1398, under pressure of Hồ Quý Ly, Thuận Tông had to cede the throne to his three-year-old son, now Trần Thiếu Đế, and held the position of retired emperor.

According to Đại Việt sử ký toàn thư, actually Hồ Quý Ly wanted to overthrow Thuận Tông but before his death, the Retired Emperor Trần Nghệ Tông made Quý Ly promise him supporting the Emperor therefore Hồ Quý Ly decided to force Thuận Tông to abdicate before taking over the throne from the new emperor. After the coronation, Thiếu Đế changed the era name to Kiến Tân (建新, 1398–1400).

=== As emperor ===
Only one year after Trần Thiếu Đế's ascension as emperor, Hồ Quý Ly ordered general Phạm Khả Vĩnh to put the retired emperor Thuận Tông to death. Sometimes later, however, Phạm Khả Vĩnh allied with some imperial house members and high-ranking officials such as Trần Khát Chân, Trần Hãng and Lương Nguyên Bưu in a plot to murder Hồ Quý Ly. The plot failed and Hồ Quý Ly issued the execution of every plotter along with their families and even their slaves. That resulted in the death of over 370 persons. In June 1399, Hồ Quý Ly took another step when he self-entitled Quốc Tổ Chương Hoàng (King Chương Father of the Nation) and began to use ceremonials which were reserved exclusively for the Emperor. Profiting the chaotic situation in royal court, Nguyễn Nhữ Cái gathered thousands of people to rise a revolt against Trần's rulers in the northwestern region. This revolt was put down in December by the troops of general Nguyễn Bằng Cử.

Ultimately, the end of the Trần dynasty was tolled on February 28 of the Lunar calendar, 1400 when Hồ Quý Ly decided to overthrow Thiếu Đế and established a new dynasty, the Hồ dynasty. Being Hồ Quý Ly's own grandson, Thiếu Đế was only downgraded to Prince Bảo Ninh instead of being killed like his father. His fate during the Hồ dynasty and the subsequent invasion of the Ming dynasty is unknown.

Trần Thiếu Đế House of Trần Born: 1396
Regnal titles
| Preceded by Trần Thuận Tông | Emperor of Đại Việt; 1398–1400 | Succeeded by Hồ Quý Ly |
| Preceded by Trần Thuận Tông | Emperor of Trần dynasty 1398–1400 | Succeeded by none |
