= Trần Thừa =

Trần Thái Tổ 陳太祖
- Retired Emperor of Đại Việt

Retired Emperor of the Trần dynasty
- Reign: 1226–1234
- Predecessor: none
- Successor: Trần Thái Tông
- Born: 1184; Lưu Gia, Đại Việt
- Died: 1234 (aged 49–50); Thăng Long, Đại Việt
- Burial: Huy Tomb
- Spouse: Lê Thị
- Issue: Trần Liễu; Trần Cảnh; Trần Nhật Hiệu; Trần Triệt; Thụy Bà; Thiên Thành
Names
- Trần Thừa (陳承)
Posthumous name
- Khai Vận Lập Cực Hoằng Nhân Ứng Đạo Thuần Chân Chí Đức Thần Vũ Thánh Văn Thùy Dụ Chí Hiếu Hoàng Đế (開運立極弘仁應道純真至德神武聖文垂裕至孝皇帝)
Temple name
- Huy Tông (徽宗); Thái Tổ (太祖)
- House: Trần dynasty
- Father: Trần Lý
- Religion: Buddhism

Trần Thừa (chữ Hán: 陳承, 1184–1234) was the head of the Trần clan and a high-ranking mandarin during the reign of Lý Huệ Tông and Lý Chiêu Hoàng. After the overthrow of the Lý dynasty by Trần Thủ Độ, Trần Thừa's second son Trần Cảnh was enthroned as Trần Thái Tông, the first emperor of the Trần dynasty. Trần Thừa was the de-facto ruler of the dynasty, reigning as Thái Thượng Hoàng (Retired Emperor) from 1225 until his death. He was posthumously given the temple name Trần Thái Tổ (陳太祖) after his death. He was thus the first retired emperor of the Trần dynasty and the only one who had not held the throne.

== History ==
Trần Thừa was born in 1184 as the first son of Trần Lý who made his great fortune by fishing in Lưu Gia village (now Hưng Hà, Thái Bình). During the troubled time under the reign of Lý Cao Tông, the Crown Prince Lý Sảm sought refuge in Trần Lý's family and decided to marry his beautiful daughter Trần Thị Dung, younger sister of Trần Thừa, in 1209. Afterward, it was the Trần clan who helped Lý Cao Tông and Lý Sảm restored the throne in Thăng Long; therefore, the Emperor appointed several members of the Trần clan for high positions in the royal court such as Tô Trung Từ, who was the uncle of Trần Thị Dung, or Trần Tự Khánh, who was Trần Thừa's younger brother. In 1211 the Crown Prince Lý Sảm was enthroned as Lý Huệ Tông after the death of Lý Cao Tông, and by then Trần clan's position began to rise in the royal court. Trần Tự Khánh was renowned as a skilled general in battle, and he had a significant part in pacifying many revolts in the country, so the Emperor since entrusted him with the role of Regent and his brother Trần Thừa was also nominated for the position of court servant in December 1216. As a result, power in royal court gradually fell into the hands of the Trần clan. After the death of Trần Tự Khánh in 1223, Trần Thừa was appointed for the highest military position in the royal court while his cousin Trần Thủ Độ took charge of the royal guard.

In October 1224, Lý Huệ Tông decided to cede the throne to his daughter, the Princess Chiêu Thánh, now the Empress Regnant Lý Chiêu Hoàng. Chiêu Hoàng was only six at that time so every important decision in the royal court was made by the Trần clan. Profiting from this circumstance, Trần Thủ Độ arranged a marriage between Chiêu Hoàng and Trần Cảnh, the eight-year-old son of Trần Thừa. With Trần Cảnh being the Empress Regnant's husband, Trần Thủ Độ was finally able to overthrow the Lý dynasty by making Lý Chiêu Hoàng pass the throne to Trần Cảnh, now Trần Thái Tông, in 1225. After the coronation of his son, Trần Thừa acted as Regent of the Emperor but it was Trần Thủ Độ who decided both military and civil activities in royal court. In October 1226, Trần Thừa was honoured by the title Retired Emperor as Trần Thái Tổ, the first retired emperor of the Trần dynasty.

Unlike other retired emperors of the Trần dynasty, who usually co-ruled with the reigning emperor, Trần Thái Tổ only held the honorary title of Retired Emperor while grand chancellor Trần Thủ Độ took charge of restoring order in the royal court and put down the tough revolt of Nguyễn Nộn and Đoàn Thượng. Thái Tổ died on January 18 of the Lunar calendar, 1234 at the age of 51, and was buried in Thọ Lăng with the posthumous name Khai Vận Lập Cực Hoằng Nhân Ứng Đạo Thuần Chân Chí Đức Thần Vũ Thánh Văn Thùy Dụ Chí Hiếu Hoàng Đế.

== Family ==
Trần Thái Tổ had one wife whose family name was Lê but given name was unknown. He had four sons and two daughters:

- Prince An Sinh Trần Liễu who was father of Prince Hưng Đạo Trần Quốc Tuấn
- Trần Cảnh who became Trần Thái Tông, the first emperor of the Trần dynasty
- Prince Khâm Thiên Trần Nhật Hiệu
- Prince Hoài Đức Trần Triệt who was son of another wife of Trần Thái Tổ. He was initially forsaken by Thái Tổ and only received the title Prince Hoài Đức in 1232 by an order of Trần Thái Tông.
- Princess Thụy Bà
- Princess Thiên Thành

Trần Thừa House of Trần Born: 1184 Died: 1234
Regnal titles
Preceded by none	Retired Emperor of the Trần dynasty 1226–1334	Succeeded by Trần Thái Tông
