= Hồ dynasty =

Vietnamese dynasty (1400–1407)

Đại Ngu 大虞國 Đại Ngu Quốc
- 1400–1407
- Map of Vietnam under the House of Hồ in 1401 (dark pink)
- Capital: Tây Đô
- Official languages: Middle Vietnamese (written in Chữ Nôm)
- Religion: Buddhism (official), Taoism, Confucianism, Vietnamese folk religion
- Government: Absolute monarchy
- Emperor
  - 1400–1401: Hồ Quý Ly (first)
  - 1401–1406: Hồ Hán Thương (last)
- History
  - Established: 1400
  - Disestablished: 1407
- Currency: copper coins, paper money (tiền and mân)
Preceded by	Succeeded by
Trần dynasty	Fourth Era of Northern Domination; Later Trần dynasty

Hồ
- Country: Đại Ngu
- Founded: 15th century
- Founder: Hồ Quý Ly
- Final ruler: Hồ Hán Thương
- Titles: King/Grand Prince of Tĩnh Hải quân Titles given by the Chinese empires: King of Annam
- Estate: Tây Đô
- Deposition: 1407

The Hồ dynasty (Vietnamese: Nhà Hồ, chữ Nôm: 茹胡; Vietnamese: triều Hồ, chữ Hán: 朝胡, Chinese characters: 胡朝), officially Đại Ngu (Vietnamese: Đại Ngu; chữ Hán: 大虞), was a short-lived Vietnamese dynasty consisting of the reigns of two monarchs, Hồ Quý Ly and his second son, Hồ Hán Thương. The practice of bequeathing the throne to a designated son (not simply passing it on to the eldest) was similar to what had happened in the previous Trần dynasty and was meant to avoid sibling rivalry. Hồ Quý Ly's eldest son, Hồ Nguyên Trừng, played his part as the dynasty's military general. In 2011, UNESCO declared the Citadel of the Hồ Dynasty in Thanh Hóa Province a world heritage site. The Hồ dynasty was conquered by the Chinese Ming dynasty in 1407.

== Hồ Quý Ly (c. 1335 – c. 1407) ==
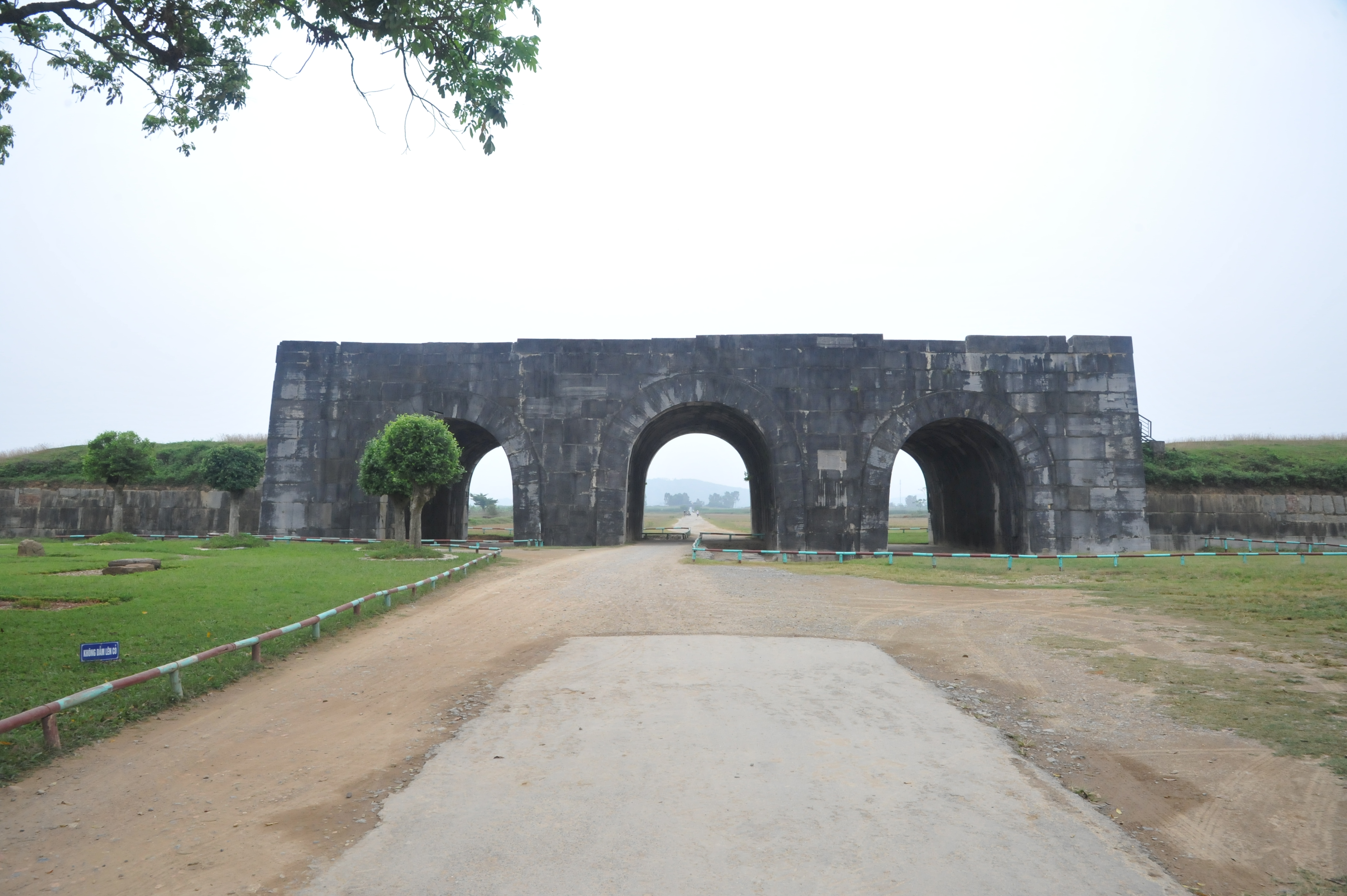
South gate of Tây Đô castle, capital of the Hồ dynasty.

=== Origin and background ===
The Hồ/Hú family originated around modern-day Zhejiang province in the Southern Tang dynasty, which controlled much of southeast China, around the 940s. China was then in the midst of the chaotic Five Dynasties and Ten Kingdoms period. The Hồ claimed descent from Duke Hu of Chen (Trần Hồ công, 陳胡公), who in turn was descended from the ancient Chinese Emperor Shun (Thuấn, 舜). Under Hồ Liêm (胡廉), Hồ Quý Ly's great-great-grandfather, the family migrated south from the Southern Tang until they established themselves in northern Vietnam. Hồ Liêm moved further south and settled in Thanh Hóa Province (about 100 km south of the modern city of Hanoi). Some historians bring attention to the fact that Hồ Quý Ly is also known as Lê Quý Ly. In his childhood, Hồ Quý Ly was adopted by Lê Huan, and took his family name. He did not change his family name from Lê back to Hồ until after he had deposed the last king of the Trần dynasty. Because of the short span of the Hồ dynasty and the tragic circumstances they brought upon the country, the family name "Hồ" was disgraced thereafter. However, historians have attributed to the Hồ family quite a few notable scholars, dignitaries, and government officials under both the Lý dynasty and the Trần dynasty.

=== Hồ Quý Ly's ascent to power ===
The Trần dynasty's authority and power in the 1370s and 1380s declined steadily after Trần Nghệ Tông's reign (1370–1372). He had ceded the throne in favor of his son Trần Duệ Tông (r. 1372–77), his grandson Trần Phế Đế (r. 1377–88), and Trần Thuận Tông (r. 1388–98), one of his younger sons.

The Trần dynasty became known for emperors who reigned for only a few years before relinquishing the throne to a favorite son and becoming Thái Thượng Hoàng Đế, the first dynasty to take the name of Father of "Hoàng Đế" emperor title. Hồ Quý Ly was a skillful and sly politician that arose during the Tran dynasty. He was widely known for his cunning, courage, and boldness and had distinguished himself in a successful campaign against the Chams of Champa. Through his scheming and shrewd marriage alliances (to a sister of Emperor Trần Duệ Tông and Trần Thuận Tông), Hồ Quý Ly made himself a court fixture in the position of the emperors' indispensable advisor. In less than 20 years, while many others involved in court intrigues were being assassinated all around him, Hồ Quý Ly attained the highest post of General/Protector/Regent of the country in 1399.

=== Coup d'état of Hồ Quý Ly (1399) ===
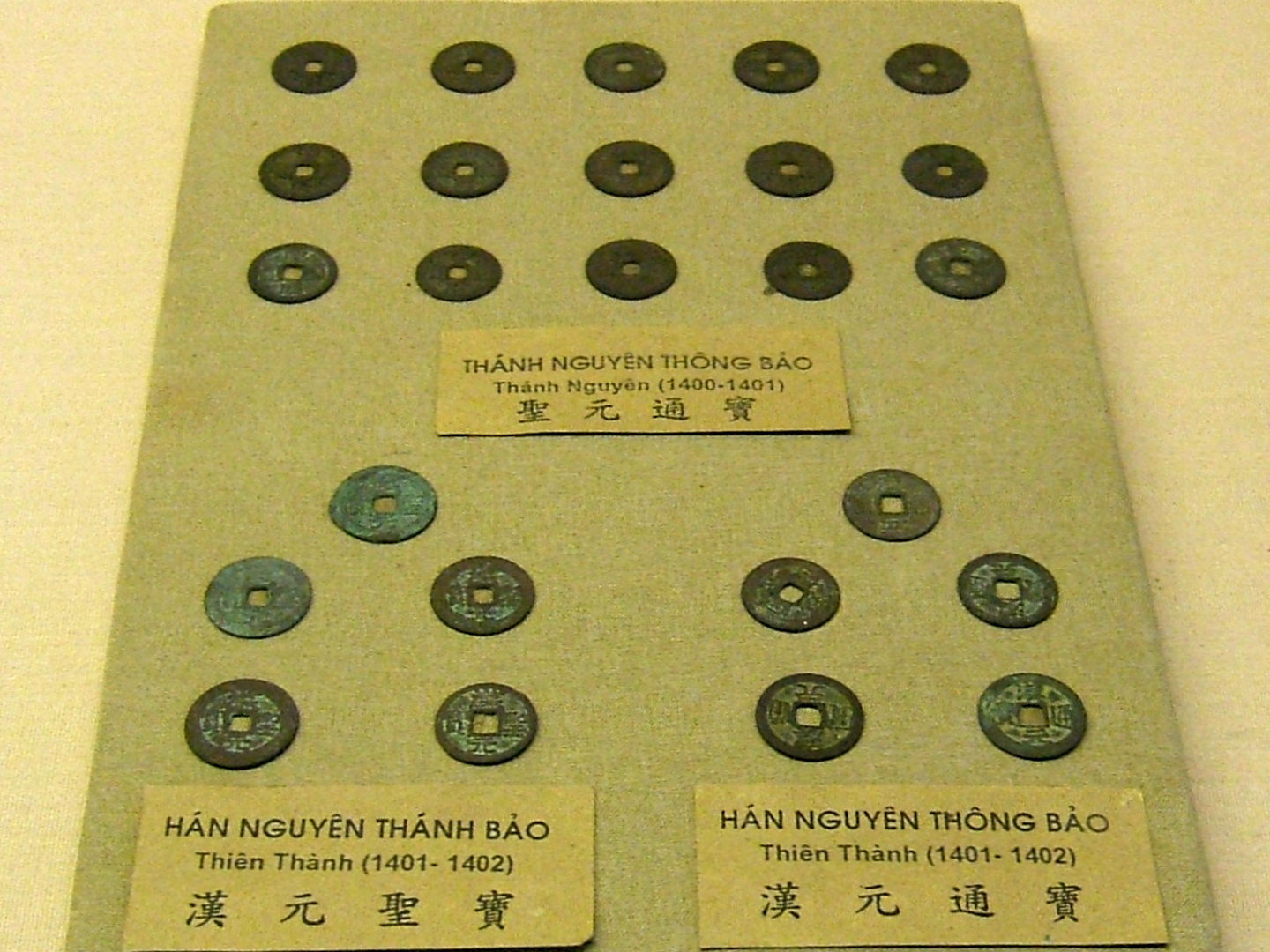
Coins issued by Hồ dynasty, Vietnam in the 15th century. They are made from bronze

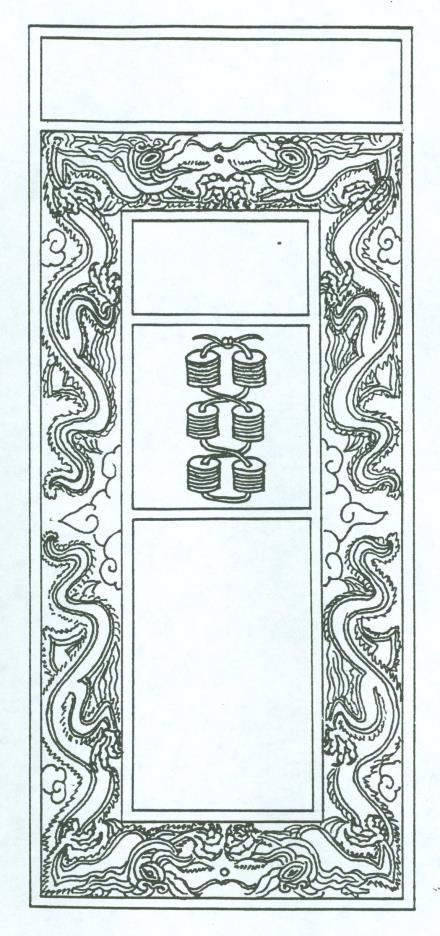
A print of banknote Hội Sao Thông Bảo issued by Hồ Quý Lý when he was the minister of the Trần dynasty's court, 1393.

To facilitate his takeover, Hồ Quý Ly first had a new capital built, called Tây Đô (literally "Western Capital"). In 1399, he invited the current emperor, Trần Thuận Tông, to visit this new capital. After coaxing the emperor into relinquishing the throne to Prince An (a three-year-old child) he had Trần Thuận Tông imprisoned in a pagoda and later executed. Prince An "reigned" for one year until Hồ Quý Ly deposed him in 1400 and declared himself to be the new emperor.

==== Đại Ngu ====
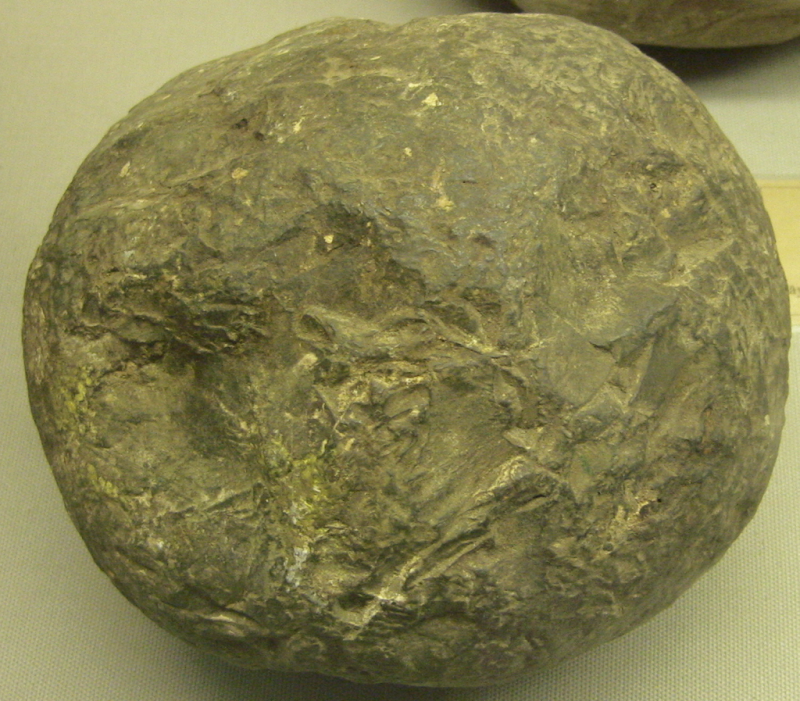
Cannonball found in Tây Đô citadel, size 57 mm, make by rock, dated XIV-XV century

After coronation, Hồ Quý Ly immediately changed the country's name from Đại Việt to Đại Ngu (大虞, meaning "Great Peace"), which might have been inspired by Hồ Quý Ly's claims that the Hồ family were descendants of Shun of Yu (虞舜, "Ngu" is Vietnamese pronunciation for 虞 "Yu") through Gui Man (媯滿), the Duke Hu of Chen ("Hồ" is the Vietnamese pronunciation for "胡 Hu").

Taking a page from the ruling book of his Trần predecessors, Hồ Quý Ly reigned less than a year before relinquishing the throne to his second son, Hồ Hán Thương. He then became known as the Emperor's Highest Father (太上皇, Sino-Vietnamese: Thái thượng hoàng).

===== Promotion of Chữ Nôm script =====
Under the Hồ dynasty, the Chữ nôm script was promoted by the Hồ over Classical Chinese to write the vernacular Vietnamese language.

=== Final years ===
In 1402 the army of the Hồ dynasty under general Đỗ Mãn made significant inroads against Champa, prompting the Champa king to cede large territory to Vietnam.

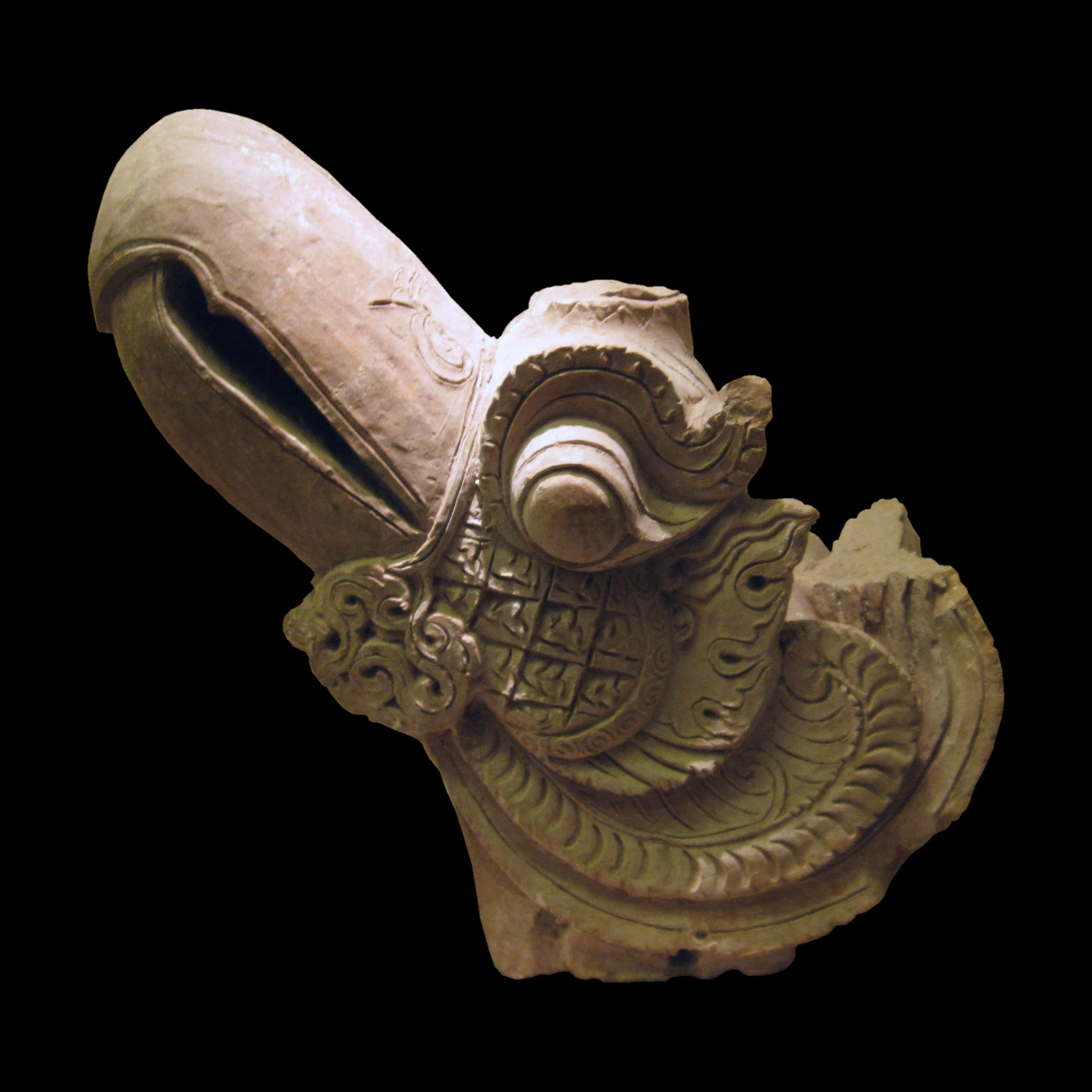
Terracotta Phoenix head used as architectural decoration, from the 14th–15th century

== Hồ Hán Thương, emperor 1401–06 ==
=== Foreign diplomacy ===
Stable relations with the Ming dynasty were Hồ Quý Ly's foremost concern. Unfortunately, this matter proved impossible for the Hồ to pursue by that time of civil unrest. The descendants of the deposed Trần dynasty had begun agitating against the "usurper" Hồ Quý Ly. This internal disquiet kept the country in chaos and allowed an opportunity for the Ming to conquer Đại Việt with the help of the Trần sympathizers.

In May 1403, Hồ Quý Ly's requested the recognition of his son from the Ming court on the account that the Trần lineage had died out and that his son was an imperial nephew. Unaware of Hồ's coup, the Yongle Emperor granted him this request.

In October 1404, a Trần Thiên Bính (陳添平) arrived at the Ming court in Nanjing, claiming to be a Trần prince, and appealed to the Yongle Emperor to press his claim to the throne. However, in the 1395 Ancestral injunctions, the Yongle Emperor's father, the Hongwu Emperor, specifically ordered that China should never attack Annam – the Yongle Emperor thus took no action until early 1405, when a Vietnamese envoy confirmed the pretender's story, whereupon he issued an edict reprimanding Hồ Quý Ly and demanding that the Trần be restored.

Hồ Quý Ly had doubts about the pretender's claims, but nevertheless agreed to receive the pretender as king. Thus, Trần Thiên Bính was escorted back by a military convoy, accompanied by a Ming ambassador. However, on 4 April 1406, as the party crossed the border into Lạng Sơn, Hồ's forces ambushed them and killed both the prince and the Ming ambassador. Hồ also begun harassing the southern border of the Ming.

=== Downfall ===
On 11 May 1406, the Yongle Emperor sent two forces for an invasion. Zhu Neng, Duke of Chengguo, was appointed Commander-in-Chief, Zhang Fu, Marquis of Xincheng, and Mu Sheng, Marquis of Xiping, were appointed Vice-Generals of the Right and of the Left, respectively. (Zhu died of illness en route and was replaced by Zhang) The Ming Shilu 2 December 1407 entry recorded the Yongle Emperor's order to Marquis Zhang Fu not to harm any innocent Vietnamese. In 1407, the fall of Da Bang fortress, and the defeats of the Hồ at Moc Pham Giang and Ham Tu all precipitated the fall of the Hồ dynasty. At the Ham Tu battle, the Hồ family tried to escape the enemy but was caught by the Ming and sent to exile in China.

=== Economy and finance ===
Hồ Quý Ly initiated the introduction of the a country-wide paper currency around 1399 or 1400. His other reforms included land reform, opening of ports to foreign trade, reform of the judiciary, health care and opening the education system to study mathematics and agriculture alongside Confucian texts.

== See also ==
- List of Vietnamese dynasties
- Citadel of the Hồ Dynasty
- Nam Ông mộng lục

Preceded by Trần dynasty	Dynasty of Vietnam; 1400–1407	Succeeded by Fourth Chinese rule/Later Trần dynasty
