= Hồ Hán Thương =

2nd and final emperor of Hồ-dynasty Vietnam from 1401 to 1407

Hồ Hán Thương 胡漢蒼
- Emperor of Đại Ngu
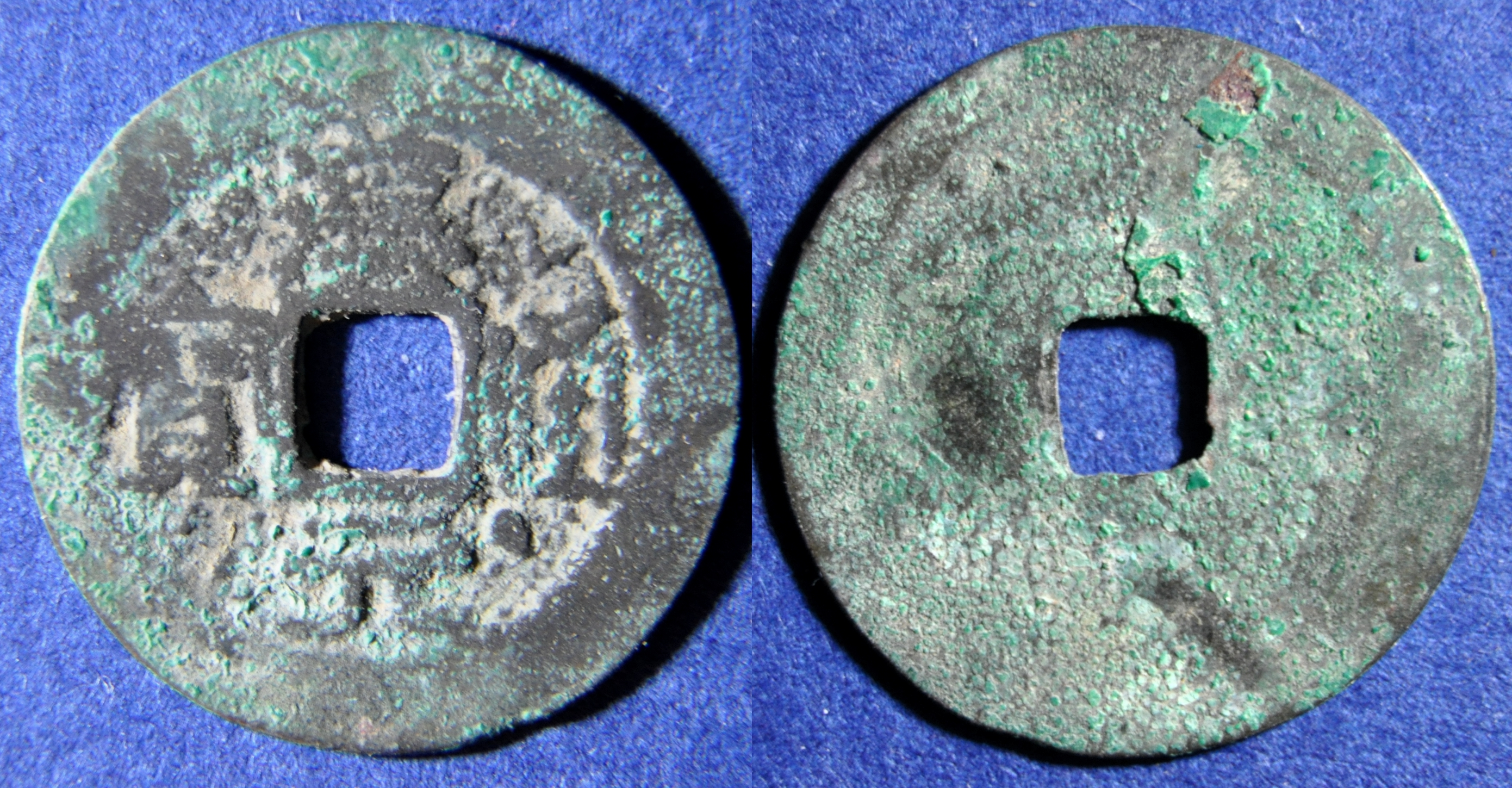
- Coin during Hồ Hán Thương's reign

Emperor of the Hồ dynasty
- Reign: 1401–1407
- Predecessor: Hồ Quý Ly
- Successor: None (Hồ dynasty disestablished); Giản Định Đế
- Born: ?
- Died: 1407?
- Spouse: Hiến Gia
- Issue: Hồ Nhuế
Names
- Lê Hán Thương (黎漢蒼); Hồ Hỏa (胡踝)
Era dates
- Thiệu Thành (紹成, 1401–1402); Khai Đại (開大, 1403–1407)
- House: Hồ
- Dynasty: Hồ dynasty
- Father: Hồ Quý Ly
- Mother: Huy Ninh

Hồ Hán Thương (chữ Hán: 胡漢蒼, ?–1407?) was the second and final emperor of the short-lived Hồ dynasty of Đại Ngu (now Viet Nam).^{α}

Hán Thương, his father Hồ Quý Ly, and his son Nhuế, were captured by the Ming forces during the Ming–Hồ War in June 1407 and died in exile in China.

== Notes ==
^α The Hồ Dynasty (1400–1407) renamed the country Đại Ngu, with Tây Đô as the capital.

Hồ Hán Thương Hồ Dynasty
Preceded by Hồ Quý Ly	Emperor of Đại Ngu; 1401–1407	Succeeded by Giản Định Đế
