= Hồ Quý Ly =

Emperor of Vietnam from 1400 to 1401

Hồ Quý Ly 胡季犛
- Emperor of Đại Ngu

Emperor of Dai Ngu state
- Reign: 1400–1401
- Predecessor: Trần Thiếu Đế
- Successor: Hồ Hán Thương

Retired Emperor of the Hồ Dynasty
- Reign: 1401–1407
- Born: 1336; Đại Lại village, Vĩnh Ninh district, Ái Châu, Thanh Đô town, Đại Việt
- Died: 22 October 1407 (aged 70–71)
- Spouse: Huy Ninh, daughter of Trần Minh Tông
- Issue: Hồ Nguyên Trừng, unknown who is the mother Hồ Hán Thương, son of Princess Huy Ninh; Princess Thánh Ngâu, daughter of Princess Huy Ninh; later as Empress Khâm Thánh of Trần Thuận Tông
Names
- Lê Quý Ly (黎季犛), later Hồ Quý Ly (胡季犛)
Era dates
- Thánh Nguyên (聖元)
- House: Hồ
- Father: Lê Quốc Mạo
- Mother: Lady Phạm

Hồ Quý Ly (chữ Hán: 胡季犛, 1336 – 1407?) ruled Đại Ngu (Vietnam) from 1400 to 1401 as the founding emperor of the short-lived Hồ dynasty. Quý Ly rose from a post as an official served the court of the ruling Trần dynasty and a military general fought against the Cham forces during the Cham–Vietnamese War (1367–1390). After his military defeat in the Ming Conquest of Dai Ngu (1406–1407), he and his son were captured as prisoners and were exiled to China, while the Dai Ngu became the thirteenth province of Ming Empire.

== Biography ==
=== Early career ===
Hồ Quý Ly was born in 1336 at Đại Lại village, Vĩnh Ninh district, Ái Châu, Thanh Đô town with aristocracy's standing. His birth name was Lê Quý Ly (黎季犛), courtesy name Lý Nguyên (理元) or Nhất Nguyên (一元), as he was adopted by Lê Huan, after whom he took the family name. Descended from a Chinese family named Hu who had migrated from modern Zhejiang (China) to Dien Chau (modern-day Thanh Hóa) in the tenth century, he adopted the Vietnamese surname Lê to appeal to the local elite. Two of Quý Ly's paternal aunts first came to the court of king Tran Nghe Tong (r. 1370–1372) and were honored in 1371 and 1372; this enabled Ho Quy Ly's rise to power. In 1371, he married a princess of king Tran Minh Tong after finishing a commission of the king.

=== Rise to power ===
At the time, power in Dai Viet remained in the hands of the royal family and the aristocracy. In 1375, through beneficial royal contacts, Quý Ly received a high military rank. In June 1376, Che Bong Nga of Champa launched an offensive into Hoa Chau. King Tran Due Tong (r. 1373–1377) called the army for a counterattack. Quý Ly was responsible for transporting supplies and army from Nghe An, Tan Binh and Thuan Hoa, while general Do Tu Binh commanded the army. The campaign became disastrous in January 1377 as king Due Tong was killed in battle and prince Tran Huc was captured; only Do Tu Binh and Le Quý Ly were able to flee. Le Quý Ly disappeared from politics for two years. Following the victory in Vijaya, Che Bong Nga's army rapidly advanced into the Red River Delta and sacked Hanoi, gaining control of vast territories including Thanh Hoa and Nghe An.

In 1380, Quý Ly joined Do Tu Binh in fending off a Cham attack in Thanh Hoa. In 1382, Che Bong Nga launched another northward assault into Thanh Hoa by both land and sea. A local general named Nguyen Da Phuong, put aside Quý Ly's orders and left his position to attack, inflicting a series of defeats on the Cham forces and forcing them to withdraw back to the south. In early 1383, a large fleet of Quý Ly was cancelled due to a storm. In summer, Che Bong Nga launched a new offensive through the mountains in today Eastern Laos, bypassing Quý Ly's position, and attacked Son Tay from the west. King Nghe Tong ordered troops to stop and repulse the Cham advances, but they were routed and a Vietnamese commander was captured. The king once again fled north across the Red River while Cham troops sacked Hanoi, occupying it for six months before their departure.

=== As a chief minister ===
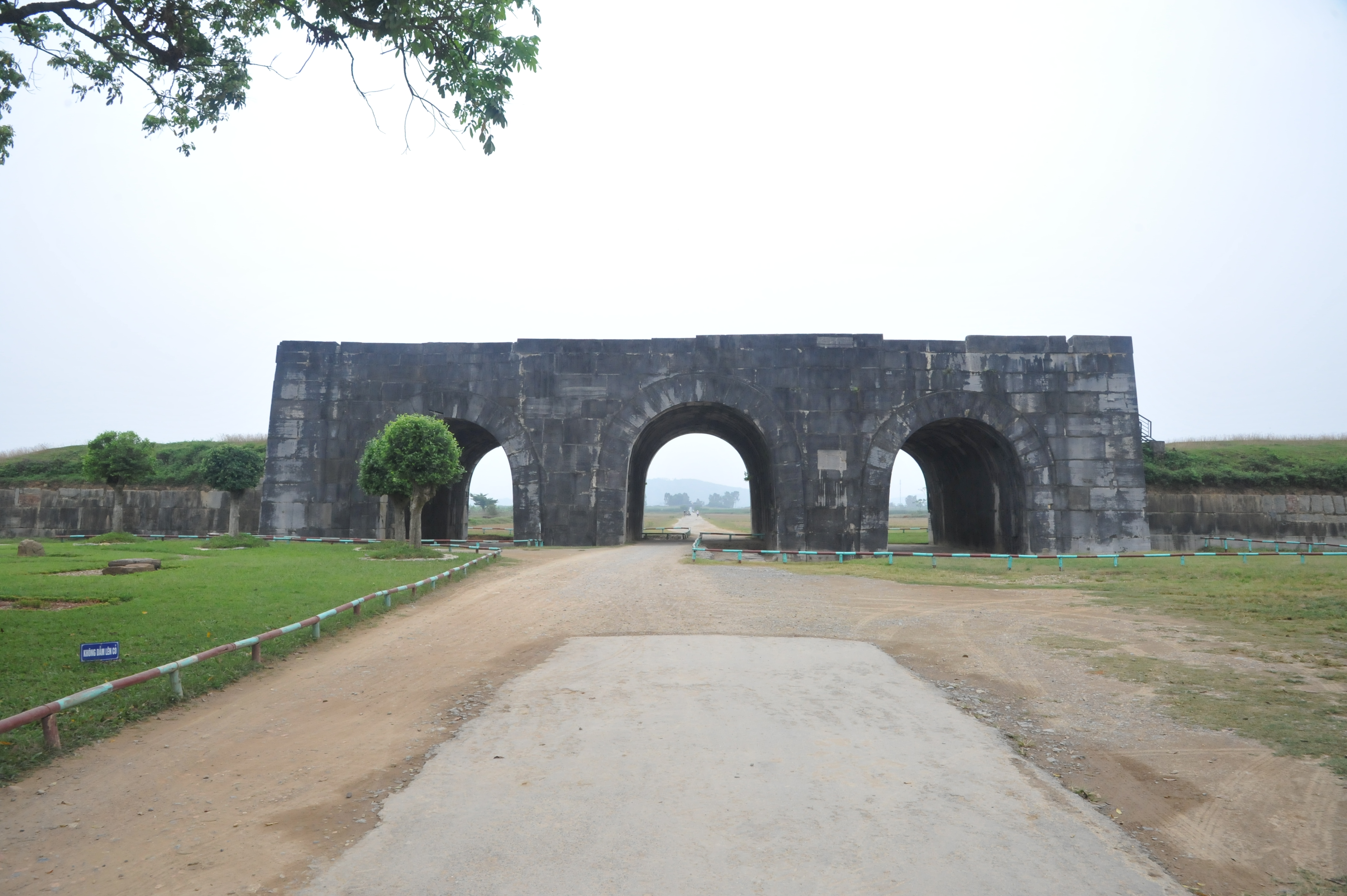
The city of Tây Đô was built by Hồ Quý Ly in 1397.

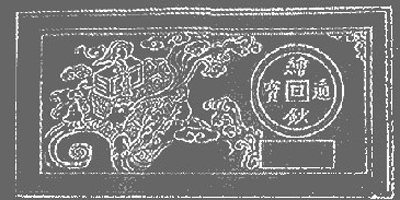
Thông Bảo hội sao, a banknote issued by Hồ Quý Ly.

In March 1387, Nghe Tong returned to the capital and Quý Ly was appointed chief minister. By September, anti-Quy Ly faction began emerging in the court. Le A Phu, an official, had warned Prince Ngac about Quý Ly and secretly sent an offer to Tran Phe De (r. 1377–1388) seeking Quý Ly's death. However, the conspiracy was leaked. With advice from Pham Cu Luan, Quý Ly came to the old king Nghe Tong, urged to purge the young king Phe De and place Prince Ngung on the throne. In 1388, Tran Phe De was dethroned and executed, along with Le A Phu and other supporters. Prince Ngu was crowned as Tran Thuan Tong (r. 1389–1398). Quý Ly promptly married his eldest daughter to Thuan Tong while continued placing his own men to the government.

In mid-1389, chaos and revolts against Quý Ly occurred in Thanh Hoa. Take advantage, Che Bong Nga launched a new attack on Thanh Hoa. Quý Ly led an army to against them but was badly defeated. Quý Ly asked Nghe Tong for royal warships, but he preferred to keep them in defense of the capital. In late 1389, a Buddhist monk from Son Tay led a revolt against the court, attacked the capital and forced two monarchs Nghe Tong and Thuan Tong to flee to Bac Ninh. As the same time, troops were rallied to put down the rebellion while the Cham forces remained themselves in southern Delta. In February 1390, the Vietnamese inflicted a heavy defeat on the Chams that ended the war. The great Cham king was killed and his general La Ngai fled to the south, proclaimed as Jaya Simhavarman VI.Book of Documents

In 1392, through manipulating Nghe Tong, Quý Ly removed Tran Nhat Chuong, a member of the royal family for plotting to assassinate him. In later that year, he established the first strong centralized system to patrol the country. He also introduced classical Chinese Confucian learning and doctrines into the Vietnamese state. In opposite, two of the top Vietnamese scholars, Dao Su Tich and Doan Su Loi protested against the new ideology. In 1393, Quý Ly held the first examination for both classical scholars and low officials. His reforms received fully supports and encourage from the old king Nghe Tong. In January 1395, Nghe Tong died. Quy Ly's first move was translating the Book of Documents into Nom. In the same year, he forbade officials to wear broad-sleeve garments, allowing only narrow sleeves. In the next year, he set up entire the government dresses. He issued the first Vietnamese banknotes. Quy Ly worked on many aspect, tried to integrate Chinese classic learning and Confucianism into the Vietnamese state. In early 1397, he ordered the construction of a new capital in northwest Thanh Hoa. He renamed the old capital Hanoi to Dong Do, while his new capital is called Tay Do.

In early 1398, Quý Ly manipulated king Thuan Tong into abdicating. He appointed the two-year-old Prince An as king Tran Thieu De (r. 1398–1400). In 1399 Quý Ly moved the abdicated Thuan Tong into isolation.

=== Reign and exile ===
In 1400, Quý Ly dethroned the last Trần emperor and declared himself emperor, establishing his clan in royal positions and renaming the kingdom from Đại Việt to Đại Ngu. Encountering a failed coup by the Trần, Quý Ly suppressed dissenters by executing 370 dissidents, seizing their possessions, enslaving their female relatives, and burying alive or drowning males of all ages.

In 1401, he abdicated in favor of his second son Hồ Hán Thương, who also the grandson of Tran Minh Tong. In accordance with the former Trần dynasty's tradition, Hồ Quý Ly styled himself as Emperor Emeritus and still possessed much power over state affairs. From 1400 to 1403, Hồ Quý Ly and his son, Hồ Hán Thương sent three expeditions against Champa. The first and third expeditions ended with Champa's defensive victory; however the second one (1402) resulted in the Champa King Jaya Simhavarman V relinquishing southern Quảng Nam and northern Quảng Ngãi to Dai Viet.

In 1407, he was captured by Ming forces in Thiên Cầm cave and was exiled to China. He was forced to enlist in the Ming army as a common soldier. It is not clear when he died. His son, Hồ Hán Thương, and grandson, Hồ Nhuế, also died in Chinese exile.

== Family ==
- Forefather : Hồ Hưng Dật
- Father : Hồ Quốc Mạo
- Mother : Phạm Thị Mỗ
- Brothers : Hồ Quý Đôn, Hồ Quý Uông, Hồ Quý Mỗ, Hồ Quý Hàm, Hồ Quý Tì
- Spouses : Huy Ninh Princess, Thái Từ Empress, Nguyễn Thị Mỗ
- Children : Hồ Nguyên Trừng (general), Hồ Hán Thương (second emperor), Hồ Thánh Ngâu (Trần dynasty's empress)
- Grandchildren : Hồ Nhuế (crown prince), Hồ Ngũ Lang, Hồ Vô Cữu, Hồ Tử Chương, Hồ Tử Việp, Trần Thiếu Đế

== Works ==
- Quốc ngữ thi nghĩa (國語詩義)
- Minh đạo lục (明道錄)

== Speech ==
You inquire about the state of affairs in Annan.
Annan's customs are simple and pure.
Moreover, official clothing is according to the Tang system.
The rites and music that control intercourse between the ruler
and the officials
are those of the Han.
The jade brush unfolds new laws.
The gold sword slices the scales of armor.
Every year in the second or third month
Peach and plum seeds are planted in spring.

— Hồ Quý Ly describing his country to a Ming dynasty envoy through a poem

== Legacy ==
Hồ Quý Ly has been a subject of controversial debates among Vietnamese historians, some scholars value his radical thoughts and reformation, while others regard him as a usurper. He ordered the construction of a citadel in Thanh Hóa Province. The remnants of this citadel are included in UNESCO's list of World Heritage Sites.

Hồ Quý Ly Hồ dynasty
Preceded by Trần Thiếu Đế as Emperor of the Trần dynasty	Emperor of Đại Ngu; 1400–1401	Succeeded by Hồ Hán Thương
