= Ái Châu province =

Historic province of China located in modern-day Vietnam

Ái Châu, alternatively rendered as Aizhou (Chinese: 愛州; pinyin: Aìzhoū), was a historical province of China, located in modern-day Thanh Hóa province, Vietnam. The administrative division was established during the third period of Chinese rule in Vietnam.

In 989 after an upland chieftain, named Dương Tiến Lục, had reported to Lê Hoàn that local militia from the aboriginal prefectures of Ái Châu and Hoan Châuse planned to resist control by the Early Lê dynasty, the king authorised an attack on the prefectures.
