= Trần Thuận Tông =

Trần Thuận Tông 陳順宗
- Emperor of Đại Việt

Emperor of the Trần dynasty
- Reign: 27 December 1388 – 15 March 1398
- Predecessor: Trần Phế Đế
- Successor: Trần Thiếu Đế

Retired Emperor of the Trần dynasty
- Reign: 1398–1399
- Predecessor: Trần Nghệ Tông
- Successor: none
- Born: 1378; Thang Long, Vietnam
- Died: April 1399 (aged 20–21); Đại Việt
- Burial: Yên Sinh Lăng
- Spouse: Queen Thánh Ngâu
Names
- Trần Ngung (陳顒)
Era dates
- Quang Thái (光泰, 1388–1398)
Regnal name
- Nguyên Hoàng (元皇)
Posthumous name
- none
Temple name
- Thuận Tông (順宗)
- House: Trần dynasty
- Father: Trần Nghệ Tông
- Mother: Queen Thục Đức
- Religion: Buddhism

Trần Thuận Tông (1378 – April 1399), given name Trần Ngung, was the eleventh emperor of the Trần dynasty who reigned in Đại Việt from 1388 to 1398. He was chosen to succeed to this position by his father, the Retired Emperor Trần Nghệ Tông, after Nghệ Tông decided to dethrone and force Trần Phế Đế to commit suicide. Although holding the position emperor for ten years and retired emperor for one more year, Thuận Tông's reign was totally under the control of Nghệ Tông and Hồ Quý Ly. It was Hồ Quý Ly who obliged Thuận Tông to change the capital from Thăng Long to Thanh Hóa, Hồ Quý Ly was also responsible for the resignation of Thuận Tông as emperor and his death afterward. Only one year after Thuận Tông's death, the Trần dynasty collapsed while Hồ Quý Ly established his own dynasty, the Hồ dynasty.

== Background ==
Thuận Tông was born in 1378 as Trần Ngung, the youngest son of the Retired Emperor Trần Nghệ Tông, and his wife, the Queen Thục Đức. After the dethronement and forced suicide of Trần Phế Đế in December 1387, Prince Chiêm Định Trần Ngung, only ten at that time, was chosen by his father for the position of successor as Trần Thuận Tông. The new era name under Thuận Tông's reign was Quang Thái (光泰, 1388–1398).

== As emperor ==
Trần Thuận Tông

Vietnamese name
- Vietnamese: Trần Thuận Tông
- Hán-Nôm: 陳順宗

Although being the Emperor of Vietnam (Đại Việt), Phế Đế only reigned in name because it was Nghệ Tông and Hồ Quý Ly who held the real power. In January 1389, Thuận Tông married the eldest daughter of Hồ Quý Ly as Queen Thánh Ngâu.

Less than one year from Thuận Tông's coronation, Chế Bồng Nga continued to attack Đại Việt in October 1389. Under the command of Hồ Quý Ly, Đại Việt's army suffered a heavy defeat in Thanh Hóa which made Hồ Quý Ly fled from the battle and left the position for his subordinate. After this rout, Hồ Quý Ly resigned from the military leader and general Trần Khát Chân was appointed by Nghệ Tông to take charge of stopping Champa. In January 1390, Trần Khát Chân had a decisive victory over Champa which resulted in the death of Chế Bồng Nga and thus the stable situation in southern border of Đại Việt. At home, Trần's dynasty also had to face with several revolts ignited by famine and Chế Bồng Nga's stimulation. In December 1389, the revolt led by monk Phạm Sư Ôn even attacked Thăng Long and forced Nghệ Tông and Thuận Tông flee to Bắc Giang before general Phụ Thế brought his troops from the front line with Champa back to pacify the revolt and kill Phạm Sư Ôn.

- Birth name
- Vietnamese alphabet: Trần Ngung
- Hán-Nôm: 陳顒

During the reign of Thuận Tông, Hồ Quý Ly gradually eliminated all opponents in the royal court such as Nguyễn Đa Phương, who was forced to commit suicide in 1389, Prince Trang Định Trần Ngạc, who was killed by order of Quý Ly in 1391 or Trần Nhật Chương who was killed after Nghệ Tông's decision in 1392. Trần Nghệ Tông deceased on December 15 of Lunar calendar, 1394 at the age of 73 and left the royal court in the total control of Hồ Quý Ly. He began to reform the administrative and examination systems of the Trần dynasty and eventually obliged Thuận Tông to change the capital from Thăng Long to Thanh Hóa in January 1397.

On March 15 of Lunar calendar, 1398, under pressure of Hồ Quý Ly, Thuận Tông, had to cede the throne to his three-year-old son Trần An, now Trần Thiếu Đế, and held the title Retired Emperor at age 20. According to the Đại Việt sử kí toàn thư, actually Hồ Quý Ly wanted to overthrow Thuận Tông but before his death, Nghệ Tông made Quý Ly promise him supporting the Emperor therefore Hồ Quý Ly decided to force Thuận Tông resign before taking over the throne from the new emperor.

Finally, Hồ Quý Ly ordered a general to kill Thuận Tông in 1399 and buried the Retired Emperor in Yên Sinh Lăng. Two powerful figures in the royal court—Trần Khát Chân and Trần Hãng—were also killed not long after the death of Thuận Tông and the Trần dynasty collapsed in 1400 when Hồ Quý Ly established his own dynasty, the Hồ dynasty.

== Family ==
Trần Thuận Tông had one wife, Queen Thánh Ngâu who was Hồ Quý Ly's daughter and one son, Crown Prince Trần An who became the emperor Trần Thiếu Đế, the last emperor of the Trần dynasty.

Trần Thuận Tông House of Trần Born: 1378 Died: 1399
Regnal titles
| Preceded by Trần Phế Đế | Emperor of the Trần dynasty 1388–1398 | Succeeded by Trần Thiếu Đế |
| Preceded by Trần Nghệ Tông | Retired Emperor of the Trần dynasty 1398–1399 | Succeeded by none |
