= Trần Phế Đế =

Trần Phế Đế 陳廢帝
- Emperor of Đại Việt

Emperor of Trần dynasty
- Reign: 15 March 1377 – 6 December 1388
- Predecessor: Trần Duệ Tông
- Successor: Trần Thuận Tông
- Born: 6 March 1361; Thăng Long, Đại Việt
- Died: 6 December 1388 (aged 27); Thăng Long, Đại Việt
- Burial: An Bài Sơn
- Spouse: Queen Quang Loan
- Issue: Prince Thuận Đức
Names
- Trần Hiện
Era dates
- Xương Phù (昌符, 1377–1388)
Regnal name
- Giản Hoàng (簡皇)
Posthumous name
- none
- House: Trần dynasty
- Father: Trần Duệ Tông
- Mother: Dowager Empress Gia Từ
- Religion: Buddhism

Trần Phế Đế (6 March 1361 – 6 December 1388), given name Trần Hiện, was the tenth emperor of the Trần dynasty who reigned Đại Việt from 1377 to 1388. After his father's death in Battle of Đồ Bàn in January 1377, Phế Đế was enthroned as Đại Việt Emperor by the Retired Emperor Trần Nghệ Tông who acted as Phế Đế's regent during his reign. Fearing the rise of Hồ Quý Ly in royal court, Phế Đế tried to reduce his power but Hồ Quý Ly already got ahead of this plot by a defamation campaign against the Emperor which ultimately made Nghệ Tông decide to dethrone Phế Đế in December 1388. Phế Đế was downgraded to Prince Linh Đức and forced to commit suicide and his supporters in royal court were purged by Hồ Quý Ly faction. The death of Phế Đế marked the last step of Hồ Quý Ly's power seizing from Trần clan.

== Background ==
Phế Đế (Deposed Emperor) was born in 1361 as Trần Hiện, second child of the Prince Cung Tuyên Trần Kính, then Emperor Trần Duệ Tông, and his wife Lady Lê, then Queen Gia Từ. Initially, Duệ Tông wanted to make his first son Prince Chương Vũ Trần Vĩ crown prince but Trần Vĩ soon died during Duệ Tông's reign so Prince Kiến Đức Trần Hiện became the first in line of successor.

In January 1377, after the Battle of Đồ Bàn in which Duệ Tông and seventy percent of his troops were killed by Champa's army, the Retired Emperor Nghệ Tông decided to cede the vacant throne to Prince Kiến Đức. After the coronation, Phế Đế changed the era name to Xương Phù (昌符, 1377–1388).

== As emperor ==
Trần Phế Đế

Vietnamese name
- Vietnamese: Trần Phế Đế
- Hán-Nôm: 陳廢帝

Although being the Emperor of Đại Việt, Phế Đế was only a de jure ruler because it was regent Nghệ Tông who still held the real power. According to Đại Việt sử ký toàn thư, Phế Đế was actually worse than his father, he had a weak and ignorant character which was profited by Hồ Quý Ly in his gradual control of royal court.

After the major defeat of Duệ Tông at Đồ Bàn, Champa's force continued to attack Đại Việt several times, unable to stop Chế Bồng Nga's troops, Trần's rulers even decided to hide royal treasure and worshiping objects, on Mount Thienkien and the Kha-lang Caves, fearing that Chế Bồng Nga's troop might capture the royal palace in Thăng Long. Besides the threat from Champa, Phế Đế and his regent Nghệ Tông also had to face with many inside revolts ignited by famine and Chế Bồng Nga's stimulation.

- Birth name
- Vietnamese alphabet: Trần Hiện
- Hán-Nôm: 陳晛

In May 1380, Trần's army under the command of Hồ Quý Ly had the first victory over Champa's troops in Thanh Hóa. After this point, general Đỗ Tử Bình resigned from the position of highest commander of Tran army and thus Hồ Quý Ly began to hold all civil and military power in royal court. Despite another victory by the troops of general Nguyễn Đa Phương in February 1382, Trần Dynasty had to suffer a severe attack from Chế Bồng Nga in June 1383 which made Nghệ Tông fled from capital Thăng Long in spite of the begging advice to stay from his mandarins. This decision of Nghệ Tông was heavily criticized by the historian Ngô Sĩ Liên in his work Đại Việt sử kí toàn thư as a "coward decision". In the northern border, Ming dynasty also began to expose their ambition of invading southern kingdoms like Đại Việt and Champa.

Facing the unstoppable rise of Hồ Quý Ly in royal court, Phế Đế plotted with minister Trần Ngạc to reduce Hồ Quý Ly's power but Hồ Quý Ly already got ahead of this plot by a defamation campaign against the Emperor which ultimately made Nghệ Tông decide to dethrone and downgrade Phế Đế to Prince Linh Đức in December 1388. Some loyal generals of Phế Đế tried to bring troops in royal palace to overturn this decision, but they were stopped by Phế Đế himself soon before his forced suicide by the order of Nghệ Tông. On December 27 of Lunar calendar, 1387, Nghệ Tông passed the throne to his youngest son Trần Ngung, now Trần Thuận Tông, who was only eleven. In the meantime, Hồ Quý Ly faction purged Phế Đế's supporters so that Hồ Quý Ly became the most powerful man in royal court. After the coronation, Thuận Tông had Phế Đế buried at An Bài Mountain.

== Family ==
Trần Phế Đế had one wife, Queen Quang Loan, who was Nghệ Tông's daughter, and one son, Prince Thuận Đức.

Trần Phế Đế House of Trần Born: 1361 Died: 1388
Regnal titles
| Preceded by Trần Duệ Tông | Emperor of Trần dynasty 1377–1378 | Succeeded by Trần Thuận Tông |
