= Dương Nhật Lễ =

Duke Hôn Đức 昏德公
- Emperor of Đại Việt

Emperor of Trần dynasty
- Reign: 1369–1370
- Predecessor: Trần Dụ Tông
- Successor: Trần Nghệ Tông
- Died: 1 December 1370; Thăng Long, Đại Việt
- Burial: Đại Mông mountain, Đại Việt
- Issue: no heir
Names
- Dương Nhật Lễ
Era dates
- Đại Định (大定, 1369–1370)
Posthumous name
- none
Temple name
- none
- House: Trần dynasty
- Father: Trần Nguyên Dục (陳元昱)

Duke Hôn Đức (Vietnamese: Hôn Đức Công, chữ Hán: 昏德公, ? – 1 December 1370), real name Dương Nhật Lễ (楊日禮), was the emperor of Đại Việt from 1369 to 1370. Although not coming from the Trần clan, Dương Nhật Lễ was ceded the throne of the Trần Dynasty by an edict of Emperor Trần Dụ Tông shortly before his death. During his short reign, Dương Nhật Lễ tried to change his family name back to Dương, which enraged members of the royal family and ultimately resulted in his deposal and death and the coronation of Trần Nghệ Tông. The rise and fall of Dương Nhật Lễ was the starting point for a series of chaotic events in the royal court that led to the collapse of the Trần Dynasty.

== Background ==
Dương Nhật Lễ was the son of a couple of tuồng actors, which, along with other performing arts, was considered a shameful profession under the Confucian system of the time. His father was Dương Khương while the stage name of his mother was Vương Mẫu (Queen Mother), which came from her most recurrent role. While pregnant, she was made a consort of Prince Cung Túc Trần Dục who was the son of Trần Minh Tông and elder brother of the reigning Emperor. Nhật Lễ was born in the palace and was adopted by Prince Cung Túc as his own son.

Being an impotent man, Emperor Dụ Tông did not have any children, so appointed his brother's son Nhật Lễ as his successor. This decision was heavily criticized by contemporary historians because it broke the traditional regulation in succession and brought a chaotic period to the Trần Dynasty. Twenty days after Dụ Tông's death on the 25th day of the 5th month (Lunar calendar) in 1369, Queen Mother Hiến Từ upheld the Emperor's will by inviting Nhật Lễ to the royal palace for the coronation, despite the strong opposition from royal family members and mandarins and a plan made by the royal court to enthrone Prince Cung Định Trần Phủ against the late emperor's will. According to Đại Việt sử ký toàn thư, the Queen Mother reasoned that because Trần Dục was not passed the throne even though he was Minh Tông's eldest prince, therefore Nhật Lễ, who was Trần Dục's son, deserved the position.

== As emperor and death ==
After the enthronement, Nhật Lễ changed the era name to Đại Định (大定, great peace, 1369–1370) and made the daughter of Prince Cung Định Trần Phủ his queen consort. Only half a year after taking the throne, the new emperor ordered the poisoning of the Great Queen Mother Hiến Từ, who had begun to regret her support for the coronation of Nhật Lễ.

Like his predecessor Dụ Tông, Nhật Lễ neglected his administrative duties and concentrated only on drinking, theatre and wandering. He even wanted to change his family name back to Dương. Such activities disappointed everyone in the royal court. This once prompted the Prime Minister Trần Nguyên Trác and his son Trần Nguyên Tiết to plot the assassination of Nhật Lễ, but their conspiracy was discovered by the Emperor and they were killed afterwards. In the tenth month of 1370, the Emperor's father-in-law, Trần Phủ, after receiving advice from several mandarins and members of the royal family, decided to raise an army for the purpose of overthrowing Nhật Lễ. After one month, his plan succeeded and Trần Phủ became the new emperor of Đại Việt, ruling as Trần Nghệ Tông, while Nhật Lễ was downgraded to Duke of Hôn Đức (Hôn Đức Công). Trần Trọng Kim in his history text Việt Nam sử lược had a slightly different version of this event in which the overthrow plot was made by royal court mandarins and not by Trần Phủ himself. Kim claims that Trần Phủ was only enthroned after the success of the plot and the death of Nhật Lễ.

Subsequently, Hôn Đức Công killed a mandarin named Ngô Lang who had advised him to surrender and abdicate the throne to Nghệ Tông. Being informed of the death of Ngô Lang, the new emperor had Hôn Đức Công and his son beaten to death. Their bodies were buried in Đại Mông mountain. After the death of Hôn Đức Công, his mother fled to Champa and begged King Chế Bồng Nga to attack Đại Việt. Taking advantage of the neighbour's lack of political stability, Chế Bồng Nga commanded troops and directly assaulted Thăng Long, the capital of Đại Việt. The Trần army could not withstand this attack and the Trần royal court had to escape from Thăng Long, creating an opportunity for Chế Bồng Nga to violently loot the capital before withdrawing.

== Family ==
Dương Nhật Lễ had one queen consort, who was a daughter of the future emperor Trần Nghệ Tông, and a son who was beaten to death along with him in 1370.

Dương Nhật Lễ Died: 1369
Regnal titles
| Preceded by Trần Dụ Tông | Emperor of Đại Việt; 1369–1370 | Succeeded by Trần Nghệ Tông |
