= Vĩnh Lộc district =

Coordinates: 20.033°N 105.633°E

Vĩnh Lộc district Huyện Vĩnh Lộc
- District
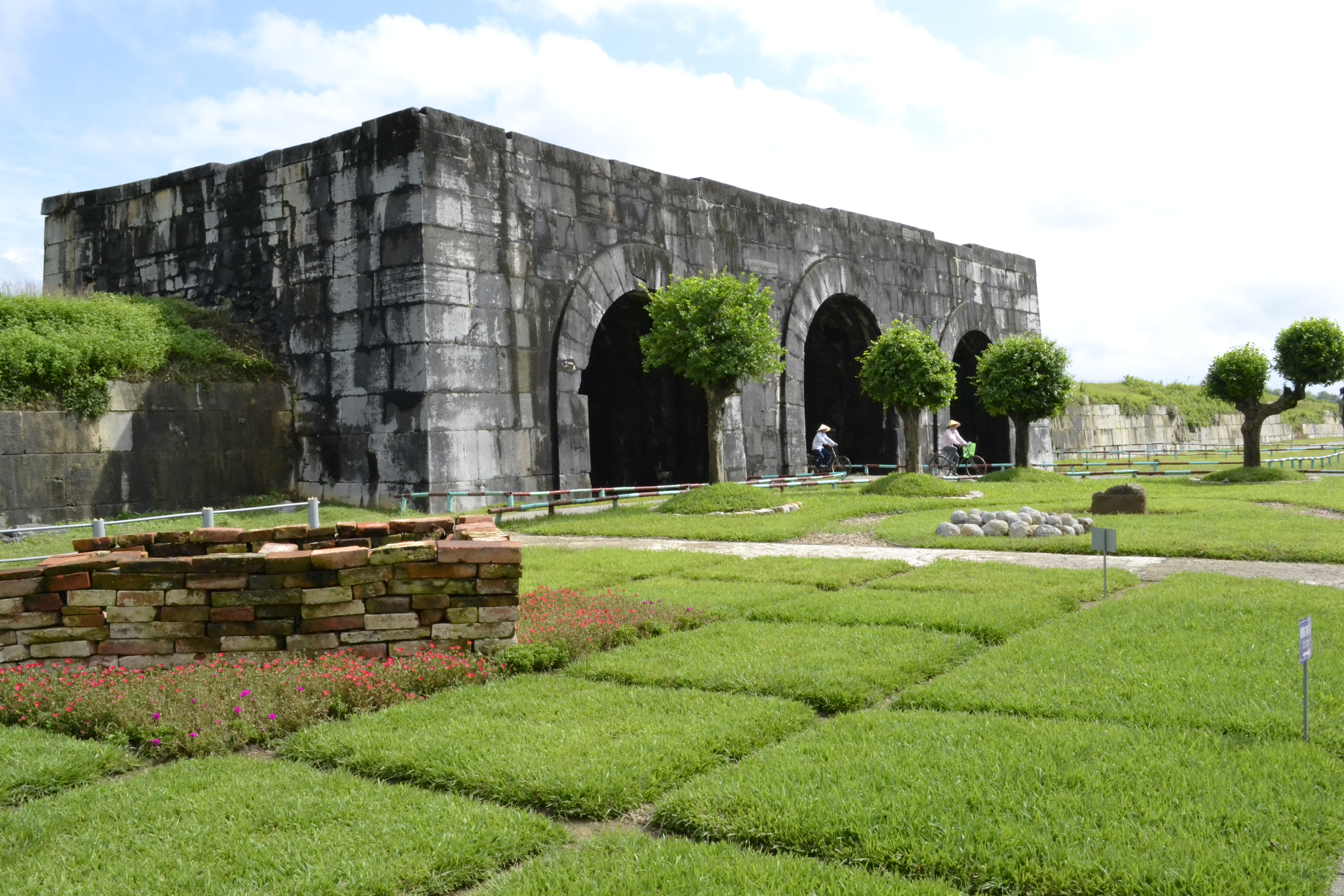
- Citadel of the Hồ Dynasty
- Interactive map of Vĩnh Lộc district
- Country: Vietnam
- Region: North Central Coast
- Province: Thanh Hóa
- Capital: Vĩnh Lộc

Area
  - Total: 61 sq mi (157 km^{2})

Population (2018)
  - Total: 90,440
- Time zone: UTC+7 (UTC + 7)

Vĩnh Lộc is a district of Thanh Hóa province in the North Central Coast region of Vietnam. As of 2003 the district had a population of 87,219. The district covers an area of 157 km^{2}. The district capital lies at Vĩnh Lộc. The village is famous for the Citadel of the Hồ, a short-lived Vietnamese Dynasty (1400-1407), Hồ Quy, the founder of the Dynasty, having built the Citadel in 1397 and moved the capital there in 1401. Since 2011, the Citadel is part of UNESCO World Heritage Sites.

== Administration ==
Vĩnh Lộc is administratively subdivided into 15 communes and 1 township:

1. Vĩnh Lộc Township
2. Commune of Vĩnh Thành
3. Commune of Vĩnh Quang
4. Commune of Vĩnh Yên
5. Commune of Vĩnh Tiến
6. Commune of Vĩnh Long
7. Commune of Vĩnh Phúc
8. Commune of Vĩnh Hưng
9. Commune of Vĩnh Minh
10. Commune of Vĩnh Khang
11. Commune of Vĩnh Hòa
12. Commune of Vĩnh Hùng
13. Commune of Vĩnh Tân
14. Commune of Vĩnh Ninh
15. Commune of Vĩnh Thịnh
16. Commune of Vĩnh An
