= Trần Nghệ Tông =

Trần Nghệ Tông 陳藝宗
- Emperor of Đại Việt

Emperor of the Trần dynasty
- Reign: 15 November 1370 – 9 November 1372
- Predecessor: Hôn Đức Công
- Successor: Trần Duệ Tông

Retired Emperor of the Trần dynasty
- Reign: 9 November 1372 – 15 December 1394 (22 years, 46 days)
- Predecessor: Trần Minh Tông
- Successor: Trần Thuận Tông
- Born: December 20, 1321; Thăng Long, Đại Việt
- Died: January 6, 1395 (aged 73); Thăng Long, Đại Việt
- Burial: Nguyên Lăng
- Spouse: Empress Consort Thục Đức
Names
- Trần Phủ (陳暊)
Era dates
- Thiệu Khánh (紹慶, 1370–1372)
Regnal name
- Thể Thiên Kiến Cực Thuần Hiếu hoàng đế (體天建極純孝皇帝).
Posthumous name
- Quang-nghiêu Anh-triết Emperor (光堯英哲皇帝)
Temple name
- Nghệ Tông (藝宗)
- House: Trần dynasty
- Father: Trần Minh Tông
- Mother: Concubine Lê Thị
- Religion: Buddhism

Trần Nghệ Tông (chữ Hán: 陳藝宗, 20 December 1321 – 6 January 1395), given name Trần Phủ (陳暊), was the eighth emperor of the Trần dynasty who ruled Vietnam from 1370 to 1372.

== Biography ==
=== As prince ===
Nghệ Tông was born in 1321 as Trần Phủ, third son of Emperor Minh Tông and concubine Lê who was the younger sister of Empress Hiến Từ. Under the reign of his eldest brother, Emperor Hiến Tông (1329–1341) and his younger brother, Emperor Dụ Tông (1341–1369), Trần Phủ was designated Prince Cung Định (Vietnamese: Cung Định Vương). When Dương Nhật Lễ took over the throne in 1369, Prince Cung Định became the emperor's father-in-law as Nhật Lễ married his daughter.

During his two-year reign, Emperor Nhật Lễ enraged the imperial court and members of the Trần clan with his irresponsible attitude with the throne and his efforts to change his family name back to Dương, which would mean the end of the Trần dynasty. As a result, there were several plots to overthrow and kill Nhật Lễ; one of these was led by Prince Cung Định himself with help from his brother Prince Cung Tuyên Trần Kính, his sister Princess of Thiên Ninh Trần Ngọc Tha, and the respected Marquis of Chương Túc Trần Nguyên Đán. Ultimately, Prince Cung Tuyên succeeded in re-establishing the Trần hegemony when the mandarin Ngô Lai persuaded Nhật Lễ to surrender and return the throne to the Trần clan. Prince Cung Định was crowned on November 15 of lunar calendar, 1370, as the Emperor Nghệ Tông and decided to change the era name to Thiệu Khánh (紹慶). Dương Nhật Lễ was downgraded to Duke of Hôn Đức (Hôn Đức Công). Subsequently, Nhật Lễ killed Ngô Lai and was subsequently beaten to death by his son under orders from Nghệ Tông.

Nghệ Tông was credited with the re-establishment of the Trần clan's rule in Vietnam after Hôn Đức Công had possessed the throne for nearly two years after the death of Trần Dụ Tông. However, Nghệ Tông proved to be an inefficient ruler during his reign as emperor and afterward as retired emperor from 1372 to his death in 1394. As the retired emperor who oversaw the ruling of his three consecutive successors, Duệ Tông, Phế Đế, and Thuận Tông, Nghệ Tông was responsible for the rise in the imperial court of Đỗ Tử Bình, who left emperor Duệ Tông to die on the battlefield in the Đồ Bàn Battle, and of Hồ Quý Ly who ultimately overthrew the Trần dynasty to found the Hồ dynasty. Nghệ Tông also witnessed many defeats of Đại Việt in the struggle with Champa including the aforementioned Đồ Bàn battle and several attacks by Champa's king Chế Bồng Nga upon the capital Thăng Long. After Nghệ Tông's death, the Trần dynasty fell into chaos and survived for only six more years before Hồ Quý Ly took the throne in 1400.

=== As emperor ===
Nghệ Tông took the absolute power when he was 49 and already had experience within the imperial court, however according to Đại Việt sử ký toàn thư, the Emperor lacked an important quality of a good ruler which is the decisiveness and thus led the Trần dynasty step by step fall into the hand of his officials.

After the coronation, Nghệ Tông tried to restore the order of the imperial court, which was heavily damaged during the reign of Dụ Tông and Nhật Lễ, but the progress came very slowly, partially because he did not have enough competent mandarins like Chu Văn An (who died in 1370) or Trần Nguyên Đán who kept away from the court. Nghệ Tông faced his first failure in March 1371 when the king of Champa Chế Bồng Nga commanded an army that directly attacked Thăng Long, the capital of Đại Việt, after the petition of Nhật Lễ's mother. Unable to confront with the strong and well-organized opponent, the imperial court of the Trần dynasty had to flee from Thăng Long and let the capital be violently looted by Chế Bồng Nga's army. Two months after the Champa's assault, Nghệ Tông appointed Hồ Quý Ly for one of the highest position in imperial court, this was the evidence for the Emperor's confidence in Hồ Quý Ly who had two aunts entitled as consorts of Minh Tông and married the Princess of Huy Ninh, Nghệ Tông's younger sister. The Emperor also chose Đỗ Tử Bình, another notorious official in future, for the position of military counsellor in April 1372.

On November 9 of Lunar calendar, 1372, Nghệ Tông decided to cede the throne to his younger brother, Prince Cung Tuyên Trần Kính who now became the Emperor Trần Duệ Tông, and held the title Retired Emperor to co-rule the country with the Emperor as the tradition of the Trần dynasty.

=== As retired emperor ===
By nature, Duệ Tông was an arrogant and hard-headed ruler who ignored advice from his mandarins about the power of Champa's army, so right after enthronement, he began to prepare a military campaign in the southern border against Chế Bồng Nga's troops. Another factor in the emperor's decision was the apparent refusal of Bồng Nga to pay tribute for Đại Việt; the king of Champa did actually send fifteen trays of gold to Đại Việt as requested, but Đỗ Tử Bình kept the gold for himself and lied to the imperial court that there was no tribute from Champa. After some skirmishes caused by Champa, Duệ Tông began his decisive campaign in December 1376, in which the emperor personally commanded the army, with help from Hồ Quý Ly who took charge of logistics, and Đỗ Tử Bình who commanded the rearguard. Eventually, Đại Việt's army was disastrously defeated in the Đồ Bàn Battle, when the emperor, along with many high-ranking mandarins and generals of the Trần dynasty, was killed by Champa's forces. Quý Ly and Tử Bình managed to survive when both ran away from the battle instead of trying to rescue the emperor. Afterwards, Nghệ Tông demoted Tử Bình to the position of regular soldier, while Quý Ly was not punished at all.

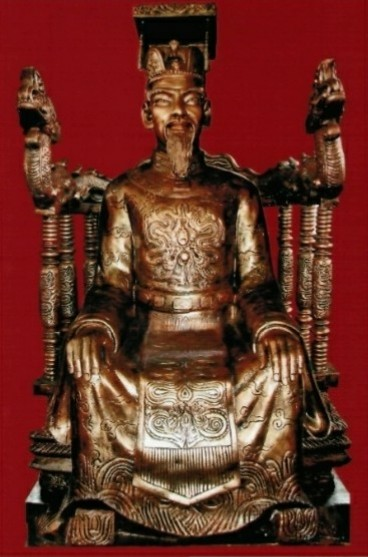
Statue of Emperor Trần Nghệ Tông

After the emperor's death, the retired emperor in May 1377 passed the throne to Duệ Tông's eldest prince, Prince Kiến Đức Trần Hiện, now Trần Phế Đế. By the historical records, Phế Đế was actually worse than his father; he had a weak and ignorant character which was exploited by Hồ Quý Ly in his gradual control of the imperial court. During his reign, the military power was concentrated in the hand of Đỗ Tử Bình, who was incapable of dealing with many attacks from Champa's army. As a result, Nghệ Tông decided to hide money in Lạng Sơn, fearing that Chế Bồng Nga's army might assault and destroy the imperial palace in Thăng Long.

In 1380, Hồ Quý Ly had a minor victory over Chế Bồng Nga's army in Thanh Hóa; as a result, Tử Bình had to give up control of the Đại Việt army to Quý Ly. However, in June 1383, Bồng Nga began a major campaign against Đại Việt, which greatly frightened Nghệ Tông. Ignoring the imperial court's advice, he evacuated Thăng Long, a decision which was heavily criticized by the historian Ngô Sĩ Liên in his work Đại Việt sử kí toàn thư.

In 1387, Nghệ Tông appointed Hồ Quý Ly as Co-Prime Minister (Đồng bình chương sự), giving him as much power as Nghệ Tông's eldest son, Prime Minister Trần Ngạc (Prince Trang Định). Facing this threat, emperor Phế Đế allied with Trần Ngạc to overthrow Quý Ly. However, Quý Ly had already gotten ahead of this plot by a defamation campaign against the emperor which ultimately made Nghệ Tông decide to dethrone Phế Đế in December 1388. Phế Đế was downgraded to Prince Linh Đức and forced to commit suicide while his supporters were defeated in imperial court by Hồ Quý Ly's side. From now on, Quý Ly who held the highest position and power in imperial court.

On December 27 of the lunar calendar, 1387, Nghệ Tông passed the throne to his youngest son Trần Ngung, now Trần Thuận Tông, who was only eleven. The retired emperor also made Hồ Quý Ly's daughter the new empress of Thuận Tông. After another defeat of Đại Việt's army under the command of Hồ Quý Ly by Champa, in November 1389 Nghệ Tông appointed Trần Khát Chân to the position of general over all military operations against Chế Bồng Nga's army. Only a few months after taking charge of the position, Trần Khát Chân had a decisive victory over Champa on January 23, 1390, which resulted in the death of Chế Bồng Nga and thus destabilized the southern border of Đại Việt. However, the Trần government still deteriorated. In 1391, the Prime Minister Trần Ngạc escaped the imperial city in other to make another attempt against Hồ Quý Ly. Having obtained Nghệ Tông's passive approval, Quý Ly ordered general Nguyễn Nhân Liệt to beat Trần Ngạc to death. Another imperial prince, Trần Nhật Chương, was killed in 1392 by order of Nghệ Tông for taking up opposition against Quý Ly.

Trần Nghệ Tông died on December 15 of Lunar calendar, 1394, at the age of 73 and left the imperial court in the control of Hồ Quý Ly. As a result, the Trần dynasty survived for only six years before Hồ Quý Ly overthrew it and established his own reign, the Hồ dynasty.

== Family ==
Trần Nghệ Tông had one wife, Lady Huệ Ý, who died before his coronation and was posthumously named Empress Thục Đức. The emperor had five sons and one daughter:

- Prince Ngự Câu Trần Húc (?–1381) who was killed by Trần Phế Đế
- Trần Thúc Ngạn
- Prince Trang Định Trần Ngạc (?–1391) who was killed by an order of Hồ Quý Ly, Trần Ngạc's son was Trần Quý Khoáng who was afterward enthroned as Emperor of the Later Trần dynasty
- Prince Giản Định Trần Ngỗi (?–1409) who was afterward the Emperor Giản Định of the Later Trần dynasty
- Prince Chiêu Định Trần Ngung (1378–1398) who became the Emperor Trần Thuận Tông
- Princess Thiên Huy Trần Thục Mỹ

== Legacy ==
Most cities in Vietnam have major streets named after him.

Trần Nghệ Tông House of Trần Born: 1321 Died: 1394
Regnal titles
Preceded by Hôn Đức Công	Emperor of Đại Việt; 1370–1372	Succeeded by Trần Duệ Tông
Preceded by Trần Dụ Tông	Emperor of the Trần dynasty 1370–1372	Succeeded by Trần Duệ Tông
Preceded by Trần Minh Tông	Retired Emperor of the Trần dynasty 1372–1394	Succeeded by Trần Thuận Tông
