= Timeline of the Lý dynasty =

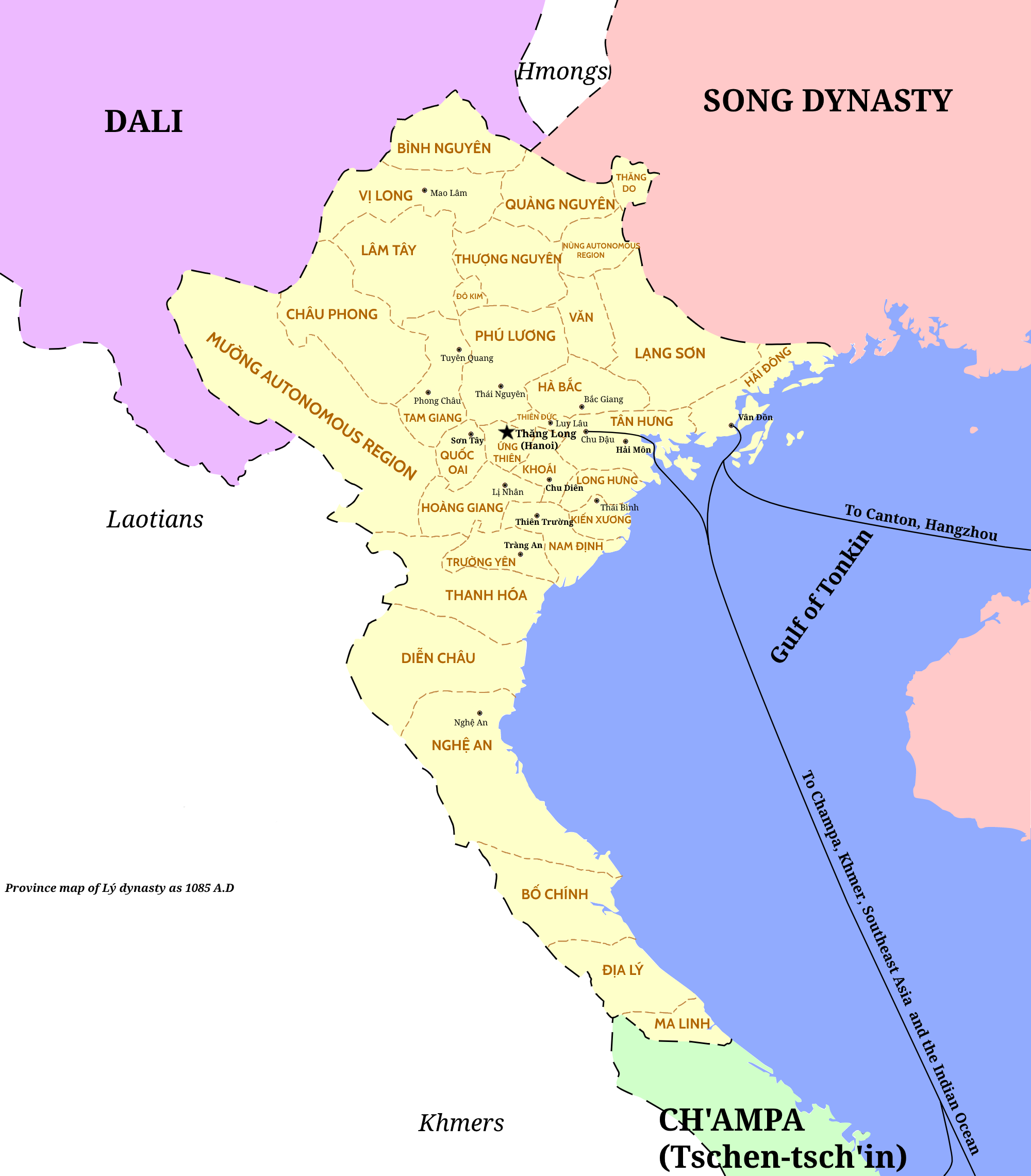
Đại Việt under the Lý dynasty in 1085

This is a timeline of the Lý dynasty, which ruled Đại Cồ Việt (1009–1054), and then the renamed Đại Việt (1054–1226).

== 11th century ==
Year	Date	Event
1009		Lê Long Đĩnh dies from hemorrhoids; military leader Lý Công Uẩn replaces the house of Lê and establishes the House of Lý ruling over Đại Cồ Việt
1010		Lý Công Uẩn moves the capital from Hoa Lư to Đại La, which is renamed Thang Long
1011		Lý Công Uẩn raises an army and attacks rebels in present day Thanh Hóa
1013		Lý Công Uẩn publishes a document on taxing ponds, fields, and mulberry trees
1013		Soldiers are sent into the northern mountains to combat the influence of the Dali Kingdom
1016		Lý Công Uẩn places local cults under court patronage; a three year break on land rent is declared after a good harvest
1020		Lý Phật Mã follows a general into battle against the Chams, defeating them
1024		A temple is built for Lý Công Uẩn to use for studying Buddhist scriptures, after which he withdraws from public affairs
1025		Lý Công Uẩn's mentor, Vạn Hạnh, dies
1028		Lý Công Uẩn dies and is succeeded by his eldest son, Lý Thái Tông (Lý Phật Mã), who defeats an assault on him by his three brothers Duke of Đông Chinh(Đông Chinh vương), Duke of Dực Thánh(Dực Thánh vương) and Duke of Vũ Đức(Vũ Đức vương)
1039		Lý Thái Tông attacks Nùng Tồn Phúc, a leader of the Tai-speaking Nùng people who declared independence from Đại Cồ Việt on the border of the Song dynasty
1041		Nùng Tồn Phúc's son Nùng Trí Cao tries to rebel but is captured and spared by Lý Thái Tông
1044		Đại Cồ Việt invades Champa and kills its king, Jaya Sinhavarman II near present day Da Nang
1048		Nùng Trí Cao rebels in Cao Bằng Province
1051		Nùng Trí Cao is driven out of Cao Bằng Province and into Song dynasty territory where he is killed two years later
1054		Lý Thái Tông hands over government to his son, Lý Thánh Tông (Lý Nhật Tôn), and dies a few weeks later; Đại Cồ Việt is renamed Đại Việt
1055		Local Song dynasty officials led by Xiao Zhu secretly train military units and shelter refugees from Đại Việt
1059		Đại Việt raids the Song dynasty border in present day Qinzhou
1063		Lý Thánh Tông travels to Luy Lâu, where he finds the concubine, Ỷ Lan, who would provide him his first male heir
1069		Đại Việt invades Champa and captures King Rudravarman III, who is released in exchange for what is now Quảng Bình Province
1072		Lý Thánh Tông dies and his son, Lý Nhân Tông (Lý Càn Đức), succeeds the throne; his mother Ỷ Lan becomes regent with the help of her son and co-rule Đại Việt with chancellor Lý Đạo Thành
1072		Imperial examinations are established in Đại Việt
1075		Lý–Song War: Lý Thường Kiệt and Nùng Tông Đán of the Lý dynasty that ruled Đại Việt invade the Song dynasty, capturing Qinzhou, Lianzhou, and destroying Yongzhou before retreating
1076	autumn	Lý–Song War: Guo Kui of the Song dynasty invades Đại Việt (Lý dynasty) and pushes to the Cầu River, where the war reaches a stalemate
1077		Lý–Song War: Đại Việt (Lý dynasty) becomes a Song tributary in return for the withdraw of Song troops
1079		Lý–Song War: Song dynasty gives up claims to Cao Bằng and Lạng Sơn in return for Song captives
1085		Lý Nhân Tông reaches the age of 19 and announces a new reign title; Lê Văn Thịnh is appointed chancellor
1088		Song and the Lý of Đại Việt finalize their border agreement, which with minor changes throughout the centuries, is basically the same as the modern China–Vietnam border
1096		Lê Văn Thịnh is found guilty of attempting to murder Lý Nhân Tông and banished to the mountains

== 12th century ==
Year	Date	Event
1103		Lý Thường Kiệt defeats a rebellion by Ly Giac, who flees to Champa and enlists the aid of Jaya Indravarman II to seize border districts and raid Đại Việt
1104		Lý Thường Kiệt defeats Champa's forces several time before dying in the following year
1119		Lý Nhân Tông personally leads the army in quelling mountain bandits
1125		The eunuch general, Le Ba Ngoc, defeats Nung rebels in Cao Bằng Province
1128		Lý Nhân Tông dies and is succeeded by his grandson, Lý Thần Tông (Lý Dương Hoán)
1128		Khmer Empire and Champa attack Đại Việt
1133		Khmer Empire and Champa attack Đại Việt
1135		Khmer Empire and Champa attack Đại Việt
1137		Khmer Empire and Champa attack Đại Việt
1138		Lý Thần Tông dies and is succeeded by his two-year-old son, Lý Anh Tông (Lý Thiên Tộ); Đỗ Anh Vũ becomes regent
1139		Thân Lợi, a supposed son of Lý Nhân Tông, rises in rebellion in Thái Nguyên Province but is defeated and executed
1141		Four laws are proclaimed specifying the differences between a mortgage and a bill of sale
1144		A Chinese adventurer crosses over into Đại Việt claiming to be a governor of Annam is defeated and captured by Song border guards
1144		A law is published specifying punishments for those who rely upon family connections in dispute over real estate
1145		An edict restricting recruitment of the palace guard to powerful families is passed
1149		Đỗ Anh Vũ is temporarily exiled before his guards kill the conspirators
1149		Trade connections with Java and the Khmer Empire are established
1159		An envoy returning from the Song dynasty convinces Lý Anh Tông to copy the Song practice of allowing anonymous suggestions in a suggestion box, but the envoy is exiled and forced to commit suicide due to a message saying that Đỗ Anh Vũ is conspiring to kill Lý Anh Tôn; Đỗ Anh Vũ dies a few months later and his position is passed to Tô Hiến Thành
1175		Lý Anh Tông dies and is succeeded by his sixth son Lý Cao Tông (Lý Long Trát)
1179		Tô Hiến Thành dies
1181		A famine kills half the population
1190		Đàm Dĩ Mông becomes the leading figure at court
1198		Đàm Dĩ Mông starts a purge of Buddhist monks
1198		A rebellion in Nghệ An Province is put down
1199		Floods and famine spread over the land

== 13th century ==
Year	Date	Event
1200		The court distributes food to alleviate starvation
1202		An overseer of monks describes the kingdom as in distress and collapsing
1203		Lý Cao Tông starts the construction of ten palaces
1203		A prince of Champa, Vidyanandana, raids Nghệ An Province
1203		A rebellion breaks out in Hoa Lư
1207		Two more rebellions break out, one based in Sơn Tây, and one in Hải Dương
1208		Phạm Bỉnh Di attacks the allies of Phạm Du
1209		Phạm Du takes Lý Cao Tông and flees to take refuge with Trần Lý
1210		Lý Huệ Tông (Lý Sảm) is enthroned by Đàm Dĩ Mông and marries Trần Lý's daughter; Phạm Du is killed by Trần Lý; Trần Lý is killed by bandits; Lý Cao Tông dies of sickness
1212		Lý Huệ Tông considers retiring to a monastery due to court infighting
1213		Royal army attacks Trần Tự Khánh, the son of Trần Lý, but is defeated
1214		Trần Tự Khánh attacks Thăng Long, causing Lý Huệ Tông to flee to Lạng Sơn under the protection of Nguyễn Nộn
1216		Lý Huệ Tông defects to Trần Tự Khánh to avoid his mother's homicidal tendencies
1223		Trần Tự Khánh dies and is succeeded by his brother Trần Thủ Độ
1224		Trần Thủ Độ forces Lý Huệ Tông to abdicate for his daughter Lý Chiêu Hoàng
1225		Lý Chiêu Hoàng marries Trần Thái Tông with him as king, ending the Lý dynasty

== Bibliography ==
- Juzheng, Xue (1995), Old History of the Five Dynasties, Zhonghua Book Company, ISBN 7101003214
- Crespigny, Rafe (2007), A Biographical Dictionary of Later Han to the Three Kingdoms (23-220 AD), Brill
- Taylor, Jay (1983), The Birth of the Vietnamese, University of California Press
- Taylor, K.W. (2013), A History of the Vietnamese, Cambridge University Press
- Twitchett, Denis C. (1979), The Cambridge History of China, Vol. 3, Sui and T'ang China, 589–906, Cambridge University Press
- Twitchett, Denis (1994), "The Liao", The Cambridge History of China, Volume 6, Alien Regime and Border States, 907-1368, Cambridge: Cambridge University Press, pp. 43–153, ISBN 0521243319
- Twitchett, Denis (2009), The Cambridge History of China Volume 5 The Sung dynasty and its Predecessors, 907-1279, Cambridge University Press*Walker, Hugh Dyson (2012), East Asia: A New History, AuthorHouse
- Xiong, Victor Cunrui (2009), Historical Dictionary of Medieval China, United States of America: Scarecrow Press, Inc., ISBN 978-0810860537
