= List of early inscriptions in Vietnam =

The list of early inscriptions in northern Vietnam comprises a list of the corpus of known inscriptions written in Chinese language and Vietnamese language mostly using chữ Hán and few using chữ Nôm from c. 300s to 1230s found in northern Vietnam.

== Chinese period (c. 0–900 AD) ==
Inscription	Date	Place of discovery	Year of discovery	Description
Unattested	314/450 (Jin or Liu Song dynasty)	Thanh Hoài, Thanh Khương, Thuận Thành; Bắc Ninh; 21.050°N 106.083°E	2013	Two inscriptions in Chinese Seal script. Was damaged in 1967 by bombs during the US bombing campaign.
Inscription of the Temple of Precious Peace of Jiuzhen Commandery of the Great Sui (大隋九真 郡寶安道場之碑文)	618 (Sui dynasty)	Đông Sơn District; Thanh Hóa; 19°48′27″N 105°46′35″E	1960	Inscription in Chinese praises a Sui Chinese officer "Governor Li" (Lê in Vietnamese) in his struggle against Tang dynasty. It comprises 957 Chinese characters, 246 eroded.
Inscription on Thanh Mai Bell	798 (Tang dynasty)	Thanh Mai village, Thanh Oai District; Hanoi; 20.853715°N 105.768395°E	1986	Inscription in Chinese describes a local Sino-Vietnamese Buddhist association and its 243 members: 135 women and 108 men. It also shows the high status of local women of Annam in religious life.

== Postclassic – Early Đại Việt period (900–1230) ==
Inscription	Date	Place of discovery	Year of discovery	Description
Inscription on Nhật Tảo bell	948 (Southern Han/Jinghai Principality)	Nhật Tảo village, Bắc Từ Liêm District; Hanoi; 21°3′15″N 105°40′56″E	1987	Inscription in Chinese retells how artefacts were used for the cultic ritual of a local religious sect. Claudine Salmon suggested that there were certain cultural exchanges between the Ngo family who ruled the Red River Delta and the Southern Han state.
16 pray columns inscribe Buddhist Uṣṇīṣa Vijaya Dhāraṇī Sūtra	973–979	Hoa Lư, Ninh Bình Province; 20°17′10″N 105°54′24″E	1965–1987	The Sutra was transcribed phonetically direct into inscriptions in Chinese. Erected by Prince Đinh Liễn (?–979), he wanted to say a mass for bhadanta Đính Noa Tăng Noa Đinh Hạng Lang who he has killed for the Crown Prince position. These inscriptions marked Tantric influences on Vietnamese Buddhism.
Inscription of the Nhất Trụ temple	995	Hoa Lư, Ninh Bình Province; 20°17′10″N 105°54′24″E		A 3-meter pray column in a octagonal cylinder shape with inscription in Chinese. Erected by king Lê Đại Hành, the inscription cites verses from the Śūraṅgama Sūtra.
Minh Tịnh tự bi văn 明凈寺碑文	1090	Tế Độ village, Hoằng Phúc, Hoằng Hóa District, Thanh Hóa Province; 19.850°N 105.850°E	2000	Buddhist inscription in Chinese.
A Di đà Phật tụng 阿彌陀佛頌	1099	Hoàng Ngô village, Quốc Oai District, Hanoi; 20.991629°N 105.642635°E		Buddhist inscription in Chinese lies underneath a Bodhisattva statue in Hoàng Kim Pagoda, commemorating the new Amitābha statue of Tri Bat (1049–1117), a master of Dhyāna school in Vietnam. Tri Bat was much influenced by Tantric and Pure Land Buddhism.
An Hoạch sơn Báo Ân tự bi ký 安穫山報恩寺碑記	c. 1100	Báo Ân Temple, Mount Nhồi, Thanh Hóa, Thanh Hóa Province; 19°48′27″N 105°46′35″E		Chinese inscription on a stele in Báo n temple dated around 1100, commemorating Lý Thường Kiệt as the Lord of Thanh Hóa.
Bảo Ninh Sùng Phúc tự bi 保寧崇福寺碑	c. 1107	Bảo Ninh Sùng Phúc Temple, Chiêm Hóa District, Tuyên Quang Province; 22.250°N 105.167°E		Inscription in Chinese commemorating the contribution of the local Hà clan for the royal Lý family and to king Nhân Tông.
Sùng Nghiêm Diên Thánh tự bi minh 崇嚴延聖寺碑銘	1118	Sùng Nghiêm Diên Thánh Temple, Thọ Hạc, Hậu Lộc District, Thanh Hóa Province; 19.933°N 105.900°E		Inscription in Chinese noted statues of Gautama Buddha, Kaśyapa, and Metteyya.
Royal inscription Đại Việt quốc Lý gia đệ tử đế Sùng Thiện Diên Linh tháp 大越國 李家弟四帝崇善延靈塔碑	1121	Đọi Temple, Duy Tiên, Hà Nam Province; 20.617°N 105.950°E		Inscription in Chinese and Vietnamese (phonetic-phonetic Chu Nom) verses describe Lý Nhân Tông's expression about his construction of Đọi Temple after his mother Queen Y Lan's death in 1117. The authors of the inscription linked their location to the origins of Buddhism, declared "In India was manifested the divine."
Ngưỡng Sơn Linh Xứng tự bi minh 仰山靈稱寺碑銘	1126	Hà Trung District, Thanh Hóa Province; 20.033°N 105.833°E		Inscription in Chinese commemorating the construction of Ngưỡng Sơn Linh Xứng Temple by Lý Thường Kiệt. It also stated that there were prayers from Champa and Cambodia came to the temple.
Cổ Việt thôn Diên Phúc tự bi minh 古越村延福寺碑銘	1157	Diên Phúc Temple, Tân Việt, Yên Mỹ District, Hưng Yên Province; 20.8674°N 106.021°E		Buddhist inscription in Chinese.
Cự Việt quốc Thái úy Lý công thạch bi tịnh tự 鉅越國太尉李公石碑銘序	1159	Trưng Trắc, Văn Lâm District, Hưng Yên Province; 20.59°N 106.02°E	1920	Inscription in Chinese commemorating Đỗ Anh Vũ, a high official of the royal court.
Hoàng Việt Thái phó Lưu quân mộ chí 皇越太傅劉君墓誌	1161	Hưng Hà District, Thái Bình Province		Inscription in Chinese, now is lost
Đại Chu Ma sơn áng Đại Quang Thánh nham bi 大朱摩山盎大光聖岩碑	1166	Am Tiên Cave, Hoa Lư, Ninh Bình Province; 20°17′10″N 105°54′24″E		Buddhist inscription in Chinese.
Phụng Thánh phu nhân Lê thị chi mộ chí 奉聖夫人黎氏之墓誌	1174	Diên Linh Phúc Thánh Temple, Hương Nộn, Tam Dương District, Vĩnh Phúc Province; 21°22′59″N 105°32′28″E		Funeral inscription of Queen Lan Xuân, mother of king Lý Anh Tông in Chinese and contains some phonetic-phonetic Vietnamese characters.
Cự Việt An Thái tự bi 鉅越安泰寺碑	Lý Anh Tông period (1138–1175)	Quỳnh Lưu District, Nghệ An Province; 19.167°N 105.667°E		
Bảo Chưởng Thái bà mộ chí 寶掌太婆墓誌	1207	Hòa Chúng, Nghi Sơn, Thanh Hóa Province; 19.417°N 105.750°E		Funeral inscription in Chu Han.
Báo Ân thiền tự bi ký 報恩禪寺碑記	1210	Báo Ân Temple, Mê Linh District, Hanoi; 21.184598°N 105.719097°E		Sino–Vietnamese (Han–Nom) inscription, listed names of people, villages and hamlets in Vietnamese script (chu Nom).
Chúc Thánh Báo Ân tự bi 祝聖報恩寺碑	c. 1185–1214	Thanh Xá, Nghĩa Hiệp, Yên Mỹ District, Hưng Yên Province; 20.8674°N 106.021°E		Inscription in Chinese (Han) and Vietnamese (Semantic-Semantic Nom).
Inscription in Phong Phú Cave	1222	Ninh Giang, Hoa Lư, Ninh Bình Province; 20°17′10″N 105°54′24″E		

== Footnotes ==
=== References ===
- Ha, Van Tan (2018). Inscriptions from Tenth to Fourteenth Centuries recently discovered in Vietnam. Cornell University Press. ISBN 978-1-50171-899-1.
- Kiernan, Ben (2019). Việt Nam: a history from earliest time to the present. Oxford University Press.
- Miksic, John Norman (2016). Ancient Southeast Asia. Routledge.
- Nguyen, Tai Thu (2008). The History of Buddhism in Vietnam. Council for Research in Values and Philosophy.
- Pham, T. T. V. (2013). "Inscriptions during Ly period". TẠP CHÍ HÁN NÔM số 6 (in Vietnamese). 121.
- Salmon, Claudine (2004), "Tang-Viet society as reflected in a Buddhist bell inscription", in Shing, Müller; Höllmann, Thomas O. (eds.), Archäologie und Frühe Texte, Germany: Harrassowitz, pp. 195–216, ISBN 978-3-447-05060-9
- ——— (2007), "Transnational networks as reflected in epigraphy: the case of Chinese Buddhist bells in southeast Asia", in Colin, Storey; Tan, Chee Beng (eds.), Chinese overseas : migration, research and documentation, Chinese University Press, pp. 23–84, ISBN 978-9-62996-328-6
- Taylor, K. W. (2018). Tales from stone and paper about Do Anh Vu (1114–1159). Cornell University Press. ISBN 978-1-50171-899-1.
- Tran, T. G. H. (2008), BƯỚC ĐẦU TÌM HIỂU CHỮ NÔM TRONG CÁC BẢN VĂN KHẮC THỜI LÝ TRẦN (in Vietnamese)
- Whitmore, John K. (2015), "Building a Buddhist monarchy in Dai Viet: Temples and texts under Ly Nhan Tong (1072-1127)", in Lammerts, Dietrich Christian (ed.), Buddhist Dynamics in Premodern and Early Modern Southeast Asia, ISEAS Publishing, Institute of Southeast Asian Studies, pp. 283–306, ISBN 978-9-814-51906-9
