= Đỗ Anh Vũ =

Chancellor of the Lý dynasty
- Monarch: Lý Anh Tông

Personal details
- Born: 1113
- Died: 1158 (aged 45)

Đỗ Anh Vũ (chữ Hán: 杜英武) (1113–1158) was an official in the royal court of Lý Anh Tông, the sixth emperor of the Lý dynasty. Considered the most prominent figure of the consort clan during the Early Lý period, Đỗ Anh Vũ held the most powerful position in the royal court from 1140 to his death in 1158 except a short period in which Đỗ Anh Vũ was toppled by a group of officials led by the military commander Vũ Đái. According to dynastic historians such as Ngô Sĩ Liên and Lê Văn Hưu, Đỗ Anh Vũ was a skilled but arrogant official who profited his position, that came from his intimate relation with the Empress Mother Lê thị, to purge other opponents in the royal court by ruthless method. However, the discovery in the late 1930s of a stele engraved the description about the life of Đỗ Anh Vũ provided an alternative perspective about the official in which Đỗ Anh Vũ was highly praised for his noble character and devotion for the stability of the Lý dynasty.

== History ==
According to Từ điển bách khoa toàn thư Việt Nam, Đỗ Anh Vũ was born in 1113 in Hồng Châu (now Hải Dương), he had an elder sister Đỗ thị, who was the natural mother of the Emperor Lý Thần Tông, and a niece who married the Emperor Lý Anh Tông. Being an intelligent and good-looking boy, Đỗ Anh Vũ was selected to serve in the imperial palace at the age of twelve.

After the coronation of Lý Anh Tông in 1138, since Đỗ Anh Vũ was younger brother of the new Empress Mother Đỗ thị, he was promoted to the position of secretary of the imperial palace (Vietnamese: Cung điện lệnh chi nội ngoại sư) in 1140. One year after the appointment, Đỗ Anh Vũ began to prove his ability during the rebellion of the priest Thân Lợi. In 1140, Thân Lợi called himself the son of Lý Nhân Tông and raised a revolt against Lý Anh Tông in the northern region (now Thái Nguyên). The army of Thân Lợi successfully dominated the frontier region and defeated the army of the royal court led by the high-ranking official Lưu Vũ Nhĩ. After the victory, Thân Lợi, now self-appointed as King Bình (Bình Vương), took a further step by directly attacking the capital Thăng Long. It was Đỗ Anh Vũ who assumed the task of stopping the military campaign of Thân Lợi, a mission that he accomplished in the fifth month of 1141 after the major battle in Quảng Dịch in which Thân Lợi's army was heavily defeated by the forces of the Lý dynasty led by Đỗ Anh Vũ. Five months later, Đỗ Anh Vũ continued to conduct the campaign of wiping out the remaining force of Thân Lợi which resulted in the total stability in the northern region, Thân Lợi himself was captured by Tô Hiến Thành and beheaded by the order of Lý Anh Tông.

During the regency of the Empress Mother Lê thị when the young emperor only ruled in name, Đỗ Anh Vũ was the favorite official of the Empress Mother and thus became the most powerful figure in the royal court who held both military and civil matters of the country. In 1147 he went to a mission of inspecting the system of mandarins and domestic records in Phú Lương. According to the Đại Việt sử ký toàn thư, Đỗ Anh Vũ sent his wife to act as servant of the Empress Mother and profited his wife's position to secretly establish an intimate relation with the Empress Mother, as a result he got the favouritism of the Empress Mother Lê thị. Holding the most important position in the royal court, Đỗ Anh Vũ became arrogant and despised other officials, hence they began to form a group to topple Đỗ Anh Vũ from power. The conspirators were several prominent figures in the royal court such as military commanders Vũ Đái, Lương Thượng Cá, Đồng Lợi, mandarins Đỗ Ất, Dương Tự Minh and members of the royal family Prince Trí Minh, Marquis Bảo Ninh. The careful plan of Vũ Đái's group was partly successful when Đỗ Anh Vũ was imprisoned by the soldiers loyal to the group. But with the support of the Empress Mother, Đỗ Anh Vũ was able to bribe some members of the group, therefore he was only tried by the emperor instead of being immediately killed as the initial plan. Following the order of Lý Anh Tông, Đỗ Anh Vũ was deprived of all titles and demoted to farmer for the dynasty (cảo điền nhi). Again with the backing of the Empress Mother Lê thị, Đỗ Anh Vũ was pardoned several times and rapidly restored his position in the royal court and finally took the position of Chancellor Regent (Thái úy phụ chính) with even more power than before.

Afraid of another conspiracy, Đỗ Anh Vũ decided to form his own military unit called Phụng quốc vệ (Guard of the Country) with more than 100 soldiers who were always ready to carry out any mission that Đỗ Anh Vũ ordered. To get an official reason for his revenge against the group of Vũ Đái, Đỗ Anh Vũ made the young emperor believe that the toppling plan of Vũ Đái was a lèse majesté action and thus got the order from Lý Anh Tông to punish Vũ Đái and his accomplices. As a result, except for the two members of the royal family who were only downgraded, all conspirators of the plan of overthrowing Đỗ Anh Vũ were captured and subsequently killed by the Phụng quốc vệ after the order of Đỗ Anh Vũ. After the purge, Đỗ Anh Vũ continued to tighten the security measure in the imperial palace and capital Thăng Long such as forbidding mandarins and members of royal family meeting in group of more than five persons to discuss or scorn, banning arms from the palace with the only exception for his Phụng quốc vệ, and prohibiting eunuchs from entering the palace. Nguyễn Quốc, an ambassador of the Lý dynasty after his voyage to the Song dynasty, was also forced to commit suicide by Đỗ Anh Vũ after the advice of Nguyễn Quốc for the emperor about a system of public report adapted from the Song dynasty. Those events were detailed in the Đại Việt sử ký toàn thư in which the role of Đỗ Anh Vũ was heavily criticized by the historians Lê Văn Hưu and Ngô Sĩ Liên, for example Ngô Sĩ Liên considered Đỗ Anh Vũ "the utterly ruthless" ("kẻ đại ác") while Lê Văn Hưu denounced his actions "nothing more heinous crime" ("không tội gì to bằng").

Outside the royal court, Đỗ Anh Vũ still supervised the most important matters of the country. In the second month of 1154 he succeeded in pacifying the revolt of the mountainous people in Chàng Long. He died in the eighth month of 1158. Trần Trọng Kim in his Việt Nam sử lược remarked that Đỗ Anh Vũ did not take any further step in the royal court only because of the appearance of some skilled officials such as Tô Hiến Thành, Hoàng Nghĩa Hiền or Lý Công Tín.

== Modern view ==
In the late 1930s, the researcher Hoàng Xuân Hãn discovered the description of a stele formerly believed about the life of Lý Thường Kiệt. After carefully analysing its content, Hoàng Xuân Hãn affirmed that the stele was in fact about the life of Đỗ Anh Vũ, who held the same position chancellor (thái úy) as Lý Thường Kiệt, he was also convinced that the stele was engraved right after the death of Đỗ Anh Vũ and thus held the invaluable information about the life of Đỗ Anh Vũ. Contrary to the harsh criticisms from dynastic historians like Lê Văn Hưu or Ngô Sĩ Liên, the stele praised Đỗ Anh Vũ as a devoted official with noble character of the Lý dynasty, who could be compared with the legendary Yi Yin and the Duke of Zhou in History of China. From the stele, the background of Đỗ Anh Vũ was also made clearer, such as his father's name was Đỗ Tướng, the sister's son of Lý Thường Kiệt, while his mother, though unnamed, was highly extolled and his adoptive father was Lê Bá Ngọc, a prominent official in the royal court of Lý Thần Tông. Entered the imperial palace at a very young age, Đỗ Anh Vũ quickly became dedicated servant and close friend of the Emperor Lý Thần Tông, who was three year younger than Đỗ Anh Vũ and had strong confidence in the official. The activities of Đỗ Anh Vũ was also described much more detailed and with more positive tone than the record about the chancellor in the Đại Việt sử ký toàn thư.

According to John K. Whitmore of the Cornell University, Lê Văn Hưu and Ngô Sĩ Liên harshly criticized Đỗ Anh Vũ because firstly they evaluated the events in the point of view of outsiders while Đỗ Anh Vũ acted as an insider of the royal court, and secondly these historians only analysed the accounts written by the outsiders of the imperial palace when Đỗ Anh Vũ was active inside, which meant the story might be distorted from the fact. Moreover, Lê Văn Hưu and Ngô Sĩ Liên belonged to another dynasties, hence they could hardly praise the achievements of a different dynasty with its officials like the Lý dynasty with its Đỗ Anh Vũ.
