= Iran–Vietnam relations =

- Iran: Vietnam

Iran–Vietnam relations refer to the bilateral relations between Iran and Vietnam, which were formally established in 1973. Iran has an embassy in Hanoi while Vietnam maintains an embassy in Tehran.

== History ==
=== Medieval relations ===
Persian traders had settled their trades in Vietnam since the early centuries CE and there had been a number of economic relations at that time. Kang Senghui (active 248–280 CE) was a Buddhist monk of Iranic Sogdian and Vietnamese parentage, and an important figure in the translation of Buddhist scriptures in the Wu kingdom. Kang is known as Khương Tăng Hội in Vietnamese Buddhism and Thông Biện (1096) claims scriptural traditions from Kang influenced Vietnamese Buddhism, though there is no independent evidence for this tradition.

Alexandre de Rhodes, who designed the modern Latin Vietnamese alphabet, died in Isfahan, Iran. Since his death, his grave has been a pilgrimate for many Vietnamese who regarded him as the founding father of modern Vietnamese alphabet and protector of Vietnamese heritage. His grave was later erected in both French, Vietnamese, English and Persian as a dedication.

In early 1950, Iran was one of 35 countries that recognized Vietnam.

=== Pre-Revolution ===
Relations of both Iran and North Vietnam did not really exist due to the Vietnam War. Iran was a pro-Western country while Vietnam was divided between Communist North and Capitalist South.

=== Post-Revolution and Present Day ===
After the 1979 Iranian Islamic Revolution, when Iran transitioned to an Islamic Republic system, relations between the two countries began to be built on the principles of independence, self-reliance, and opposition to hegemonic influence from external powers. Vietnam was one of the few countries that maintained a positive and goodwill-oriented stance toward the government of the Islamic Republic of Iran following the 1979 revolution.

To date, three Iranian presidents paid official visits to Vietnam: President Akbar Hashemi Rafsanjani in 1995, President Mahmoud Ahmadinejad in 2012, and President Hassan Rouhani in 2016. During President Rouhani’s visit, the two sides agreed to set a target of raising bilateral trade turnover to US$2 billion in the near future. At the same time, the two countries committed to expanding cooperation in potential sectors such as energy (including oil, gas, and petrochemicals), agriculture and fisheries, medical technology and pharmaceuticals, as well as education and training.

In addition, Vietnam and Iran regularly coordinate with and support each other at international forums such as the United Nations and the Non-Aligned Movement, demonstrating a shared viewpoint in promoting South–South cooperation and upholding the principle of respect for national sovereignty.

== Diplomatic representatives ==
=== Vietnamese ambassadors to Iran ===
South Vietnam ambassadors to the Imperial State of Iran

1. Lâm Lễ Trinh (1963, resident in Ankara)
2. Đinh Văn Kiểu (1967–1970, resident in Ankara)
3. Đặng Ngọc Trân (1970–1973, Chargé d'affaires, resident in Ankara)
4. Nghiêm Mỹ (1973–1974, Chargé d'affaires, resident in Tehran)
5. Lương Nhị Kỳ (1974–1975, the first resident Ambassador, until the Fall of Saigon)

== Resident diplomatic missions ==
- Iran has an embassy in Hanoi.
- Vietnam has an embassy in Tehran.

== See also ==
- Foreign relations of Iran
- Foreign relations of Vietnam
