= Nhân Tông =

- Vietnamese alphabet: Nhân Tông
- Chữ Hán: 仁宗
- Literal meaning: Benevolent Ancestor

Nhân Tông is the temple name used for several emperors of Vietnam, derived from the Chinese equivalent Rénzōng. It may refer to:

- Lý Nhân Tông (1066–1127, reigned 1072–1127), emperor of the Lý dynasty
- Trần Nhân Tông (1258–1308, reigned 1278–1293), emperor of the Trần dynasty
- Lê Nhân Tông (1441–1459, reigned 1453–1459), emperor of the Lê dynasty

== See also ==
- Renzong (disambiguation), Chinese equivalent
- Injong (disambiguation), Korean equivalent
