= Empress Dương =

Empress Dương may refer to:

- Dương Vân Nga (died 1000), empress dowager of the Đinh Dynasty and empress consort of the Early Lê dynasty
- Empress Mother Thượng Dương (died 1073), Lý Thánh Tông's empress
- Dương Thị Thục (1868–1944), empress dowager of the Nguyễn dynasty
