= Tô Hiến Thành =

Vietnamese court official

Chancellor of the Lý dynasty
- Monarchs: Lý Anh Tông; Lý Cao Tông

Personal details
- Born: November 1, 1101 Hạ Mỗ, Đại Việt
- Died: September 23, 1179 (aged 77) Thăng Long, Đại Việt

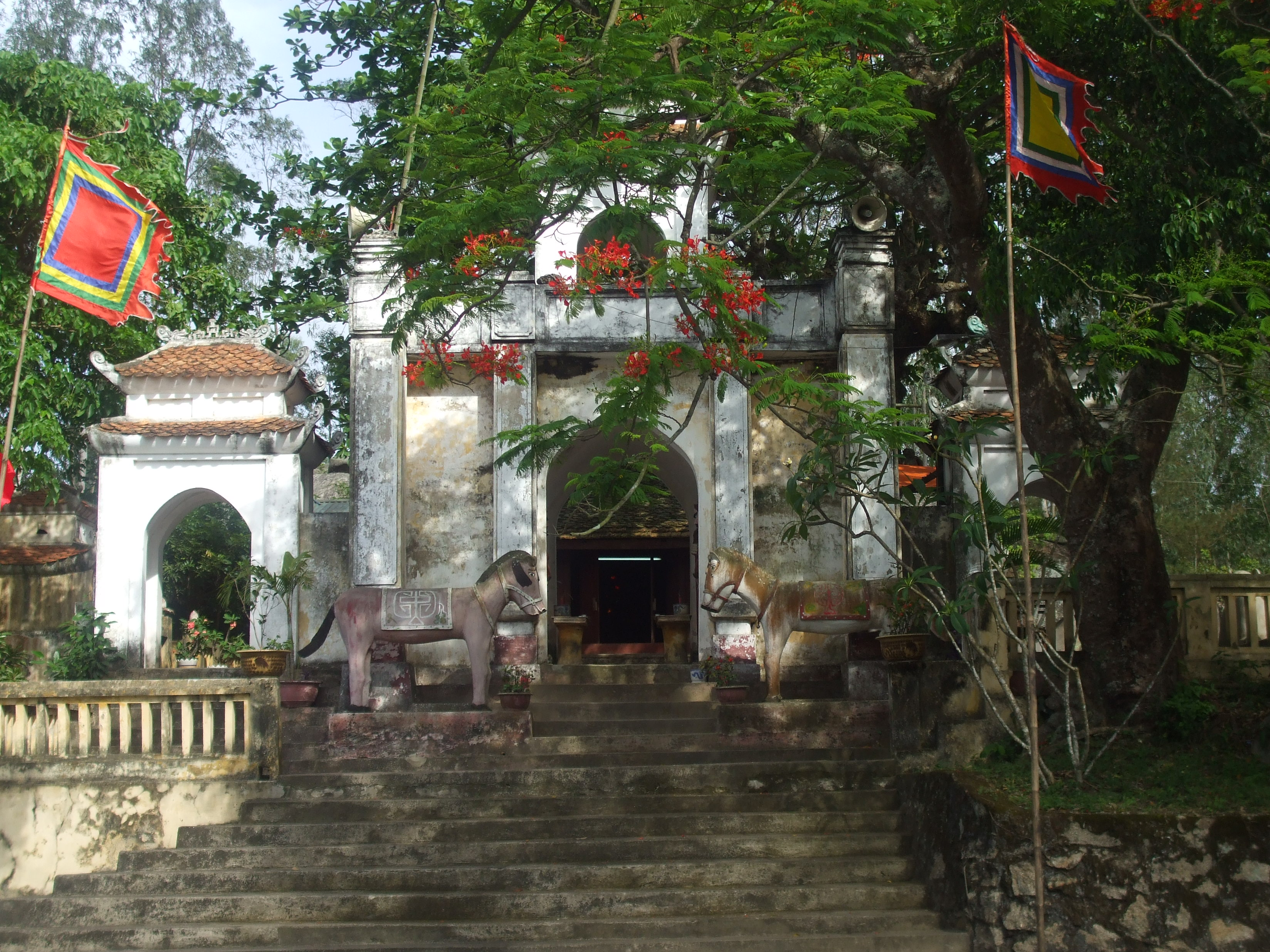
The gate to Tô Hiến Thành temple

Tô Hiến Thành (chữ Hán: 蘇憲誠) (November 01, 1101-September 23, 1179) was an official in the royal court of Lý Anh Tông and Lý Cao Tông, the sixth and seventh emperors of the Lý dynasty. Being a capable official of Lý Anh Tông who helped the emperor in civil and military matters, Tô Hiến Thành was chosen by Lý Anh Tông for the regentship of his son Lý Long Trát. He was granted the title Prince and thus became the only possessor of the title who did not come from the Lý royal family. The achievements and loyalty of Tô Hiến Thành to the infant emperor Lý Cao Tông made him a highly praised figure in the history of Vietnam. Today, Tô Hiến Thành is considered one of the most prominent mandarins in the dynastic time of Vietnam.

== History ==
=== During Lý Anh Tông's reign ===
According to Từ điển bách khoa toàn thư Việt Nam, the birth date of Tô Hiến Thành was on November 01, 1101; he was born in the Hạ Mỗ village (now Đan Phượng, Hanoi). Since his family name was Tô, there was a hypothesis that he might have a kinship with Tô thị, the wife of Đỗ Anh Vũ who was the most powerful figure in the royal court during the early reign of Lý Anh Tông.

Tô Hiến Thành was mentioned for the first time in historical account for his role in pacifying the rebellion of Thân Lợi. In 1140, Thân Lợi called himself the son of Lý Nhân Tông and raised a revolt against Lý Anh Tông in the northern region (now Thái Nguyên). Thân Lợi's army was finally suppressed by Lý troops led by Đỗ Anh Vũ while Thân Lợi was captured by Tô Hiến Thành and beheaded by the order of Lý Anh Tông in the tenth month of 1141. It was Tô Hiến Thành who advised the emperor to grant amnesty for members of the rebellion to demonstrate the kindness of the dynasty to its people.

During the early rule of Lý Anh Tông, the most powerful official was Đỗ Anh Vũ who decided military and civil matters of Đại Việt, but Tô Hiến Thành, as a court minister, began to prove his ability in the royal court. The historian Trần Trọng Kim remarked that Đỗ Anh Vũ did not take any further step in taking power only because of the appearance of such skilled officials like Tô Hiến Thành, Hoàng Nghĩa Hiền or Lý Công Tín.

After the death of Đỗ Anh Vũ, in 1158, Tô Hiến Thành became the most prominent figure in the royal court who helped the emperor successfully rule the country. In the fifth month of 1159, Tô Hiến Thành put down the revolt of Ngưu Hống and Ai Lao in the western border and was promoted to the position of commander-in-chief (Thái úy) of Đại Việt army. In this position, Tô Hiến Thành conducted several measures to improve the efficiency of the army such as reorganizing, recruiting strong and young people, choosing capable commanders and stepping up the exercise in army.

In the seventh month of 1167, Lý Anh Tông appointed Tô Hiến Thành commander of the military campaign against the kingdom of Champa, a campaign which was ordered to abandon after the king of Champa, Jaya Indravarman IV, proposed a withdrawal of the Lý dynasty by offering Lý Anh Tông tribute. Originally holding a military position in the royal court, Tô Hiến Thành helped the emperor improve the efficiency of the Lý army and paid attention to the development of Confucian learning in the country. After the advice of Tô Hiến Thành, Lý Anh Tông issued the establishment the first temple of Confucius in Thăng Long in 1156. Formerly, Confucius was jointly worshiped in the Temple of Literature, Hanoi.

Self-castration was banned by Tô Hiến Thành

=== During Lý Cao Tông's reign ===
In 1175, the emperor was seriously ill and decided to entrust the regentship of his son Lý Long Trát to Tô Hiến Thành. The regent was appointed to the position of chancellor of the Lý dynasty (Thái phó bình chương quân quốc trọng sự) and granted the title Prince (Vương) — an unprecedented act of a Lý emperor for a title that was reserved exclusively for members of the royal family. During the Lý dynasty, Tô Hiến Thành was the only possessor of the title Prince who did not come from the Lý royal family. From the fourth month of 1175, Tô Hiến Thành began his regency because the emperor was not able to rule the country as the crown prince was only two years old. The emperor died in the seventh month in 1175 and began the campaign of the Empress Mother in supporting another prince, Lý Long Xưởng, to replace the infant emperor Lý Long Trát, now Lý Cao Tông. The Empress Mother tried to bribe Tô Hiến Thành's wife and persuaded the regent many times. Tô Hiến Thành refused by a simple answer that he had to follow the order of the late emperor and preferred being honest to being rich but disloyal. His firmness in refusing the proposal of the Empress Mother and controlling the army and order during the funeral time made other officials believe in Lý Cao Tông. They therefore declined the campaign of replacing him by the prince Lý Long Xưởng.

During his regentship, Tô Hiến Thành proved to be a skilled official with deep knowledge in military and civil matters. The regent died in 1179. To mourn the death of Tô Hiến Thành, the emperor stopped attending the royal court for six days and cut down his meals for three days. According to Đại Việt sử ký toàn thư, when he was ill, Tô Hiến Thành was thoughtfully cared by the official Vũ Tán Đường while the mandarin Trần Trung Tá did not visit the regent due to busy work. Nevertheless, when the Empress Mother personally visited and asked Tô Hiến Thành in his dying moments about a successor for his position, the regent at once recommended Trần Trung Tá. Being asked by the Empress Mother why he did not mention the devoted Vũ Tán Đường, Tô Hiến Thành responded: "Because Your Highness asked for a successor of my position, I choose Trần Trung Tá, in case Your Highness need a servant, I will recommend Vũ Tán Đường."

However, after Tô Hiến Thành's death, the Empress Mother did not follow his advice and the Lý dynasty began to fall into a turbulent time and finally collapsed in 1225.

== Legacy ==
The talent and faithful character of Tô Hiến Thành was highly appreciated in the history of Vietnam. In 1394, the Retired Emperor Trần Nghệ Tông of the Trần dynasty ordered his painter to draw an illustration about four exemplary regents, in which only Tô Hiến Thành was from Đại Việt. The other three — the Duke of Zhou, Huo Guang and Zhuge Liang — all came from China. Because of his achievements and loyalty for the infant emperor, Tô Hiến Thành was often compared with Zhuge Liang who was the dedicated regent for Liu Shan.

Today, a main street in Hanoi and many places in Vietnam are named in honour of Tô Hiến Thành. Each year a traditional festival is held in Phú Xuyên in the first lunar month to commemorate his feats. In the Lý Bát Đế Shrine, the traditional temple for worshiping the emperors of the Lý dynasty, Tô Hiến Thành is one of only two civil mandarins who are jointly worshiped, along with Lý Đạo Thành.
