= Eunuchs in Vietnam =

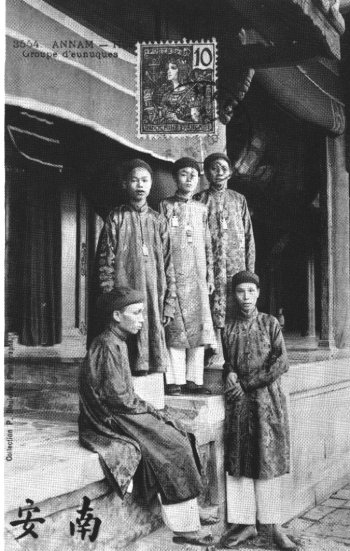
Vietnamese eunuchs in Nguyễn dynasty

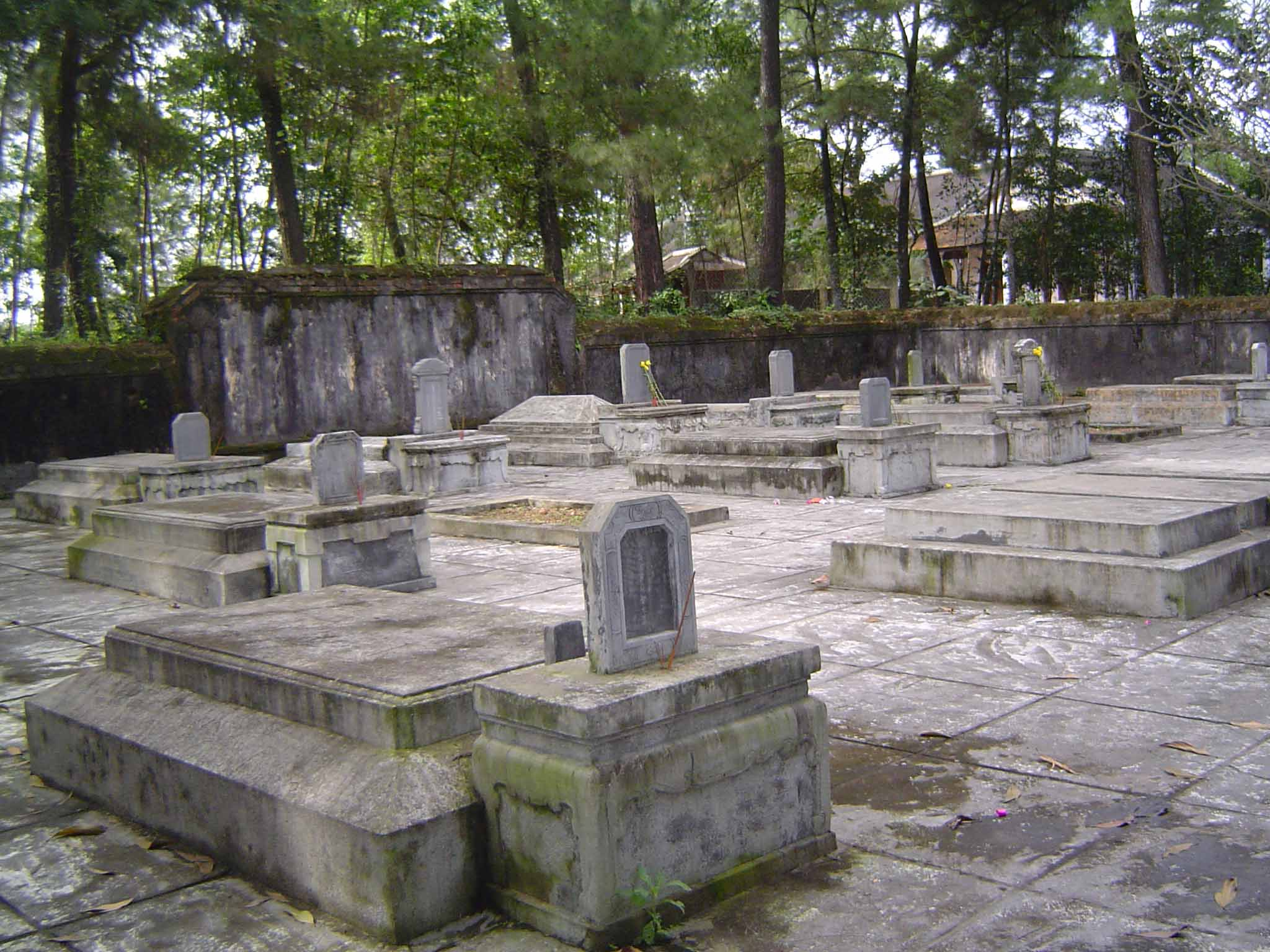
A cemetery of eunuchs at Từ Hiếu Temple, Huế

A eunuch (/ˈjuːnək/ YOO-nək) is a man who has been castrated. Throughout history, castration often served a specific social function.

Regarding eunuchs, the Vietnamese adopted the eunuch system and castration techniques from China. Records show that the Vietnamese performed castration in a painful procedure by removing the entire genitalia with both penis and testicles being cut off with a sharp knife or metal blade. The procedure was agonizing since the entire penis was cut off. The young man's thighs and abdomen would be tied and others would pin him down on a table. The genitals would be washed with pepper water and then cut off. A tube would be then inserted into the urethra to allow urination during healing. Many Vietnamese eunuchs were products of self castration in order to gain access to the palaces and power. In other cases they might be paid to become eunuchs. They served in many capacities, from supervising public works, to investigating crimes, to reading public proclamations.

== History ==
Castration was a part of the Five Punishments.

=== Lý dynasty ===
Lý Thường Kiệt was a prominent eunuch general during the Lý dynasty (1009–1225).

Self-castration was banned by Lý dynasty Vietnamese official Tô Hiến Thành The left arm of a man who self-castrated was tattooed with 23 characters and he was beaten with a heavy stick 80 times under orders of emperor Lý Anh Tông in 1162.

=== Trần dynasty ===
A boy student was given money in exchange for becoming a eunuch by Tran Canh in 1254 since many men castrated themselves to become eunuchs during the Tran and Ly dynasties.

The Trần dynasty sent Vietnamese boy eunuchs as tribute to Ming dynasty China several times, in 1383, 1384 and 1385 Nguyen Dao, Nguyen Toan, Tru Ca, and Ngo Tin were among several Vietnamese eunuchs sent to China.

=== Fourth Chinese domination of Vietnam (Ming dynasty) ===
During the Fourth Chinese domination of Vietnam, the Ming Chinese under the Yongle Emperor castrated many young Vietnamese boys, choosing them for their handsomeness and ability, and brought them to Nanjing to serve as eunuchs. Among them were the architect-engineer Nguyễn An and Nguyen Lang (阮浪). Vietnamese were among the many eunuchs of different origins found at the Yongle Emperor's court. Among the eunuchs in charge of the Capital Battalions of Beijing was Xing An, a Vietnamese.

=== Lê dynasty ===
Article 344 of the Nguyen dynasty code and Article 305 of the Le dynasty code both forbade self-castration and castration of Vietnamese men. Castration of Vietnamese men was banned by the Nguyen and Le dynasties in contrast to China's legal code. Self-castration of Vietnamese men was banned by Lê Thánh Tông, the emperor, in 1464.

In the Lê dynasty the Vietnamese Emperor Lê Thánh Tông was aggressive in his relations with foreign countries including China and cracked down on foreign contacts and enforced an isolationist policy. A large amount of trade between Guangdong (Leizhou Peninsula and Hainan) and Vietnam happened during this time. Early accounts recorded that the Vietnamese captured Chinese whose ships had blown off course and detained them. Young Chinese men were selected by the Vietnamese for castration to become eunuch slaves to the Vietnamese. It has been speculated by modern historians that Chinese who were captured and castrated by the Vietnamese were involved in regular trade between China and Vietnam instead of being blown off course, and that they were punished after a Vietnamese crackdown on trade with foreign countries.

Several Malay envoys from the Malacca sultanate were attacked and captured in 1469 by Vietnamese navy as they were returning to Malacca from China. The Vietnamese enslaved and castrated the young from among the captured.

A 1499 entry in the Ming Shilu recorded that thirteen Chinese men from Wenchang including a young man named Wu Rui were captured by the Vietnamese after their ship was blown off course while traveling from Hainan to Guangdong's Qin subprefecture (Qinzhou), after which they ended up near the coast of Vietnam, in the 1460s, during the Chenghua Emperor's rule (1464–1487). Twelve of them were enslaved to work as agricultural laborers, while the youngest Chinese man, Wu Rui (吳瑞) was selected by the Vietnamese court for castration since he was the only young man in among the thirteen and he became a eunuch at the Vietnamese imperial palace in Thang Long for nearly one fourth of a century. After years of serving the Vietnamese as a eunuch slave in the palace, he was promoted to a position with real power after the death of the Vietnamese ruler in 1497 to a military position in northern Vietnam as military superintendent since his service in the palace was apparently valued by the Vietnamese. However, the Lạng Sơn guard soldier Dương Tam tri (Yang Sanzhi) (楊三知) told him of an escape route back to China and Wu Rui escaped to Longzhou after walking for 9 days through the mountains. The local ethnic minority Tusi chief Wei Chen took him into custody, overruling objections from his family who wanted to send him back to Vietnam. Vietnam found out about his escape and sent an agent to buy Wu Rui back from Wei Chen with 100 Jin in payment since they were scared that Wu Rui would reveal Vietnamese state secrets to China. Wei Chen planned to sell him back to the Vietnamese but told them the amount they were offering was too little and demanded more however before they could agree on a price, Wu was rescued by the Pingxiang magistrate Li Guangning and then was sent to Beijing to work as a eunuch in the Ming palace at the Directorate of Ceremonial (silijian taijian 司禮監太監). The Đại Việt sử ký toàn thư records that in 1467 in An Bang province of Dai Viet (now Quảng Ninh Province) a Chinese ship blew off course onto the shore. The Chinese were detained and not allowed to return to China as ordered by Le Thanh Tong. This incident may be the same one where Wu Rui was captured.

A 1472 entry in the Ming Shilu reported that some Chinese from Nanhai escaped back to China after their ship had been blown off course into Vietnam, where they had been forced to serve as soldiers in Vietnam's military. The escapees also reported that they found out that more than 100 Chinese men remained captives in Vietnam after they were caught and castrated by the Vietnamese after their ships were blown off course into Vietnam in other incidents. The Chinese Ministry of Revenue responded by ordering Chinese civilians and soldiers to stop going abroad to foreign countries. These 100 men were taken prisoner around the same time as Wu Rui and the historian Leo K. Shin believes all of them may have been involved in illegal trade instead of being blown off course by wind. The over 100 Chinese men who were castrated and made into eunuchs by the Vietnamese remained captives in Vietnam when the incident was reported. Both the incidents of the young Chinese man Wu Rui and the more than 100 Chinese men being castrated and used as eunuchs point to possible involvement in trade according to historians John K. Whitmore and Tana Li which was then suppressed by the Vietnamese government instead of them really being blown off course by the wind. China's relations with Vietnam during this period were marked by the punishment of prisoners by castration.

==== Trịnh–Nguyễn contention ====
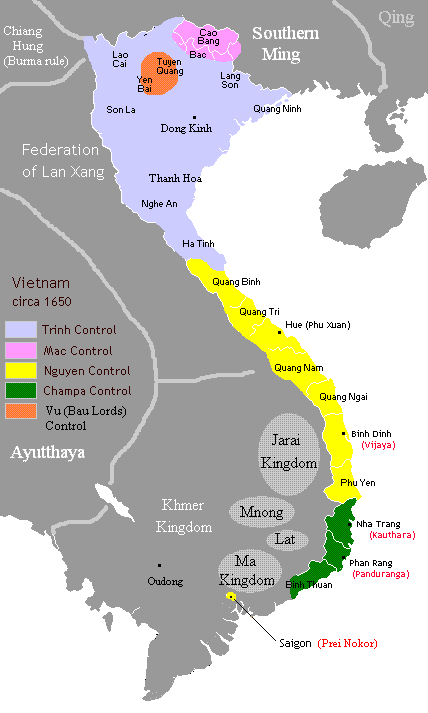
Partition of Vietnam in the 1650s, amid the Trịnh-Nguyễn war

The Trịnh lords started employing eunuchs extensively in the Đàng Ngoài region of the northern Red river delta area of Vietnam as leaders of military units. Trịnh ruled northern Vietnam used its eunuchs in the military and civilian bureaucracy. Many Buddhist temples had money and land donated by eunuchs who gained more wealth and influenced. Field army units, secret police, customs duty taxes, finance, land deeds and military registers and tax harvesting in son Nam province (Binh phien) as well as the position of Thanh Hóa military governor were delegated to eunuchs. The supervisor services, military, civil service and court all had eunuchs appointed to work in them and they were the most faithful followers of the Trịnh lords as a check on the power of civil and military officials. Eunuchs were employed as building project supervisors and provincial governors by Trịnh Cương.

=== Nguyễn dynasty ===
The poet Hồ Xuân Hương mocked eunuchs in her poem as a stand-in for criticizing the government.

Commoners were banned from undergoing castration in Vietnam. Only adult men of high social rank could be castrated. Most eunuchs were born as such with a congenital abnormality. The Vietnamese government mandated that boys born with defective genitalia were to be reported to officials, in exchange for the town being freed from mandatory labor requirements. The boy would have the option of serving as a eunuch official or serving the palace women when he became ten years old. This law was put in place in 1838 during the Nguyễn dynasty. The only males allowed inside the Forbidden City at Huế were the Emperor and his eunuchs.

The presence of eunuchs in Vietnam was used by the French colonizers to degrade the Vietnamese.

A prominent eunuch in the Nguyễn dynasty was Lê Văn Duyệt Nguyen dynasty Vietnam recruited intersex hermaphrodites as eunuchs.

The Nguyen dynasty built a eunuch cemetery in 1848 at the Tu Hieu Pagoda.

== Notable Vietnamese eunuchs ==
- Ly Thuong Kiet (1019–1105): general during the Lý dynasty in Vietnam. Penned what is considered the first Vietnamese declaration of independence. Regarded as a Vietnamese national hero.
- Lê Văn Duyệt: 18th-century Vietnamese eunuch, military strategist and government official (not a true eunuch, he was born a hermaphrodite).
- Wu Rui: a Chinese eunuch in Lê dynasty Annam (Vietnam).

== Bibliography ==
- Cooke, Nola; Li, Tana; Anderson, James, eds. (2011). The Tongking Gulf Through History (illustrated ed.). University of Pennsylvania Press. ISBN 978-0812243369.
- Lary, Diana (2007). Diana Lary (ed.). The Chinese State at the Borders (illustrated ed.). UBC Press. ISBN 978-0774813334.
- Li, Tana (2015). "8 EPIDEMICS, TRADE, AND LOCAL WORSHIP IN VIETNAM, LEIZHOU PENINSULA, AND HAINAN ISLAND". In Mair, Victor H; Kelley, Liam (eds.). Imperial China and Its Southern Neighbours. CHINA SOUTHEAST ASIA History (illustrated, reprint ed.). Institute of Southeast Asian Studies. ISBN 978-9814620536.
- Shin, Leo K. (2007). "5 Ming China and Its Border with Annam". In Lary, Diana (ed.). The Chinese State at the Borders (illustrated ed.). UBC Press. ISBN 978-0774813334.
- Tsai, Shih-Shan Henry (1996). The Eunuchs in the Ming Dynasty (Ming Tai Huan Kuan) (illustrated ed.). SUNY Press. ISBN 0791426874.
- Wade, Geoff (2005). "Southeast Asia in the Ming Shi-lu: an open access resource". Asia Research Institute and the Singapore E-Press, National University of Singapore.
- Whitmore, John K. (2011). "Chapter 6 Vân Đồn, the 'Mạc Gap,' and the End of the Jiaozhi Ocean System: Trade and State in Đại Việt, Circa 1450-1550". In Cooke, Nola; Li, Tana; Anderson, James (eds.). The Tongking Gulf Through History (illustrated ed.). University of Pennsylvania Press. ISBN 978-0812243369.
