= Renzong =

- Chinese: 仁宗
- Literal meaning: Benevolent Ancestor
Transcriptions
Standard Mandarin
- Hanyu Pinyin: Rénzōng
- Wade–Giles: Jen^{2}-tsung^{1}

Renzong is the temple name used for several emperors of China. It may refer to:

- Emperor Renzong of Song (1010–1063, reigned 1022–1063), emperor of the Song dynasty
- Emperor Renzong of Western Xia (1124–1193, reigned 1139–1193), emperor of Western Xia
- Yelü Yilie (died 1163, reigned 1150–1163), emperor of Qara Khitai (Western Liao)
- Ayurbarwada Buyantu Khan (1285–1320, reigned 1311–1320), emperor of the Yuan dynasty
- Hongxi Emperor (1378–1425, reigned 1424–1425), emperor of the Ming dynasty
- Jiaqing Emperor (1760–1820, reigned 1796–1820), emperor of the Qing dynasty

== See also ==
- Injong (disambiguation), Korean equivalent
- Nhân Tông (disambiguation), Vietnamese equivalent
