= Empress Mother Thượng Dương =

Lý dynasty regent

Empress Mother Thượng Dương (chữ Hán: 上楊皇后, ? – died 1073) was a regent of the Lý dynasty during the minority of her stepson, Emperor Lý Nhân Tông, from 1072 to 1073.

== Biography ==
Thượng Dương was the empress of Lý Thánh Tông. Her family name was Dương (楊).

When emperor Lý Thánh Tông died in 1072, she and thái sư (chancellor) Lý Đạo Thành were appointed regents for his 7-year-old son, Lý Nhân Tông, who was born to Lý Thánh Tông by his concubine, the second queen Ỷ Lan. Ỷ Lan arranged the death of Thượng Dương and her servants the following year, and Lý Đạo Thành was temporarily banished to the provinces.
