= Empress Linh Chiếu =

Vietnamese empress regent

Lê Thị or Linh Chiếu Thái hậu (1108–1161) was a Vietnamese empress regent.

She was married to emperor Lý Thần Tông, who died in 1137 when he was only 23 years old.

She served as Regent of Vietnam during the minority of her son emperor Lý Anh Tông between 1138 and 1158.
