= Lý Đạo Thành =

Medieval chancellor in the royal court of Vietnam

Lý Đạo Thành 李道成

Chancellor of the Lý dynasty
- Monarchs: Lý Thánh Tông; Lý Nhân Tông
- Succeeded by: Lê Văn Thịnh

Personal details
- Born: Unknown
- Died: 1081

Lý Đạo Thành (Chữ Hán: 李道成, ? – 1081), courtesy name Bá Định (伯定), was a member of the royal family and the chancellor in the royal court of Lý dynasty. Highly appreciated for his ability and righteousness, Lý Đạo Thành had a major role in the stability and prosperity of Annam during the early years of Lý Nhân Tông's reign when Lý Đạo Thành also acted as a regent for the young emperor. Today Lý Đạo Thành is still considered one of the great officials of the Lý dynasty and in the history of Vietnam.

== Biography ==
There was only a brief account about Lý Đạo Thành in the Đại Việt sử ký toàn thư, but according to some folk stories, Lý Đạo Thành was born in 1053 to a noble family in Thái Cực, Thọ Xương. It was said that Lý Đạo Thành was a member of the Lý royal family and already held the position of chancellor (Vietnamese: thái sư) when the emperor Lý Thánh Tông died in 1072. Together with the Empress Mother Thượng Dương, the chancellor was appointed by Lý Thánh Tông to act the regency for his successor Lý Nhân Tông, who was only 7 at that time. According to the historian Ngô Sĩ Liên, during the purge of Empress Mother Thượng Dương by the emperor and his natural mother Ỷ Lan in 1073, Lý Đạo Thành was transferred to the position of governor in the southern province Nghệ An likely because he advised against the act of Ỷ Lan and the emperor. One year later, the emperor decided to restore Lý Đạo Thành to his former post. In his Việt Nam sử lược, Trần Trọng Kim remarked that Lý Đạo Thành was not only a competent official but also possessed a strong and righteous character, therefore he had an important contribution in the stability and prosperity of Đại Việt during the early years of Lý Nhân Tông's reign.

According to the Đại Việt sử ký toàn thư, Lý Đạo Thành deceased in the tenth month in 1081. His position of chancellor was succeeded by Lê Văn Thịnh, who was afterwards deprived of all titles and banished to a remote region after a controversial treason case in 1096.

== Legacy ==
Lý Đạo Thành is considered one of the most famous chancellors of the Lý dynasty; in the book Lịch triều hiến chương loại chí, the historian Lê Tung praised Lý Đạo Thành as one of the two greatest regents of the Lý dynasty, together with Tô Hiến Thành. Today his contribution is still highly appreciated; Lý Đạo Thành is worshipped as a tutelary deity in several villages in Northern Vietnam, and a street in Hanoi is also named in his honour.
