= Injong =

Injong (Korean: 인종; Hanja: 仁宗) is the temple name used for several monarchs of Korea, derived from the Chinese equivalent Rénzōng. It may refer to:

- Injong of Goryeo (1109–1146, reigned 1122–1146), king of Goryeo
- Injong of Joseon (1515–1545, reigned 1544–1545), king of Joseon

== See also ==
- Renzong (disambiguation), Chinese equivalent
- Nhân Tông (disambiguation), Vietnamese equivalent
