= Việt Nam sử lược =

Vietnamese history text (published 1920)

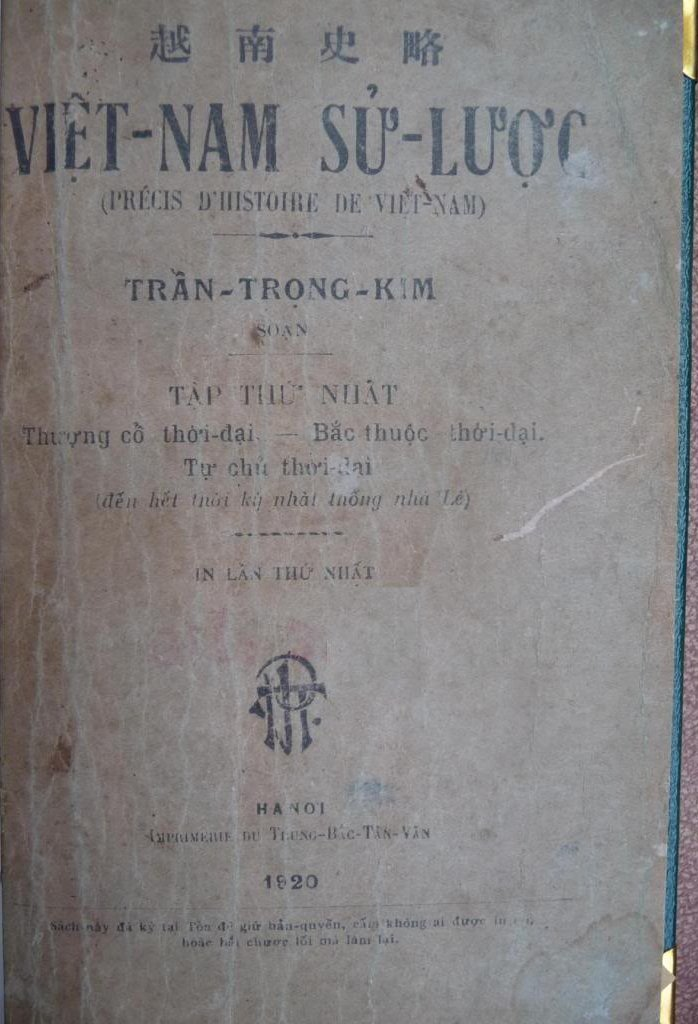
- Author: Trần Trọng Kim
- Original title: Việt Nam sử lược
- Language: Vietnamese
- Subject: History of Vietnam
- Genre: Historiography
- Publication date: 1920
- Publication place: Vietnam

Việt Nam sử lược (chữ Hán: 越南史略, French: Précis d'Histoire du Việt-Nam, lit. "Outline History of Vietnam"), was the first history text published in the Vietnamese language and the Vietnamese alphabet. It was compiled by Vietnamese historian Trần Trọng Kim. It covered the period from Hồng Bàng dynasty to the time of French Indochina. The book was first published in 1920 and reprinted many times. It was the standard history text in South Vietnam.

Hồ Quý Ly has been condemned by modern historians. The leaders of the Tây Sơn Rebellion were heroes to the Communists, but condemned by mainstream historians.

== Background ==
In 1883, Vietnam became a French protectorate, with Vietnamese emperors as mere puppet rulers of the French with little power. The country faced an uncertain future. Trần Trọng Kim believed that if the Vietnamese people knew their own history, they would be patriotic and contribute to national growth.

However, all historical texts were written in classical Chinese. The usage of classical Chinese had died out in Vietnam early in the 20th century. Tran was concerned that since the Vietnamese people could no longer read classical Chinese, Vietnam's history would be lost. He decided to preserve Vietnamese history by writing a history of Vietnam in the Vietnamese language and script.

== Contents ==
Việt Nam sử lược contained five parts:

1. Early historical period: From Hồng Bàng dynasty to Triệu dynasty;
2. Period Belonging to the North: From First Chinese domination to the establishment of Ngô dynasty;
3. Independent period (unified period): Ngô dynasty, Đinh dynasty, Early Lê dynasty, Lý dynasty, Trần dynasty, Lê dynasty;
4. Independent period (Southern-Northern conflict period): From Mạc dynasty to Tây Sơn dynasty;
5. Recent and modern period: From Nguyễn dynasty to early 20th century.

Contents of the Việt Nam sử lược
Chapter No. (Chương)	Title	English translation
	Tựa	Perface
	Nước Việt Nam	Vietnam
THƯỢNG-CỔ THỜI-ĐẠI - Early historical period
Chapter No. (Chương)	Title	English translation
1	Họ Hồng-bàng	Hồng-bàng family
2	Nhà Thục	Thục dynasty
3	Xã-hội nước Tàu	Society of China
4	Nhà Triệu	Triệu dynasty
BẮC-THUỘC THỜI-ĐẠI - Period Belonging to the North
Chapter No. (Chương)	Title	English translation
1	Bắc-thuộc lần thứ nhất	First Northern domination
2	Trưng-vương	Trưng king
3	Bắc-thuộc lần thứ hai	Second Northern domination
4	Nhà Tiền-Lý	Early Lý dynasty
5	Bắc-thuộc lần thứ ba	Third Northern domination
6	Kết-quả của thời-đại Bắc-thuộc	The result of Northern domination Period
TỰ-CHỦ THỜI-ĐẠI - Independent period
Chapter No. (Chương)	Title	English translation
1	Nhà Ngô	Ngô dynasty
2	Nhà Đinh	Đinh dynasty
3	Nhà Tiền-Lê	Early Lê dynasty
4	Nhà Lý	Lý dynasty
5	Nhà Lý (tiếp theo)	Lý dynasty (sequel)
6	Nhà Trần (Thời-kỳ thứ nhất)	Trần dynasty (first period)
7	Giặc nhà Nguyên — I	Yuan dynasty invasion — I
8	Giặc nhà Nguyên — II	Yuan dynasty invasion — II
9	Nhà Trần (Thời-kỳ thứ hai)	Trần dynasty (second period)
10	Nhà Trần (Thời-kỳ thứ ba)	Trần dynasty (third period)
11	Nhà Hồ	Hồ dynasty
12	Nhà Hậu-Trần	Later Trần dynasty
13	Thuộc nhà Minh	Ming dynasty domination
14	Mười năm đánh quân Tàu	Ten years fight against Chinese army
15	Nhà Lê	Lê dynasty
TỰ-CHỦ THỜI-ĐẠI (Thời-kỳ Nam Bắc phân-tranh) - Independent period (Southern-Northern conflict period)
Chapter No. (Chương)	Title	English translation
1	Lịch Triều lược-kỷ	Brief history of each rulers' reign (including Revival Lê dynasty, Mạc dynasty, Trịnh lords and Nguyễn lords)
2	Nam-triều — Bắc-triều	Southern dynasty — Northern dynasty
3	Trịnh Nguyễn phân-tranh	Trịnh Nguyễn conflict
4	Sự chiến-tranh	War
5	Công việc họ Trịnh làm ở ngoài Bắc	Affairs of Trịnh family in the north
6	Công việc họ Nguyễn làm ở miền Nam	Affairs of Nguyễn family in the south
7	Người Âu-châu sang nước Nam	Europeans came to Vietnam
8	Vận trung-suy của chúa Nguyễn	The decline of Nguyễn lords
9	Họ Trịnh mất nghiệp chúa	Trịnh family lost their lord throne
10	Nhà Hậu-Lê mất ngôi vua	Later Lê dynasty lost the throne
11	Nhà Nguyễn Tây-sơn	Tây Sơn Nguyễn dynasty
12	Nguyễn-vương nhất-thống nước Nam	Nguyễn vương unified Vietnam
CẬN-KIM THỜI ĐẠI - Recent and modern period
Chapter No. (Chương)	Title	English translation
1	Nguyễn-thị Thế-tổ	Nguyễn Thế Tổ
2	Thánh-tổ	Thánh Tổ
3	Thánh-tổ (tiếp theo)	Thánh Tổ (sequel)
4	Hiến-tổ	Hiến Tổ
5	Dực-tông	Dực Tông
6	Chế-độ tình-thế nước Việt-Nam cuối đời Tự-đức	The institution and situation in the late Tự Dực period
7	Nước Pháp lấy Nam-kỳ	French seized Cochinchina
8	Giặc-giã ở trong nước	rebels in the country
9	Quân nước Pháp lấy Bắc-kỳ lần thứ nhất	First French occupation of Tonkin
10	Tình-thế nước Nam từ năm Giáp-tuất về sau	The situation after the year Giáp Tuất (1874)
11	Quân nước Pháp lấy Bắc-kỳ lần thứ hai	Second French occupation of Tonkin
12	Cuộc bảo-hộ của nước Pháp	French protectorate
13	Chiến-tranh với nước Tàu	War with China
14	Loạn ở Trung-kỳ	Rebellions in Annam
15	Việc đánh dẹp ở Trung-kỳ và ở Bắc-kỳ	Pacification of Annam and Tonkin
16	Công-việc của người Pháp tại Việt-nam	Affairs of French in Vietnam
TỔNG KẾT - conclusion
NIÊN BIỂU - timeline

== References of this book ==
=== Written in chữ Nho and chữ Quốc Ngữ ===
1. Đại Việt sử ký toàn thư- Ngô Sĩ Liên
2. Khâm định Việt sử thông giám cương mục
3. Trần triều thế phổ hành trang
4. Bình Nguyên công thần thực lục
5. Hoàng Lê nhất thống chí
6. Lịch triều hiến chương- Phan Huy Chú
7. Đại Nam thực lục tiền biên
8. Đại Nam thực lục chính biên
9. Đại Nam thống chí
10. Đại Nam chính biên liệt truyện
11. Đại Nam điển lễ toát yếu- Đỗ Văn Tâm
12. Minh Mệnh chính yếu
13. Quốc triều sử toát yếu- Cao Xuân Dục
14. Thanh triều sử ký
15. Trung Quốc lịch sử
16. Hạnh Thục ca- Nguyễn Nhược Thị

=== Written in French ===
1. Cours d' Histoire Annamite – Trương Vĩnh Ký
2. Notion d' Histoire d'Annam – Charles Maybon and Henri Russier
3. Pays d' Annam – E. Luro
4. L'Empire d' Annam – Charles Gosselin
5. Abrégé de l'Histoire d'Annam – Alfred Schreiner
6. Histoire de la Cochinchine – P. Cultru
7. Les Origines de la question du Tong-kin, 1896 – Jean Dupuis
8. Le Tonkin de 1872 à 1866 – Jean Dupuis
9. La Vie de Monseigneur Puginier – Louis-Eugène Louvet
10. L'insurrection de Gia Định – Jean Silvestre

== Bibliography ==
- Patricia M. Pelley (2002). Postcolonial Vietnam: New Histories of the National Past. ISBN 0822329662.
