= Nguyễn Thị Bích =

Vietnamese poet

Nguyễn Thị Bích(阮氏碧), also known as Nguyễn Nhược Thị Bích (阮若氏碧, An Phuớc District, Ninh Thuận, 1830–1909) was a Vietnamese poet. She was a literate lady at the Huế court whose experiences in the 1885 flight of Hàm Nghi are recorded in her best known work Hạnh Thục ca, Song of Voyage to Thục.
