= Lý Thần Tông =

Lý Thần Tông 李神宗
- Emperor of Đại Việt

Emperor of Đại Việt
- Reign: 1128–1138
- Predecessor: Lý Nhân Tông
- Successor: Lý Anh Tông

Emperor of the Lý dynasty
- Reign: 1128–1138
- Predecessor: Lý Nhân Tông
- Successor: Lý Anh Tông
- Born: 6 February 1116; Thăng Long
- Died: 31 December 1138 (aged 22); Vĩnh Quang palace, Thăng Long
- Burial: Thọ Tomb
- Spouse: Empress Lệ Thiên (Lý thị) (儷天皇后李氏); Empress Linh Chiếu (Lê thị) (靈照皇后黎氏); Empress Phụng Thánh(Lê thị) (奉聖夫人黎氏); Empress Minh Bảo(Lê thị) (明寶夫人黎氏); Concubine Chương Anh(章英次妃)
- Issue: Duke of Minh Đạo Lý Thiên Lộc [明道王李天祿] Lý Anh Tông; Princess Thụy Thiên (瑞天公主)
Names
- Lý Dương Hoán (李陽煥)
Era dates
- Thiên Thuận (1128–1132); Thiên Chương Bảo Tự (1133–1138)
Regnal name
- Thuận Thiên Duệ Vũ Tường Linh Cảm Ứng Khoan Nhân Quảng Hiếu Hoàng Đế (順天睿武祥靈感應寬仁廣孝皇帝)
Posthumous name
- Quảng Nhân Sùng Hiếu Văn Vũ Hoàng Đế (廣仁崇孝文武皇帝)
Temple name
- Thần Tông (神宗)
- House: Lý
- Father: Sùng Hiền hầu(son of Lý Thánh Tông)
- Mother: Lady Đỗ
- Religion: Buddhism

Lý Thần Tông (1116–1138), personal name Lý Dương Hoán, was the fifth emperor of the Lý dynasty, reigning over Đại Việt from 1127 to his death in 1138. Becoming the ruler of Đại Việt at the age of twelve, Lý Thần Tông successfully maintained the order of the royal court and strengthened the stability of the country with the assistance of capable officials. For that reason, Đại Việt under Lý Thần Tông was able to witness a peaceful period like during the reign of his predecessors. However, Lý Thần Tông died at age 22 before passing the throne to his crown prince Lý Thiên Tộ.

== Early years ==
He was born in the summer of 1116 as Lý Dương Hoán to Lady Đỗ and the Marquis of Sùng Hiền (Vietnamese: Sùng Hiền hầu) who was son of the Emperor Lý Thánh Tông and younger brother of the Emperor Lý Nhân Tông. According to the Đại Việt sử ký toàn thư, Lý Dương Hoán was born right after the death of the monk Từ Đạo Hạnh, one of the most important figures of the Early Lý dynasty, which implied that Lý Dương Hoán might be the incarnation of Từ Đạo Hạnh. At that time, the Emperor Lý Nhân Tông was unable to have his own child, and thus he decided to adopt sons of the Marquises Sùng Hiền, Thành Khánh, Thành Quảng, Thành Chiêu, Thành Hưng, so that the emperor could choose a capable successor to maintain the throne for the Lý dynasty. Finally, being an intelligent and vivacious boy, Lý Dương Hoán was made by Lý Thần Tông the crown prince of the Lý dynasty at the age of two in 1117.

In December 1127, Lý Nhân Tông died at Vĩnh Quang Palace and was succeeded by the Crown Prince Lý Dương Hoán, now Lý Thần Tông. Immediately after the coronation, Thần Tông began to regulate the royal court and the royal family in order to keep the stability of the Lý dynasty in the wake of Nhân Tông's death. This action of Lý Thần Tông was criticized by contemporary historians Lê Văn Hưu and Ngô Sĩ Liên who thought that Lý Thần Tông should have been in mourning for his predecessor for a longer period to show his respect for the departed emperor.

== As emperor ==
Lý Thần Tông

Vietnamese name
- Vietnamese: Lý Thần Tông
- Hán-Nôm: 李神宗

After the enthronement, Lý Thần Tông changed the era name to Thiên Thuận (1128–1132) and made his adoptive mother Lady Trần Anh the Empress Mother of the Lý dynasty. During the reign, the Emperor changed the era name one more time to Thiên Chương Bảo Tự (1133–1138).

Although he had been not long on the Lý throne, Lý Thần Tông at once made several major changes in the royal court such as relaxing strict laws, appointing officials for important positions and maintaining diplomatic relations with the Song dynasty and the Kingdom of Champa. At that time, the Đại Việt's borders were fairly stable except for some skirmishes with the Khmer ruler Suryavarman II, starting in 1128, and Champa, which were driven out by the Lý army without difficulty. Besides the Emperor, the victory over Champa was also attributed to the protection of the Buddhist and Taoist deities, an opinion that the historian Lê Văn Hưu did not agree with since the historian thought that the victory in battlefield was solely due to the ability of the commander.

- Birth name
- Vietnamese alphabet: Lý Dương Hoán
- Hán-Nôm: 李陽煥

In the first month of 1129, the Emperor bestowed his real father and mother Marquis Sùng Hiền and Lady Đỗ thị on titles the Retired Emperor (Thái thượng hoàng) and the Empress Mother (Hoàng thái hậu) of the Lý dynasty. The decision of Lý Thần Tông was met with criticism from Lê Văn Hưu because of its unorthodoxy according to the feudal tradition in which the Emperor should accept only one origin, in this case was the late Lý Nhân Tông and his empress. Lê Văn Hưu, together with Ngô Sĩ Liên, again criticized Lý Thần Tông for his order in the first month of 1130 that every daughter of the mandarins in the royal court had to be available for the emperor's selection of concubines and ones who were not chosen could only get married afterwards. Because of the young age of the emperor, Ngô Sĩ Liên and Lê Văn Hưu often pointed their criticisms to Lý Thần Tông's officials who were considered ( by the historians ) lacking ability and being flatterers. However, Lý Thần Tông was later considered in the Đại Việt sử ký toàn thư a skilled ruler who was able to choose and use talented officials and hold the stability of the Lý dynasty. On the other hand, the modern historian Trần Trọng Kim wrote in his Việt Nam sử lược that Đại Việt was able to witness a peaceful era during the reign of Lý Thần Tông thanks to some capable mandarins such as Trương Bá Ngọc, Lưu Khánh Đàm and Dương Anh Nhị and the policy of "ngụ binh ư nông" which meant conscripting farmers into the army for a period of six months and release them for the remaining six months so that they could resume their farming work and thus the agriculture of the country was not affected by military activities.

In 1136 Lý Thần Tông contracted a severe disease that his physicians could not cure, so a monk named Nguyễn Minh Không stepped up and helped the emperor survive his disease and recover. There was a legend said that Nguyễn Minh Không learned the disease's antidote of disease from his master Từ Đạo Hạnh before he died. Nevertheless, Lý Thần Tông survived for only two years, he died on the 26th day of the ninth month of 1138 at the age of 23 and was succeeded by Lý Anh Tông.

== Family ==
Lý Thần Tông entitled his empress, the Empress Consort Lệ Thiên (Lệ Thiên Hoàng hậu) Lý thị in 1128. At the same time, Lý Thần Tông also married the niece Lê thị of the chancellor Lê Xương, who was entitled as Lady Minh Bảo (Minh Bảo phu nhân).

The first son of Lý Thần Tông and Lady Minh Bảo Lê thị was Lý Thiên Tộ who was born in the fourth month in Lunar calendar of 1136. Initially Lý Thiên Tộ was not chosen the crown prince of the Lý dynasty because his father preferred Lý Thiên Lộc who was son of his favourite concubine and born before Lý Thiên Tộ in 1132. In the ninth month of 1138, the ill emperor decided to make Lý Thiên Tộ his successor and downgraded Lý Thiên Lộc to Prince Minh Đạo (Minh Đạo vương) after a campaign opened by three other concubines of the Emperor, Ladies Cảm Thánh, Nhật Phụng and Phụng Thánh, who were afraid that the coronation of a concubine's son would menace their position in royal family. Besides Lý Thiên Tộ and Lý Thiên Lộc, the emperor had a stillborn daughter in 1132, a third prince with unknown name born in 1137 and the Princess Thụy Thiên who was also born in 1137.

Lý Thần Tông House of Lý Born: 1116 Died: 1138
Regnal titles
Preceded by Lý Nhân Tông	Emperor of the Lý dynasty 1127–1138	Succeeded by Lý Anh Tông
