= Hạnh Thục ca =

The Hạnh Thục ca (幸蜀歌, 1885 in "Song of Voyage to Thục") is the best known work of Nguyễn Thị Bích, a Vietnamese court lady. The poem describes her experiences in the 1885 flight of Hàm Nghi. It is written in vernacular chữ Nôm using lục bát verse.

First 8 lines of Hạnh Thục ca
Vietnamese alphabet (chữ Quốc Ngữ, 𡨸國語)
Ngẫm cơ tạo hóa khôn lường,
Trải xem trị loạn lẽ thường xưa nay.
Thịnh suy thế vận lần xoay,
Non sông như cũ đổi thay không cùng.
Nước ta Nam Việt phân phong,
Hiệu Hồng bàng thị vốn dòng Thần nông.
Trị đời mười tám vua Hùng,
Hai ngàn năm lẻ đều cùng nối noi.
