= Kang Senghui =

Sogdian Buddhist monk and translator (died 280)

Kang Senghui

Kang Senghui (traditional: 康僧會; simplified: 康僧会; pinyin: Kāng Sēnghuì; Wade–Giles: K'ang Seng-hui; Vietnamese: Khương Tăng Hội; died 280) was a Buddhist monk and translator during the Three Kingdoms period of ancient China. He was born in Jiaozhi (modern-day northern Vietnam). He was the son of a Sogdian merchant, hence the last name of Kang, meaning "one whose forefathers had been people from Kangju", or Sogdia. Kang received a Chinese literary education and was "widely read in the six (Confucian) classics." He also read Sanskrit and was known for his knowledge of the Tripiṭaka (the Buddhist canon). He joined the saïgha (the Buddhist monastic order) as a teenager, following the death of his parents. Kang contributed more to the diffusion of Buddhist sutras as a preacher than to their translation into the Chinese language as there are only two collections of avadānas in the canon which are attributed to him. According to legend, the first Buddha relic in China appeared in a vase in 248 C.E. so that Kang Senghui would have something to show a local ruler. Sun Quan, the king of Eastern Wu, would unsuccessfully attempt to destroy the tooth by subjecting it to various tests.

Kang is known as Khương Tăng Hội in Vietnam and Thông Biện (1096) claims scriptural traditions from Kang influenced Vietnamese Buddhism, though there is no independent evidence for this tradition.

Khương Tăng Hội is regarded as the first Vietnamese patriarch of Zen Buddhism in Vietnam.

== See also ==
- Silk Road transmission of Buddhism

== Sources ==
- Nattier, Jan (2008). A Guide to the Earliest Chinese Buddhist Translations: Texts from the Eastern Han and Three Kingdoms Periods, Bibliotheca Philologica et Philosophica, IRIAB Vol. X, 149–154; ISBN 978-4-904234-00-6
- Strong, J.S. (2007). Relics of the Buddha. Princeton University Press. ISBN 978-0-691-11764-5.
- Zurcher, Erik (2007). The Buddhist Conquest of China. Leiden: Brill. ISBN 90-04-15604-6
