= Lê Văn Thịnh =

Lê Văn Thịnh 黎文盛
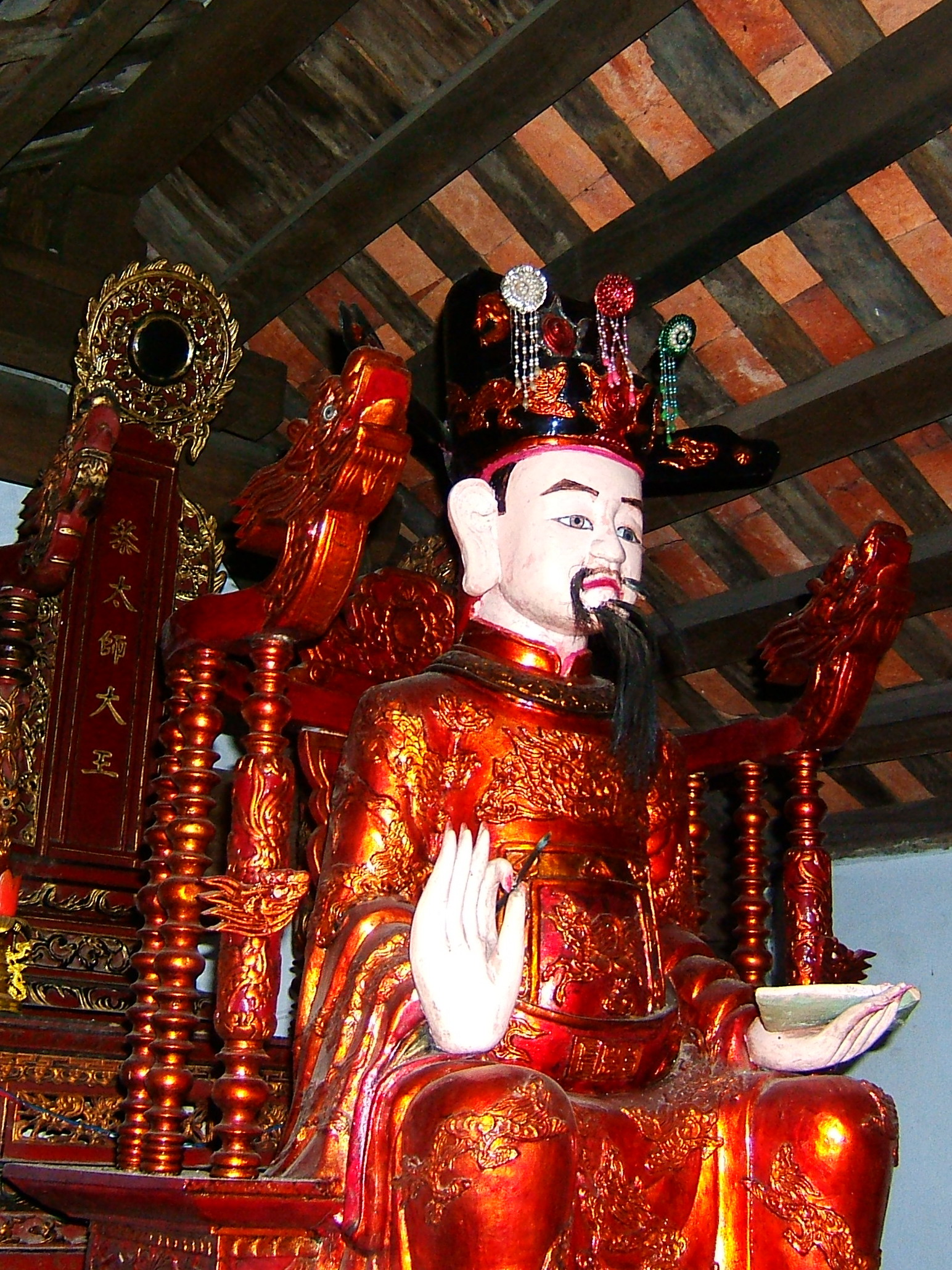
- Statue of Lê Văn Thịnh in the Đông Cứu Temple

Chancellor of the Lý dynasty
- Monarch: Lý Nhân Tông
- Preceded by: Lý Đạo Thành

Personal details
- Born: 1038
- Died: 1096 (aged 57–58)

Lê Văn Thịnh (Chữ Hán: 黎文盛, 1038 – 1096), courtesy name Mậu Phu (茂夫), was an official in the royal court of the Lý dynasty. Ranking first in the first imperial examination of the Lý dynasty, Lê Văn Thịnh was appointed tutor for Lý Nhân Tông and was gradually promoted to the position of chancellor of the Lý dynasty due to his achievements, especially in the negotiation with the Song dynasty about the return of occupied land by the Song army to Annam in 1086.

Lê Văn Thịnh was charged with high treason in 1096 and was banished to the mountainous area. Today the fact about the 1096 event is still a matter of debate.

== Biography ==
Lê Văn Thịnh he was born in 1038 at the Đông Cứu village, Gia Định district. In the second month of 1075, the emperor Lý Nhân Tông ordered the organization of the first imperial examination of the Lý dynasty, which was also the first contest based on Confucianist education in the history of Vietnam. Lê Văn Thịnh who ranked first in the examination and thus became the first first-rank laureate in history of imperial examination in Vietnam; therefore, he was sometimes dubbed "Tiến sĩ khai khoa" (The first doctorate) or "Trạng nguyên đầu tiên" (The first exemplar of the state) of Vietnam. Lê Văn Thịnh's success came from his laboriousness in learning Confucian classics while others often relied on Buddhist knowledge. After the examination, Lê Văn Thịnh was appointed to the position of tutor for the young emperor.

In the sixth month of 1086, the deputy military minister (Thị lang bộ Binh) Lê Văn Thịnh took the important mission of negotiating with the Song dynasty about the return of a vast area of Đại Việt land which had been occupied by the Song dynasty after the 1075 war between two countries. Because of Lê Văn Thịnh's diplomatic skill, the Song dynasty finally agreed to give back six districts and three mountainous regions (động) which corresponded to the region of Quảng Nguyên. For this feat, Lê Văn Thịnh was promoted to the position of chancellor of the Lý dynasty (Thái sư). This was the second-highest position in the royal court and was only behind the emperor. Lê Văn Thịnh was one of the finest examples for a scholar who gained his promotion solely through examination and talent.

== Treason case ==
In Đại Việt sử ký toàn thư, the historians recounted the treason case in the third month of 1096 that effectively ended the career of Lê Văn Thịnh:

— At that time the emperor took a small boat to watch fishing in the Dâm Đàm Lake. Suddenly there was fog in which the emperor heard the sound of an approaching boat and the noise of rowing oars, then the emperor threw spear. After a few moments, the mist dissolved, there was a tiger in the boat that made people scared, they said: "It is disastrous!". The fisherman Mục Thận cast a net into the tiger, it turned out it was the chancellor Lê Văn Thịnh.

The chancellor was immediately captured and charged with high treason while Mục Thận was granted a position of mandarin and an area near Dâm Đàm Lake for fief. In explaining the strange context of the crime, Ngô Sĩ Liên revealed that Lê Văn Thịnh learned the sorcery from his Dali servant with the purpose of overthrowing Lý Nhân Tông. Although the crime of killing the emperor and usurping the throne was considered the most serious crime in the system of rules of the Lý dynasty, Lý Nhân Tông, holding a high regard for Lê Văn Thịnh's achievement in the royal court, only banished the former chancellor to the remote region of Thao Giang (now Cẩm Khê, Phú Thọ) where he died in 1096. The decision of Lý Nhân Tông was criticized by Ngô Sĩ Liên who reasoned that the graciousness of the emperor might spring from his devotion to Buddhism. In Đại Việt sử lược, an historical book which was compiled before Đại Việt sử ký toàn thư and considered the earliest surviving historical source of Đại Việt, this event was recited almost identically as Đại Việt sử ký toàn thư except for the odd element of Lê Văn Thịnh transforming into a tiger. This element was also excluded from the Từ điển bách khoa toàn thư Việt Nam, which noted that Lê Văn Thịnh was exiled to Thao Giang because the emperor suspected that his chancellor might have a conspiracy to overthrow him. According to folk legend, Lê Văn Thịnh spent his last days in Đình Tổ village (now Thuận Thành, Bắc Ninh) where the likely site of his grave still remains.

A modern viewpoint is that the Chancellor morphs into a tiger (Thái sư hóa hổ) story in Ngô Sĩ Liên's work might be derived from the book Việt điện u linh (Compilation of the potent spirits in the Realm of Việt) of Lý Tế Xuyên; this hypothesis can explain the existence of such mythic elements in an official historical record for a dynasty like Đại Việt sử ký toàn thư. Moreover, the story in Việt điện u linh was gathered from the folk story with the main purpose of praising Mục Thận, who was the tutelary deity of Trích Sài village; therefore its accuracy needs to be placed in doubt. During the dynastic time in Vietnam, normally anyone who was tried for treason was killed or forced to commit suicide; therefore the light verdict of Lý Nhân Tông in the case of Lê Văn Thịnh rose a current of beliefs that the chancellor was unjustly judged or wrongly blamed with the crime of treason. The historian Phan Huy Lê, a renowned researcher of History of Vietnam also expressed his doubt about the real motive of the Lê Văn Thịnh's trial, reckoning that the traditional idea of accusing Lê Văn Thịnh was not really appropriate since the story that Lê Văn Thịnh changed into a tiger to kill the emperor could not happen. A more striking hypothesis proposed that the case of Lê Văn Thịnh was the result of the struggle between supporters of Buddhism led by the imperial consort Ỷ Lan and supporters of Confucianism represented by Lê Văn Thịnh. To repress the influence of Confucianism in the royal court, Ỷ Lan made a plot of slandering the chancellor with the crime of treason. This hypothesis was based on the fact that the Imperial Consort Ỷ Lan was a devotee of Buddhism and had used ruthless methods to eliminate her rival in the royal family, the Empress Consort Thượng Dương. On the other hand, Lê Văn Thịnh was proved to be a loyal official with many achievements and did not have any sign of forming party or hatred towards the emperor before the 1096 event. Also asserting that Lê Văn Thịnh was the victim of a struggle in the royal court, another hypothesis speculated that he was harmed because of his ideas about reforming the royal court and the country. According to this hypothesis, Lê Văn Thịnh's innovative thought made him an obstacle for the conservative side in the royal court and thus he was unjustly treated like the chancellor Wang Anshi of the Song dynasty who lived at the same time as Lê Văn Thịnh and also wanted to reform his country.

== Legacy ==
Inspired from the early period of the Lý dynasty, the writer Tào Mạt created the chèo play The ballad of defending the country (Bài ca giữ nước) in which Lê Văn Thịnh became the main villain of the third part with many crimes. The play was highly appreciated for its artistic value, but the negative characterization of Lê Văn Thịnh was sometimes challenged for its precision.

Because of his clear contributions to the Lý dynasty and the confusing situation of the treason case, Lê Văn Thịnh is still considered today to be a prominent figure in history of the Lý dynasty in particular, and of Vietnam in general. He was often cited as the pioneer of the Confucian education and study in Vietnam. Although he was judged as a criminal of the dynasty, Lê Văn Thịnh is always worshipped by the people in his homeland Bắc Ninh where the former chancellor is the tutelary deity of fourteen villages, there he is considered the symbol of knowledge and the fondness for learning. Each year, the people in each of the fourteen villages always hold a traditional festival to commemorate the feats of Lê Văn Thịnh. A street in Ho Chi Minh City is also named in honour of Lê Văn Thịnh.
