= Thông Biện =

Vietnamese historian and Thiền master (died 1134)

Thông Biện (通辯) born Trí Không (d.1134) was a Vietnamese Buddhist historian and Thiền master whose recorded statements are the earliest written source for the history of Buddhism in Vietnam. He was a student of Viên Chiếu (圓照). He is mentioned in the Lives of Eminent Thiền Monks (禪苑集英, 1337):

Early on, when the Buddha Dharma came to the lower Yangzi region and still had not been established, yet in Luy Lau [in central Jiaozhi] more than twenty precious temples were built, more than five hundred monks were ordained, and fifteen volumes of scriptures were translated from Sanskrit into Chinese. Because of this earlier connection, there already were monks and nuns like Mo Luo Qi Yu, Kang Senghui, Zhi Jiang Liang, and Mou Bo there." Eminent Monks of the Thien Community (1337) text adapted by Dutton (1997) from Nguyễn Tử Cương

The four monks mentioned are Mo Luo Qi Yu (Ma Ha Kỳ Vực) Kang Senghui (Khương Tăng Hội), Zhi Jiang Liang (Chi Cương Lương), and Mou Bo (Mâu Bác, i.e. vi:Mâu Tử) author of the Mouzi Lihuolun (Lý Hoặc Luận).

The Queen Mother Ỷ Lan consulted the monk Thông Biện regarding the history of Buddhism in Vietnam in 1096 prior to her commencement of the plan to build 100 pagodas.

== See also ==
- Buddhism in Vietnam
