= Lý Anh Tông =

Emperor of Đại Việt from 1138 to 1175

Lý Anh Tông; 李英宗
- Emperor of Đại Việt

Emperor of Đại Việt
- Reign: 1138 – 14 August 1175
- Predecessor: Lý Thần Tông
- Successor: Lý Cao Tông
- Regent: Đỗ Anh Vũ

Emperor of the Lý dynasty
- Reign: 1138–1175
- Predecessor: Lý Thần Tông
- Successor: Lý Cao Tông
- Born: 14 April 1136; Thăng Long
- Died: 14 August 1175 (aged 39); Thuỵ Quang palace (瑞光殿), Thăng Long
- Burial: Thọ Tomb
- Spouse: Empress Chiêu Linh; Empress Linh Đạo
- Issue: Duke of Bảo Quốc Lý Long Xưởng (保國王李龍昶; 1151–1181); Lý Cao Tông; Duke of Lý Nguyên (李元王; ?–1221); Duke of Kiến Ninh Lý Long Minh (建寧王李龍明; 1152–1175); Duke of Kiến Tĩnh Lý Long Hòa (建靖王李龍華; 1152–1175); Duke of Kiến An Lý Long Đức (建安王李龍德; 1153–1175); Duke of Kiến Khang Lý Long Ích (建康王李龍益; 1167–1212); Duke of Kiến Bình Lý Long Tường (建平王李龍祥)
Names
- Lý Thiên Tộ (李天祚)
Era dates
- Thiệu Minh (紹明, 1138–1139); Đại Định (大定, 1140–1162); Chính Long Bảo Ứng (政隆寶應, 1163–1173); Thiên Cảm Chí Bảo (天感至寶, 1174–1175)
Regnal name
- Thể Thiên Thuận Đạo Duệ Văn Thần Võ Thuần Nhân Hiển Nghĩa Huy Mưu Thánh Trí Ngự Dân Dục Vật Quần Linh Phi Ứng Đại Minh Chí Hiếu Hoàng Đế (體天順道睿文神武純仁顯義徽謀聖智御民育物群靈丕應大明至孝皇帝)
Temple name
- Anh Tông (英宗)
- House: Lý
- Father: Lý Thần Tông
- Mother: Empress Linh Chiếu
- Religion: Buddhism

Emperor Lý Anh Tông (1136 – 14 August 1175) of Đại Việt (lit. 'Great Viet') was the sixth emperor of the later Lý dynasty in Vietnamese history, from 1138 until his death in 1175. Since Lý Anh Tông, given name Lý Thiên Tộ (李 天 祚), was chosen as the successor of his father Lý Thần Tông at the age of only two, the early period of his reign witnessed the dominant position of Đỗ Anh Vũ in the royal court until he died in 1157; afterwards, the Emperor ruled the country with the assistance of a prominent official named Tô Hiến Thành. The reign of Lý Anh Tông was considered the last relatively stable period of the Lý dynasty before the turbulence during the reign of Lý Cao Tông.

== Early years ==
Anh Tông was born during the third lunar month of 1136 as Lý Thiên Tộ, the first son of Lý Thần Tông and Lê Thị, the Emperor and Empress of Vietnam. Initially Lý Thiên Tộ wasn't chosen as the Lý dynasty crown prince because his father preferred Lý Thiên Lộc, four years older and the son of his favourite concubine. In the ninth month of 1138, the ill emperor decided to make Lý Thiên Tộ his successor and demote Lý Thiên Lộc to Prince Minh Đạo (Vietnamese: Minh Đạo vương) after a campaign launched by three other concubines of the Emperor, Ladies Cảm Thánh, Nhật Phụng and Phụng Thánh, who were afraid that the coronation of a concubine's son would threaten their positions in the royal family.

Soon after naming his successor, on the 26th day of the same month, Lý Thần Tông died. On the first day of the tenth lunar month (5 November), two-year-old Lý Anh Tông ascended the throne. After changing the era name to Thiệu Minh, he elevated his mother (Lady Cảm Thánh) to Empress Emeritus Lê Thị of the Lý dynasty. During his 37-year reign, Lý Anh Tông had three more era names: Đại Định (1140–1162), Chính Long Bảo Ứng (1163–1173) and Thiên Cảm Chí Bảo (1174–1175).

== As emperor ==
=== Early reign (1138–1157) ===
Since he had attained the throne at such a young age, the child emperor was ruler in name only, with the real power in Empress Lê Thị, who acted as regent for her son. Since Empress Lê Thị favored Đỗ Anh Vũ, the royal court witnessed the rising power of this official who decided almost all matters of the country and despised other officials. According to Ngô Sĩ Liên in Đại Việt sử ký toàn thư, the reason for the favouritism of Empress Lê Thị for Đỗ Anh Vũ was the secret personal relationship between them; as a result, some mandarins, such as Vũ Đái, Nguyễn Dương, Nguyễn Quốc, and Dương Tự Minh tried to topple Đỗ Anh Vũ but failed and thus died under his order. After the death of the Empress in 1147, Đỗ Anh Vũ maintained his strong position in the royal court until his death in the eighth month of 1158. The rise of Đỗ Anh Vũ in the royal court was considered by Ngô Sĩ Liên as a bad judgment on the Emperor's part and one of the more serious weaknesses of Lý Anh Tông's reign.

In 1140, the priest Thân Lợi, calling himself the son of Lý Nhân Tông, raised a revolt against Lý Anh Tông in the northern region (now Thái Nguyên). The army of Thân Lợi successfully dominated the frontier region and defeated the army of the royal court led by the high-ranking official Lưu Vũ Nhĩ. After the victory, Thân Lợi, proclaimed himself King Bình (Bình Vương), and directly attacked the capital Thăng Long. Đỗ Anh Vũ, the chancellor, assumed the task of suppressing the rebellion, a mission that he accomplished after five months. Thân Lợi was later captured by Tô Hiến Thành and beheaded on the order of Lý Anh Tông.

The Lý dynasty issued several edicts during the early years of Lý Anh Tông's reign designed to lessen the more severe laws at that time. In 1142, to memorialize the rebellion of the Trưng sisters against the Chinese domination, Lý Anh Tông ordered the still existing Temple of Trưng sisters be built in the southern suburbs of Thăng Long. Lý Anh Tông was also considered the first emperor of Đại Việt to promote Buddhism as the state religion. Another critical decision of the royal court was the military campaign against the King Jaya Harivarman I of Champa to replace Harivarman I with Vangsaraja, who was supported by the Lý dynasty. In 1152, Lý Anh Tông appointed the general Lý Mông to command over 5,000 soldiers. Thanh Hóa and Nghệ An began the campaign, which ultimately ended in defeat for the Lý dynasty and the deaths of both Lý Mông and Vamsaraja at Battle of Mỹ Sơn. In 1154, to heal the broken relation with the Lý dynasty, Jaya Harivarman I sent his daughter to Đại Việt, where the Lý king married her as his concubine. The decision of Lý Anh Tông was criticized by the historians Ngô Sĩ Liên and Lê Văn Hưu, who argued that instead of accepting the offer, the Emperor should have opened another punitive campaign to the kingdom of Champa.

=== Later reign (1158–1175) ===
After the death of Đỗ Anh Vũ, Lý Anh Tông ruled the country with the assistance of the prominent official Tô Hiến Thành. It was Tô Hiến Thành who successfully pacified the revolt of the Ngưu Hống and Ai Lao forces on the western border in 1159, and he had another victory against the Champa army in 1167, which stabilized the southern border. Originally holding only military positions in the royal court, Tô Hiến Thành not only helped the Emperor to improve the quality of the Lý army, but he also paid attention to the development of Confucian learning in the country. On the advice of Tô Hiến Thành, Lý Anh Tông established the first temple of Confucius in Thăng Long in 1156, formerly Confucius was jointly worshipped in the Temple of Literature, Hanoi.

In 1174, the relationship between the Lý dynasty and the Song dynasty significantly changed when the Emperor Xiaozong of Song decided to acknowledge Đại Việt as the Kingdom of Annam (An Nam quốc), which had been formerly designated the District of Giao Chỉ (Giao Chỉ quận), by his predecessors. Thereafter the Song dynasty formally recognized the ruler of Đại Việt as a king (Quốc vương) instead of a district prince (Quận vương). Vân Đồn The principal port of trade between Đại Việt and China was also opened in 1149 by order of Lý Anh Tông.

Lý Anh Tông died in the seventh month of 1175 at the age of 39. Before his death, the emperor entrusted Tô Hiến Thành with the regency of his 3-year-old crown prince, despite efforts from the empress to supply another prince for the throne. This final act by Lý Anh Tông was appreciated by the historian Ngô Sĩ Liên as the right decision to maintain the order of succession for the royal family and royal court.

== Family ==
The first son of Lý Anh Tông, the Prince Hiển Trung (Hiển Trung vương) Lý Long Xưởng, was born in the eleventh month of 1151. He was made crown prince of the Lý dynasty but was stripped of all titles and imprisoned in the ninth month of 1174 after Lý Anh Tông discovered that his son had committed adultery with a concubine in the royal palace. As a result, the position of successor was changed to the second son Lý Long Trát, who was born on the 25th day of the fifth month in 1173.

Lý Anh Tông House of Lý Born: 1136 Died: 1175
Regnal titles
Preceded by Lý Thần Tông	Emperor of the Lý dynasty 1138–1175	Succeeded by Lý Cao Tông
