= Ỷ Lan =

- Empress Mother Linh Nhơn
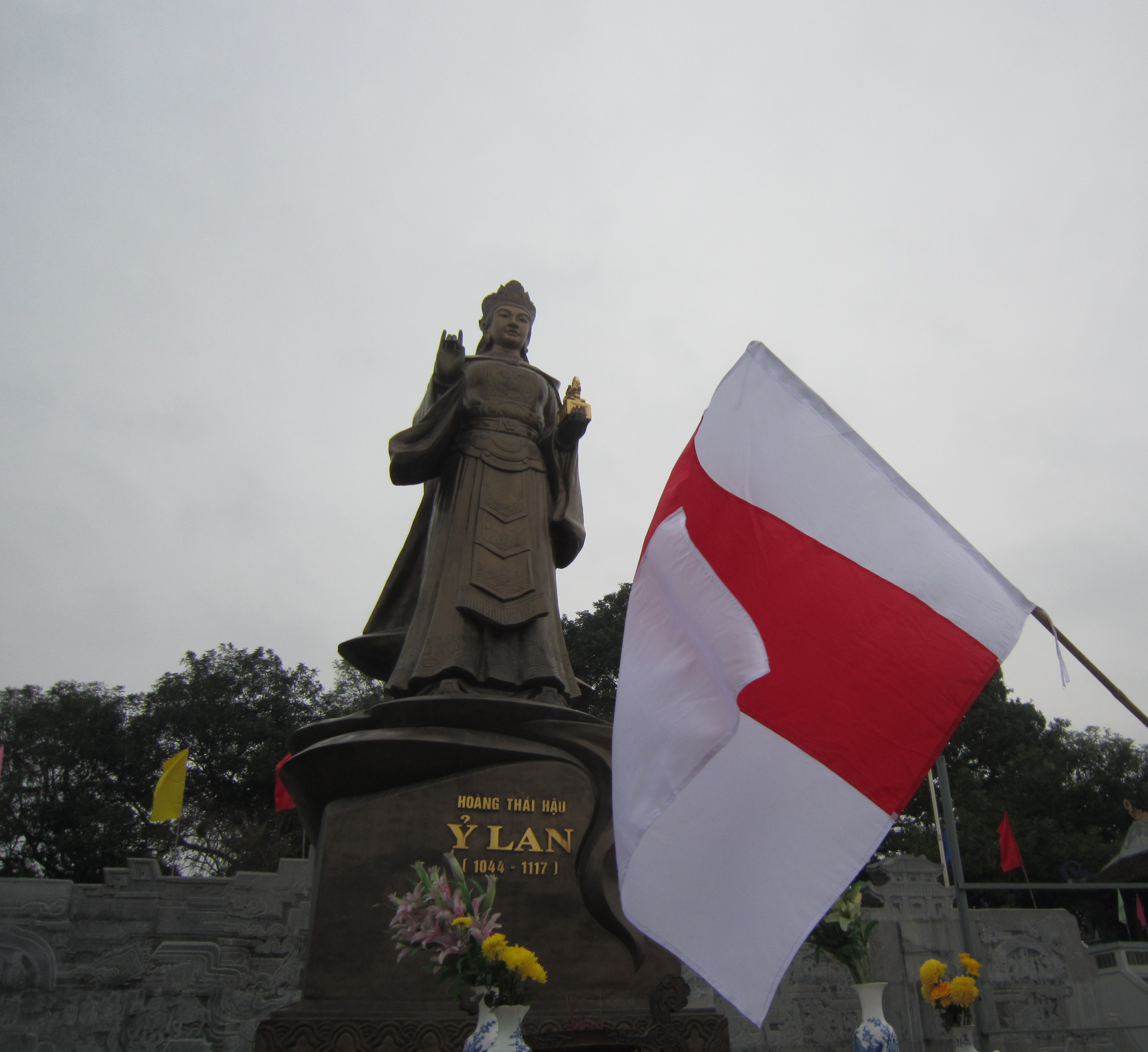

Empress mother of the Lý dynasty
- Tenure: 1073–1117
- Predecessor: Empress Mother Thượng Dương
- Successor: Empress Mother Trần Anh
- Born: Thổ Lỗi (now Gia Lâm), An Nam
- Died: 1117; Thăng Long (now Hanoi), An Nam
- Burial: Thọ Tomb
- Spouse: Lý Thánh Tông (1063–1072, his death)
- Issue: Lý Nhân Tông; Minh Nhân vương
Posthumous name
- Phù Thánh Linh Nhơn Imperial Empress-Mother (扶聖靈仁皇太后)
- House: Lý Dynasty
- Father: Nguyễn thái công
- Mother: Chu phu nhân
- Religion: Buddhism

Ỷ Lan (chữ Hán: 倚蘭, lit: leaning on the orchid, 1044–1117) or Empress Mother Linh Nhơn (Vietnamese: Linh Nhơn hoàng thái hậu, chữ Hán: 靈仁太后) was a Vietnamese concubine and regent who effectively controlled the imperial government of the Lý dynasty for over 40 years.

== Background ==
As the concubine of Lý Thánh Tông, the third emperor of the Lý dynasty, she is the mother of Lý Nhân Tông, the fourth emperor. Ỷ Lan twice served as regent, first during the absence of her spouse from 1066 to 1068, and then as co-regent during the reign of her son from 1073 until her death in 1117.

Being of commoner origin, Ỷ Lan was favoured by Lý Thánh Tông because she not only gave birth to his first child but also successfully acted the regency for him during his military campaign in Champa. After the death of the Emperor Lý Thánh Tông, Ỷ Lan conspired with General Lý Thường Kiệt to murder the Empress Mother Thượng Dương and took over the regency, making her a controversial figure in Vietnamese history.

Ỷ Lan is considered one of the most important figures of the early Lý era, being credited with driving the country's economic prosperity and political stability, in addition to her contributions to promoting Buddhism in Vietnam. One of the few women who held significant political power during the dynastic period of Vietnamese history, Ỷ Lan has been worshipped as a goddess while streets in cities across Vietnam have been named after her.

== Biography ==
=== During Lý Thánh Tông's reign ===
According to Từ điển Bách khoa toàn thư Việt Nam, the birthyear of Ỷ Lan was unknown, she was born in the Thổ Lỗi (later changed to Siêu Loại) village, now Dương Xá commune, Gia Lam, Hanoi. It was said that the Emperor Lý Thánh Tông was unable to have his own child up to the age of 40, therefore he paid visit to Buddhist pagodas all over the country to pray for a child, naturally the escort of Lý Thánh Tông often attracted attention of people.

In 1063, the emperor passed the Thổ Lỗi village where he saw a girl of commoner origin leaning on an orchid tree (Vietnamese: ỷ lan) and paid no curiosity to the escort of the emperor like others, afterwards Lý Thánh Tông decided to choose the girl as his concubine with the title Lady Ỷ Lan (Ỷ Lan phu nhân).

On 25th of the first month in 1066, Lady Ỷ Lan gave birth to Lý Càn Đức, the first child of Lý Thánh Tông. Right after the birth, Lý Càn Đức was entitled crown prince of the Lý dynasty while Lady Ỷ Lan was granted the title Imperial Concubine (Nguyên phi or Thần phi). To celebrate the event that lifted the emperor's constraint of dying without issue, Lý Thánh Tông changed his era name from Chương Thánh Gia Khánh (彰聖嘉慶) to Long Chương Thiên Tự (龍章天嗣) and gave out a general amnesty for prisoners. In the second month of 1068, Ỷ Lan had a second son who was later entitled Prince Minh Nhân (Minh Nhân vương).

In the second month of 1069, Lý Thánh Tông personally led a military campaign against the kingdom of Champa and left the regentship for Ỷ Lan. Ngô Sĩ Liên in Đại Việt sử ký toàn thư recounted that after an unsuccessful period of attack, the emperor wanted to abandon the campaign but in hearing the stability of the country under the regency of the imperial concubine, Lý Thánh Tông continued to carry on his campaign, finally he was able to capture the king of Champa Rudravarman IV and fifty thousand people of Champa. During that time, Ỷ Lan accomplished her regentship by bringing the harmony to Đại Việt people and propagating Buddhism in the country, therefore Ỷ Lan was called by the name "Quan Âm".

=== During Lý Nhân Tông's reign ===
In the first month of 1072, Lý Thánh Tông died and was succeeded by the crown prince Lý Càn Đức, now called Lý Nhân Tông. After his coronation, Lý Nhân Tông gave the former empress Thượng Dương the title Empress Mother (Hoàng thái hậu) while his natural mother Ỷ Lan was granted the lower title Imperial Concubine Mother (Hoàng thái phi). Because the new emperor was only six years old, Empress Mother Thượng Dương held the regency for Lý Nhân Tông while the chancellor Lý Đạo Thành took charge in the royal court.

Furious at the fact that she did not have the regentship despite being the real mother of the emperor, Ỷ Lan influenced her son to dismiss the Empress Mother Thượng Dương that ultimately resulted in the imprisonment of the Empress Mother and 76 imperial maids in the Thượng Dương palace. Later both the Empress Mother Thượng Dương and her servants were killed and buried in the tomb of Lê Thánh Tông. After the event, Ỷ Lan was entitled Empress Mother Linh Nhân and replaced the Empress Mother Thượng Dương in the position of regent for the emperor. About this event, the historian Ngô Sĩ Liên commented that although having a devotion for Buddhism, Ỷ Lan was too ruthless in killing the innocent empress mother, he also remarked that the chancellor Lý Đạo Thành was transferred to a position in the southern border likely because he advised against the act of Ỷ Lan and the emperor.

During her second regentship, Ỷ Lan continued to prove her ability in successfully ruling the country together with the chancellor Lý Đạo Thành and the commander-in-chief Lý Thường Kiệt. When Lý army led by Lý Thường Kiệt continuously operated in the border regions and Lý Đạo Thành died in 1081, it was Ỷ Lan who looked after the agriculture and developing education in Đại Việt. At that time, the first imperial examination based on Confucian learning was organized with Lê Văn Thịnh becoming the first first-rank laureate in history of imperial examination in Vietnam. In 1096 the Queen Mother consulted the monk Thông Biện regarding the history of Buddhism in Vietnam. Since Đại Việt had a long period of peace and prosperity, Ỷ Lan began her plan of spreading Buddhism in the country by order to build over one hundred pagodas. It was believed that Ỷ Lan went into Buddhism and had built pagodas because she felt regret for the death of the Empress Mother Thượng Dương and her servants. Nevertheless, she still cared about the life of her people, for example in the Spring of 1103, she granted money for poor women in the country who had to sell themselves to be wives of widowers. In the second month of 1117, Ỷ Lan brought out the law of prohibiting people from killing buffaloes, she reasoned that buffalo was essential for farming, a buffalo being killed would cause serious effect on many people, therefore the criminal of killing buffalo and his accomplice had to be heavily punished.

On 25 July 1117, with Ỷ Lan dead, she was given the posthumous name Phù thánh linh nhân hoàng thái hậu (扶聖靈仁皇太后) and was buried in the imperial tomb Thọ Lăng which was located in Thiên Đức prefect (now Từ Sơn District, Bắc Ninh), the native land of the Lý dynasty.

== Influence ==
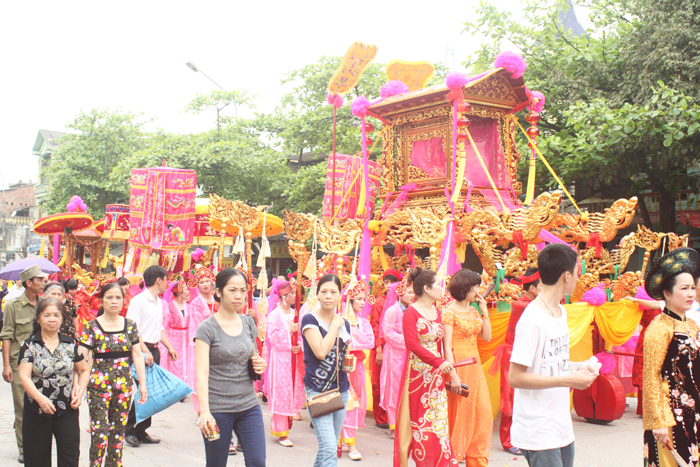
Ỷ La procession from Ỷ La Temple to Hạ Temple

There are many shrines and temples dedicated to Ỷ Lan in the northern region of Vietnam, from her village Siêu Loại to the mountainous province Tuyên Quang, a street in Gia Lam near her birthplace is also named in honour of Ỷ Lan. Each year, people in her native district Gia Lam organizes a festival to commemorate the feats of Ỷ Lan on the 3rd of the third month in lunar calendar. A bigger festival to commemorate Ỷ Lan is held in the Ghềnh Temple (Đền Ghềnh) in Văn Lâm District, Hung Yen from 5th to 16th of the third lunar month. In 1997, a national committee was established in order to select a list of distinguished women in history of Vietnam, Ỷ Lan was one of the first choices and the only representative of the list who was well known for her political activities. Besides, Ỷ Lan is also considered the first woman who taught Vietnamese the embroidery technique. In culture, Ỷ Lan is one of the main characters in the chèo play Bài ca giữ nước (The Song of Defending the Country), the most famous work of the writer Tào Mạt.

Ỷ Lan House of Lý Died: 1117
Regnal titles
Preceded by Empress Mother Thượng Dương	Empress Mother of Lý dynasty 1073–1117	Succeeded by Empress Mother Trần Anh
