= List of emperors of the Lý dynasty =

The Lý dynasty (1009–1225), founded by the Lý clan, was an imperial dynasty of Đại Việt that succeeded the Early Lê dynasty (980–1009) and preceded the Trần dynasty (1225–1400). The first emperor of the dynasty was Lý Thái Tổ (974–1028). The dynasty ended with the usurpation of throne from Lý Chiêu Hoàng (1218–1278) by Trần Thủ Độ, the head of Trần clan. Below is a complete list of emperors of the Lý dynasty, including their temple names, given names, and era names. Each name is presented in the Vietnamese alphabet and Chinese characters. Posthumous names, which were usually very long and rarely used when referring to the sovereign, are presented in last column.

== Emperors ==
Temple names (Miếu hiệu)	Birth names (Tên húy)	Birth–Death	Period of reigns	Era names (Niên hiệu)	Posthumous names (Thụy hiệu)	Ref.
Thái Tổ (太祖)	Lý Công Uẩn (李公蘊)	974–1028	1009–1028	Thuận Thiên (1010–1028)	Thần Vũ Hoàng Đế	
Thái Tông (太宗)	Lý Phật Mã (李佛瑪); Lý Đức Chính (李德政)	1000–1054	1028–1054	Thiên Thành (1028–1034); Thông Thụy (1034–1039); Càn Phù Hữu Đạo (1039–1042); Minh Đạo (1042–1044); Thiên Cảm Thánh Vũ (1044–1049); Sùng Hưng Đại Bảo (1049–1054)	Đại Hành Hoàng Đế	
Thánh Tông (聖宗)	Lý Nhật Tôn (李日尊)	1023–1072	1054–1072	Long Thụy Thái Bình (1054–1058); Chương Thánh Gia Khánh (1059–1065); Long Chương Thiên Tự (1066–1068); Thiên Thống Bảo Tượng (1068–1069); Thần Vũ (1069–1072)	Ứng Thiên Sùng Nhân Chí Đạo Uy Khánh Long Tường Minh Văn Duệ Vũ Hiếu Đức Thánh Thần Hoàng Đế	
Nhân Tông (仁宗)	Lý Càn Đức (李乾德)	1066–1127	1072–1127	Thái Ninh (1072–1076); Anh Vũ Chiêu Thắng (1076–1084); Quảng Hựu (1085–1092); Hội Phong (1092–1100); Long Phù (1101–1109); Hội Tường Đại Khánh (1110–1119); Thiên Phù Duệ Vũ (1120–1126); Thiên Phù Khánh Thọ (1127)	Hiếu Từ Thánh Thần Văn Vũ Hoàng Đế	
Thần Tông (神宗)	Lý Dương Hoán (李陽煥)	1116–1138	1128–1138	Thiên Thuận (1128–1132); Thiên Chương Bảo Tự (1133–1138)	Quảng Nhân Sùng Hiếu Văn Vũ Hoàng Đế	
Anh Tông (英宗)	Lý Thiên Tộ (李天祚)	1136–1175	1138–1175	Thiệu Minh (1138–1140); Đại Định (1140–1162); Chí Long Bảo Ứng (1163–1174); Thiên Cảm Chí Bảo (1174–1175)		
Cao Tông (高宗)	Lý Long Trát or Lý Long Cán (李龍翰)	1173–1210	1175–1210	Trinh Phù (1176–1186); Thiên Tư Gia Thụy (1186–1202); Thiên Gia Bảo Hựu (1202–1204); Trị Bình Long Ứng (1204–1210)		
Huệ Tông^{A} (惠宗)	Lý (Hạo) Sảm (李旵)	1194–1226	1211–1224	Kiến Gia (1211–1224)		
Chiêu Hoàng^{B} (昭皇)	Lý Phật Kim (李佛金); Lý Thiên Hinh (李天馨)	1218–1278	1224–1225	Thiên Chương Hữu Đạo (1224–1225)		

A : Under pressure of Trần Thủ Độ, leader of Trần clan, Huệ Tông had to pass the throne to his daughter, Chiêu Thánh Princess, and became a Buddhist priest. After the Trần clan overthrew Lý clan to become the reigning force, Huệ Tông was obliged to commit suicide after Trần Thủ Độ's advice.
B : The only woman in the feudal history of Vietnam to assume the title of Empress Regnant. She was forced by Trần Thủ Độ, leader of Trần clan, to cede the throne to her husband, Trần Cảnh, who thereafter became Trần Thái Tông, the first emperor of Trần dynasty.

== Chronicle ==
Thái Tổ
Thái Tông
Thánh Tông
Nhân Tông	Sùng Hiền hầu
Thần Tông
Anh Tông
Cao Tông
Huệ Tông
Chiêu Hoàng

== Sources ==
- Ngô, Sỹ Liên (1993), Đại Việt sử ký toàn thư (in Vietnamese) (Nội các quan bản ed.), Hanoi: Social Science Publishing House
- National Bureau for Historical Record (1998), Khâm định Việt sử Thông giám cương mục (in Vietnamese), Hanoi: Education Publishing House
