= Lý Nhân Tông =

Vietnamese emperor (1066–1128)

Lý Nhân Tông 李仁宗
- Emperor of Đại Việt
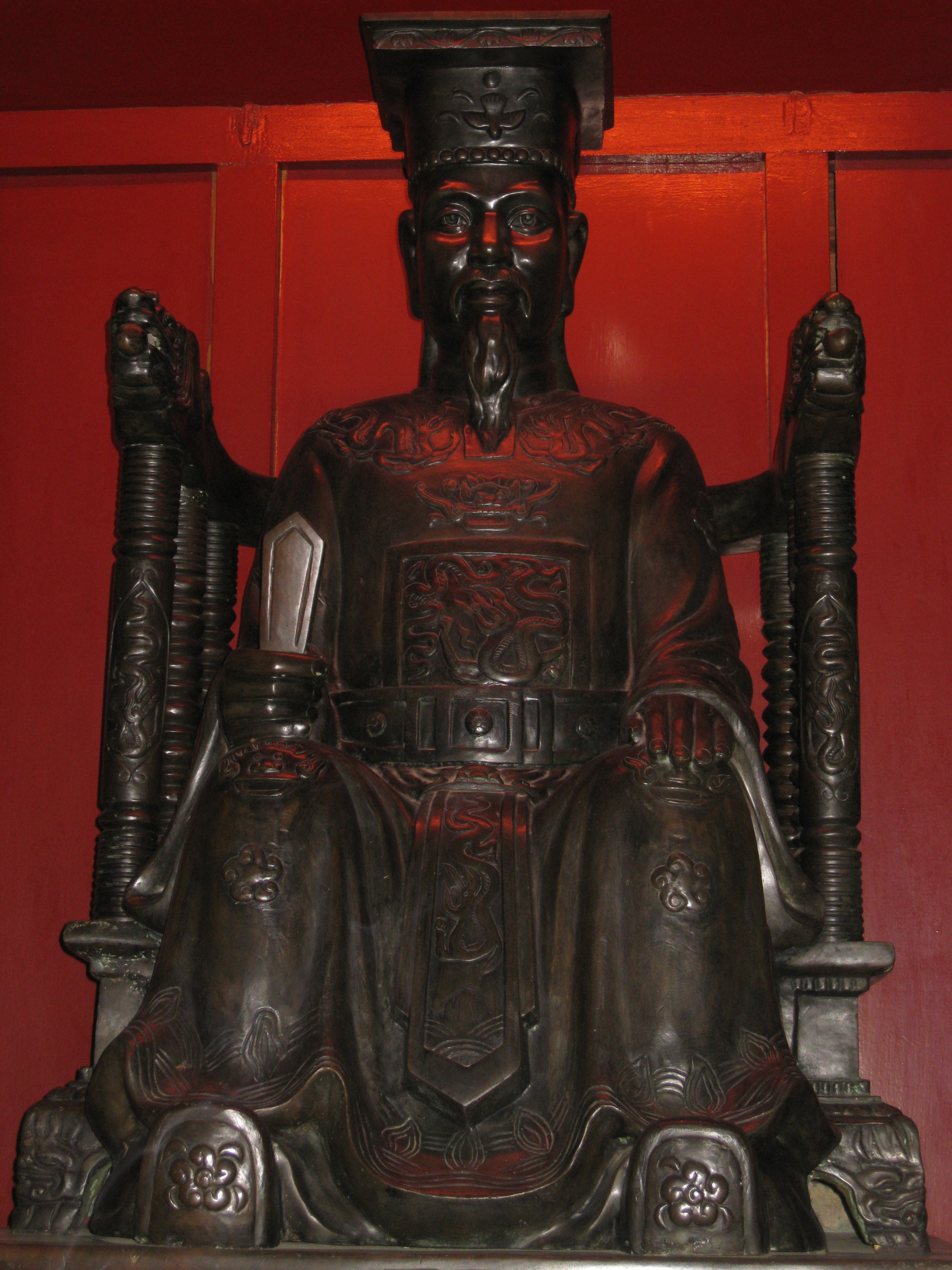
- A statue of emperor Lý Nhân Tông

Emperor of Đại Việt
- Reign: 3 February 1072 – 15 January 1128
- Predecessor: Lý Thánh Tông
- Successor: Lý Thần Tông

Emperor of Lý dynasty
- Reign: 1072–1128
- Predecessor: Lý Thánh Tông
- Successor: Lý Thần Tông
- Born: Lý Nhật Tôn; 22 February 1066; Long Đức palace, Thăng Long
- Died: 15 January 1128 (aged 62); Vĩnh Quang palace, Thăng Long
- Burial: Thọ Tomb
- Spouse: Empress Lan Anh (蘭英皇后); Empress Khâm Thiên (欽天皇后); Empress Chấn Bảo (震寶皇后); Empress Thánh Cực (聖極皇后, ?–1095); Empress Chiêu Thánh (昭聖皇后. ?–1108).
- Issue: Prince Lý Dương Hoán(adoptive); Prince Lý Dương Côn(adoptive)
Names
- Lý Càn Đức (李乾德)
Era dates
- Thái Ninh (1072–1076); Anh Vũ Chiêu Thắng (1076–1084); Quảng Hựu (1085–1092); Hội Phong (1092–1100); Long Phù (1101–1109); Hội Tường Đại Khánh (1110–1119); Thiên Phù Duệ Vũ (1120–1126); Thiên Phù Khánh Thọ (1127).
Regnal name
- Hiếu Thiên Thể Đạo Thánh Văn Thần Vũ Sùng Nhân Ý Nghĩa Hiếu Từ Thuần Thành Minh Hiếu Hoàng Đế (憲天體道聖文神武崇仁懿義孝慈純誠明孝皇帝)
Posthumous name
- Hiếu Từ Thánh Thần Văn Vũ Hoàng Đế (孝慈聖神文武皇帝)
Temple name
- Nhân Tông (仁宗)
- House: Lý
- Father: Lý Thánh Tông
- Mother: Empress Ỷ Lan
- Religion: Buddhism

- Lý Nhân Tông
- Vietnamese: Posthumous name
- Chữ Hán: 李仁宗

- Personal name
- Vietnamese alphabet: Lý Càn Đức
- Chữ Hán: 李乾德

Lý Nhân Tông (22 February 1066 – 15 January 1128), personal name Lý Càn Đức, temple name Nhân Tông was the fourth emperor of the Lý dynasty, ruling the empire of Đại Việt from 1072 until his death in 1128. Succeeding his father Lý Thánh Tông at the age of 7, during his early reign Lý Nhân Tông ruled with the assistance of his mother Ỷ Lan and the chancellor Lý Đạo Thành who were both considered competent regents and were able to help the emperor maintain the country's prosperity. Appreciated as a great emperor of the Lý dynasty, Lý Nhân Tông made important contributions to the development of Đại Việt, especially for establishing Confucianism as the official philosophy of the state, creating Confucian-based imperial exams, and creating schools based on the Confucian system of learning. During his 56-year reign, which was the longest reign for any Vietnamese monarch, Lý Nhân Tông also experienced several wars against Đại Việt's neighbours, the Song dynasty and the kingdom of Champa in which the Sino–Vietnamese War (1075–1076) was the fiercest. After his death, the royal family lost their control over the court to the chancellors and the bureaucracies.

== Early life ==
Lý Càn Đức (李乾德) was born in the first month of the lunar calendar in 1066 as the first son of the emperor Lý Thánh Tông and his concubine Ỷ Lan. It was said that Lý Thánh Tông was unable to have his own son up to the age of 40, so he paid a visit to Buddhist pagodas all over the country to pray for a child. Therefore, right after the birth, Lý Càn Đức was entitled crown prince of the Lý dynasty while Lady Ỷ Lan was granted the title Imperial Concubine. To celebrate the event that lifted the emperor's constraint of dying without issue, Lý Thánh Tông changed his era name from Chương Thánh Gia Khánh (彰聖嘉慶) to Long Chương Thiên Tự (龍章天嗣) and gave out a general amnesty for prisoners.

In the first month of the lunar calendar in 1072, his father, the emperor Thánh Tông died and thus the crown prince Lý Càn Đức succeed the throne at the age of 7. The emperor changed the era name to Thái Ninh (1072–1076), during his reign Lý Nhân Tông had seven more era names which are Anh Vũ Chiêu Thắng (1076–1084), Quảng Hựu (1085–1092), Hội Phong (1092–1100), Long Phù (1101–1109), Hội Tường Đại Khánh (1110–1119), Thiên Phù Duệ Vũ (1120–1126) and Thiên Phù Khánh Thọ (1127–1127).

== As emperor ==
=== Early years ===
Initially, the question of who was to be regent for the young emperor was awarded to the chancellor (Vietnamese: thái sư) Lý Đạo Thành and the Empress Mother Thượng Dương, but she was soon dismissed by Lý Nhân Tông after the influence from the emperor's natural mother Ỷ Lan. Later the Empress Mother Thượng Dương and her 76 imperial maids were imprisoned in the Thượng Dương palace; they ultimately were killed and buried in the tomb of Lê Thánh Tông.

After the Empress Mother's assassination, Ỷ Lan was entitled Empress Mother Linh Nhân and replaced the Empress Mother Thượng Dương in the position of regent for the emperor. Concerning the death of the previous empress mother, the historian Ngô Sĩ Liên commented that "although having a devotion to Buddhism, Ỷ Lan was too ruthless in killing the innocent empress mother, and also remarked that the chancellor Lý Đạo Thành was transferred to a position in the southern border likely because he advised against Ỷ Lan's murder of Thượng Dương.

Once Ỷ Lan became regent on behalf of Lý Thánh Tông during his military campaign in Champa, she continued to prove her ability in successfully assisting the emperor in ruling the country, together with the chancellor Lý Đạo Thành and the commander-in-chief Lý Thường Kiệt. In the second month of 1117, following Ỷ Lan's advice, Lý Nhân Tông issued an edict prohibiting people from killing buffaloes, reasoning that since buffalo were essential for farming, the death of buffalo would seriously affect many people who depended on the crops that were tilled by the now-dead buffalo; therefore, a criminal accused of killing buffalo and the occasional accomplice had to be heavily punished. The chancellor Lý Đạo Thành was also famous for his competence and righteousness that helped the young emperor Nhân Tông to maintain the prosperity of the country and the strength of the Lý army.

Lý Nhân Tông's reign is highly applauded, above all in national education. Following the emperor's order, the first imperial examination of the Vietnamese monarch based on Confucian learning was organized in the second month in 1072 with Lê Văn Thịnh becoming the first first-rank laureate in the history of imperial examinations in Vietnam. Afterwards Lê Văn Thịnh was promoted to the position of chancellor in 1086. However the new Chancellor soon lost his position in 1096 after a controversial case of treason, was stripped of all titles, and banished. Besides Lê Văn Thịnh, Mạc Hiển Tích was also a capable official who found his way to the royal court from the Confucian learning that was continuously being developed by the emperor, especially after his decree establishing the first school for Confucian students in Đại Việt, Quốc tử giám (國子監, National Academy), in 1076. In 1089 Lý Nhân Tông made another important decision when he reformed the ranking of officials in the royal court and in the country. To protect the capital Thăng Long against floods, Lý Nhân Tông initiated the construction of the Cổ Xá Dike, one of the first dike systems in Đại Việt.

=== Conflicts with neighbours ===
Relations between the kingdom of Đại Việt and the Song Empire began to deteriorate when the Song chancellor Wang Anshi brought out his reforms in 1069. In the late 1060s, Wang Anshi's New Policies and the prevalent sentiment of irredentism in Shenzong's court led to new ways of governing. Wang's policies saw each part of society as part of a greater whole, and thus the state must take a more holistic and all-encompassing part in governance. One of Wang's reforms, the Balanced Delivery Law, called on fiscal intendants in six of the southern circuits to disregard quotas on tribute items and to buy and sell items according to prices on the open market. Loyal supporters were sought out to assist in the extraction of these resources. Lý Thường Kiệt viewed the changing economic relationship between the Song and its frontier people as an abandonment of the traditional tribute paradigm. Wang called for military action from Song imperial troops. King Lý Nhân Tông decided to stay one step ahead by ordering the generals Lý Thường Kiệt and Tôn Đản to launch a military campaign under the pretext of "rescuing Chinese people from the cruel reforms." In 1075, the Vietnamese army led by Lý Thường Kiệt attacked the Lian and Qin provinces of Song China while another army led by Tôn Đản besieged the citadel of Yongzhou. Although Lý Thường Kiệt succeeded in defeating the Song reinforcements intended for Yongzhou, the Song army and people in the city were still able to stand the besiegement for 40 days and inflicted high casualties on the Vietnamese forces. As a result, when the Vietnamese army finally ended the siege of Yongzhou, the Vietnamese generals decided to get revenge by killing more than 58,000 people in the city. Several sources estimate that the total number of people killed by Viet troops during this campaign totaled 100,000. In response to the sudden attack, the Song emperor began an invasion of Đại Việt in the twelfth month of 1076 with the support of the Song's vassal kingdoms, Champa and the Khmer. After an initial, rapid advance, the Song forces were stopped by the Vietnamese defense along the Như Nguyệt River led by Lý Thường Kiệt. In avoiding this strong defence system, the commander of the Song army decided to change the army's direction towards the nearby region of Phú Lương, where they defeated Lý Thường Kiệt's forces in a major battle. As the Song forces took the offensive, while Đại Việt had to strenuously hold on to their costly defensive front, Lý Thường Kiệt tried to boost the morale of his soldiers by a poem named Nam quốc sơn hà. Afterwards this poem was considered the first Declarations of independence of Vietnam. Being aware of the unfavourable situation of the Viet army, Lý Nhân Tông finally decided to propose a cease-fire which was accepted by the Song dynasty since they had lost 400,000 men to battles and the harsh weather of Đại Việt. The Song army retreated after occupying a vast region near the border between the two countries; however, this region was gradually returned to the Đại Việt after several diplomatic efforts made by the Vietnamese envoys Đào Tôn Nguyên and Lê Văn Thịnh.

In the south, hostilities soon flared between Đại Việt and Champa. Appointed for the position of commander-in-chief of the Vietnamese army by Lý Nhân Tông, Lý Thường Kiệt often personally commanded operations in the southern border where he defeated the army of Champa several times with the last victory in 1104, only one year before his death in 1105. The success of Lý Thường Kiệt during his military campaigns against the kingdom of Champa helped Lý Nhân Tông to stabilize the southern region for the later years of his reign.

== Family ==
Although Lý Nhân Tông had three empresses, Lan Anh, Khâm Thiên and Chấn Bảo, he was unable to have his own son; thus, the emperor decided to adopt sons of the Marquises Sùng Hiền, Thành Khánh, Thành Quảng, Thành Chiêu, Thành Hưng, so that the emperor could choose a capable successor to maintain the throne for the Lý dynasty. Finally, being an intelligent and vivacious boy, Marquis Sùng Hiền's son Lý Dương Hoán was made the crown prince at the age of 2 in 1117. In December 1127 after a 56-year reign, Lý Nhân Tông died at Vĩnh Quang Palace at the age of 61 and was succeeded by Lý Dương Hoán, now the emperor Lý Thần Tông. In his last will, Lý Nhân Tông still expressed his concern for the country and only wished for a prosperous nation (bốn bể yên vui) and a stable frontier (biên thuỳ ít loạn).

- Parents
  - Lý Nhật Tôn (1023 – 1072)
  - Lady Ỷ Lan (倚蘭, 1044 – 1117)
- Wives
  - Empress Lan Anh (蘭英皇后)
  - Empress Khâm Thiên (欽天皇后)
  - Empress Chấn Bảo (震寶皇后)
  - Empress Thánh Cực (聖極皇后 ? – 1095)
  - Empress Chiêu Thánh (昭聖皇后 ? – 1108).
- Children (Adoptives)
  - Lý Dương Hoán (1116 – 1138), son of Nhân Tông brother's Sùng Hiền hầu
  - Lý Dương Côn (李陽焜), went exiled in Goryeo Korea in 1127, after being captive in Kaifeng, Song China by the Jurchen Jin dynasty's army

== Legacy ==
The 55-year rule of Lý Nhân Tông is the longest reign in the history of Vietnamese monarchs. For his contributions, Lý Nhân Tông is still considered a great emperor of the Lý dynasty, credited with solidifying the Lý dynasty's rule in Vietnam and stabilizing the country for future Lý emperors. During his 55 years of rule, Lý Nhân Tông not only cultivated the agriculture and military strength of Đại Việt, but also established a national education for Confucian learning with the establishment of the first imperial examinations and the first imperial school for Confucian learning in Thăng Long which is still preserved today. Besides these accomplishments, Lý Nhân Tông is well known for his talent in writing poetry with three poems that still remain, Tán Giác Hải thiền sư, Thông Huyền đạo nhân, Truy tán Vạn Hạnh thiền sư and Lâm chung di chiếu. To commemorate the successful reign of Lý Nhân Tông, a stele was erected in 1121 with the content composed by the minister of justice Nguyễn Công Bật. Called Sùng Thiện Diên Linh Stele, this work still stands today and is considered one of the most important steles in the History of Vietnam.

Lý Nhân Tông House of Lý Born: 1066 Died: 1127
Regnal titles
| Preceded by Lý Thánh Tông | Emperor of the Lý dynasty 1072–1127 | Succeeded by Lý Thần Tông |
