= Dan Koehl =

French-Swedish zookeeper, elephant trainer (born 1959)

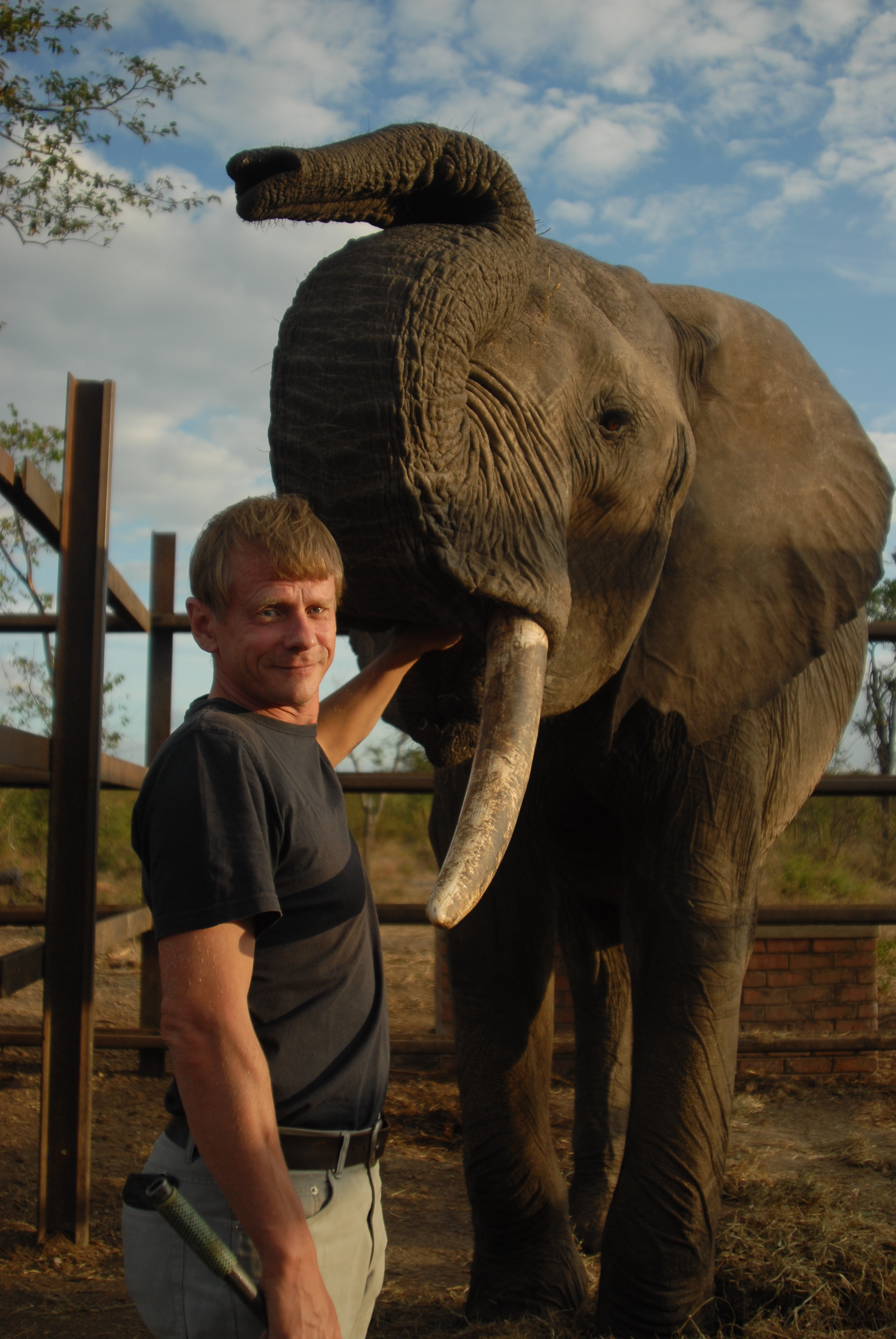
- Dan Koehl and African savanna elephant bull "Bonniface" at Elephant Experience, Victoria Falls, Zimbabwe (2005)
- Born: Dan Albert John Köhl; October 28, 1959 (age 66); Stockholm, Sweden
- Occupation: Elephant trainer
- Known for: Royal headgroom Elephant Encyclopedia
- Relatives: Albert Köhl (grandfather); Birger Nordholm (grandfather); Friedrichs Lachs (second great-grandfather Alice Rasmussen (aunt); John Nordlander (granduncle); Edouard Dieffenbach (first cousin once removed)

Dan Albert John Koehl (born 28 October 1959) is a French-Swedish zookeeper, elephant trainer, and stablemaster. An author of the Elephant Encyclopedia, he has been described as "one of Europe's most renowned experts on elephants".

== Early years ==
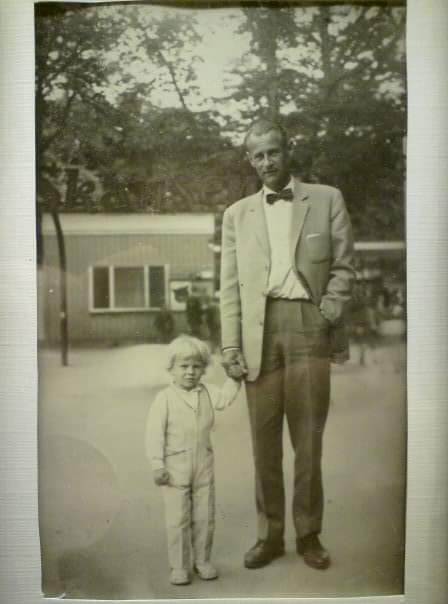
Dan Koehl with father Gösta Köhl outside Skansen Zoo, Stockholm (1964)

Dan Koehl was born 28 October 1959 in Stockholm, Sweden, the fifth child of parents Gösta Köhl (1916–1996), Swedish engineer and Margot Nordholm (1922–2006).

Koehl grew up in Mountain View, California, United States, and on Östermalm in Stockholm. He studied zookeeping at Enskede gårds gymnasium, besides higher education at Stockholm University and Calle Flygare Teaterskola. Koehl began his career in aquarium and zoo-shops, and as commissioned shepherd for the Royal Herd of Sheep at Gärdet in Stockholm. He carried out apprenticeship as elephant-keeper at Circus Scott in Stockholm under elephant trainer Banda Vidane, as mahout in Sri Lanka and India, and in traditional German elephant management at Hanover Zoo and Tierpark Hagenbeck in Hamburg, Germany, by elephant chief trainer Karl Kock.

== Professional career ==
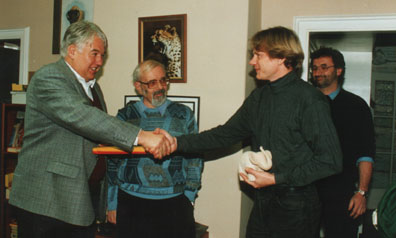
Dan Koehl with Director Dr Helmut Pechlaner and Curator Dr Kurt Kolar at Tiergarten Schönbrunn, Austria (1998)

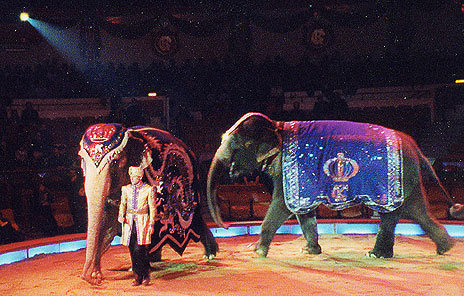
Dan Koehl in maharaja clothing at Cirkus Krone, Germany (2001)

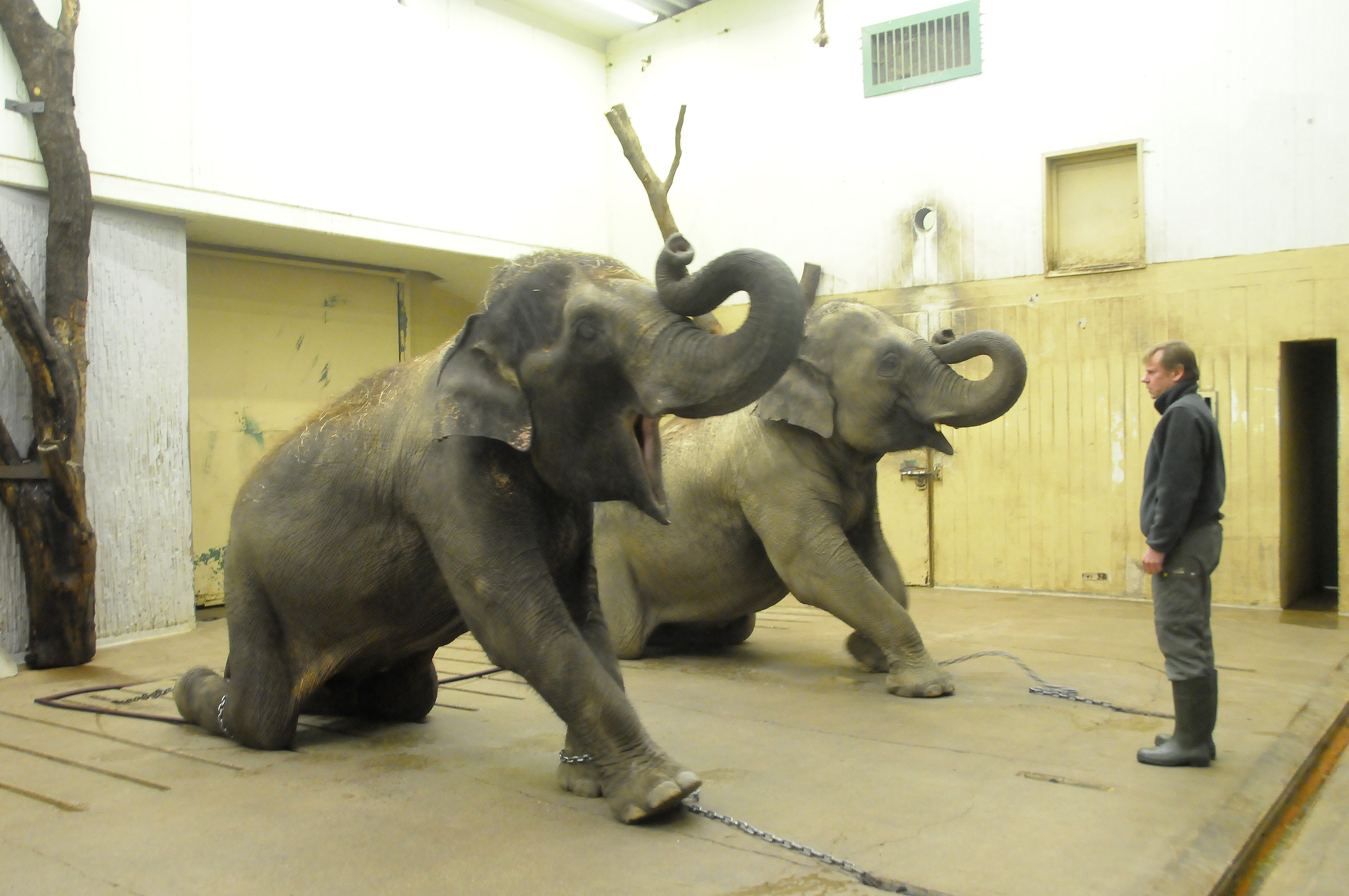
Dan Koehl with elephants "Saonoi" and "Bua", donated to King Carl XVI Gustaf of Sweden by King Bhumibol Adulyadej of Thailand, in Kolmården Wildlife Park (2008)

Since the late 1970s, Dan Koehl has served as head elephant keeper, stable master (equerry) and consultant at zoos, circuses and ranches around the world. European locations have included Skansen, Cirkus Scott, Hellabrunn Zoo (Munich), Borås Wildlife Park, Tiergarten Schönbrunn, Dresden Zoo, Zoolandia. Parco Natura Viva, Kolmården Wildlife Park, Circus Krone, Tiergarten Walding, Karlsruhe Zoo and Prague Zoo. While at Skansen, pending the departure of the stable's elephants "Nika" and "Shiva" to inferior living conditions abroad, he figured in a campaign that sparked nationwide debate over "Stockholm's beloved elephants". Despite described by Cynthia Moss in Elephant Memories as "among the best-cared-for and happiest I had ever seen in captivity", after much controversy, Skansen's elephants were shipped to Cricket Park, England, only to face premature death.

At Tiergarten Schönbrunn in Vienna 1998, Koehl assisted Director Dr Helmut Pechlaner in elephants retraining and staff management when the zoo was induced to establish a new team of elephant keepers, facing a critical campaign concerning its keeping of elephants. Likewise he assisted Director Dr Herbert Lücker with elephant training and staff coaching in Dresden Zoo 1999, when the zoo was under criticism by members of animal rights organisations.

At Kolmården Wildlife Park, Koehl was commissioned "royal head groom" for the management of the elephants "Boa" and "Saonoi" donated to King Carl XVI Gustaf of Sweden by King Bhumibol Adulyadej of Thailand. Since the 1990s worldwide locations have included Elephant Experience and Sondelani Game Lodge in Zimbabwe, Pinnawala Elephant Orphanage in Sri Lanka, and Airavata Elephant Foundation and the elephant Sanctuary Kulen Elephant Forest, both latter ones in Cambodia.

Dan Koehl has contributed to various animals and wildlife care and preservation foundations related especially to elephants, including Asian elephant victims of war at Pinnawala Elephant Orphanage. and has since early nineties been a contributing Professional member to the Elephant Managers Association, as Deputy of the Executive Secretary for the European Elephant Keepers and Managers Association (EEKMA) 1998–2008, he co-worked out the Elephant management safety guidelines (2002). Koehl has served as board of director for Elefanten-Schutz Europa, as chairperson for the Swedish organisation Defend the elephants and the Swedish National Union of Aquaristic Societies (SARF), and as Web developer created websites for enterprises like Tropicarium Kolmården, and ImageWare Austria. Since 2023 he is advisor to leaders in elephant venue auditing, Asian Captive Elephant Standards (ACES), as part of a program coordinated by Deutsche Gesellschaft für Internationale Zusammenarbeit (GIZ) and the Pacific Asia Travel Association.

Koehl has resided in Siem Reap, Cambodia and was between 2019 and end of 2024, responsible for care and management of elephants and mahouts as elephant trainer, manager, and welfare director at Kulen Elephant Forest.

He founded the Elephant Encyclopedia in 1995, one of the first online encyclopedias in the world.
