= Lachs =

Lachs (German for "salmon") is a surname. Notable people with the surname include:

- Charles Lachs (1879-1979), Bavarian-Swedish visual artist
- Charlotta Lachs (1867-1920), Bavarian-Swedish singer
- Friedrich Lachs (1832-1910), Bavarian-Swedish brewmaster
- John Lachs (born 1934), American academic
- Manfred Lachs (1914–1993), Polish diplomat and jurist
- Minna Lachs (1907–1993), Austrian educator and memoirist
- Stephen Lachs (born 1939), American judge

== See also ==
- Lach (disambiguation)
- Lox, a fillet of brined salmon.
