= Austroasiatic crossbow =

Weapon used in Southeast Asia

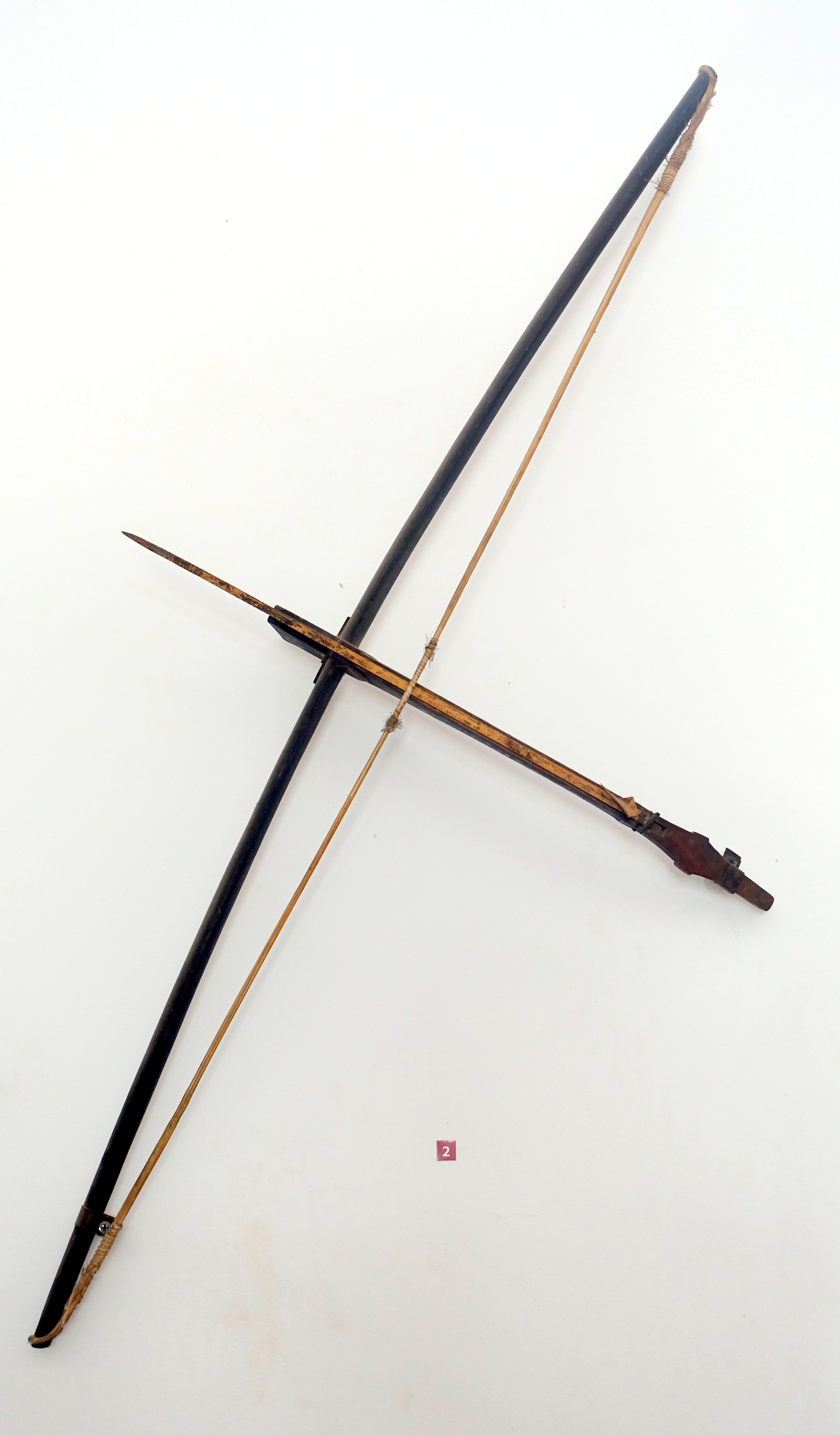
- Crossbow, Hre - Vietnam Museum of Ethnology - Hanoi, Vietnam
- Type: Crossbow
- Culture: Angkorian civilization Cham civilization Bahnar people Hmong people

The Austroasiatic crossbow which is also known as the Hmong crossbow, the Jarai crossbow, or the Angkorian crossbow is a crossbow used for war and for hunting in Southeastern Asia. It has become a symbol of pride and identity for ethnic groups from Myanmar (Burma) to the confines of Indochina.

== Terminology ==
The Austroasiatic crossbow is known as sna in Khmer, chrao in Brao hneev in Hmong, or hraŏ in Jarai.

It is one of the few Austroasiatic loanwords found in Sino-Tibetan languages as linguists have found it to be related to the Chinese crossbow known as nu (弩) : "the Southern origin of this term is indisputable but the origin of the term is uncertain".

== History ==
=== Origins and Ongoing Debate ===
While the majority opinion is that the crossbow was of Chinese origin, there is another theory pointing towards an independent Southeast Asian origin for the crossbow based on the aforementioned linguistic evidence:

Throughout the southeastern Asia the crossbow is still used by primitive and tribal peoples both for hunting and war, from the Assamese mountains through Burma, Siam and to the confines of Indo-China. The peoples of the northeastern Asia possess it also, both as weapon and toy, but use it mainly in the form of unattended traps; this is true of the Yakut, Tungus, and Chukchi, even of the Ainu in the east. There seems to be no way of answering the question whether it first arose among the barbaric forefathers of these Asian peoples before the rise of the Chinese culture in their midst, and then underwent its technical development only therein, or whether it spread outwards from China to all the environing peoples. The former seems the more probable hypothesis, given the further linguistic evidence in its support.

Around 200 BC, King An Dương Vương of Âu Lạc (modern-day northern Vietnam) and (modern-day southern China) commissioned a man named Cao Lỗ (or Cao Thông) to construct a "magic crossbow" (nỏ thần), one shot from which could fire 300 arrows. According to historian Keith Taylor, the crossbow could have been introduced into China from Austroasiatic peoples in the south around the 4th century BC. However, this is contradicted by crossbow trigger locks found in Zhou dynasty tombs dating earlier to the 7th century BC, as well as the mass production and widespread use of crossbows in China during the Warring States period dating earlier to the 5th century BC.

In 315 AD, Nu Wen from China taught the Chams how to build fortifications and use handheld crossbows. The Chinese would later give crossbows as presents to the Cham on at least one occasion.

Siege crossbows were transmitted to the Chams by Zhi Yangjun from the Song dynasty, who was shipwrecked on their coast in 1172. He remained there and taught them mounted archery and how to use siege crossbows. In 1177, crossbows were used by Champa in their invasion and sacking of Angkor, the Khmer Empire's capital.

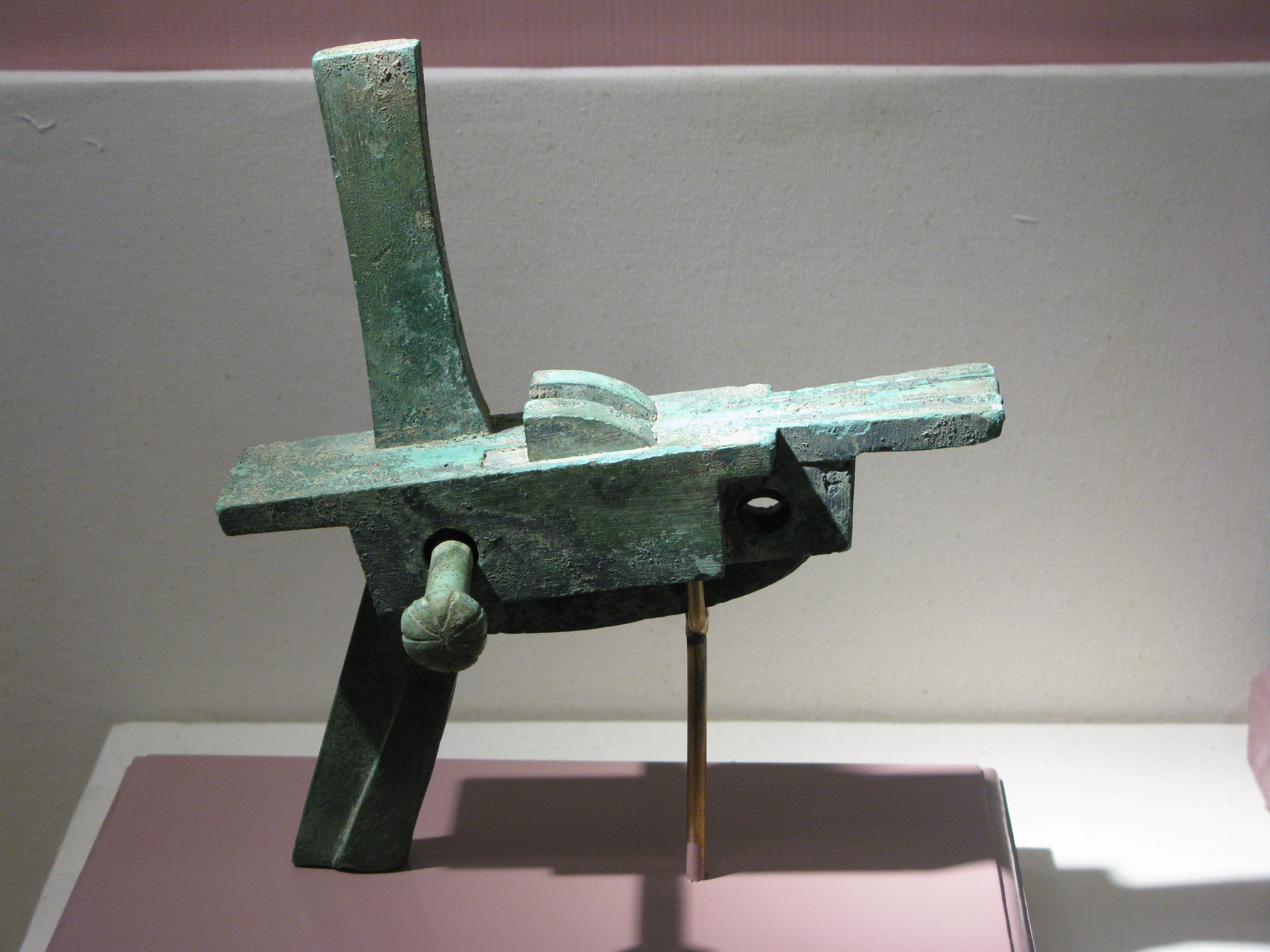
Dong Son culture bronze crossbow, 500 BCE – 0

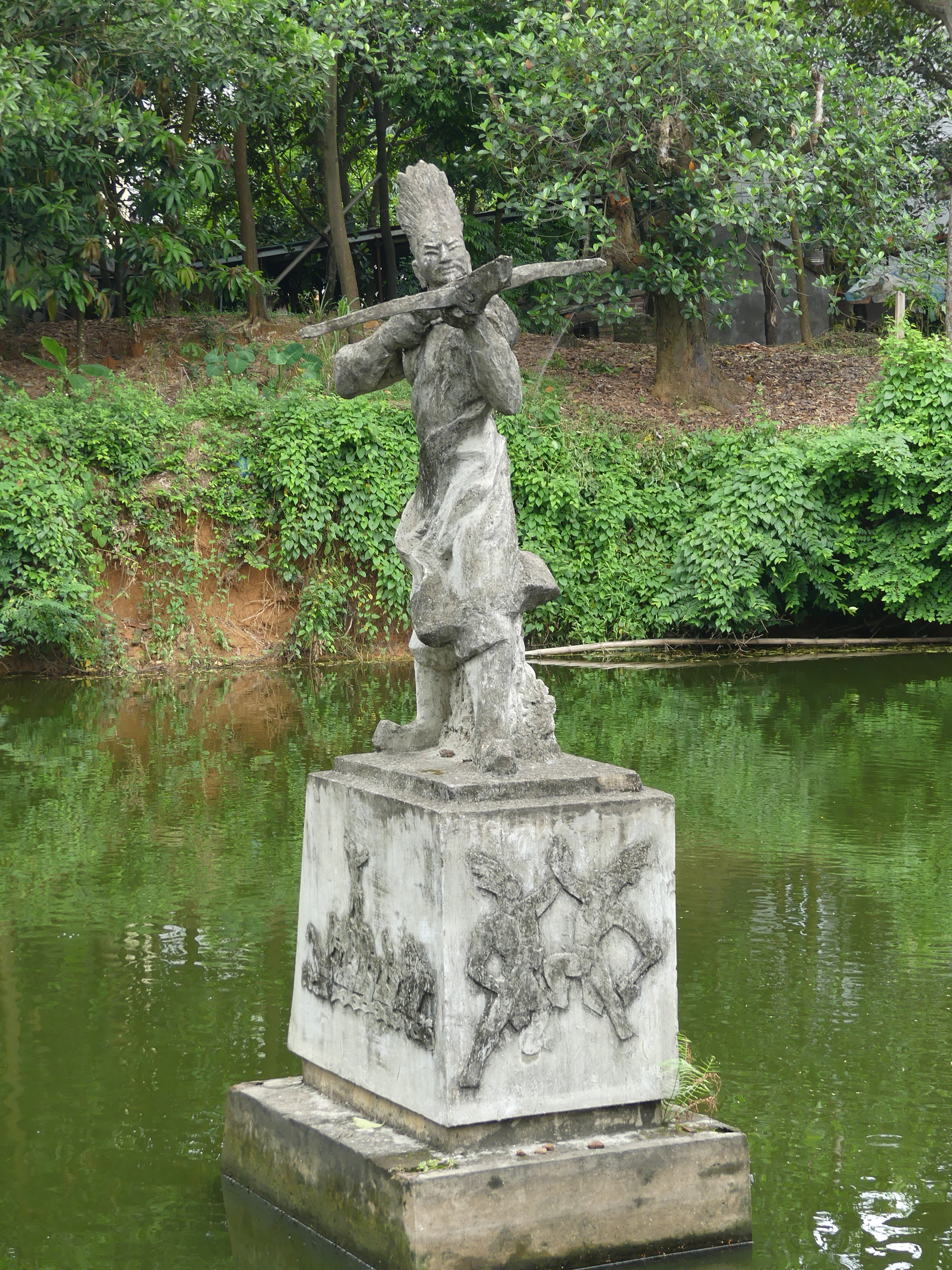
Statue of Cao Lỗ with the crossbow he built for An Dương Vương

=== Angkorian Period ===
The use of the crossbow by the Angkorian civilization can be traced back to the bas-relief on the walls of the Bayon temple which originated in the late 12th and early 13th centuries during the reign of Jayavarman VII, from 1181 to 1218 AD. These bas-relief show both hunters using crossbows for deer-hunting and soldiers mounted on elephants using crossbows in battle.

It is believed that the crossbow had been perfected by the Cham inflicted severe casualties on the Khmer who did not yet possess this technology. The Cham had probably received this technology from Chinese ambassadors. As seen on the bas-relief of the Bayon, the Khmer trained using targets on wheels to retaliate against these armed attacks and were finally victorious under Jayavarman VII.

The Khmer themselves designed a double-bow catapult mounted on elephants and worked by two men as well as enormous crossbows, were rolled on wheeled barrows and probably used in sieges or for the defence of fortified camps. The doubled crossbow mounted on elephant's back is presumed to have had enough force to be an effective anti-elephant weapon. According to Michel Jacq-Hergoual'ch, the double bow crossbows mounted on elephants were merely elements of Cham mercenaries in Jayavarman VII's army. Those were similar to the multiple-string arcuballistae used from the 11th century onwards by the Song dynasty.

The Angkorian crossbow was lost by the Khmer presumably after the fall of Angkor (1431 CE).

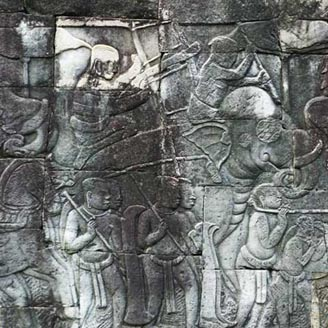
Khmer elephant mounted crossbow

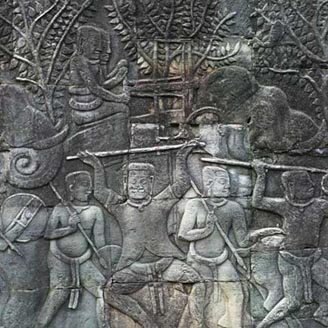
Khmer elephant mounted crossbow

=== Ethnological observations during French Indochina ===
In 1880, Louis Delaporte noticed the crossbows that were still being used in Cambodia were the same as the ones depicted on the bas-relief of Angkor Wat. Others noted that the crossbow was used by almost all the peoples in Indochine before firearms were introduced. However, according to Henri Mouhot, these crossbows were particularly associated to the Stieng people in both Annam and Cambodia, as they were feared because of their dexterity in their use of these weapons.

Jean Moura wrote that the Brau people were most famous in Cambodia for always carrying around the crossbow. Jean Moura also noted that the Brau people would add poison to the arrows to make them more deadly.

=== Use in Modern Warfare ===
Along with punji sticks, crossbows were the most powerful weapon as Indochina came under the influence of the French colonial empire. The span of the crossbow was a measuring distance. The throw of a crossbow of about 20–30 m (66–98 ft) was considered the safe distance around the village at the end of the 19th century, at a time at which the Brau from the North were fighting with the Tampuan from the East over the control of the Sesan and Srepok rivers in order to dominate the Red Hills plateaux of Ratanakiri.

In 1958, the crossbows of the Bajaraka resistance movement were confiscated. The movement, known as FULRO or United Front for the Liberation of Oppressed Races, united four main ethnic groups, including the Bahnar, Jarai, Ede and Koho people.

In fact, the native Montagnards of Vietnam's Central Highlands were known to have used crossbows, as both a tool for hunting, and later, an effective weapon against the Viet Cong during the Vietnam War. In 1968, Brou, Tampuan, and Jarai insurgents confronted Khmer troops and defeated with the crossbows, the international media helping to amplify their legend by romanticizing their poisonous darts. Montagnard fighters armed with crossbows therefore proved a highly valuable asset to the US Special Forces operating in Vietnam, and it was not uncommon for the Green Berets to integrate Montagnard crossbowmen into their strike teams.

=== Competitions ===
While the crossbow is used less for war and for hunting, it has remained a popular sport in Southeast Asia. Thus, as early as December 1938, crossbow competitions have been organized at Angkor Wat "with more than 500 warriors, most of them unsubdued".

Since the advent of mass tourism in Southeast Asia after the end of the Vietnam War, crossbows have become an "outrageous" souvenir for foreigners.

== Description ==
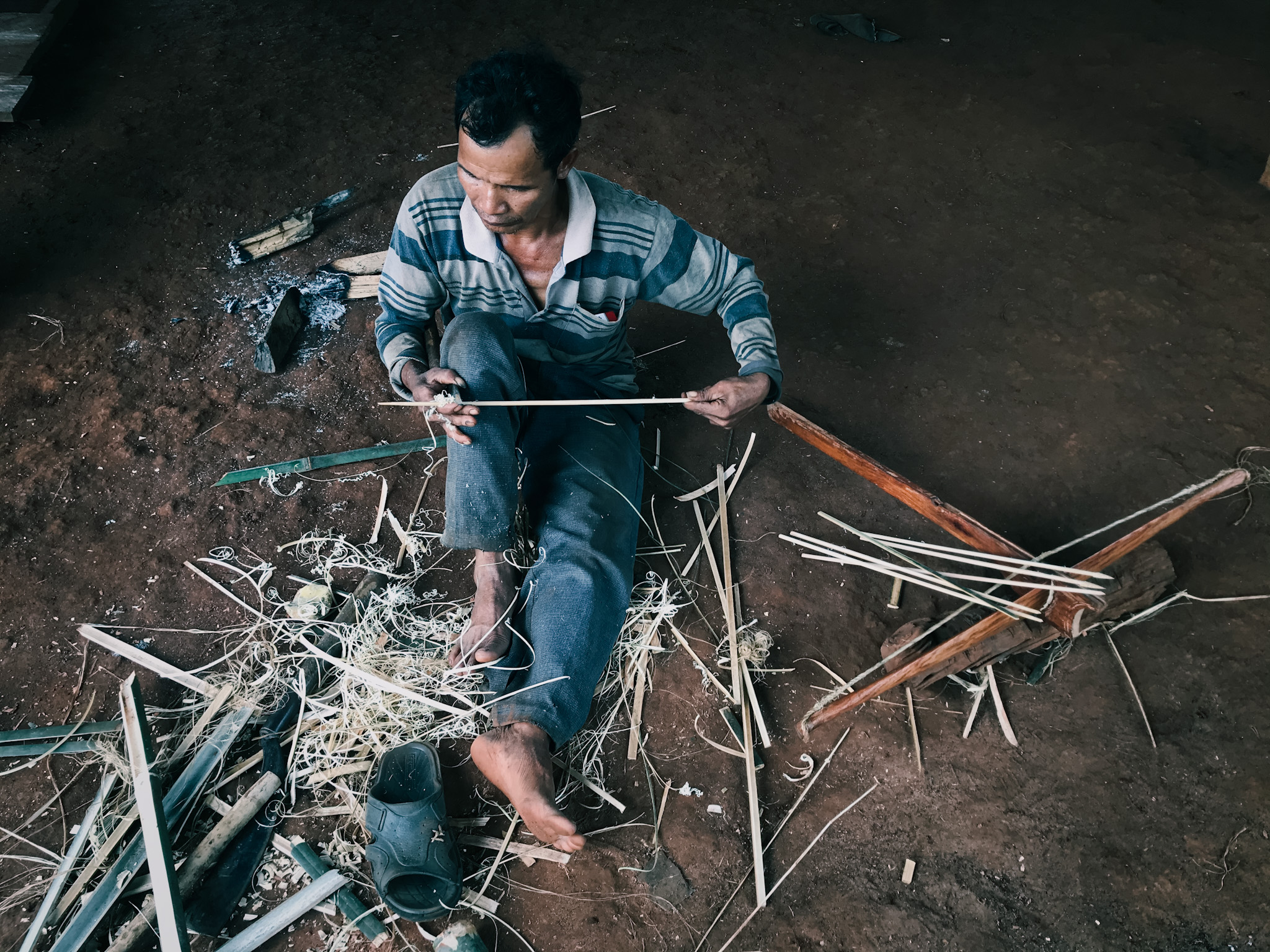
A fletcher making arrows for his crossbow in Ratanakiri in August 2022.

These crossbows have been observed among other ethnic groups in Southeast Asia such as the White Thai, the Muong of Hoa Bing, the Bunong of Mondulkiri and the Sach or the Lao, though the latter have a smaller version of it. Though the crossbow has different specificities in the various ethnic groups of Indochina where it is used, its functioning principle and its appearance are similar from one group to another.

The proportions of the Jarai crossbow are calculated in the following way: the length of the stock, between the place where the bow is embedded and the trigger, must be equal to half of an arm of the bow. The arrows (drang) are cut from a bamboo internode (boo) and have a fletching made of a piece of pandanus leaf (köbuut) folded into a diamond shape. The crossbow of the Mnong is slightly smaller.

The cord of the crossbows is usually made from natural fibers such as hemp, though it has often replaced by plastic bands nowadays.

The arrowheads are soaked in a kind of curare (kac): it is most often the sap of a large dense forest tree, quite rare in the region, the pöndrai which corresponds to Antiaris toxicaria. Another curare can be prepared from the sap of the Xylia (tröpeh) or the Sindora cochinchinensis Baill (kördaang) to which snake venom or pepper is added. Crossbow hunting (pany chrao) is often done on the lookout. Hunters use several types of shelters for this purpose. The Könöp is a mobile shelter of spherical shape about 1.2 m (3 ft 11 in) high or slightly more. A bamboo frame is covered with rice straw. Concealed inside, the hunter raises moves around with his shelter as he approaches his target. Könöp are made at the beginning of the dry season. They are used on clearings that have just been harvested. The Jarai also use a fixed foliage shelter called cöndraang. Hunter usually build these in a clearing or near a pond frequented by game.

Crossbows are usually kept hanging within the house of the Mon-Khmer ethnic groups along with other weapons and war trophies kept from bull sacrifices. It is one of the valuable assets of the Bahnar people and in the 1950s, one would inherit one or two crossbows as an inheritance and it is still used as a symbolic wedding gift.

== Bibliography ==
- Kelley, Liam C. (2014). "Constructing Local Narratives: Spirits, Dreams, and Prophecies in the Medieval Red River Delta". In Anderson, James A.; Whitmore, John K. (eds.). China's Encounters on the South and Southwest: Reforging the Fiery Frontier Over Two Millennia. United States: Brills. pp. 78–106.
- Liang, Jieming (2006), Chinese Siege Warfare: Mechanical Artillery & Siege Weapons of Antiquity, Singapore, Republic of Singapore: Leong Kit Meng, ISBN 981-05-5380-3
- Loades, Mike (2018), The Crossbow, Osprey
- Mus, Paul (1929). "Etudes indiennes et indochinoises, III. Les balistes du Bàyon". Bulletin de l'École française d'Extrême-Orient. 29 (1): 331–341. doi:10.3406/befeo.1929.3243.
- Needham, Joseph (1994), Science and Civilization in China 5-6
- Taylor, Keith Weller (1983). The Birth of Vietnam. University of California Press. ISBN 978-0-520-04428-9.
- Turnbull, Stephen (2002), Siege Weapons of the Far East (2) AD 960-1644, Osprey Publishing
