= Brau people =

Bahnaric people from Laos and Vietnam

Brau
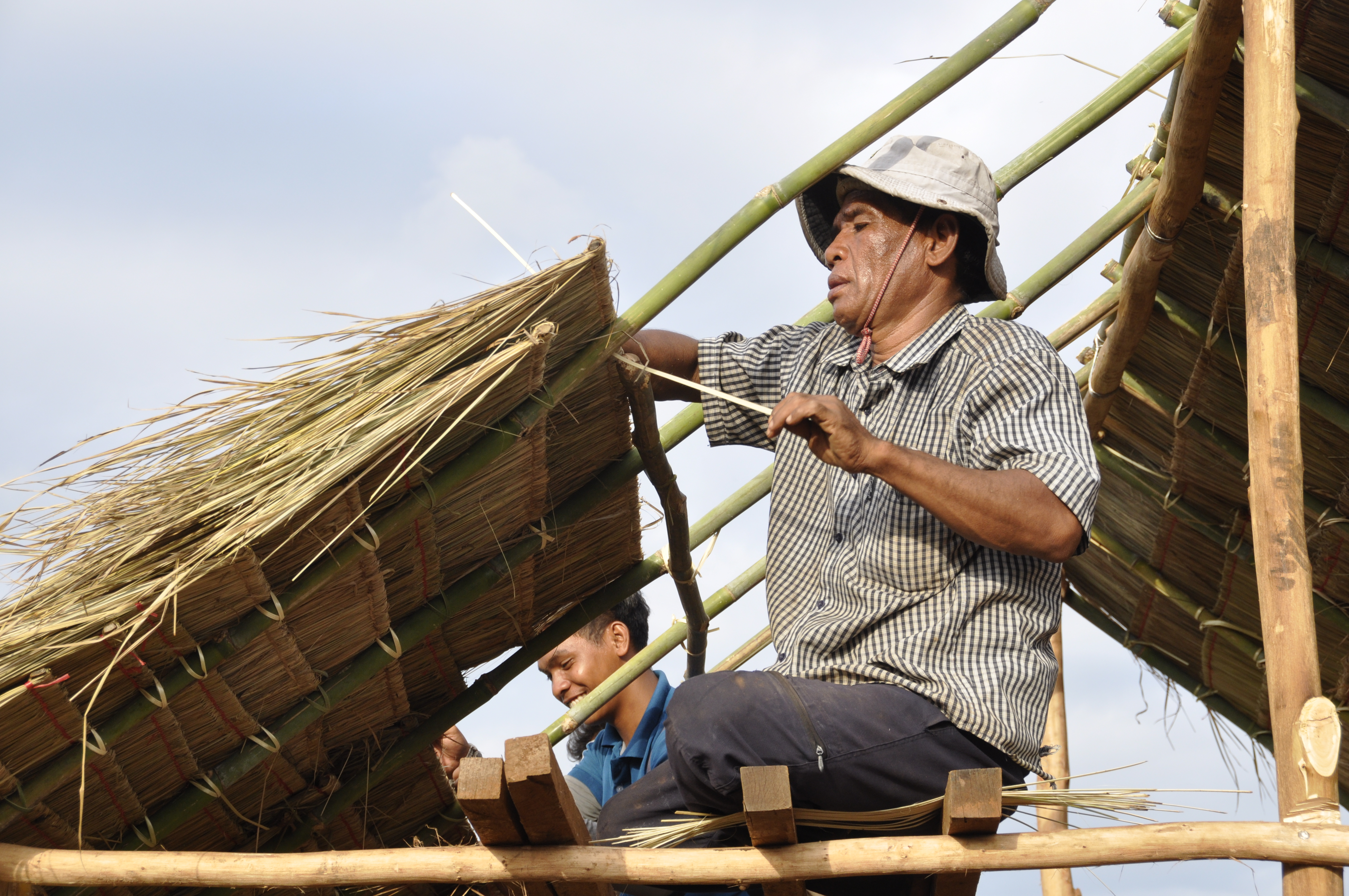
- Chief mahout at the Airavata Elephant Foundation, Mr. Bonruen of the Brau people, by constructing a roof for a ceremonial building

Total population
- 39,000 (2019)

Regions with significant populations
- Laos: 27,000; Cambodia: 11,000; Vietnam: 525 (2019)

Languages
- Brao • Vietnamese

Religion
- Animism

The Brau people (Vietnamese: Người Brâu) are an ethnic group living in Laos, Cambodia, and Vietnam. In Vietnam, most Brau live in Đắc Mế village, Bờ Y commune, Ngọc Hồi district, Kon Tum province (Đặng, et al. 2010:112), and the population was 525 in 2019. Their ancestors came from southern Laos and northeastern Cambodia, migrating to Vietnam around 150 years ago. They speak Brao, a Mon–Khmer language.

The Brau have only two surnames: Thao (for men) and Nang (for women). They talk about the Great Flood in their Un cha đắc lếp story, and about the Creator god named Pa Xây. They play Táp đinh bố - a kind of K'lông pút, and Tha - a special kind of gong.

The Brau have traditional customs such as uốt bưng (filing teeth), síp tiêu (strain ears), and chingkrackang (tattoo on forehead).

Their traditions are linked to nature and hunting, and they include practices such as the capture, taming, and training of elephants - referred to as Ruhe in the Brau Language. The last four elephants belonging to Airavata Elephant Foundation in Ratanakiri Province in Cambodia are cared for by mahouts of the Brau people. On the 26th of December, the first elephant baby born in 30 years was born here.
