= Alice Rasmussen =

Italian-Swedish art historian, and author

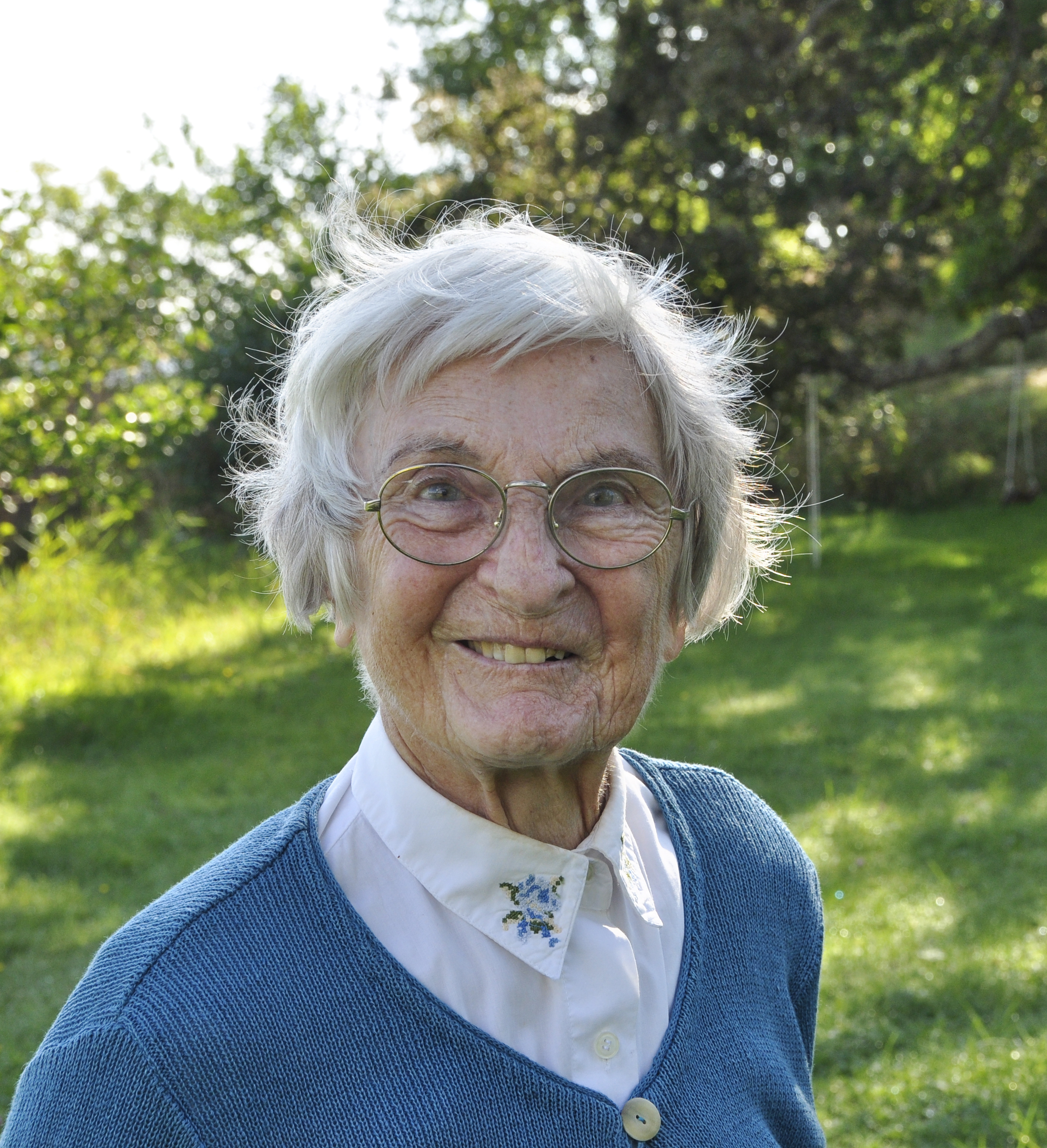
Alice Rasmussen (2014)

Alice Rasmussen (born Alice Fallai 3 November 1926) is an Italian-Swedish art historian, and author, specialised in art history, botany, and August Strindberg (1849–1912).

Alice Rasmussen was born 1926 to Luigi Fallai, and Alice Carlsson. She is great-granddaughter of Friedrichs Lachs, and grand-nephew to Charles Lachs, whose artistry she covered in Södermalm med omnejd i bilder av Charles Lachs (Stockholmia förlag, 2009). She grew up in Rome, Italy, and in Stockholm, Sweden, and studied the humanities, as well as history of religion at Stockholm University.

== Bibliography ==
- Några synpunkter på Kristusikonografins utveckling fram till och med den ottonska konsten (1975)
- Flora och fauna i Strindbergs skärgårdsskildring under 1870– och 1880-talen (1977)
- Några exempel på ikonografiska parallellföreteelser i samtida religioner vid tiden för kristendomens genombrott (1978)
- Stilar i konsten – Rokoko av Flavio Conti (translation by Alice Rasmussen, Wahlström & Widstrand, 1979)
- Strindbergsporträtt. Ett bidrag till Strindbergs ikonografi (Tryckgruppen AB, 1986, 145 p.)
- Strindbergs porträtt (Bokförlaget Fingraf, 1991, 478 p.)
- Vår skärgårds flora (1992)
- Det går en oro genom själen. Strindbergs hem och vistelseorter i Norden (1997)
- Södermalm med omnejd i bilder av Charles Lachs (Stockholmia förlag, 2009)
- Strindbergs flora (CKM Förlag, 2009, 563 p.)
- Strindbergs flora (CKM Förlag, 2012, 662 p.)
