= Hồ Nguyên Trừng =

Hồ Nguyên Trừng (chữ Hán: 胡元澄, pinyin: Hu Yuancheng; also known as Lê Trừng, Chinese: 黎澄; pinyin: Lí Chéng; courtesy name Mạnh Nguyên; 1374–1446) was a Vietnamese scholar, official, and engineer. He was the oldest son of Emperor Hồ Quý Ly (1336–1407) and older brother of Emperor Hồ Hán Thương. Under the pen-name Nam Ông (南翁, Old Man of the South), he wrote the Nam Ông mộng lục (chữ Hán: 南翁夢錄, literally Dream Memoir of Nam Ông).

== Biography ==
Hồ Nguyên Trừng played a role in the Ming-Hồ war where he led the army of Đại Ngu (Hồ dynasty) as well as invented various new types of weapons for the Đại Ngu military.

He is considered to be a prominent weapons engineer. One of his famous inventions was an early version of the "Eruptor" cannon, which was later adopted by the Ming dynasty to be used in many decked war vessels. After the fall of the Hồ dynasty, Hồ was captured by the Ming troops but was eventually exonerated and was to spend the rest of his life in exile in China.

For his contribution to the manufacturing of the cannons for the Ming dynasty's military, Hồ was appointed as a high-ranking official in the Ming dynasty's court. Nonetheless, his yearning for a return to his motherland never ceased to exist. He wrote the Nam Ông Mộng Lục, containing various stories about famous people of Giao Chỉ (the former name of Vietnam during Chinese occupation) that he either knew personally or through historical facts as a dedication to his motherland.

== See also ==
- Hồ dynasty
- Ming-Hồ war
- Hồ Quý Ly
- Hồ Hán Thương
- Cao Lỗ
- Trần Đại Nghĩa
