= Frederic Lillebridge =

- Born: December 14, 1857; Brooklyn, New York (state), United States
- Died: September 8, 1934 (aged 76); Dallas, United States
- Occupations: Pianist, composer, professor, Dean
- Spouse: Charlotte Lachs

Academic background
- Influences: Rafael Joseffy; Hans von Bülow; Carl Tausig

Academic work
- Discipline: Music
- Institutions: New York College of Music; Minnesota State University, Mankato; Texas Woman's College; University of Colorado; National University, St. Louis

Frederic May Lillebridge (December 14, 1857 – September 8, 1934) was a professional American pianist, composer and professor at New York College of Music, a music conservatory that merged with New York University in 1968. Among others, he was attached to the Chicago Symphony Orchestra.

== Biography ==
Fredric Lillebridge was born on December 14, 1857, in Brooklyn, New York, United States.

He studied music, specialising in piano, in America as well as in Europe, where he studied in England, France, Spain and (Germany). Among his teachers where Hans von Bülow and Carl Tausig in Berlin. He also attributed much of his success in piano work to Rafael Joseffy.

Lillebridge married the Bavarian-Swedish soprano singer Charlotte Lachs, a graduate from the Royal Conservatory of Music of Munich, Kingdom of Bavaria.

Frederic Lillebridge made multiple well-received concerts around Europe and America.

Where these measures in Guntram (Opera by Richard Strauss) they would be the most beautiful in the whole opera. They are in the highest degree interesting.

— German-American music theorist Bernhard Ziehn (1845–1912) on Frederic Lillebridge

Besides his appointment as professor in New York, he served as music director to several other academic institutions. Among them were the Department of Instrumental music of Minnesota State University, Mankato in Mankato, Minnesota, together with his wife, Charlotte Lachs, who was in charge of its Department of vocal music, the music faculty of the Texas Woman's College, future merger of Texas Wesleyan University, University of Colorado, and the Music Conservatory at Ripon, Wisconsin. Furthermore, he was the dean of the music department of the National University in St. Louis.

In addition, he was president of the Co-operative Teachers' Association.

Fredric Lillebridge died on September 8, 1934, in Dallas, Texas, and was buried in St. Louis, Missouri.

== Works ==
- Master Course of Piano Playing and Composition
- Studies in Musical Education History and Aesthetics (1916), Music Teachers National Association
- Progressive Exercises for Stretching and Making the Fingers Independent (1913), with Leopold Godowsky, St. Louis: Art Publication Society,
- Papers and proceedings at its thirty-seventh annual meeting, Buffalo, N. Y. (1916), Hartford, 320 p.
- Erb, J. Lawrence; Seashore, Carl E.; Wodell, F. W.; Dykema, P. W.; Pratt, Waldo S.; Whitmer, T. Carl; Earhart, Will; Lillebridge, Frederic (January 1, 1916). "Significant Papers from the M.T.N.A.". Music Supervisors' Journal. 2 (3): 12–28. JSTOR 3383175. S2CID 145001153.
- "Five Hundred Musicians Wanted". Music Supervisors' Journal. 2 (2): 18–20. January 1, 1915. doi:10.2307/3383124. JSTOR 3383124. S2CID 198731689.
- Instrumental Work with Juveniles: Its Value and Significance (1915)

== Bibliography ==
- Missouri Music (1924) by Ernst Christopher Krohn (Da Capo Press, Incorporated)
