= Charlotte Lachs =

American singer (1867–1920)

Charlotte Lachs (May 21, 1867 – January 13, 1920) was a Swedish-American soprano singer of Bavarian descent. With repertoire including composers such as Johannes Brahms, Hermann Berens, and Carl Czerny, she performed across Europe and America.

== Biography ==
Charlotte Lachs was born May 21, 1867, in Lindesberg, Sweden, to Friedrichs Lachs, a Bavarian brewmaster who had immigrated to Sweden in 1860, and Fredrika (née Lorentzon). Her siblings included Alice Brauner, and Charles Lachs, a visual artist. For her studies, Charlotte Lachs relocated to her family home region where she was admitted to the Royal Conservatory of Music of Munich, Kingdom of Bavaria. Among her teachers were Bernhard Fexer, Hugo Beyer, and Professor Hans Hasselbeck, the latter who considered her "an artist of great technical ability".

After a concert with the Swedish glee club in Tammany Hall, New York City, Swedish newspaper Aftonbladet reported that "still yet old Sweden is capable of sending out nightingales into the world, songbirds in whose soft and fresh tones equivalents are yet to be found".

Charlotte Lachs' multiple concerts across Europe and America made her a singer of "remarkble talent and diligence" with a voice "very fine sonorous and sympathetic" of "great sweetness, fullness, and carrying power", having the "richness of a contralto". Her "captivating", "dramatic fervor" of a "true artist" had her compared to Emma Albani, and Niels Gade spoke of her "in lavish terms of praise". Singing Giacomo Meyerbeer, one account noted that "she could sing so difficult an aria with such accuracy, such artless, bird-like freedom in trill and cadenza, shows a very high degree of careful and thorough training of the best sort".

Charlotte Lachs was also active as music pedagogue, instructing among others Fanny zu Reventlow. Eventually, she would permanently reside in the United States, where she married Frederic Lillebridge, professor at New York College of Music. Lachs was appointed directress of the departments of vocal music at the Conservatory of Music of Mount Allison University, of Belmont University, of Minnesota State University, as well as of Texas Woman's College, the future merger of Texas Wesleyan University.

She died January 13, 1920, in St. Louis, Missouri, United States.
