= Nam Ông mộng lục =

1442 memoir by Hồ Nguyên Trừng

Dream memoir of Southern Man 南翁夢錄
- Author: Lê Trừng
- Language: Hán văn
- Subject: Vietnamese anecdote
- Genre: Memoir
- Publication date: 1442
- Publication place: China

Dream memoir of Southern Man (chữ Hán: 南翁夢錄, Vietnamese: Nam Ông mộng lục) is a historical record written by Vietnamese official Hồ Nguyên Trừng during his exile in Ming dynasty in the early 15th century.

== History ==
Hồ Nguyên Trừng (or Lê Trừng) was the eldest son of Hồ Quý Ly who was the founder of the Hồ dynasty, and a renowned military inventor of Việt Nam for his innovation in making cannons and warships. After the defeat of the Hồ dynasty by the army of the Ming dynasty, Hồ Nguyên Trừng was captured in Hà Tĩnh in 1407 and transferred to China. He was pardoned and granted a position of supervisor in the military industry of the Ming. He was eventually promoted to Deputy Minister of Industry in the imperial court of the Ming dynasty.

At the end of his life, Hồ Nguyên Trừng decided to write his memoir to express his nostalgia about his homeland Đại Việt. The memoir was first published in China in 1442. Later Nam Ông mộng lục was brought back to Vietnam by the Vietnamese ambassador Lê Quý Đôn and had a considerable significance on the historiography and literature of Vietnam. In the foreword of the book, Hồ Nguyên Trừng wrote that he wanted to recite the stories that he had known in order to praise exemplary figures in history and provide those stories for readers. Nam Ông mộng lục is considered the first memoir and one of the earliest novels văn ngôn in the history of Vietnamese literature. However, Hồ Nguyên Trừng was not aware of the fact that his work belong to a new fictitious genre of literature instead of simply as an historical text.

== Contents ==
Nam Ông mộng lục is arranged in 31 chapters (thiên mục), each chapter is a story about a Vietnamese legend or a historical figure of the Lý or Trần dynasty that Hồ Nguyên Trừng considered typical of Vietnam. Today only 28 chapters remain while 3 chapters were lost. The subjects of the memoir come from relatives of the author, emperors and princes of the Trần dynasty, to famous scholars, priests and physicians. Following is the table of contents of Nam Ông mộng lục:

Chapter	Title	Content
01	"Nghệ vương thủy mạt" (藝王始末)	Story of Trần Nghệ Tông (Nghệ vương)
02	"Trúc Lâm kỳ tịch" (竹林示寂)	Story of Trần Nhân Tông (Master of Trúc Lâm)
03	"Tổ linh định mệnh" (祖靈定命)	Story of Trần Minh Tông
04	"Đức tất hữu vị" (德必有位)	Story of Trần Minh Tông's dignity
05	"Phụ đức trinh minh" (婦德貞明)	Story of Lady Lê, a concubine of Trần Duệ Tông
06	"Văn tang khí tuyệt" (聞喪氣絕)	Story of Trần Thái Tông
07	"Văn trinh ngạnh trực" (文貞鯁直)	Story of the royal teacher Chu Văn An
08	"Y thiện dụng tâm" (醫善用心)	Story of the physician Phạm Bân
09	"Dũng lực thần dị" (勇力神異)	Story of the general Lê Phụng Hiểu
10	"Phu thê tử tiết" (夫妻死節)	Story of the mandarin Ngô Miễn
11	"Tăng đạo thần thông" (僧道神通)	Story of the Buddhist masters Thông Huyền and Giác Hải
12	"Tấu chương minh nghiệm" (奏章明驗)	Story of Prince Chiêu Văn Trần Nhật Duật
13	"Áp Lãng chân nhân" (壓浪真人)	Story of the Taoist priest Áp Lãng
14	"Minh Không thần dị" (明空神異)	Story of the Buddhist master Nguyễn Minh Không
15	"Nhập mộng liệu bệnh" (入夢療病)	Story of the Buddhist master Quán Viên
16	"Ni sư đức hành" (尼師德行)	Story of the bhikkhuni Phạm thị
17	"Cảm kích đồ hành" (感激徒行)	Story of Trần Nhân Tông and Prince Văn Túc Trần Đạo Tái
18	"Điệp tự thi cách" (疊字詩格)	Story of Trần Thánh Tông's talent for poems
19	"Thi ý thanh tân" (詩意清新)	Story of Trần Nhân Tông's talent for poems
20	"Trung thực thiện chung" (忠直善終)	Story of the brothers Phạm Ngộ and Phạm Mại
21	"Thi phúng trung gián" (詩諷忠諫)	Story of Marquis Chương Túc Trần Nguyên Đán
22	"Thi dụng tiền nhân cảnh cú" (詩用前人警句)	Story of the scholar Nguyễn Trung Ngạn's talent for literature
23	"Thi ngôn tự phụ" (詩言自負)	Story of Nguyễn Trung Ngạn's character
24	"Mệnh thông thi triệu" (命通詩兆)	Story of the mandarin Lê Quát
25	"Thi chí công danh" (詩志功名)	Story of the general Phạm Ngũ Lão
26	"Tiểu thi lệ cú" (小詩麗句)	Story of the talent for poems of members of the Trần royal family
27	"Thi tửu kinh nhân" (詩酒驚人)	Story of Hồ Tông Trạc
28	"Thi triệu dư khánh" (詩兆餘慶)	Story of Lê Trừng
29	"Thi xưng tương chức" (詩稱相職)	Story of Trần Nghệ Tông's mandarins
30	"Thi thán trí quân" (詩歎致君)	Story of Trần Nguyên Đán's talent for poems
31	"Quý khách tương hoan" (貴客相歡)	

From its contents, Nam Ông mộng lục shows an important influence of Buddhism and Taoism during the reign of the Lý and Trần dynasties.
