= Lach (disambiguation) =

Lach is an American musician.

Lach may also refer to:

- Lach (name), a surname
- Lach dialects or Lachian dialects, a group of Silesian dialects

== See also ==
- Lache
- Lachs
- Lachy Sądeckie
- Lakh, a unit in the Indian numbering system
- Lech (disambiguation)
- Loch (disambiguation)
