= Charles Lachs =

German painter

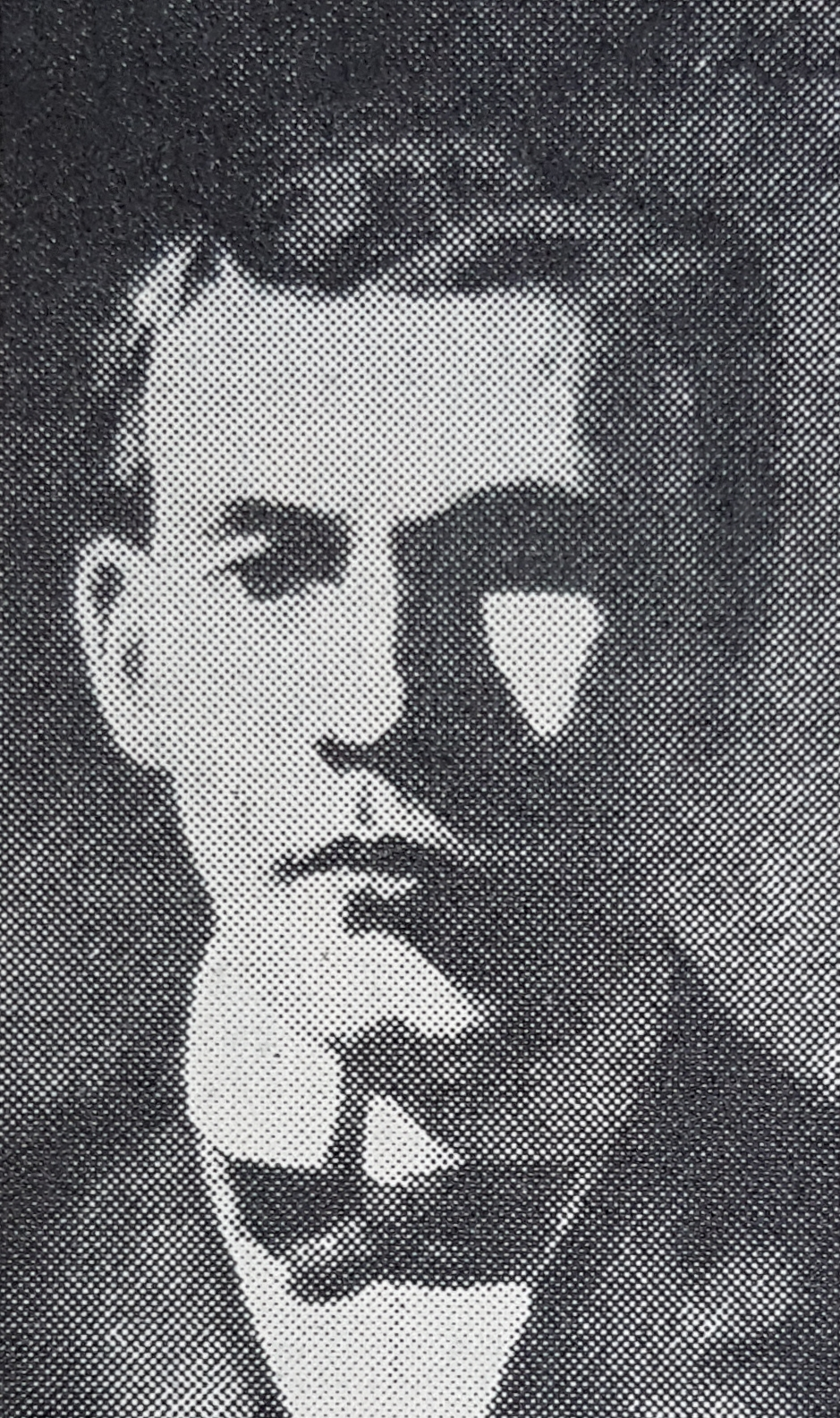
- Charles Georg Lach's section of a drawing by an unknown artist at the Royal Library Stockholm, photographed portrait from Allhem's Swedish Artists' Lexicon.
- Born: Charles Georg Lachs; 1879; Örebro, Sweden
- Died: 1972 (aged 92–93); Stockholm, Sweden
- Education: Tekniska skolan, Konstnärsförbundets målarskola
- Style: Oil painting, etching

Charles Georg Lachs (1879-1972) was a Bavarian-Swedish visual artist. Specialising in oil and etching, his motifs ranged from landscapes and portraits to humble working class areas around fin de siècle Stockholm.

== Biography ==
Charles Lachs was born in 1879 in Örebro to Friedrichs Lachs, and Fredrika (née Lorentzon). He was the brother of Charlotte Lachs, singer, and Alice Brauner. He married Ellen Lindelöw from Ångermanland.

Lachs studied at Tekniska skolan (future Konstfack) 1894-1897, and at Konstnärsförbundets målarskola 1900. In addition, he was tutored at the etching school of Axel Tallberg, and made study travels around the United States, and the German Empire. He shared atelier with artists such as Ivar Arosenius, and John Bauer.

Lachs is represented inter alia at the National Library of Sweden, and Stockholm City Museum.
