= Elephant Managers Association =

International learned society for computing

- Formation: 1988; 38 years ago
- Type: 501(c)(3) not-for-profit membership corporation
- Headquarters: 1513 Cambridge Street, Houston Texas 77030
- President: Daryl Hoffman
- Website: elephantmanagers.com

The Elephant Managers Association (EMA) is an international non-profit organization, for elephant professionals and interested people. EMA, having the largest collection of elephant experts and enthusiasts in the world, promotes welfare, husbandry, and scientific research of captive elephants, through its publication "grey matters", communication and relations among elephant managers through an annual conference and publications, and is also engaged in public education, as well as Conservation biology of the worlds wild populations of elephants.

== History ==
Elephant professionals in North America began, during the early eighties, to gather for informal meetings, and while enjoying the sharing of information, it was realized that there was a need for a formal platform, why EMA was founded in 1988 in Jacksonville Zoo and Gardens, by elephant keepers in USA and Canada. EMA initially focused on husbandry issues and training of elephants, in North America, and has since then become the largest international organization of elephant professionals and enthusiasts, also as an international platform for people outside the USA.

== Members ==
EMAs present members are Animal care administrators, veterinarians, researchers, educators, zoo volunteers, and wildlife enthusiasts, from all over the world. Anyone interested in elephants, who share the objectives and goals of EMA, can become a member. The present professional members are representing over 80% of all Association of Zoos and Aquariums (AZA) elephant-holding facilities and the majority of private owners and circuses.

== Board ==
The present board as of 2020, consists of executive Director of EMA, Daryl Hoffman, Curator of Large Mammals at Houston Zoo. President of EMAs board is Vernon Presley who is Curator of Elephants and Ungulates at Fresno Chaffee Zoo. Vice President is Shawn Finnell who is currently involved in the Conservation, Training, & Membership Committees.

Other board members include Secretary Tripp Gorman who is elephant keeper at Fort Worth Zoo, Rob Conachie, elephant keeper at Pairi Daiza in Belgium, Adam Felts, Curator of Heart of Africa and Asia Quest at Columbus Zoo and Aquarium, Cecil Jackson Jr., elephant manager at Cincinnati Zoo and Botanical Gardens, and Mike McClure, General Curator and elephant Manager at The Maryland Zoo.

== Activities ==
EMA today promote high standards of safety and humane treatment in elephants but is also linked as an independent partner to International Elephant Foundation (IEF), and is serving as an advisory capacity to many regulatory agencies, including United States Department of Agriculture (USDA) and Animal and Plant Health Inspection Service (APHIS).

EMA has an executive committee to assist in mission-focused actions of the organization, as well as a number of Committees to achieve EMA's mission, including Husbandry, training, Behavioral Enrichment, Conservation, Education, Publications, Research, Ethics & Legislation, Membership, Conference, organization, Nominations, Merchandise, Grants, Scholarships, Honors and Awards, and Social Media.
