= Zoolandia =

Zoo/theme park in Lieto, Finland

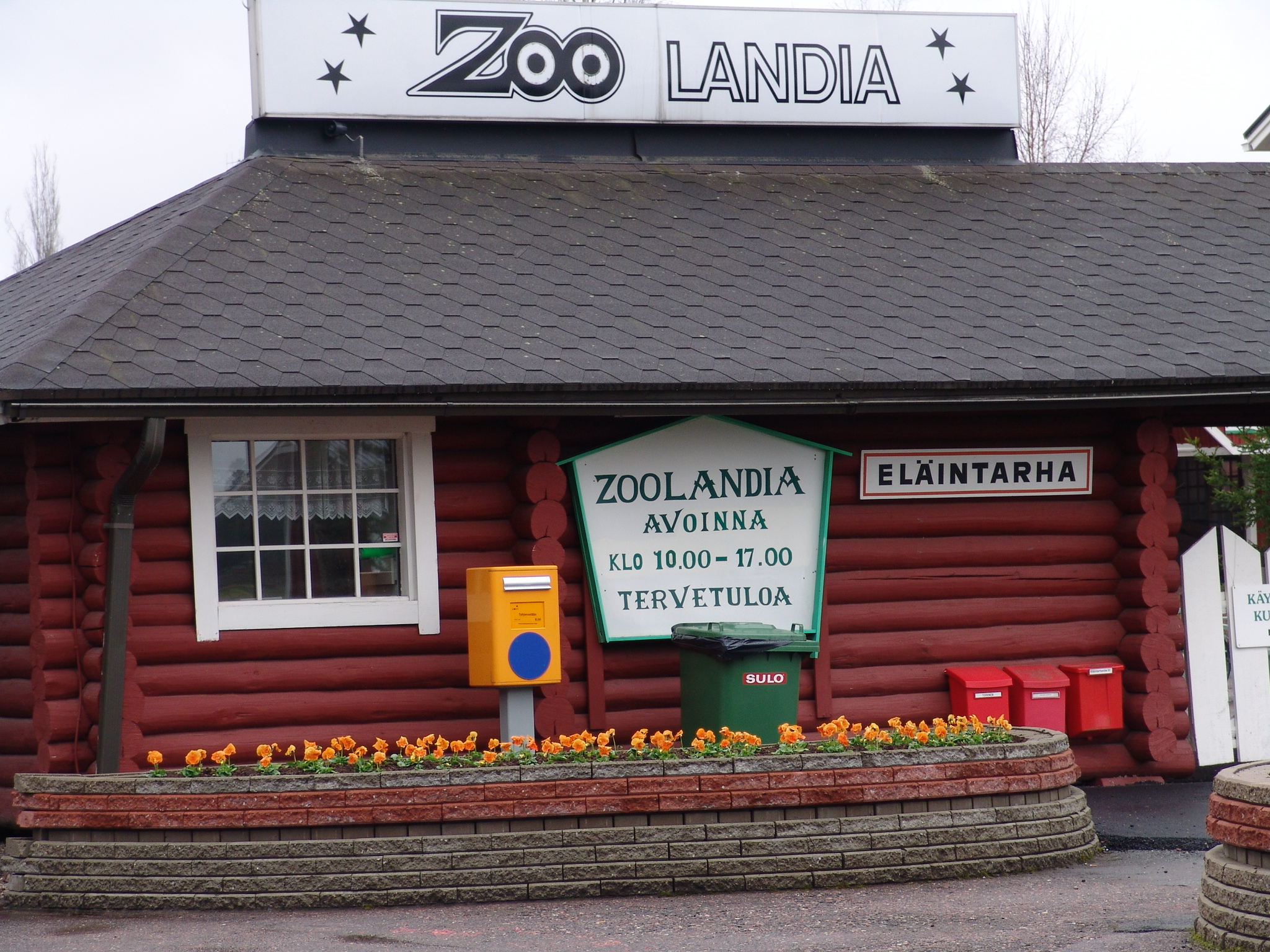
- Interactive map of Zoolandia
- 60.5671078°N 22.4343395°E
- Location: Lieto, Finland
- No. of animals: 160
- Volume of largest tank: 50
- Website: web.archive.org/web/20120703051949/http://www.zoolandia.fi:80/www/english

Zoolandia is a zoo located Lieto, Finland, about a 20-minute drive north of Turku. The zoo is home to about 160 animals representing 50 species.
