= Cao Lỗ =

Vietnamese weaponry engineer and minister

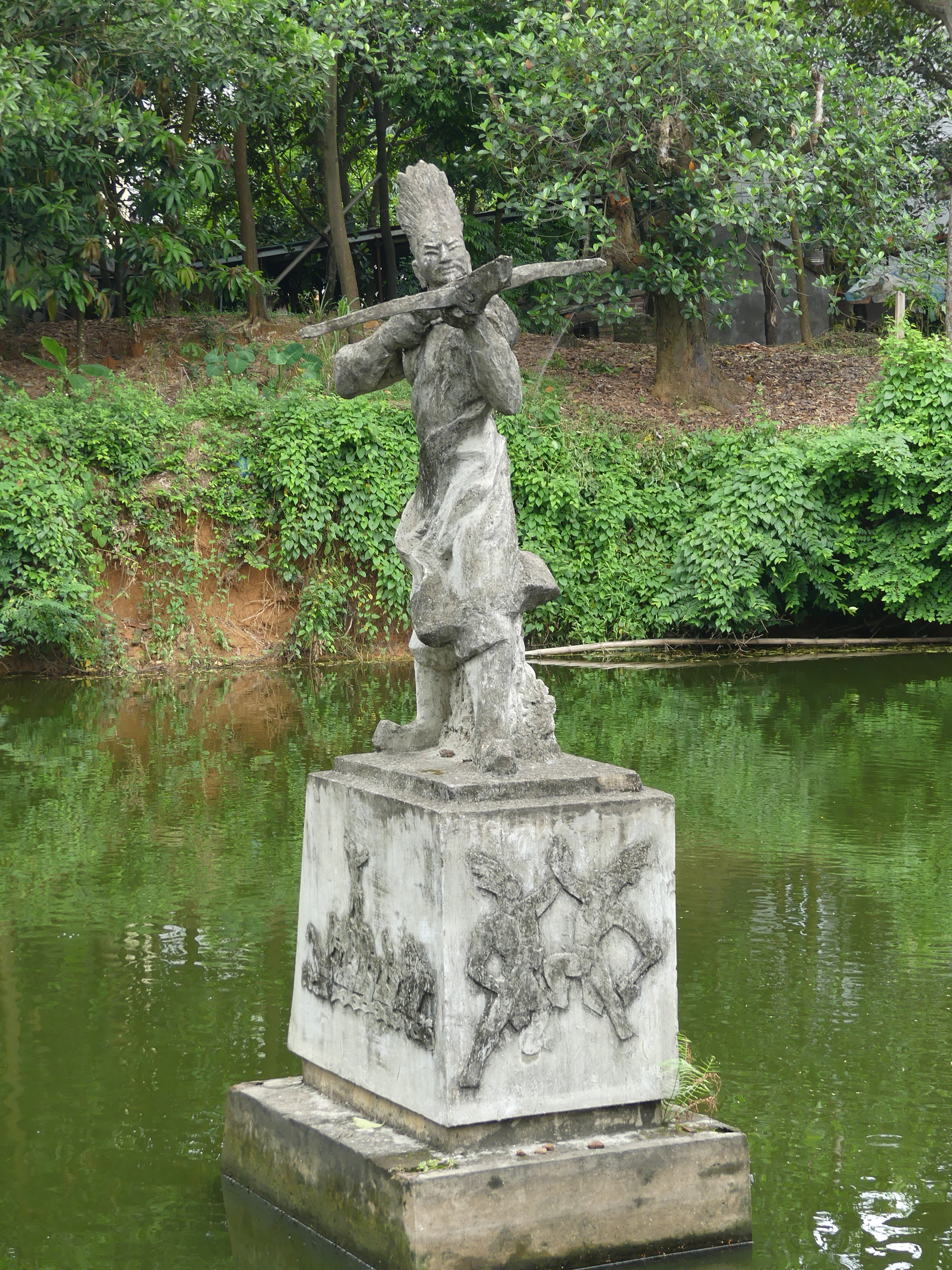
Statue of Cao Lỗ in Cổ Loa, Hanoi

Cao Lỗ (皐魯, also known as Cao Thông, Đô Lỗ, Thạch Thần, or Đại Than Đô Lỗ Thạch Thần) was a Vietnamese weaponry engineer and minister who lived during the reign of King An Dương Vương. According to mythology, he built a crossbow from the claw of a turtle god that can fire 300 arrows in a single shot.

== See also ==
- Âu Lạc
- An Dương Vương
- Hồ Nguyên Trừng
- Trần Đại Nghĩa

== Bibliography ==
- Kelley, Liam C. (2014). "Constructing Local Narratives: Spirits, Dreams, and Prophecies in the Medieval Red River Delta". In Anderson, James A.; Whitmore, John K. (eds.). China's Encounters on the South and Southwest: Reforging the Fiery Frontier Over Two Millennia. United States: Brills. pp. 78–106.
- Taylor, Keith Weller (1983). The Birth of Vietnam. University of California Press. ISBN 978-0-520-04428-9.
