= K'lông pút =

Type of xylophone

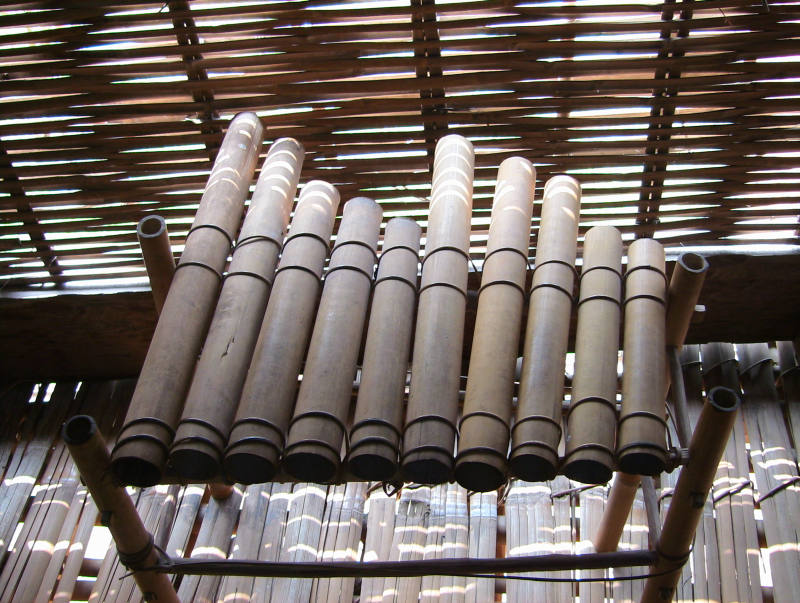
A klong put

The k'lông pút is a traditional bamboo xylophone of the Bahnar people in Vietnam. However, sound is produced through resonance by clapping at the end of the tubes, and not struck like many bar percussion instruments.
