= Airavata Elephant Foundation =

Nonprofit Cambodian Organisation on conserving and protecting Elephants

Airavata
- Founded: August 2016; Phnom Penh, Cambodia
- Founder: Pierre-Yves Clais; Professor François-Xavier Roux; Chenda Clais
- Type: Non-profit Organisation
- Purpose: Asian elephant conservation
- Location: Banlung, Ratanakiri Province, Cambodia
- Method: Protection of forest, Environmental Education, Ecotourism
- Key people: Dan Koehl, elephant trainer and advisory expert consultant
- Website: www.airavata-cambodia.com

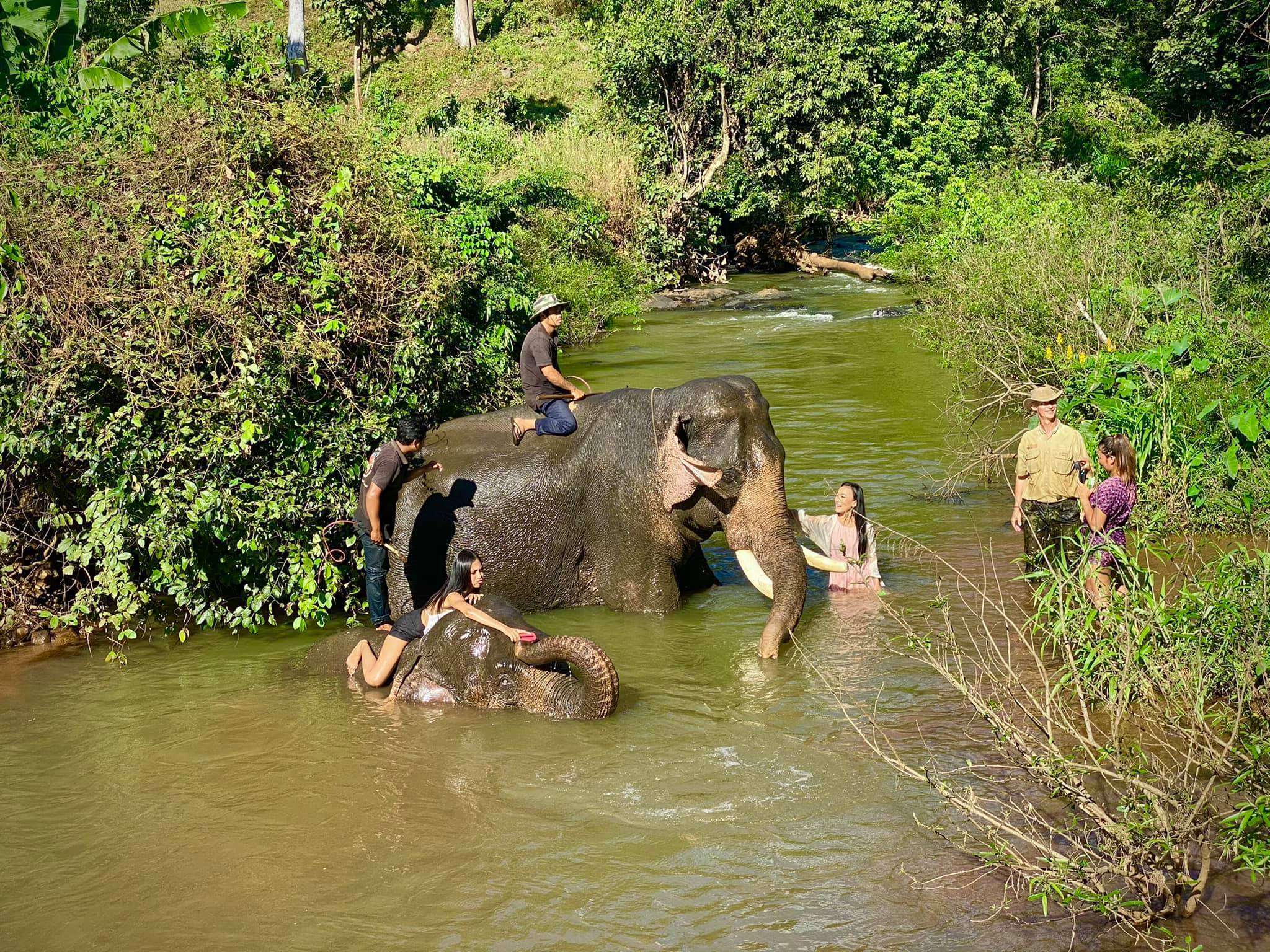
The founder of Airavata elephant Foundation Pierre-Yves Clais, with Miss Cambodia 2020 Sarita Reth and Somanika Suon, and elephants Bokva and Ikeo, at Katieng, Banlung

Airavata is a nonprofit organisation founded by Chenda Clais, Professor François-Xavier Roux and Pierre-Yves Clais, protecting the last captive Asian elephants in Ratanakiri Province in Cambodia, as well as protecting up to 100 hectares of the Katieng forest along the river close to the Katieng Waterfalls 10 Kilometer west from the Ratanakiri capitol, Banlung.

== Captive elephants in Cambodia ==
Wars, and the time during which Cambodia was ruled by the Khmer Rouge reduced the population of Cambodias elephants, both in the wild as well as in captivity. Cambodia is presently home to less than 100 captive Asian elephants, most of them being cared for by private owners in Mondulkiri Province.

== Airavata elephants ==
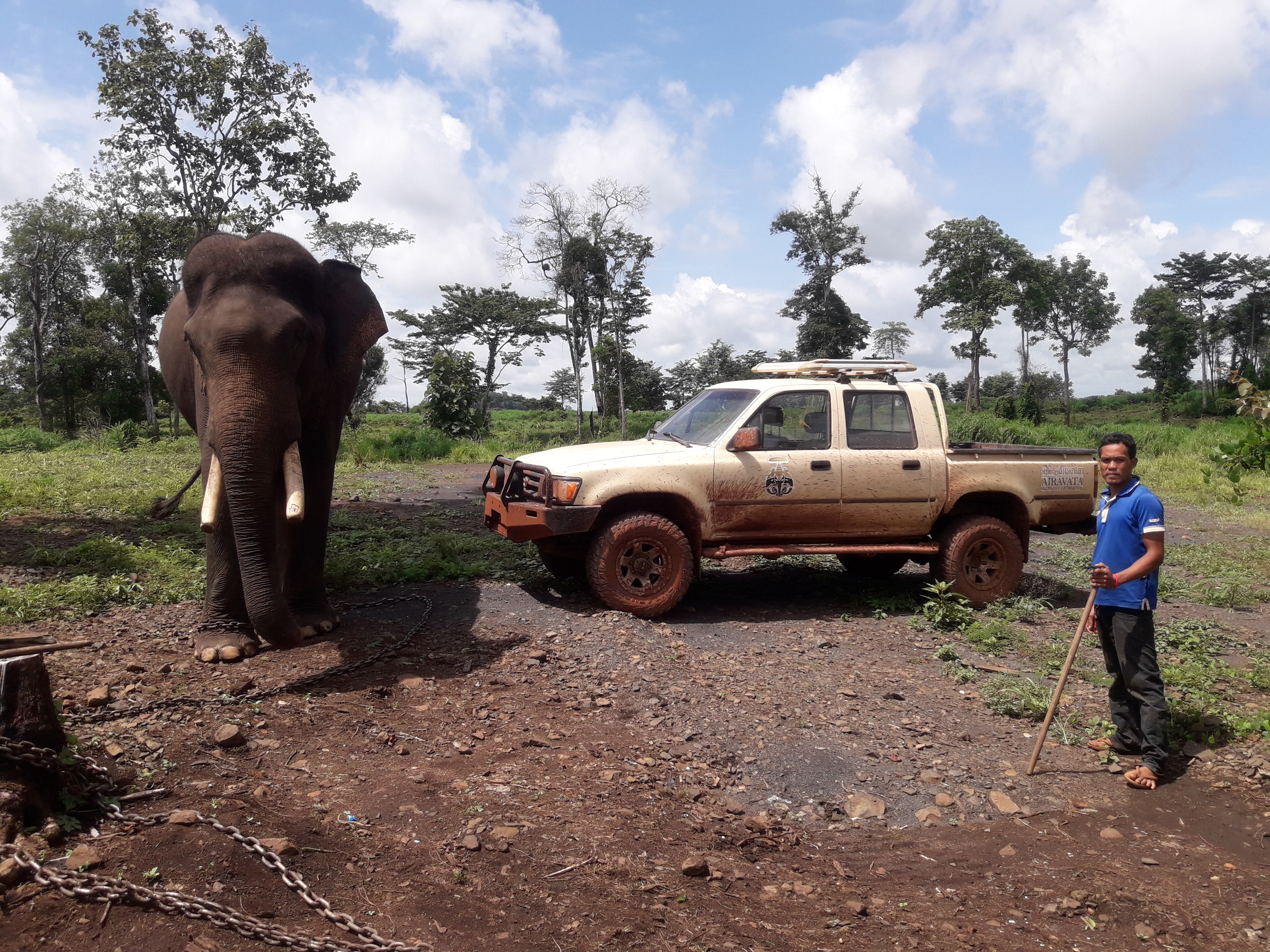
The Elephant Bak Mai at Airavata

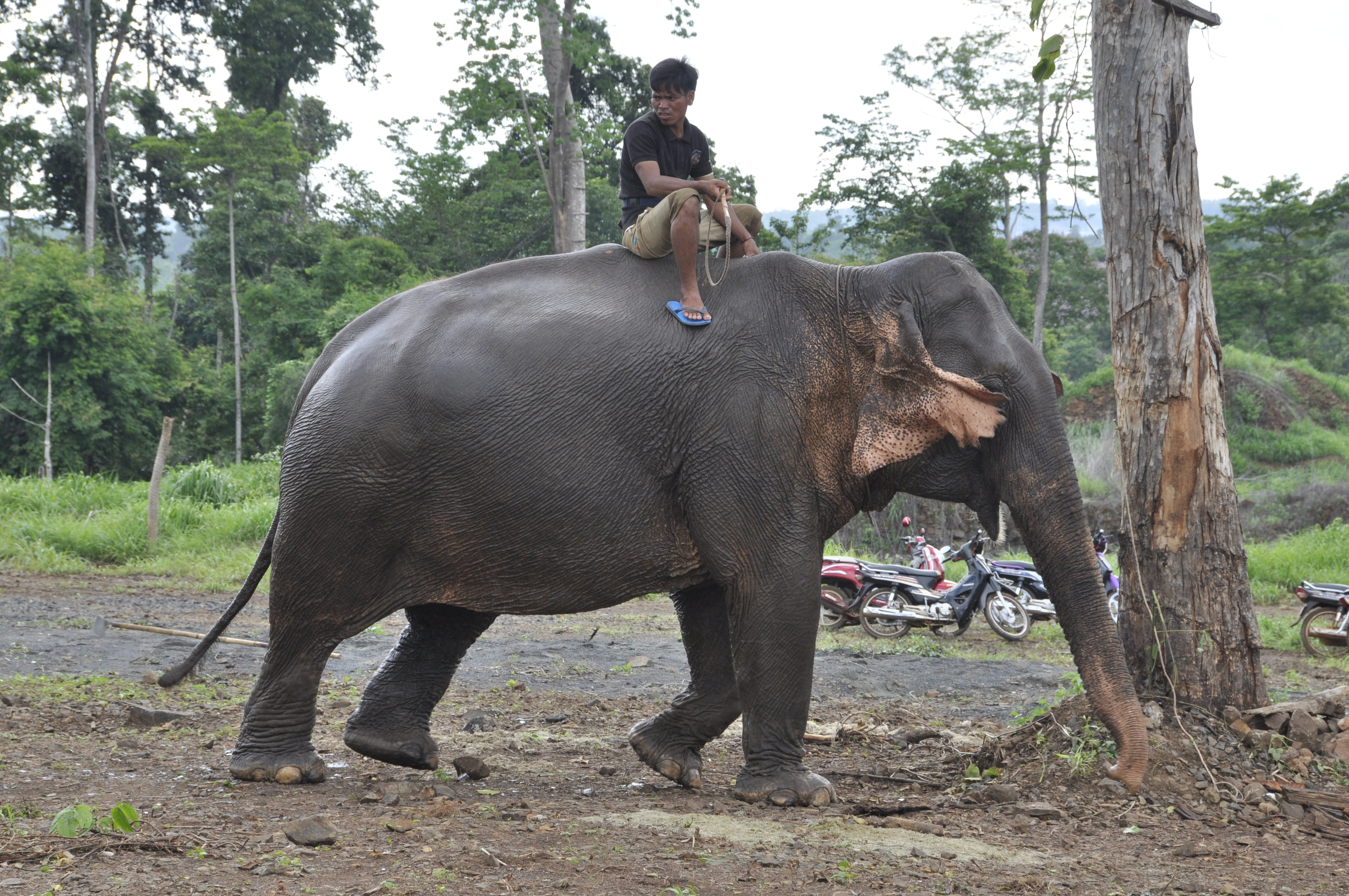
The Elephant Ikea at Airavata

Presently, Airavata Foundation owns four elephants, two bulls; Bokva, Kamsen, the female Ikeo and her female baby Noelle, which are the last four captive elephants in the Ratanakiri Province. All three of the elephants are from the community forest in Ratanakiri. Airavatas elephants have since April 2019 been trained and the mahout staff coached, by the Swede Dan Koehl .

== Bakmai's second chance ==
The elephant bull Bak Mai killed its previous mahout and owner in Mondulkiri in September 2016, after which Airavata bought the then-32-year-old bull to rehabilitate it and integrate it with their other elephants, but unfortunately died in May 2020, under mysterious circumstances, including unusual diarrhoea when he was taken in the morning to the nearby river for drinking. He collapsed and could not get up, and died, still lying on the side, approximately 16 hours later.

== Breeding ==
Cambodia had not experienced any captive born elephant in over 30 years, when the 38 year old Ikeo gave birth to a female elephant calf on 26 December 2021. The elephant baby was named Noelle.

== Activities ==
Concentrating on the surviving captive population of Asian elephants in Cambodia, the foundation, recently set under the high patronage of King Norodom Sihamoni of Cambodia, offer guests a number of activities in Katieng forest, including trekking, elephant riding and an educational program.
