= Friedrich Lachs =

Bavarian-Swedish brewmaster (1832-1910)

Friedrichs Lachs
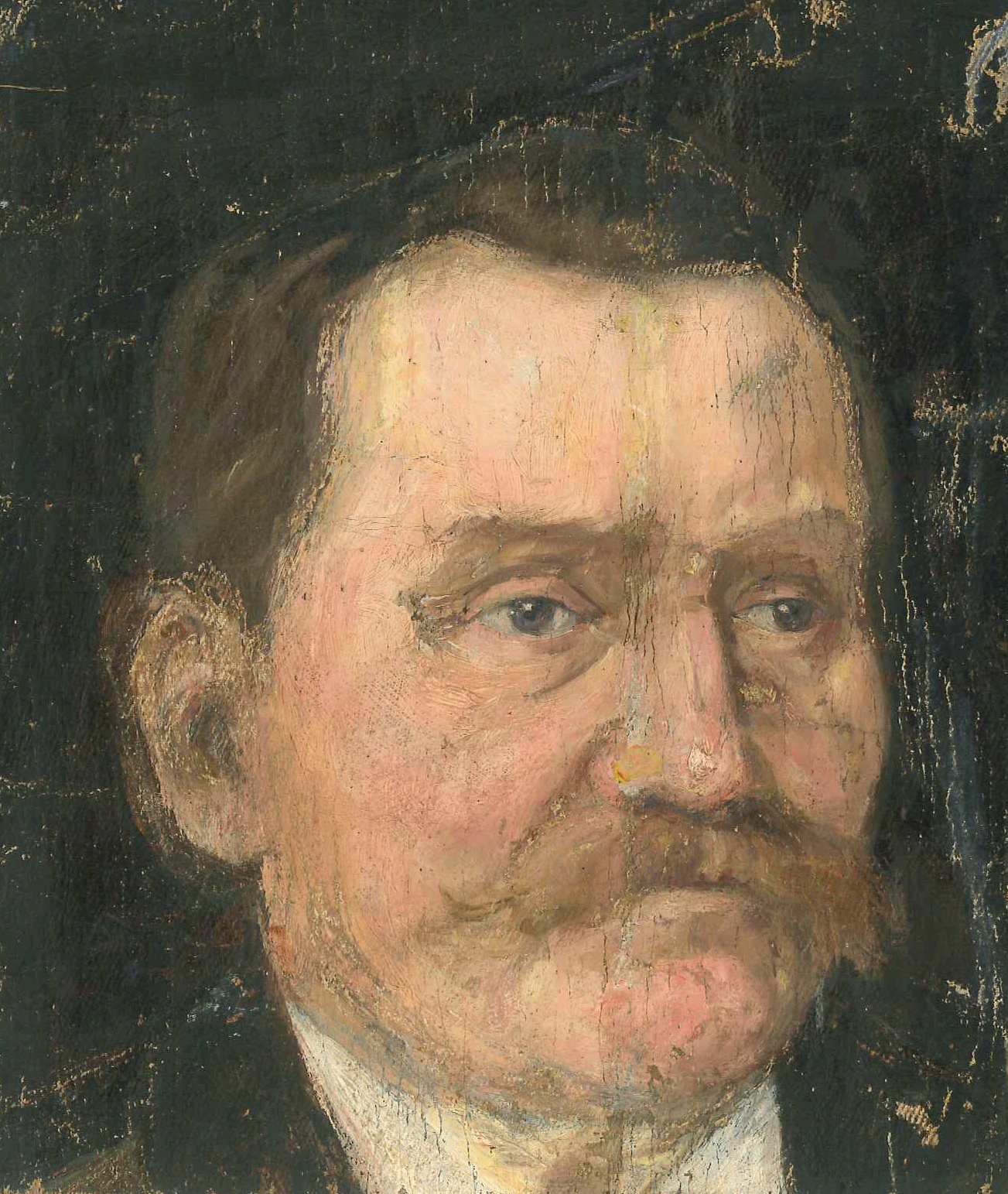
- Portrait by the son Charles Lachs (1879-1979).
- Born: 9 January 1832; Altdorf bei Nürnberg, Kingdom of Bavaria
- Died: 17 June 1910 (aged 78); Stockholm, Sweden
- Occupation: Brewmaster

Carl Siegmund Friedrichs Lachs (1832-1910) was a Bavarian-Swedish brewmaster active in Sweden and the United States.

Friedrichs Lax was born on 9 January 1832 in Altdorf bei Nürnberg, Kingdom of Bavaria. He immigrated to Halmstad, Sweden, in 1860; naturalised as Swedish citizen in 1878. He married Fredrika (née Lorentzon) (1845-1941) in Gothenburg in 1866. Their issue included Charlotte Lachs (1867-1920), singer, Alice Brauner (1877-1944), and Charles Lachs (1879-1979), visual artist.

Friedrichs Lachs was active, including as business partner, initially as brewmaster among others at sv:Österman & Co, sv:S:t Eriks Bryggeri, and sv:Nürnbergs Bryggeri. Subsequently he ventured into sv:O. Vallmo & Co, sv:Örebro Bryggeribolag, and sv:Klosterbryggeriet Ystad; the latter accordingly brewing the first Bavarian beer in Sweden, including to the royal court. Furthermore, he brewed Fred Lax's Columbus Ale in New York City, United States. After relocating to Sweden he founded a yeast factory on Södermalm in Stockholm in 1894.

He died on 17 June 1910 and is buried in Sandsborgskyrkogården.
