= Brauner family =

Brauner Bruun, Braun
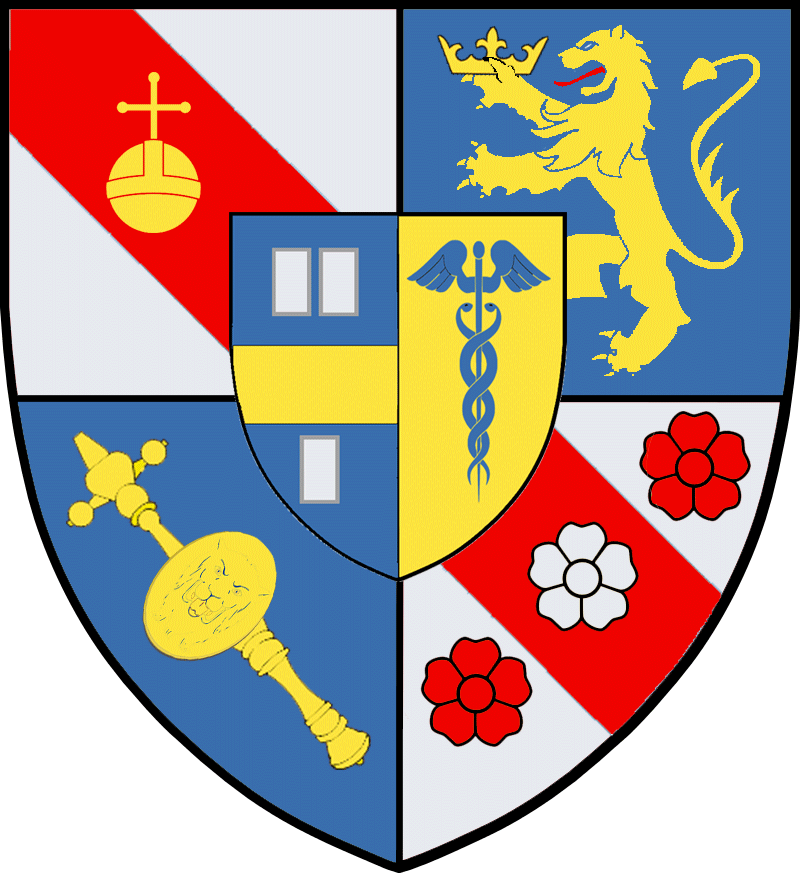
- Baronial coat of arms
- Country: Sweden
- Place of origin: Fagerhult, Högsby Municipality, Småland
- Founder: Johan Brauner
- Titles: Knight (1715); Freiherr (1731)

Brauner is a Swedish noble family, with eldest primogenitor the vicar Nicolaus Brodderi Braun (1617-1692) in Madesjö, Nybro, Diocese of Växjö.

The County Governor sv:Johan Brauner (1668-1743) was ennobled (n:o 1490) in 1715 by King Charles XII of Sweden; elevated to Freiherr in 1731 by King Frederick I of Sweden.
