= Diệu Nhân =

Princess in Vietnamese history (1041–1113)

- Born: 1041; Thăng Long, Đại Việt
- Died: 1113 (aged 71–72); Thăng Long, Đại Việt

Lý Thị Ngọc Kiều (chữ Hán: 李氏玉嬌; 1041–1113), dharma name Diệu Nhân (妙因), was a princess during the Lý dynasty in Vietnamese history. She was the 17th leader of the Vietnamese Vinītaruci school of Buddhism.

== Biography ==
Diệu Nhân was born the eldest daughter of Lý Nhật Trung, a son of Emperor Lý Thái Tông, in 1041. She was raised in the royal court of Emperor Lý Thánh Tông, then married to a highland chief in Chau Dang (modern Hưng Hóa region). She became a Buddhist nun after the death of her husband.

== Books ==
- Đại Việt sử ký toàn thư (Tập I, bản dịch). Nhà xuất bản Khoa học Xã hội, Hà Nội, 1983.
- Noname, Thiền uyển tập anh ngữ lục (bản dịch của Ngô Đức Thọ và Nguyễn Thúy Nga). Nhà xuất bản Văn học, Hà Nội, 1990.
- Monk Thích Thanh Từ, Thiền sư Việt Nam. Thành hội Phật giáo Thành phố Hồ Chí Minh, 1992.
- Scholar Nguyễn Đăng Na, Văn học thế kỷ X-XIV. Nhà xuất bản Khoa học Xã hội, Hà Nội, 2004.
- Scholar Trần Thị Băng Thanh, Lý Ngọc Kiều - From a princess to monk Diệu Nhân, Faces in Thăng Long. Nhà xuất bản Hà Nội, 2010.
- Scholar Đoàn Thị Thu Vân, Poems of Lý Trần Period. Hội nghiên cứu giảng dạy văn học Thành phố Hồ Chí Minh cùng nhà xuất bản Văn Nghệ Thành phố Hồ Chí Minh hợp tác ấn hành năm 1998.

== Sources ==
- About monk Lý Thị Diễm
- Ni sư Diệu Nhân trong sách Thiền sư Việt Nam
- Ni sư Diệu Nhân
- Phan Hữu Nghệ, "Một cách hiểu bài thơ Sinh Lão Bệnh Tử của Ni sư Diệu Nhân" đăng trong Tạp chí Hán Nôm, số 1 (10), 1991
