= Jiude =

Jiude may refer to:

- Jiude Commandery (九德郡), around present-day North Central Coast, Vietnam
- Jiude/Cửu Đức Province (九德縣; today Hà Tĩnh), a province Rudravarman I invaded
- Lu Jiude (盧九德), an eunuch in China
- Jiude Village (九德里), Wuri District, Taichung, Taiwan
- Jiude metro station, Taiwan

== See also ==
- Regnal name of Emperor Huizong of Western Xia is Emperor Jiude Zhuguo Zengfu Zhengmin Daming (就德主國增福正民大明皇帝)
