= Chengzhui line =

Taiwan rail line

Chengzhui Line
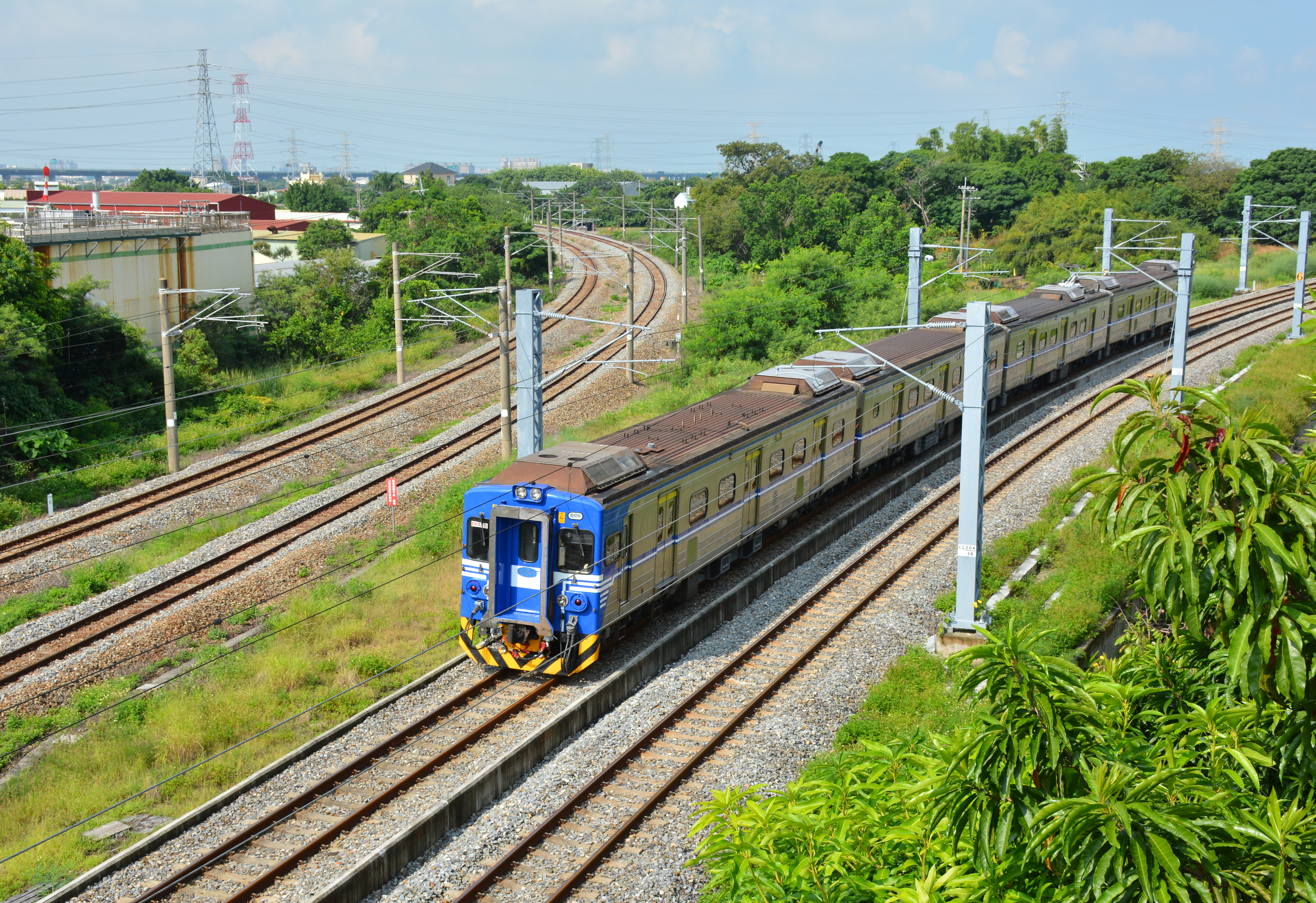
- An EMU500 series train running on the Chengzhui Line (right). The tracks on the left are of the Taichung Line.

Overview
- Native name: 成追線
- Owner: Taiwan Railway
- Termini: Chenggong; Zhuifen
- Stations: 2

History
- Opened: 11 October 1922

Technical
- Line length: 2.2 km (1.4 mi)
- Track gauge: 1,067 mm (3 ft 6 in)
- Electrification: Entire line, 25 kV

The Chengzhui line (Chinese: 成追線; pinyin: Chéngzhuī Xiàn) is a line of the Taiwan Railway connecting the Taichung line at Chenggong station to the West Coast line at Zhuifen station, forming a wye. Currently, only local services run through the Chengzhui Line, make a direct connect between stations on Mountain line and stations on Coastal line and 11.8 km shorter of travel route and without needed to transfer at Changhua station, saving about 10 minutes travel time and waiting time while transfer at Changhua station.

As part of the "Greater Taichung Yamanote Line" plan by the Ministry of Transportation and Communications, the line was upgraded to double-track to allow for increased traffic between downtown Taichung and its coastal suburbs. Construction lasted from March 2019 to January 2020.

== Stations ==
Name	Chinese	Taiwanese	Hakka	Transfers and notes	Location	
Chenggong	成功	Sêng-kong	Sṳ̀n-kûng	→ Taichung line	Wuri	Taichung
Zhuifen	追分	Tui-hun	Tûi-fûn	→ West Coast line	Dadu	Taichung
