= Lý Thánh Tông =

3rd ruler of the Vietnamese Lý dynasty (1054–1072)

Lý Nhật Tôn
- Emperor of Đại Việt
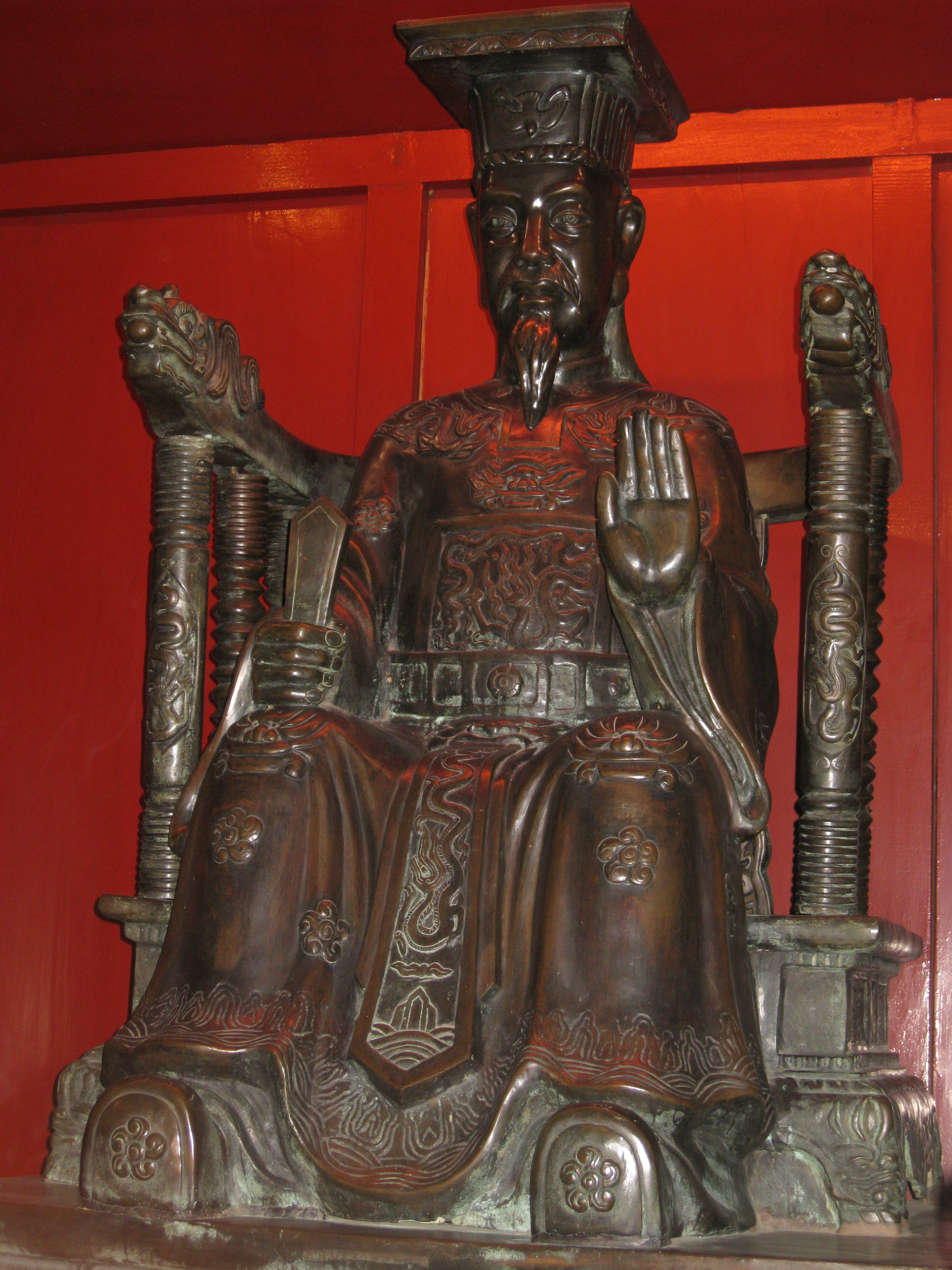
- A statue of emperor Lý Thánh Tông

Emperor of the Lý dynasty
- Reign: 3 November 1054 – 1 February 1072
- Predecessor: Lý Thái Tông
- Successor: Lý Nhân Tông
- Born: 19 March 1023; Long Đức palace, Thăng Long
- Died: 1 February 1072 (aged 49); Hội Tiên palace, Thăng Long
- Burial: Thọ Tomb
- Spouse: 8 concubines, including Empress Thượng Dương; Empress Linh Nhân (靈仁皇太后)(Ỷ Lan)
- Issue: Crown Prince Lý Càn Đức(Lý Nhân Tông); Prince of Minh Nhân; Princess Động Thiên; Princess Thiên Thành; Princess Ngọc Kiều(adoptive)
Names
- Lý Nhật Tôn (李日尊)
Era dates
- Long Thụy Thái Bình (龍瑞太平: 1054–1058); Thiên Thánh Gia Khánh (彰聖嘉慶: 1059–1065); Long Chương Thiên Tự (龍彰天嗣: 1066–1068); Thiên Thống Bảo Tượng (天貺寶象: 1068–1069); Thần Vũ (神武: 1069–1072)
Regnal name
- Pháp Thiên Ứng Vận Sùng Nhân Chí Đức Anh Văn Duệ Vũ Khánh Cảm Long Tường Hiếu Đạo Thánh Thần Hoàng Đế (法天應運崇仁至德英文睿武慶感龍祥孝道聖神皇帝)
Posthumous name
- Ứng Thiên Sùng Nhân Chí Đạo Uy Khánh Long Tường Minh Văn Duệ Vũ Hiếu Đức Thánh Thần Hoàng Đế (應天崇仁至道威慶龍祥明文睿武孝德聖神皇帝)
Temple name
- Thánh Tông (聖宗)
- House: Lý
- Father: Lý Thái Tông
- Mother: Empress Linh Cảm (Mai thị) (靈感皇后枚氏)
- Religion: Buddhism

- Temple name
- Vietnamese alphabet: Lý Thánh Tông
- Chữ Hán: 李聖宗

- Personal name
- Vietnamese alphabet: Lý Nhật Tôn
- Chữ Hán: 李日尊

Lý Thánh Tông (19 March 1023 – 1 February 1072), personal name Lý Nhật Tôn [lǐ ɲə̀t ton], was the third emperor of the Lý dynasty.

Starting his career as the crown prince, Nhật Tôn soon proved his abilities to the royal court. His father, emperor Lý Thái Tông, had readily delegated important tasks to him. He led soldiers against rebels, he judged offenders and presided over the court in his father's absence.

In his reign, Lý Thánh Tông constructed numerous architectural structures in Thăng Long citadel, promoted the agricultural development, reducing some harsh laws and building many Confucianist and Buddhist institutions, most notably the first Temple of Literature in Vietnam (1072). He also fought several successful wars with Champa, resulting in the expansion of Vietnamese territory to the areas which are Quảng Bình Province and Quảng Trị Province today. Lý Thánh Tông incorporated both Sinic and Indic elements into his court. Chinese sources identify Lý Nhật Tôn as the Viet monarch that dared to claim imperial status, which for the Chinese was a direct challenge to their view of the world that prelude to the Song-Viet war in 1070s.

== Early life ==
Lý Nhật Tôn was the eldest son of the second emperor Lý Phật Mã and Queen Mai Thị. He was born on March 30, 1023, at Long Đức palace, during the last years of Lý Thái Tổ's era. According to historical records, Queen Mai Thị had a dream in which the Moon fell into her stomach, resulting in her pregnancy with Nhật Tôn.

Unlike his father and grandfather, he had not lived in the disturbed atmosphere of Hoa Lư. When Lý Thái Tông, was enthroned in April 1028, he appointed Nhật Tôn crown prince. Nhật Tôn came of age witnessing and participating in the exuberance of his father's reign. In 1033, he was conferred crown prince after his father ascended the throne as Prince Khai Hoàng (開皇王).

== Domestic ==
Just after succession in 3rd November 1054, Lý Nhật Tôn shortened the kingdom's name from Đại Cồ Việt to Đại Việt (literally "Great Viet"), initiating the most prosperous epoch throughout the history of Vietnam under that name. He named his era Long Thụy Thái Bình. The 6th year of Emperor Lý Thái Tông’s Sùng Hưng Đại Bảo era became the first year of the Long Thụy Thái Bình era. Around that time, he issued an edict ordering the burning and destruction of all the torture devices used by the Ministry of Justice, then allowed all the concubines serving in Thúy Hoa palace to leave the capital. Thánh Tông then began conferring titles on court officials. Phí Gia Hựu was conferred the title of Văn Minh Điện Đại Học Sĩ (Scholar of Văn Minh Palace), while several generals and military personnel were conferred titles in the royal guards. Lý Đạo Thành was appointed as Grand Preceptor and Quách Kinh Nhật was appointed as Chancellor (thái úy).

In January 1055, he ordered the renovation of the palaces inside the Imperial Citadel. In October this year, as winter brought severe cold, he said to the court officials: "Even though I'm staying in the palace, heated by coal made from the bones of predators and kept warm by a mink-fur coat, I still can't escape the serve cold. So how can the prisoners, who are shackled, suffer from hunger, lack enough clothing to cover themselves, and have not even been convicted, withstand such severe cold? I feel great pity for them all. Therefore, I order the Bureau to provide all prisoners with blankets and mats, along with two meals a day." The historians of Khâm Định Việt Sử Thông Giám Cương Mục sarcastically questioned what corresponding policies he had provided for the citizens instead of the prisoners. He then granted a half reduction in taxes throughout the realm. Around that time, he ordered the construction of Đông Lâm and Tĩnh Lự pagodas in Đông Cưu mountain.

In April 1056, he issued an edict to promote agriculture. He then ordered the construction of the Sùng Khánh Báo Thiên pagoda, and granted 12000 jin of copper for molding the large bells. He then wrote the essay to be carved on those bells. The royal court also hosted an event honoring the Arahant at Thiên An palace. In January 1057, he ordered the construction of the Đại Thắng Tự Thiên stupa, also known as Báo Thiên stupa, which had twelve stories and stood tens of zhàng in height. During the construction time in this year, a golden dragon flew from Quỳnh Lâm Garden to Trường Xuân palace. In October this year, while he traveled to survey Đại Bàng Estuary, a golden dragon suddenly appeared inside his boat. In December this year, he ordered the construction of Thiên Phúc and Thiên Thọ pagodas. He then ordered the construction of golden statues of Brahma (Phạn Vương) and Sakra (Đế Thích) to worship. In the spring of 1058, he ordered the renovation of the Tường Phù gate. By March, the renovation had been completed, along with the construction of an upper floor above the gate. Around that time, he ordered the construction of an octagonal palace named Khổn Thiên in the middle of Kim Minh pond. In May, a golden dragon flew from Long Đức palace to Vĩnh Thọ hall. In June, he ordered the construction of Linh Quang, Kiến Lễ, and Sùng Nghi palaces.

In March 1059, he went on a hunting trip along the Nam Bình river of Lạng Châu province, then paid a visit to his brother-in-law Thân Thiệu Thái, husband of Princess Bình Dương. In that same month, Đại Việt army launched a military campaign into Qinzhou of the Song, then withdrew. He then ordered the construction of Sùng Nghiêm Báo Quốc pagoda in Võ Ninh province. In June, a golden dragon appeared in Vĩnh Thọ palace. In that same month, named his era Chương Thánh Gia Khánh. The 5th year of Long Thụy Thái Bình became the first year of Chương Thánh Gia Khánh. In August, while working at Thủy Tinh palace, he ordered all palace officers who would approach him to wear contemporary Chinese-style headgear and footwear. The tradition of court officials wearing headgear and footwear in Đại Việt began at this time. In August, a golden dragon appeared in Trường Xuân palace. Around that time, he named a stupa in Đồ Sơn to Tường Long, then ordered the construction of Diên Hưng Thổ Hằng gate.

In early 1060, fearing that state secrets might be leaked, he ordered the royal guards of three divisions, along with the cooks and servants, to be barred from entering restricted areas of the palace, communicating with palace servants to obtain information, or exchanging any items with them. Violating this order carried the death penalty, even during periods of amnesty. In February, he went on an elephant-hunting expedition in Tây Nông province (present-day Bắc Kạn), and successfully captured three white elephants. In August, while he traveled to survey Giao Estuary, a golden dragon appeared inside his boat. Following that incident, he renamed this estuary to Thiên Phù. He then ordered to interpret the Champa songs, and learn their drumbeats. Đại Việt musicians then began performing them. During this time, he ordered the construction of the palace beside Dâm Đàm pond so that he could watch fishing as a form of entertainment. In February 1061, 12 young women were recruited as concubines for the royal court. At the same time, La Thuận province presented a white elephant to the royal court. After quelling the rebellion in the mountainous region of Sa Đãng, Thánh Tông went to Ba Sơn to pray for a son. A golden dragon appeared on the ritual platform. In early 1062, Gia Lâm district presented the royal court a monstrous turtle with 3 legs and 6 pupils in its eye. In September, people found gold leaf in Vũ Kiện cave and silver in Hạ Liên county.

In June 1063, he ordered the construction of Động Tiên palace to the East of the citadel. At the same time, the royal court was presented with a white turtle. Thánh Tông was 40 years old at the time. He then ordered the construction of another pagoda in Tiêu Sơn to pray for a son. People found pearls at the site and presented them to the royal court. According to a legend recorded in historical accounts, Tiêu Sơn pagoda was where the mother of former emperor Lý Công Uẩn once visited, met the demigod then copulated with him to give birth to Lý Công Uẩn. In December, Thánh Tông ordered the construction of Ngân Hà gate.

In 1063, at 40 years old and still without a son and having visited shrines and temples throughout the kingdom to pray for an heir, he traveled to the Pháp Vân pagoda, about thirty kilometers east of Thăng Long at the ancient site of Luy Lâu, where Shi Xie had governed at the turn of the third century. This was among the first Buddhist temples to be built in the Red River Delta. Thánh Tông found interest on a young girl named Ỷ Lan who ignored the king's hubbub while continued working on the mulberry farm, while other young ladies gathered around him. He then took her as queen and loved her dearly. Three years later she gave birth for prince Lý Càn Đức. Around that time, Thánh Tông sent a court servant named Nguyễn Bông to perform a ritual to pray for a child in Thánh Chúa pagoda (present-day in Dịch Vọng village, Từ Liêm district). The monk at that pagoda then taught Bông the art of reincarnation, which he subsequently practiced. Thánh Tông then discovered this and sentenced Bông to death, having him beheaded in front of the pagoda. After this incident, Ỷ Lan became pregnant.

In April 1064, Thánh Tông held a court at Thiên Khánh Palace. As his daughter, Princess Động Thiên, also followed him to assist him, he pointed to her then and said to the courtiers: "I love my daughter as much as I love my people. I feel sorry when ignorant people committed crimes. Therefore, from now on, please consider granting a pardon for crimes ranging from petty offenses to felonies." In May, the royal court began the construction of Bố Hải Khẩu royal residence. In February 1065, Thánh Tông travelled to Bố Hải Khẩu royal residence to personally plow the ceremonial field to encourage agriculture. In August, he inaugurated Thượng Lâm Garden. A golden dragon flew from Đại Minh palace to Hội Nguyên palace, then appeared in Bố Hải royal residence. That winter, another golden dragon appeared in Diêu Linh palace, then at Du Thiền, the royal upper chamber where Empress Ỷ Lan was staying.

On 25th January 1066, prince Lý Càn Đức was born. One day later, Càn Đức was appointed crown prince. Thánh Tông then renamed his era Long Chương Thiên Tự. The 8th year of Chương Thánh Gia Khánh became the first year of Long Chương Thiên Tự. In March, a golden dragon appeared in the crown prince palace. In September, Thánh Tông granted a cancellation of the high taxes. During this time, he ordered general Quách Mãn to construct a tower on Tiên Du mountain. Merchants from Indonesia presented glowing jade to the royal court and were bestowed 10000 quan (貫, strings of cash) by the court. In November, he married off his daughter, Princess Thiên Thành to Thân Đạo Nguyên, son of his younger sister, Princess Bình Dương, making the couple first cousins.

In 1067, Ngụy Trọng Hòa and Đặng Thể Tư were appointed royal legal officials to serve in the Protectorate. The Protectorate was initially a prefectural office established to govern the whole Jiaozhi during the Tang dynasty, in the Third Era of Northern Domination. From the Đinh to Lý dynasty, the Protectorate was retained, but its role was limited to carrying out law enforcement. Junior royal servants, scribes (thư gia), ten of whom were promoted to law officers. Trọng Hòa and Thể Tư received a monthly salary of 50 quan, 200 sheaves of rice, and with fermented fishes. The law officers received a salary of 20 quan and 100 sheaves of rice. Thánh Tông believed that these benefits could help curb bribery among the royal servants. This marked the very first time in the Lý dynasty that the law officers received a regular salary. Before this event, court officials, including law officers, didn't receive a monthly salary. Their income came solely from the royal reward.

In February 1068, Empress Ỷ Lan gave birth to another prince. Thánh Tông conferred upon the new born prince the title of Duke of Minh Nhân. Chân Đăng province presented the royal courts with 2 white elephants, and Lạng Châu presented another ones. Following this event, Thánh Tông renamed the era Thiên Huống Bảo Tượng, meaning "God bestowed the white elephant". The 2nd year of Long Chương Thiên Tự thus became the first year of Thiên Huống Bảo Tượng. Đô Lạp district presented another white elephant and a white sparrow. Champa also presented the royal court with a white elephant, then quickly conducted raids along the border. Historians considered this event to be the root cause of the war with Champa the following year.

It appears that it was Lý Nhật Tôn who first conferred upon Lý Công Uẩn and Lý Phật Mã posthumous titles derived from Chinese dynastic usage.

In order to educate people with Chinese classics, in 1070 Thánh Tông authorized the construction of Văn Miếu, the Temple of Literature, a scholarly shrine and archive in Thăng Long that was stocked with clay statues of the Duke of Zhou and of Confucius and his followers and paintings of seventy-two other disciples of Confucius. Thánh Tông also relied on his chief minister Lý Đạo Thành to educate his four-year-old son Lý Càn Đức in Chinese classics.

== Foreign relations ==
In January 1055, Champa paid tribute. In October of the same year, Thánh Tông sent envoys to the Song to inform them of the death of emperor Thái Tông. The Song then sent envoys to pay a condolence visit then conferred on Lý Thánh Tông the title of "King of Jiaozhi Province" (Giao Chỉ Quận Vương). In January 1056, Chenla paid tribute. In January 1057, Thánh Tông sent an envoy to the Song to pay tribute, which included a qilin. Upon seeing this, Sima Guang commented: "If it's a real qilin but has arrived at not the right time, then it isn't a good omen. But if it isn't a qilin, then this incident will allow the foreigners to make fun of us. So let's treat them [the Đại Viêt envoys] well then asked them to bring it [the qilin] back."

In December 1057, Champa paid tribute, then paid tribute again toward the end of 1059 and once more in 1060. In December 1063, Champa paid tribute. In January 1064, Thánh Tông sent envoys to the Song to congratulate on the inauguration Zhao Zongshi on his enthronement as Emperor Yingzong in the previous year. Later, in October, the Song conferred Thánh Tông the title of "Đồng Bình Chương Sự". In the winter of 1065, Champa paid tribute with a white rhinoceros.

In February 1067, Heishui and Laos paid tribute with gold, silver, agarwood, rhinoceros horns, ivory and other precious local products. Later, the Song conferred Thánh Tông the title of "Khai phủ nghi đồng tam ti", then "Nam Bình Vương". In 1068, when the royal court had received multiple white elephants as tribute from several provinces, Champa also presented the royal court with a white elephant. Soon afterward, they conducted raids along the border of Đại Việt.

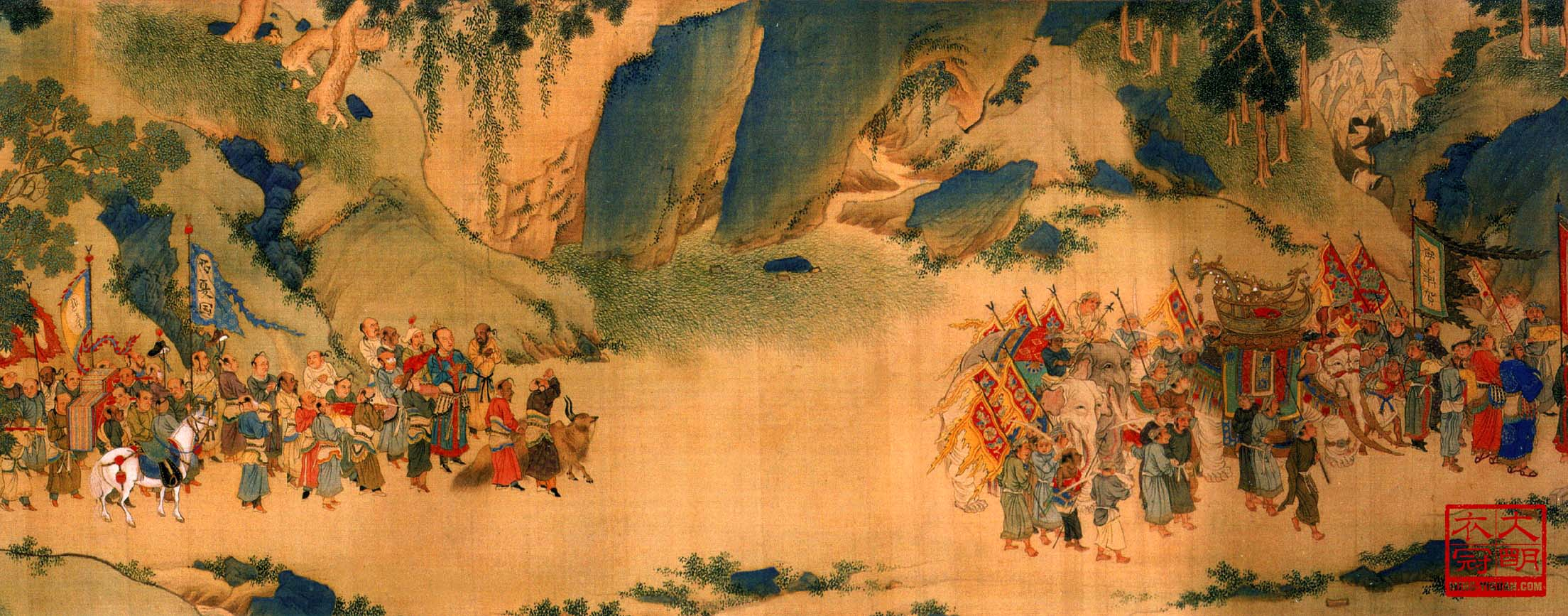
Depiction of Tanguts and Vietnamese embassies to Sung China

According to the Chinese, Lý Nhật Tôn violated propriety by arrogantly proclaiming himself an emperor. Because of recently violence in the borders, local Song officials went so far as to conspire with the Cham king to put pressure on the Vietnamese. A Vietnamese embassy was permitted to offer tribute to the court of Renzong in Kaifeng, arriving on 8 February 1063 to deliver gifts, including nine tamed elephants. The king sent a second embassy to the Sung court in 1067 to congratulate Shenzong's coronation, and received gifts from the Sung emperor including a golden belt, silver ingots, 300 bolts of silk, two horses, a saddle inlaid with gold and silver plating.

As Champa constantly harassed the area near the border between the two nations and sometimes intruded deeply to loot, in 1069 Lý Thánh Tông himself led an seaborne invasion of Champa. He defeated the Cham army, burned Vijaya, and captured the king of Champa, Rudravarman III on Khmer territories. Rudravarman III implored Lý Thánh Tông to release him in exchange for three areas, known as Địa Lý, Ma Linh, and Bố Chính. These now form part of Quảng Bình Province and Quảng Trị Province.

Nhật Tôn's victorious army brought back thousands more Cham prisoners and resettled them near capital Thăng Long. These captives contributed Cham music to Viet court; they included Tao Tang, a Chinese monk who had been living at the Cham court. Under the guidance of his new royal patron Nhật Tôn, he established Đại Việt's third Thiền Buddhist sect. Alongside the popular Vinītaruci sect that Lý Công Uẩn had favored and the more ascetic and scholarly Võ Ngôn Thông sect of Lý Phật Mã, the kingdom acquired a princely order that was patronized by later Lý monarchs and catered to court interests, but also incorporated more cosmopolitan influences, including elements of Chinese Buddhism.

== Military affairs ==
Upon his enthronement, Thánh Tông appointed several military personnel and conferred the titles on them in the royal guards. He also renamed several divisions of the royal guard, and established a new division named Tả Hữu Long Dực, with 100 guards assigned to each unit of the division. Around mid-year 1057, A Châu ward rebelled against the royal court, but historical accounts don't provide any further details about how the rebellion ended.

In March 1059, Thánh Tông ordered a military campaign into Qinzhou of the Song. Đại Việt's army demonstrated its military power before withdrawn. Thánh Tông's royal court justified the campaign as "a punishment for the arrogance of the Song." This incident marked the first military campaign in Thánh Tông's reign. The historians of Đại Việt Sử Ký Tiền Biên expressed concern about this incident. They argued that the Song had just conferred Thánh Tông four year earlier in 1055, and there were no records of border skirmishes in Đại Việt's historical chronicles at the time. They therefore questioned the reason for Thánh Tông's hostility toward the Song and its alleged arrogance. They then hypothesized that this incident was an imitation of Thánh Tông's father Thái Tông in military power demonstration to the neighboring states. The Nguyễn dynasty historians also commented this military campaign was irrational.

However, Westerns historians in the late 20th and early 21th centuries had a different interpretation of this military campaign. According to James A. Anderson and Michael McGrath, after Nong Zhigao's rebellion was suppressed in 1055, the Guangnan West Circuit Fiscal Commissioner, Wang Han (fl. 1043–1063), feared that Nong Zhigao's kinsmen Nùng Tông Đán intended to plunder the region after he crossed the Song border in 1057. Wang Han took a personal visit to Nùng Tông Đán's camp and spoke with Nong Zhigao's son, explaining that seeking "Interior Dependency" status would alienate them from the Vietnamese, but if they remained outside of China proper they could safely act as loyal frontier militia. A local Song official, Xiao Zhu, agitated for military action against Thăng Long to settle the border question. They secretly trained military units and sheltered refugees from the Vietnamese side, including army deserters. The contradiction between the pacific pronouncements of the Song court and the devious, provocative policy of local Song officials angered Lý Thánh Tông. That led to the punitive attack in 1059 across the border, in which Thánh Tông declared his hate for "Sung's untrustworthiness".

In August of that same year 1059, Thánh Tông reorganized and named all the units of the nation army as Ngự Long, Vũ Thắng, Long Dực, Thần Điện, Bổng Thánh, Bảo Thắng, Hùng Lược, and Vạn Tiệp, with each unit has a left and right wing. All soldiers had the words "Thiên tử quân" (Tianzi's soldier) inscribed on their foreheads. He also equipped them with cavalries and catapults. A draft was carried out in the capital at this time.

In early 1060, Lạng Châu chieftain Thân Thiệu Thái invaded Nanning in order to capture the deserters who fled into Song territory. He also captured the Song commander Dương Bảo Tài, along with his soldiers, horses, and buffaloes. In July this year, the Song launched a military incursion into Đại Việt and were defeated. They then requested negotiations with Đại Việt in Nanning, with Jing Yu (余靖), Deputy Minister of Personnel of the Song, taking part. Thánh Tông appointed Phí Gia Hựu to represent Đại Việt at the negotiations. Jing Yu presented Hựu with precious gifts as a bribe then handed him a decree requesting the release of Dương Bảo Tài. Upon receiving that decree, Thánh Tông rejected the request. Historian Tarling also stated that, after a year or so of attacks and counter-attacks, in which the local Sung officials fared poorly, a parley between Sung and Vietnamese envoys produced a temporary calm as some activist Sung officials were dismissed and the Sung court officially accepted Thăng Long's explanation of events. However, Đại Việt Sử ký tiền biên records these Song-related affairs and considers them unofficial account rather than official records. According to it, after Thân Thiệu Thái's invasion of Nanning in 1060, Emperor Renzong issued an imperial edict ordering Guizhou governor Xiāo Gù, Transport Commissioner Sòng Xián, and general Lǐ Shīzhōng to plan to a raid on Đại Việt in retaliation. In the end, Jing Yu was appointed to lead the campaign against Đại Việt. Jing Yu also sent an edict to Champa requesting them to join with the Liangguang army in the campaign. Thánh Tông then sent an edict to request Emperor Renzong to prohibit all Song officials from harassing the border, and advised him not to deploy troops. Emperor Renzong then agreed and that military campaign was subsequently canceled. Đại Việt Sử ký tiền biên emphasized that this account differed from the official records and therefore should be used only as a reference.

In 1061, people in the mountainous region Sa Đãng rebelled against the royal court. Thánh Tông personally led a campaign to quell that rebellion. Around that time, 5 districts in Ái Châu and Giang Long rebelled, but historical accounts don't provide any further details about how that rebellion ended. In October 1064, people in Sa Ma (present-day Mãi Đà, Hòa Bình) rebelled. Thánh Tông personally led a campaign to quell that rebellion. A golden dragon appeared in his ship after the campaign. In July 1065, people in Mang Quán province (present-day Sơn La) rebelled, and he personally led a campaign to suppress the rebellion, forcing them to surrender.

In 1068, Thánh Tông ordered the war boats to be repaired. In making plans for the Champa campaign he relied on Lý Thường Kiệt (1019–1105), the ranking military officer at court.

According to Vân đài loạn ngữ by Lê Quý Đôn, Tài Yánqìng, a Song general, presented Thánh Tông's military organization to Emperor Shenzong and proposed that it be adopted by the Song. Shenzong praised Yánqìng for his proposal.

== Religious activities ==
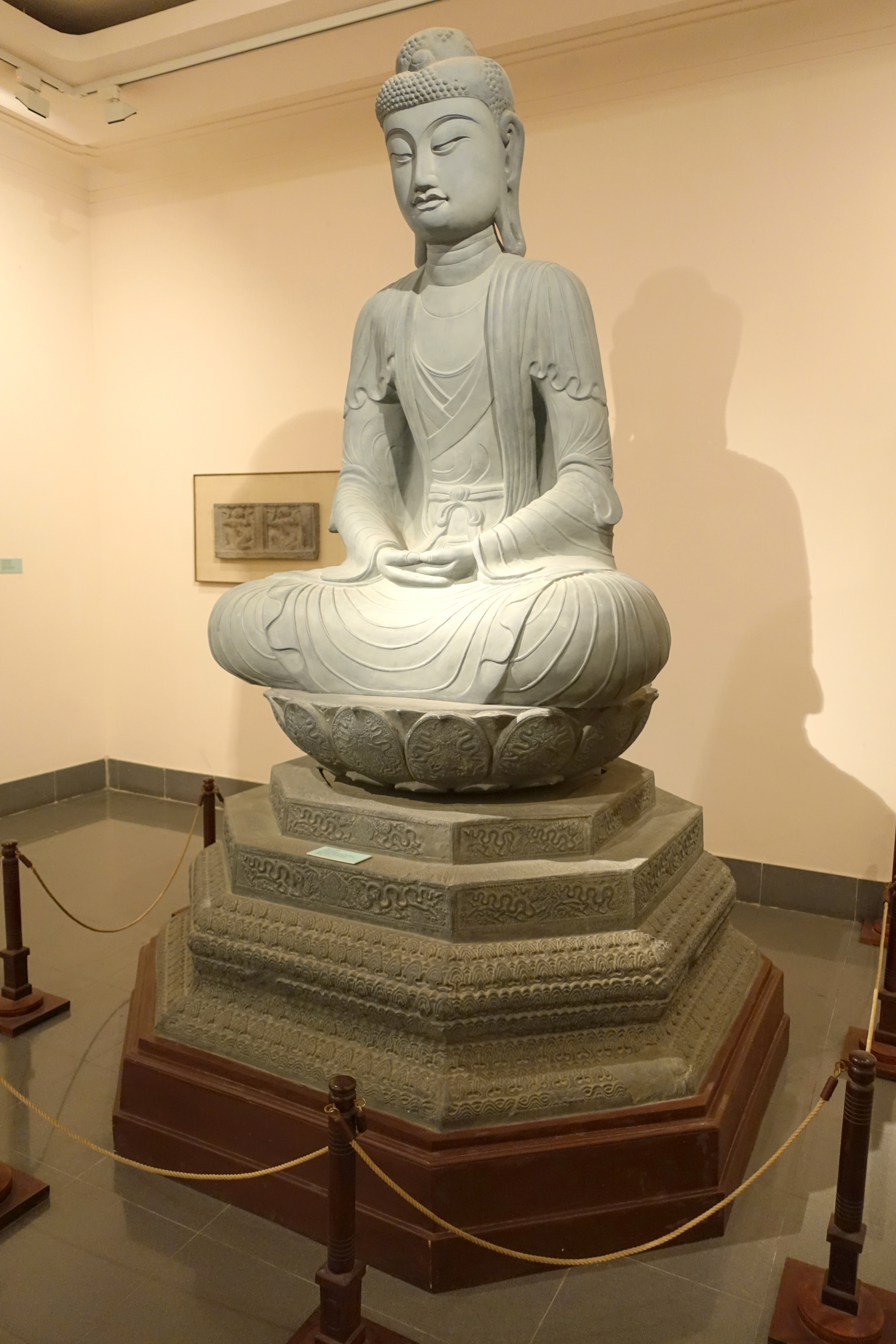
Bodhisattva statue, dated 1057 AD from Phật Tích temple, Bắc Ninh Province, attributed to Lý Thánh Tông

In 1057 Thánh Tông erected a Buddha statue in Thăng Long as the reincarnation of a pantheon of spirits, including the ancient Lạc saint Gióng and the Chinese god of war, Chen Wu, while several years later the minister Lý Đạo Thành erected a Buddha statue and established a garden dedicated to a Bodhisattva in the grounds of the provincial Temple of Literature in Nghệ An. In the capital, Thánh Tông ordered the construction of a temple called Phạn Vương Đế Thích for the worship of Indra (Đế Thích). Also in the same year he constructed a royal cult linked Hindu-Buddhist king of the god Indra as well as Brahma (Phạn Vương); every year, before the Tết lunar new year two days, Vietnamese kings and his entourage would go to the shrine of Indra to worship. He also had two temples Thiên Phúc and Thiên Thọ, golden statues of Brahma and Sakra to worship. In early 1072, Thánh Tông went up to the mount of Tản Viên to worship the mountain spirit.

== Death ==
In January 1072, he suddenly died at the age of 49, having ruled for 17 years. During his rule, he used 5 era names:

- Long Thụy Thái Bình (1054–1058)
- Chương Thánh Gia Khánh (1059–1065)
- Long Chương Thiên Tự (1066–1067)
- Thiên Huống Bảo Tượng (1068)
- Thần Vũ (1069–1072)

== Assessment ==
Although Lý Thánh Tông established many Buddhist architectural works, the American historian John K. Whitmore considered that Thánh Tông did not seem to have been much engaged with either the Buddhist or the spirit world, unlike his father Thái Tông and grandfather Thái Tổ. Relating to the spirit world, however, Việt sử lược recorded multiple mythological accounts involving dragons during his reign.

== Family ==
- Parents
  - Lý Phật Mã (李佛瑪, 1000 – 1054)
  - Empress Mai
- Wives: Upon his enthronement, Thánh Tông officially recognized 8 queens, with Empress Thượng Dương is the mostly known. He then married Lady Ỷ Lan (倚蘭) (or Lê Khiết Nương 黎潔娘), making the total of 9 quueens.
- Children
  - Lý Càn Đức (李乾德, 1066 – 1128), first son
  - Lý Càn Quyết, second son
  - Sùng Hiền Hầu
  - Princess Động Thiên
  - Princess Thiên Thành
  - Lý Thị Ngọc Kiều (李氏玉嬌, 1042 – 1113), adopted daughter

Preceded by Lý Thái Tông	Emperor of the Lý dynasty 1054–1072	Succeeded by Lý Nhân Tông
