= Pháp Hiền =

Pháp Hiền (died 626) was a Vietnamese Buddhist monk notable in the early history of Buddhism in Vietnam, Vietnamese Thiền in Vietnam.

Pháp Hiền studied under Quán Duyên, a Thiền master at Chùa Quán Vân, or Phap-van Temple, then under the Indian monk Vinītaruci. After the latter's death, Pháp Hiền built the Chúng Thiện Temple at a mountain named Thiên Phúc or Tiên Du, northwest of Luy Lâu.
