= Minh Đạo =

Minh Đạo may refer to:

- Minh Đạo (1042–1043), era name used by Lý Thái Tông
- Minh Đạo or Ngũ chi Minh Đạo, a group of five Sino-Vietnamese religions, see Vietnamese folk religion#Minh Đạo
- Minh Đạo, Bắc Ninh, a commune in Tiên Du District, Bắc Ninh, Vietnam

== See also ==
- Ming Dao, Taiwanese actor
- Mingdao (disambiguation)
