= Mingdao =

Mingdao may refer to:

- Mingdao (1032–1033), era name used by Emperor Renzong of Song
- Empress Mingdao (died 237), empress of Cao Wei
- Yongjia Xuanjue (665–713), Chinese Buddhist monk, dharma name Mingdao
- MingDao University, a university in Changhua County, Taiwan
- Mingdao High School, a high school in Taichung, Taiwan

== See also ==
- Ming Dao (born 1980), Taiwanese actor
- Minh Đạo (disambiguation)
