= Zhuifen railway station =

Railway station in Taichung, Taiwan

Zhuifen Station 追分車站
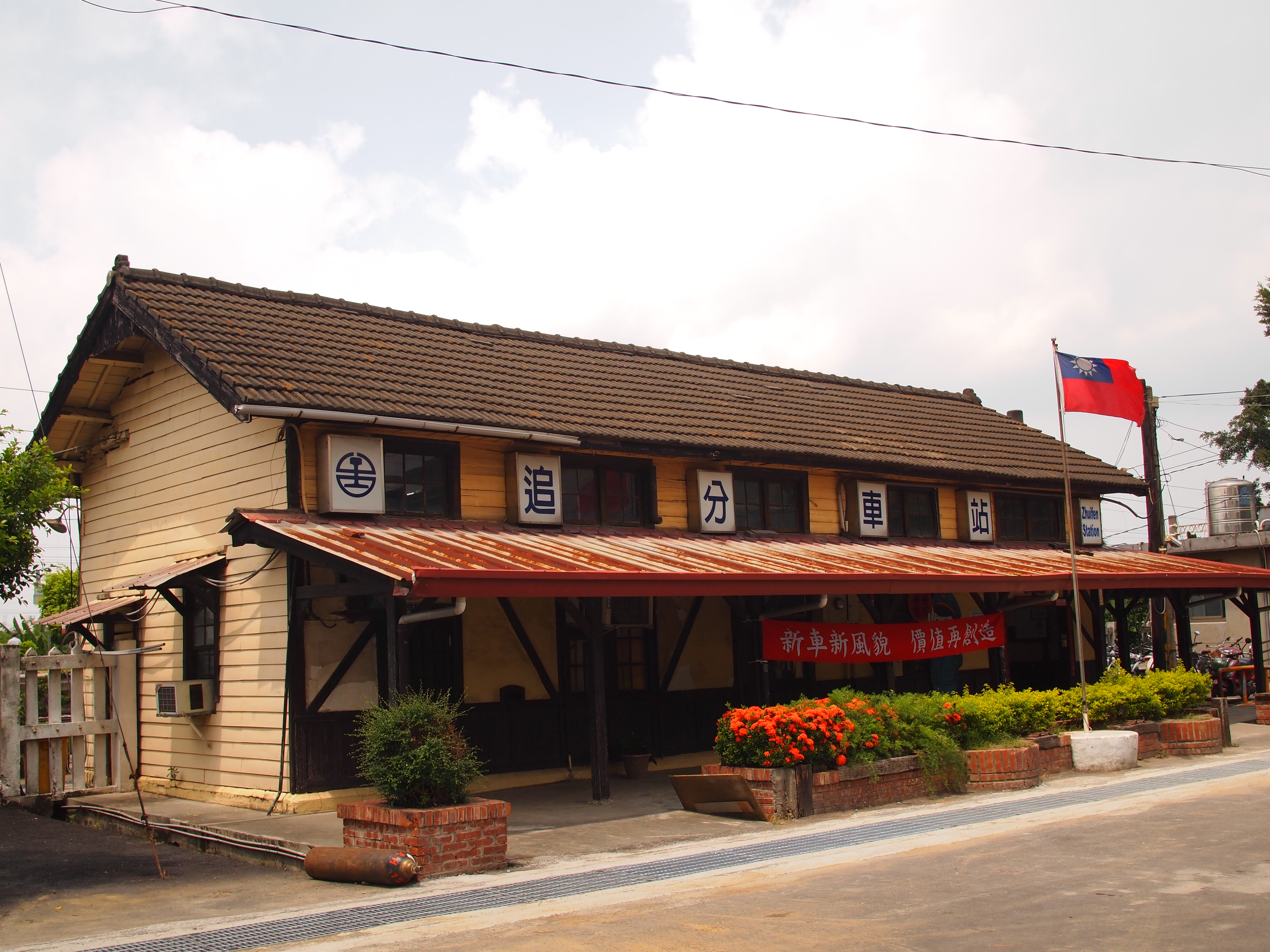

General information
- Location: Dadu, Taichung, Taiwan
- Coordinates: 24°07′13.0″N 120°34′14.9″E
- System: Train station
- Owner: Taiwan Railway
- Operator: Taiwan Railway
- Line: Western Trunk line
- Train operators: Taiwan Railway

Construction
- Structure type: Wooden

History
- Opened: 11 October 1922

Passengers
- 1,005 daily (2024)

Services
Preceding station	Taiwan Railway	Following station
Dadu towards Zhunan	Western Trunk line (coastal)	Changhua Terminus
Location

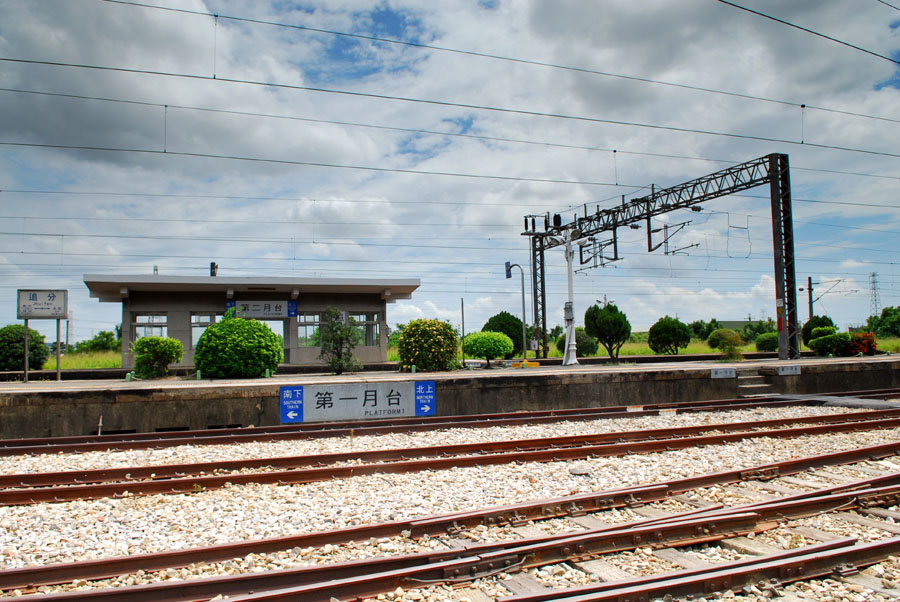
Zhuifen station platform

Zhuifen (Chinese: 追分車站; Hanyu Pinyin: Zhuīfēn chēzhàn; Tongyong Pinyin: Jhueifen Chejhàn) is a railway station on Taiwan Railway Western Trunk line located in Dadu District, Taichung, Taiwan.

Train tickets from Zhuifen station to Chenggong station via the Chengzhui line are considered auspicious among students for having the double meaning of "success in getting a good grade." If pronounced slightly differently, it could also mean "success in getting married."

Passengers had to cross the railway tracks to the platforms under instruction by railway staff prior to an underpass being built at the end of 2022.

== History ==
The station was opened on 11 October 1922.

== Structure ==
There are two island platforms at Zhuifen Station.

This is a wooden station, and is now one of the city's historical sites.

== Service ==
Zhuifen Station is only serviced by local trains (區間車).

== See also ==
- List of railway stations in Taiwan
