= Xinwuri railway station =

Railway station located in Taichung, Taiwan

Xinwuri 新烏日
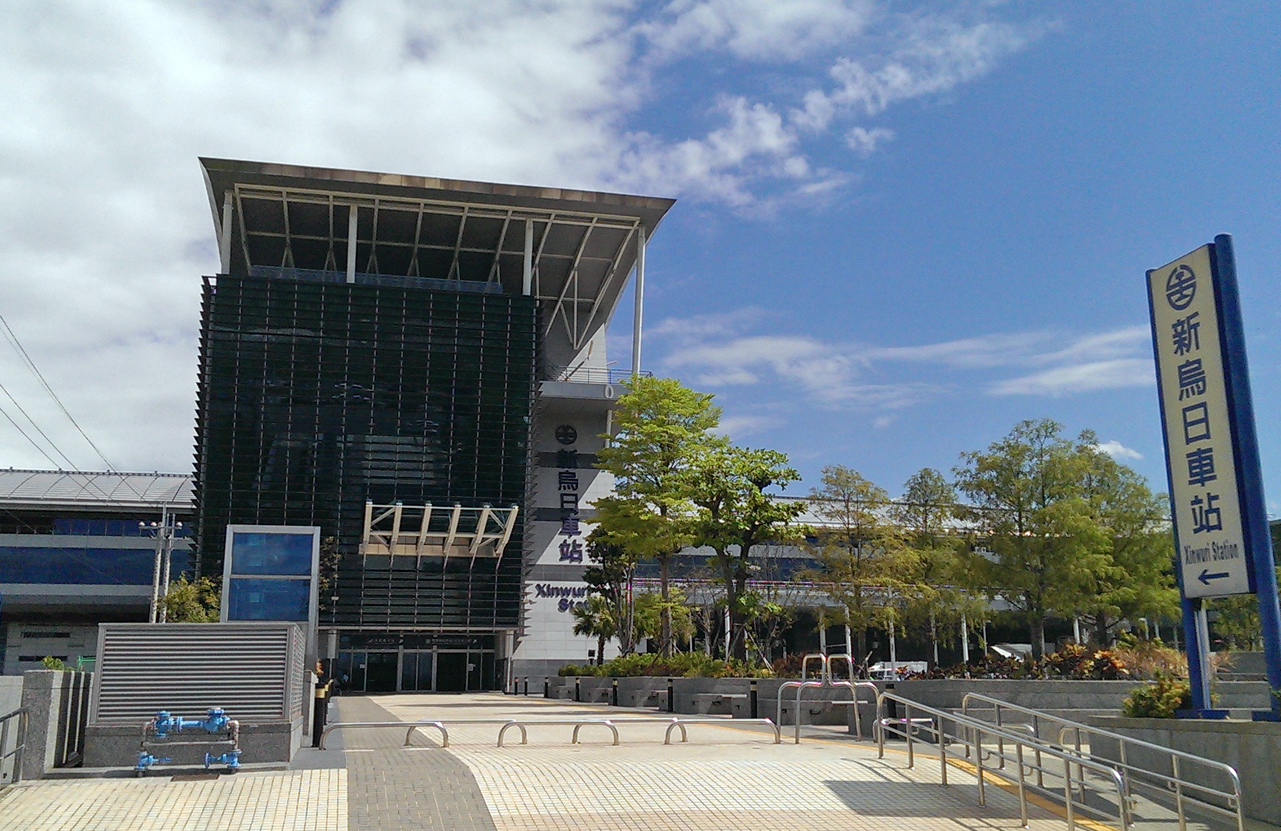

Chinese name
- Traditional Chinese: 新烏日
- Literal meaning: New Wuri
Transcriptions
Standard Mandarin
- Hanyu Pinyin: Xīnwūrì
- Bopomofo: ㄒㄧㄣ ㄨ ㄖˋ

General information
- Location: 26 Gaotie 1st Rd; Wuri District, Taichung; Taiwan
- Coordinates: 24.1099°N 120.6143°E
- System: TR railway station
- Line: Western Trunk line
- Distance: 201.3 km to Keelung
- Connections: Local bus; Coach

Construction
- Structure type: Ground level

Other information
- Station code: 3340; T134 (statistical)
- Classification: Second class (Chinese: 二等)
- Website: www.railway.gov.tw/tra-tip-web/tip/tip00H/tipH41/viewStaInfo/3340

History
- Opened: 26 October 2006

Passengers
- 2017: 4.591 million per year ▲10.38%
- Rank: 27 out of 228

Services
Preceding station	Taiwan Railway	Following station
Wuri towards Keelung	Western Trunk line	Chenggong towards Kaohsiung
Location
- Location within Taiwan

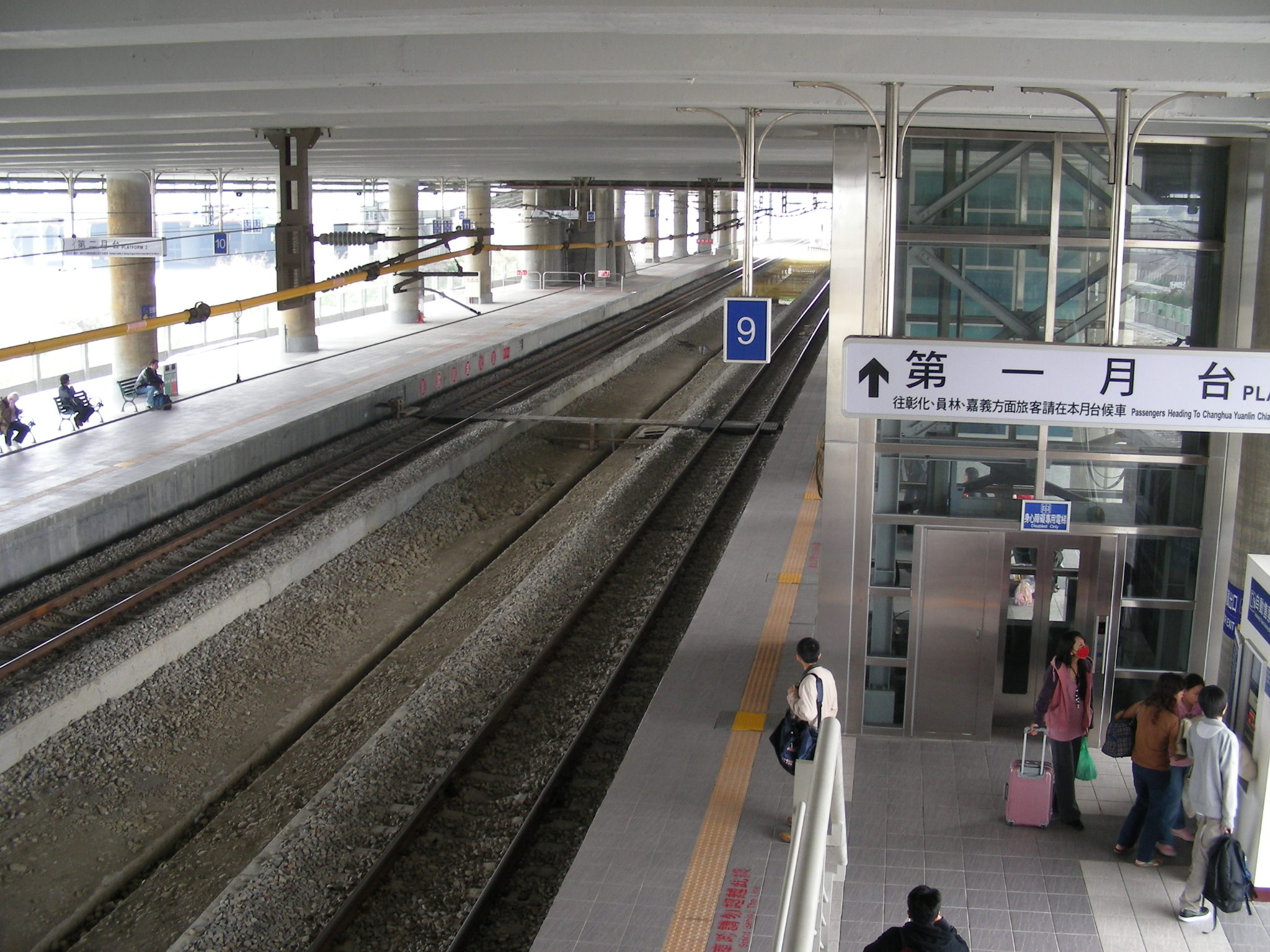
Xinwuri station platforms

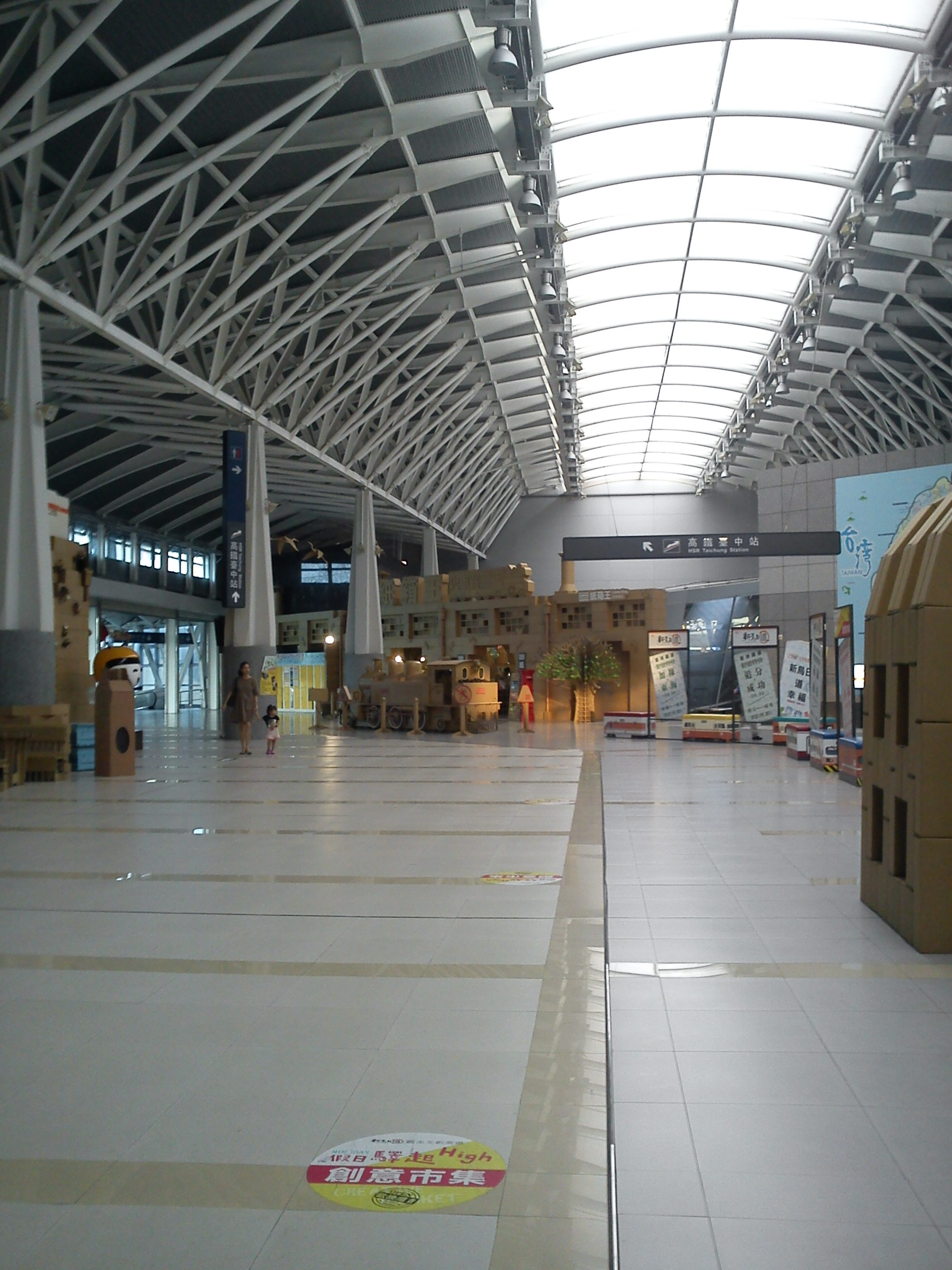
Xinwuri station hall

Xinwuri (Chinese: 新烏日車站; pinyin: Xīnwūrì Chēzhàn) is a railway station in Wuri District, Taichung, Taiwan on Taiwan Railway's Taichung line. It is connected to Taichung HSR station via a bridge, and also has a connection to HSR Taichung MRT station.

== Overview ==
The station consists of a large building linked to the HSR station via a bridge. There are automatic ticketing machines and ticketing staff, shops, and restaurants within the building. Bus stations and parking facilities are shared with the HSR station.

== Station layout ==
2F	Concourse level	Ticketing and ticket gates Passageway (to THSR Taichung Station)
1F	Platform level	Platform 1: toward Kaohsiung/Zhunan (Chengjhuei line, Coastal line); Platform 2: toward Taichung, Taipei, Keelung

1	1A	■ West Coast line (southbound, through traffic)	Toward Changhua, Douliu, Chiayi
2	1B	■ West Coast line (southbound)	Toward Changhua, Douliu, Chiayi
2	1B	■ West Coast line (Coastal line northbound, passes through Chengjhuei line)	Toward Dajia, Zhunan, Hsinchu
2	1B	■ Jiji line (southbound)	Toward Jiji, Checheng
3	2A	■ West Coast line (northbound)	Toward Taichung, Fengyuan, Miaoli, Hsinchu
3	2A	■ West Coast line (Coastal line southbound, passes through Chengjhuei line)	Toward Taichung, Fengyuan, Houli
3	2A	■ Jiji line (northbound)	Toward Taichung
4	2B	■ West Coast line (northbound, through traffic)	Toward Taichung, Fengyuan, Miaoli, Hsinchu

== Around the station ==
- Rainbow Village

== See also ==
- List of railway stations in Taiwan
