= Dadu railway station (Taiwan) =

Railway station in Dadu, Taichung, Taiwan

Dadu Station 大肚車站
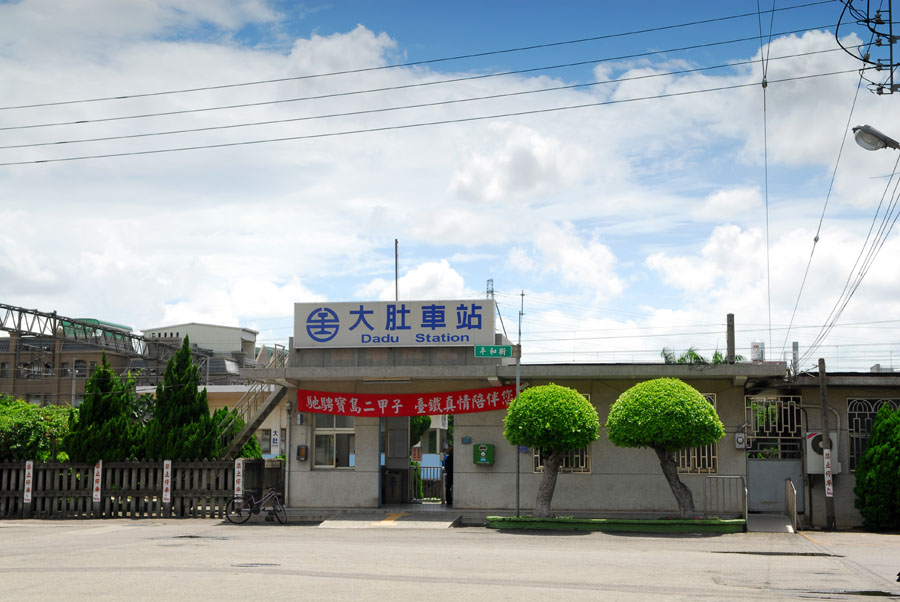

General information
- Location: Dadu, Taichung, Taiwan
- Coordinates: 24°09′14.4″N 120°32′32.6″E
- System: Train station
- Owner: Taiwan Railway
- Operator: Taiwan Railway
- Line: Western Trunk line
- Train operators: Taiwan Railway

History
- Opened: 25 December 1920

Passengers
- 1,524 daily (2024)
Location

Dadu (Chinese: 大肚車站; pinyin: Dàdù Chēzhàn) is a railway station on Taiwan Railway West Coast line (Coastal line) located in Dadu District, Taichung, Taiwan.

== History ==
The station was opened on 15 December 1920.

== Structure ==
There is an island platform at the station.

There is neither an overpass nor an underpass at the station, so passengers must follow staff instructions when crossing the tracks.

== Service ==
As a minor station, Dadu station is primarily serviced by local trains (區間車). A few times per day a Chu-Kuang Express (莒光號) or a Tzu-Chiang Limited Express (自強號) stops at the station.

== Around the station ==
- Huangxi Academy

== See also ==
- List of railway stations in Taiwan

Preceding station	Taiwan Railway	Following station
Longjing towards Keelung	Western Trunk line	Zhuifen towards Pingtung
