= Chenggong railway station =

Railway station in Wuri, Taichung, Taiwan

Chenggong Station 成功車站
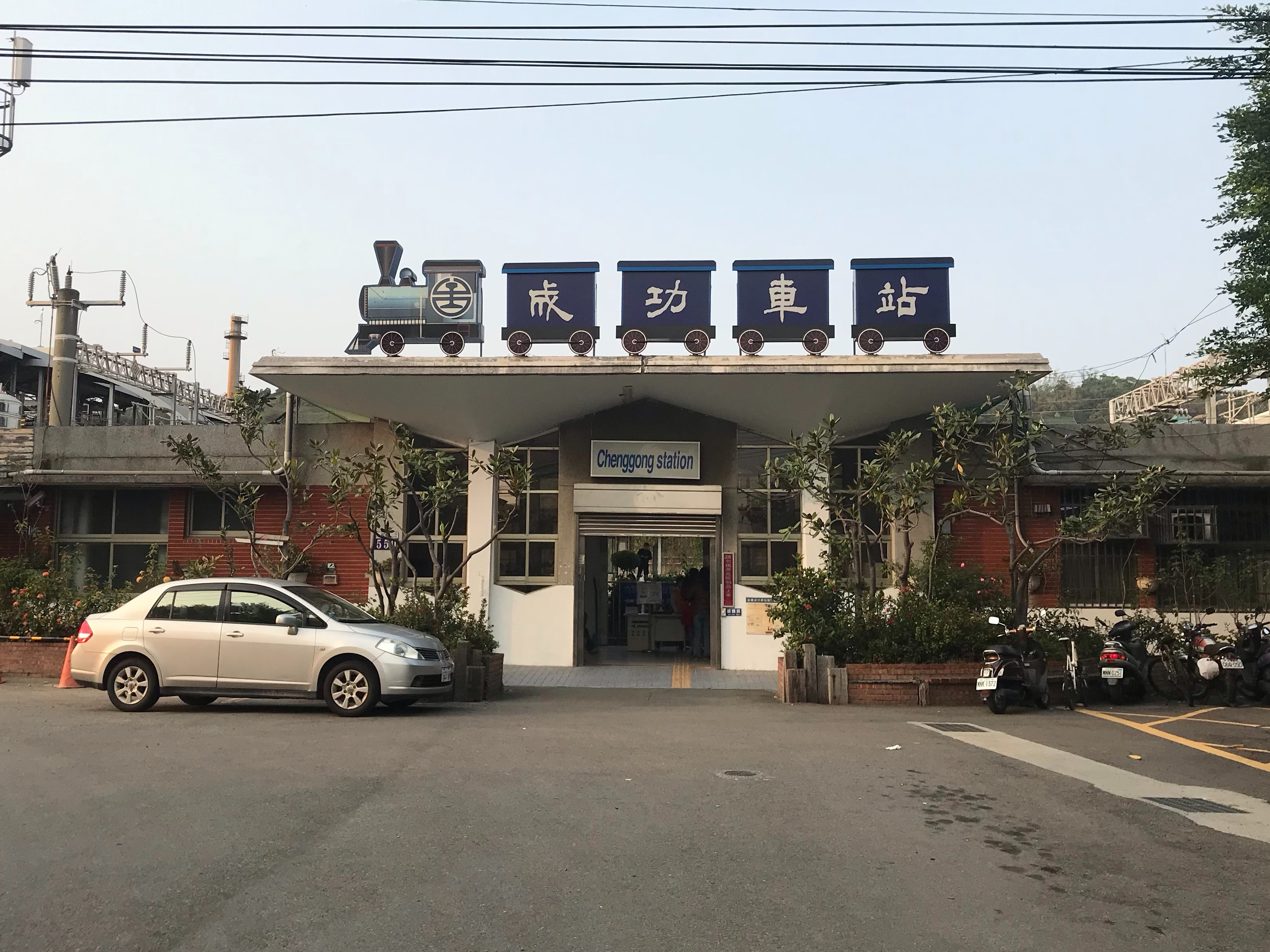

General information
- Location: Wuri, Taichung, Taiwan
- Coordinates: 24°06′51.5″N 120°35′26.1″E
- System: TR railway station
- Owner: Taiwan Railway Corporation
- Operator: Taiwan Railway Corporation
- Line: Taichung
- Train operators: Taiwan Railway

History
- Opened: 15 May 1905

Passengers
- 1,805 daily (2024)

Services
Preceding station	Taiwan Railway	Following station
Xinwuri towards Keelung	Western Trunk line	Changhua towards Kaohsiung
Location

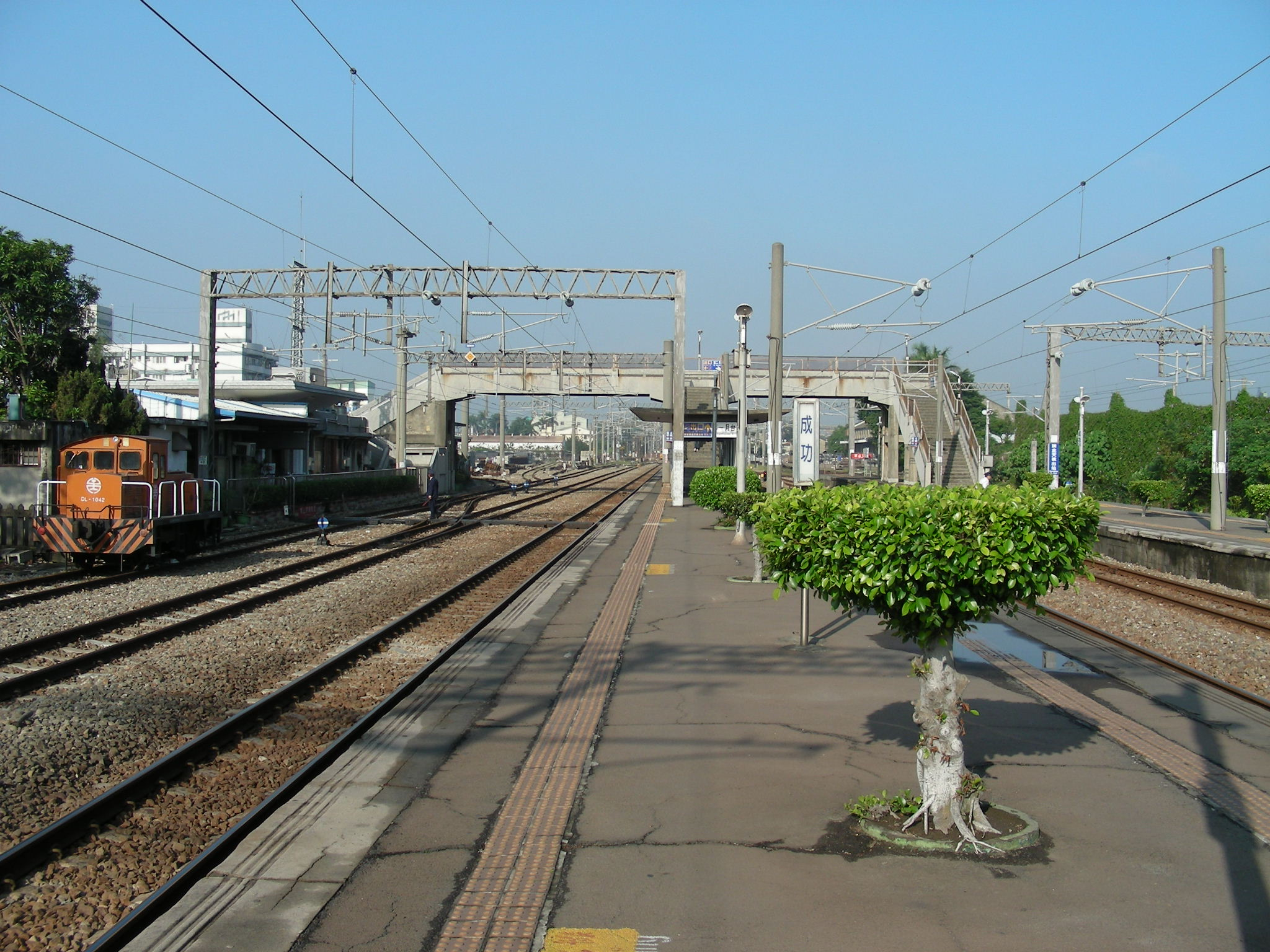
Chenggong station platform

Chenggong (Chinese: 成功車站; pinyin: Chénggōng Chēzhàn) is a railway station on Taiwan Railway's Taichung line located in Wuri District, Taichung, Taiwan. The name is derived from the nearby Chenggongling military base.

Train tickets from Zhuifen station to Chenggong station via the Chengzhui line are popular among students for having the double meaning of "success in getting a good grade" in Mandarin Chinese. If pronounced slightly differently, it could also mean "success in getting married."

== History ==
The station was opened on 15 May 1905.

== Structure ==
1	1A	■West Coast line (southward)	To Changhua, Douliu, Chiayi
2	1B	■West Coast line (northward)	To Taichung, Fengyuan, Miaoli, Hsinchu
3	2A	■West Coast line (southbound trains pass)	To Changhua, Douliu, Chiayi direction
3	2A	■West Coast line (northbound trains pass)	To Taichung, Fengyuan, Miaoli, Hsinchu
4	2B	■West Coast line (going northward, and passing through Chengzhui line to Coast line)	To Dajia, Zhunan, Hsinchu
4	2B	■West Coast line (going southward, and passing through Chengzhui line to Coast line)	To Taichung, Fengyuan, Houli

== Service ==
As a minor station, Chenggong Station is primarily serviced by local trains. A few times per day, a Chu-Kuang Express or Tzu-Chiang Limited Express service stops at the station.

== See also ==
- List of railway stations in Taiwan
