= Huangxi Academy =

Former tutorial academy in Dadu, Taichung, Taiwan

Huangxi Academy 磺溪書院
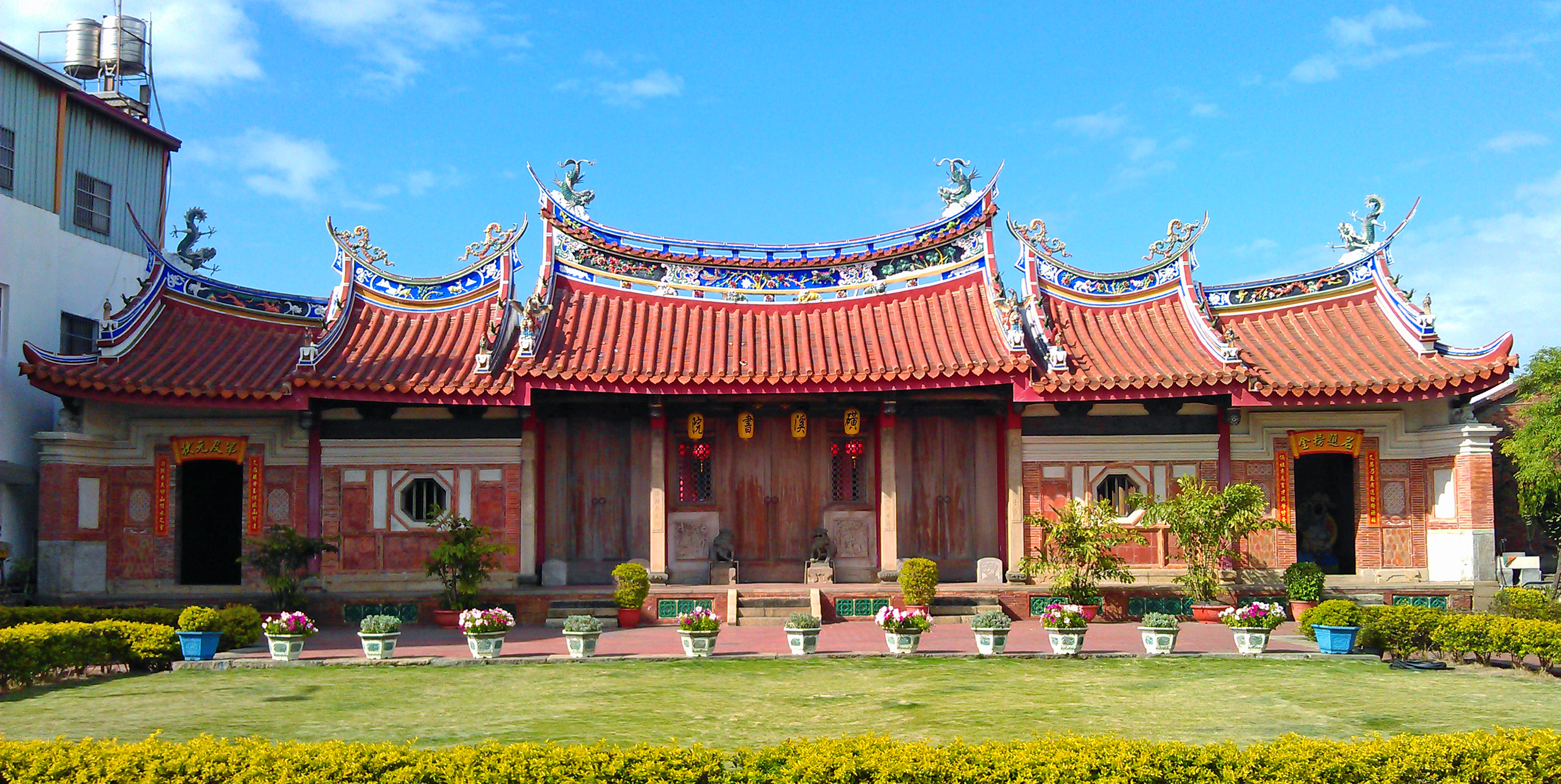

Location
- Dadu, Taichung, Taiwan
- Coordinates: 24°9′0.4″N 120°32′21.6″E

Information
- Type: former academy
- Established: 1888

The Huangxi Academy (traditional Chinese: 磺溪書院; simplified Chinese: 磺溪书院; pinyin: Huángxī Shūyuàn) is a former academy in Dadu District, Taichung, Taiwan.

== History ==
The building was originally built in 1888 as an extended building to the existing Wenchang Temple. The building was closed during the Japanese rule of Taiwan. After the handover of Taiwan from Japan to the Republic of China in 1945, the building was sold and many of its objects were stolen. In 1984, an architect and scholar Han Pao-teh completed the research on the academy and begun the restoration of the building.

== Architecture ==
The building was built with late Qing Dynasty architecture of traditional southern Fujian style. Its roof has five sections and six wallow tails.

== Transportation ==
The building is accessible within walking distance south west of Dadu Station of Taiwan Railway.

== See also ==
- List of tourist attractions in Taiwan
