= Wuri railway station =

Railway station located in Taichung, Taiwan

Coordinates: 24°06′32.1″N 120°37′20.4″E

Wuri 烏日
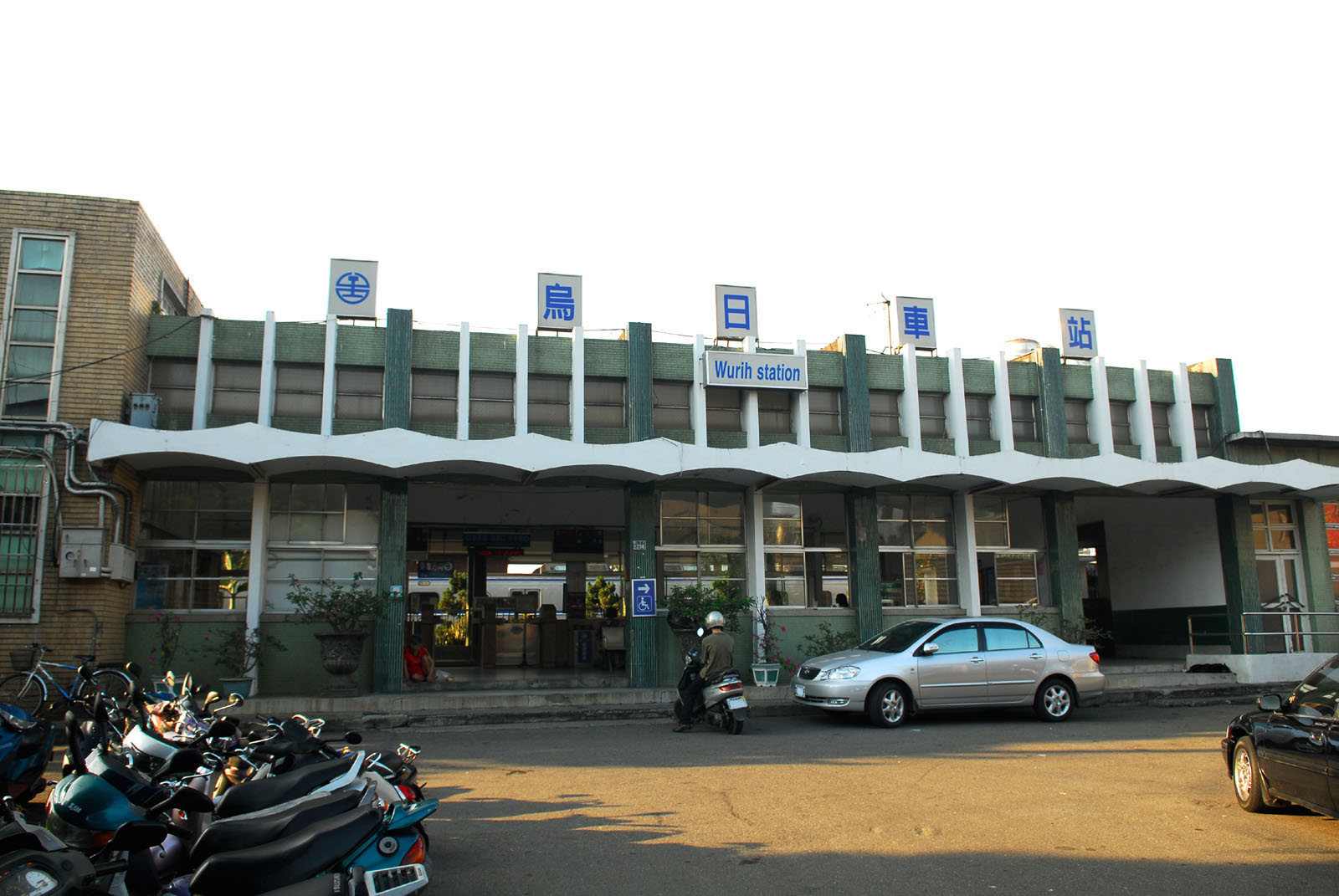

General information
- Location: Wuri, Taichung, Taiwan
- System: TR railway station
- Owner: Taiwan Railway
- Operator: Taiwan Railway
- Line: Taichung
- Train operators: Taiwan Railway

History
- Opened: 15 May 1905

Services
| Preceding station | Taiwan Railway | Following station |
|---|---|---|
| Daqing towards Keelung | Western Trunk line | Xinwuri towards Kaohsiung |
Location

Wuri (Chinese: 烏日; Hanyu Pinyin: Wūrì; Tongyong Pinyin: Wurìh) is a railway station in Wuri District, Taichung, Taiwan. It is served by the Taiwan Railway Taichung line. Although it has the same name as Wuri metro station, the railway and metro stations are not connected, and are located roughly 300 meters apart.

== Station layout ==
| Ground | Platform | Entrance, exit, ticket gate, ticket vending machine, restrooms |
| Ground | 1A Platform | Taichung line To Changhua, Kaohsiung direction (Xinwuri station) |
| Ground | Island platform |
| Ground | 1B Platform | Taichung line To Zhunan, Taipei direction (Daqing station) |

== Rail service ==
As a minor station, Wuri station is primarily serviced by local trains. A few times per day, a Chu-Kuang Express or Tzu-Chiang Limited Express service stops at the station.

== See also ==
- List of railway stations in Taiwan
