= Wuri District =

District of Taichung, Taiwan

Wuri 烏日區 Wurih, Ujitsu
- District
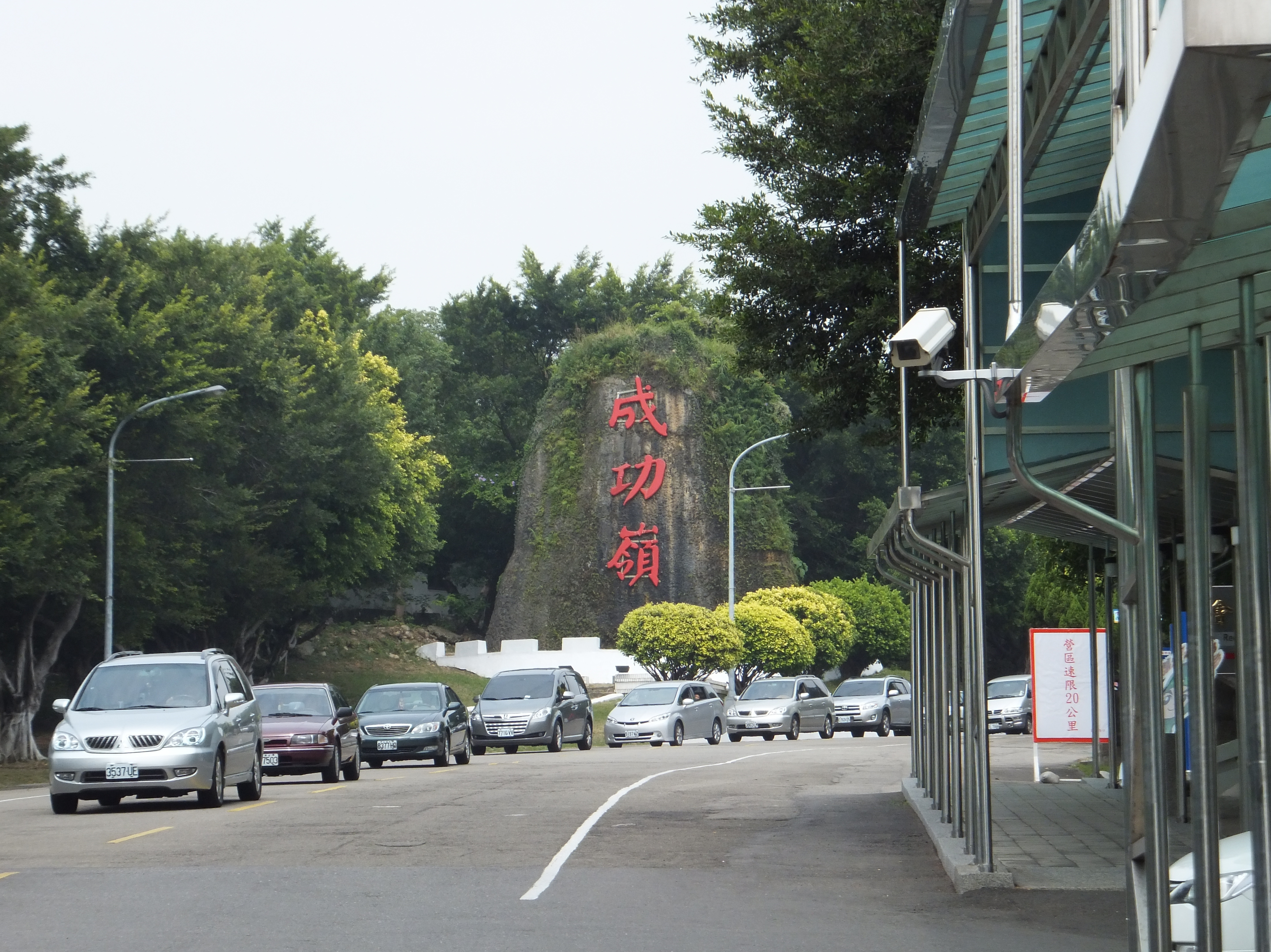
- Chengkungling in Wuri District

- Wuri District in Taichung City

- Location within Taiwan
- Coordinates: 24°5′19.2″N 120°37′56.6″E
- Location: Taichung, Taiwan

Area
  - Total: 43 km^{2} (17 sq mi)

Population (February 2023)
  - Total: 78,510
  - Density: 1,800/km^{2} (4,700/sq mi)
- Website: www.wuri.taichung.gov.tw (in Chinese)

Wuri District (Chinese: 烏日區; pinyin: Wūrì Qū) is a district in southern Taichung, Taiwan. Both of the two north–south freeways (National Freeway 1 and National Freeway 3), as well as Provincial Highway 74 pass through Wuri. Wuri is also home to a large military training centre, Chengkungling, as well as Taichung HSR station, which can connect to Taiwan High Speed Rail, Taiwan Railways, and Green line of Taichung MRT.

== Administrative divisions ==
Wuri, Huri, Sanhe, Rongquan, Xuetian, Jiude, Rende, Qianzhu, Wuguang, Guangming, Tungyuan, Xiju, Luotan, Beili, Nanli and Xiwei Village.

== Geography ==
- Area: 43.4032 km^{2}
- Population: 78,510 people (February 2023)

Wuri District borders Dadu, Nantun, South, Dali, and Wufeng districts of Taichung City, as well as Changhua City and Fenyuan Township of Changhua County.

== Education ==
=== Senior high schools ===
- Mingdao Senior High School

=== Junior high schools ===
- Wurih Junior High School
- Guangde Junior High School
- Shinan Junior High School
- Mingdao Senior High School Junior High Department

=== Elementary schools ===
- Wurih Elementary School
- Jiude Elementary School
- Qiaoren Elementary School
- Wuguang Elementary School
- Xuguang Elementary School
- Dongyuan Elementary School
- Ka Li Elementary School
- Xiwei Elementary School

=== Experimental schools ===
- Mother Earth Waldorf Experimental School

=== Public library ===
- Taichung Public Library Wuri Branch

== Native products ==
- Beer

== Tourist attractions ==
- Chengkungling History Museum
- Greater Taichung International Expo Center

== Transportation ==
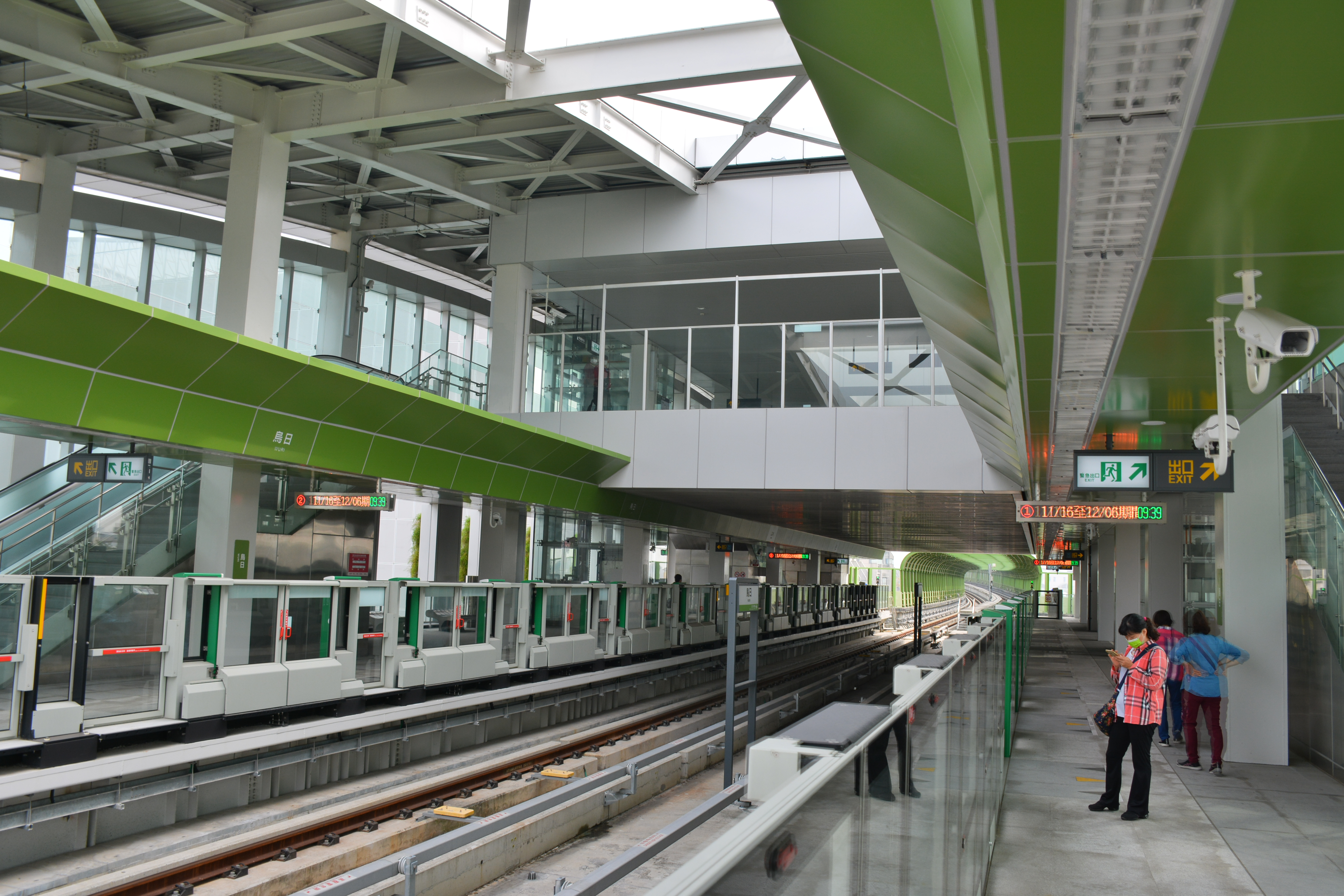
Wuri metro station

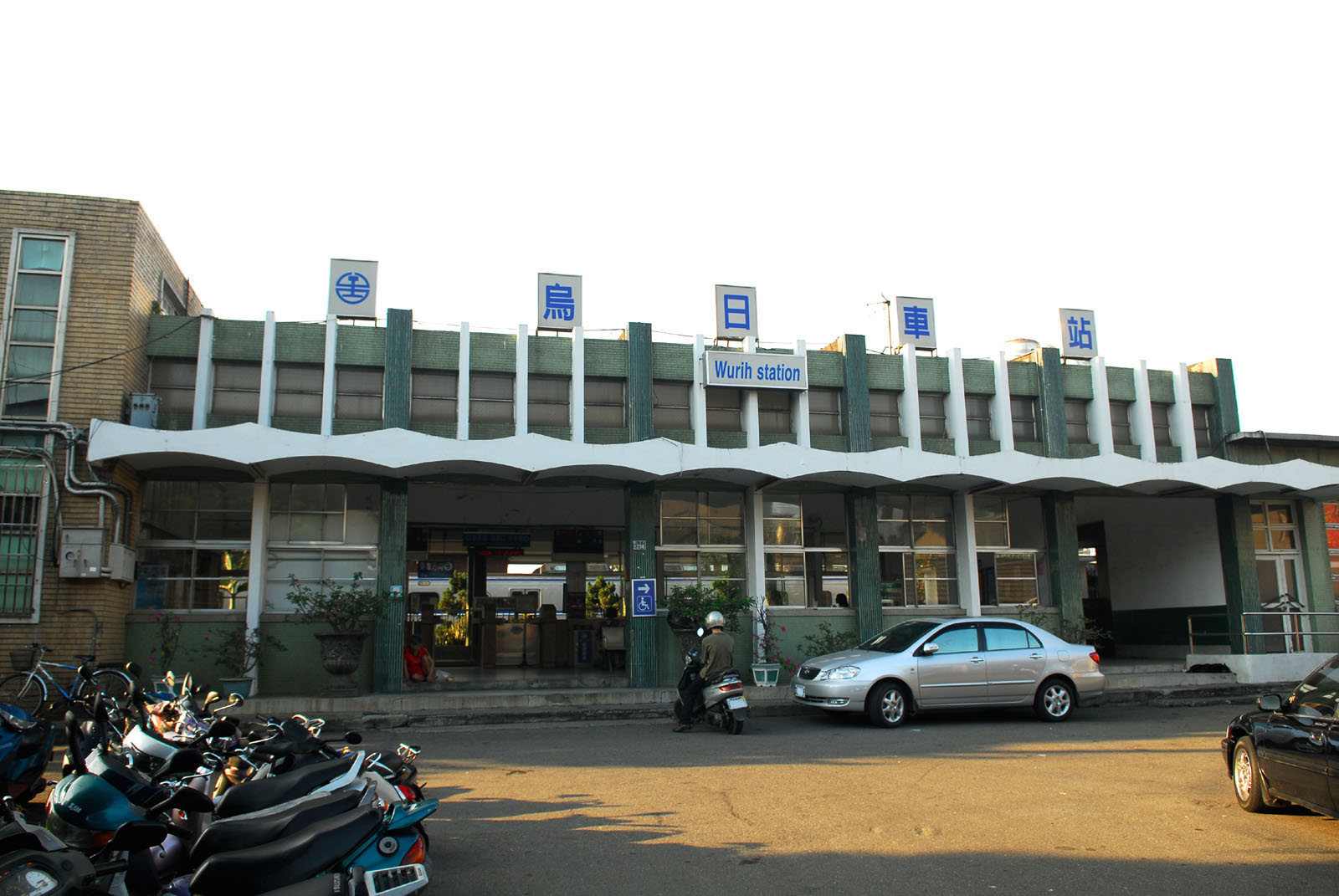
Wuri railway station

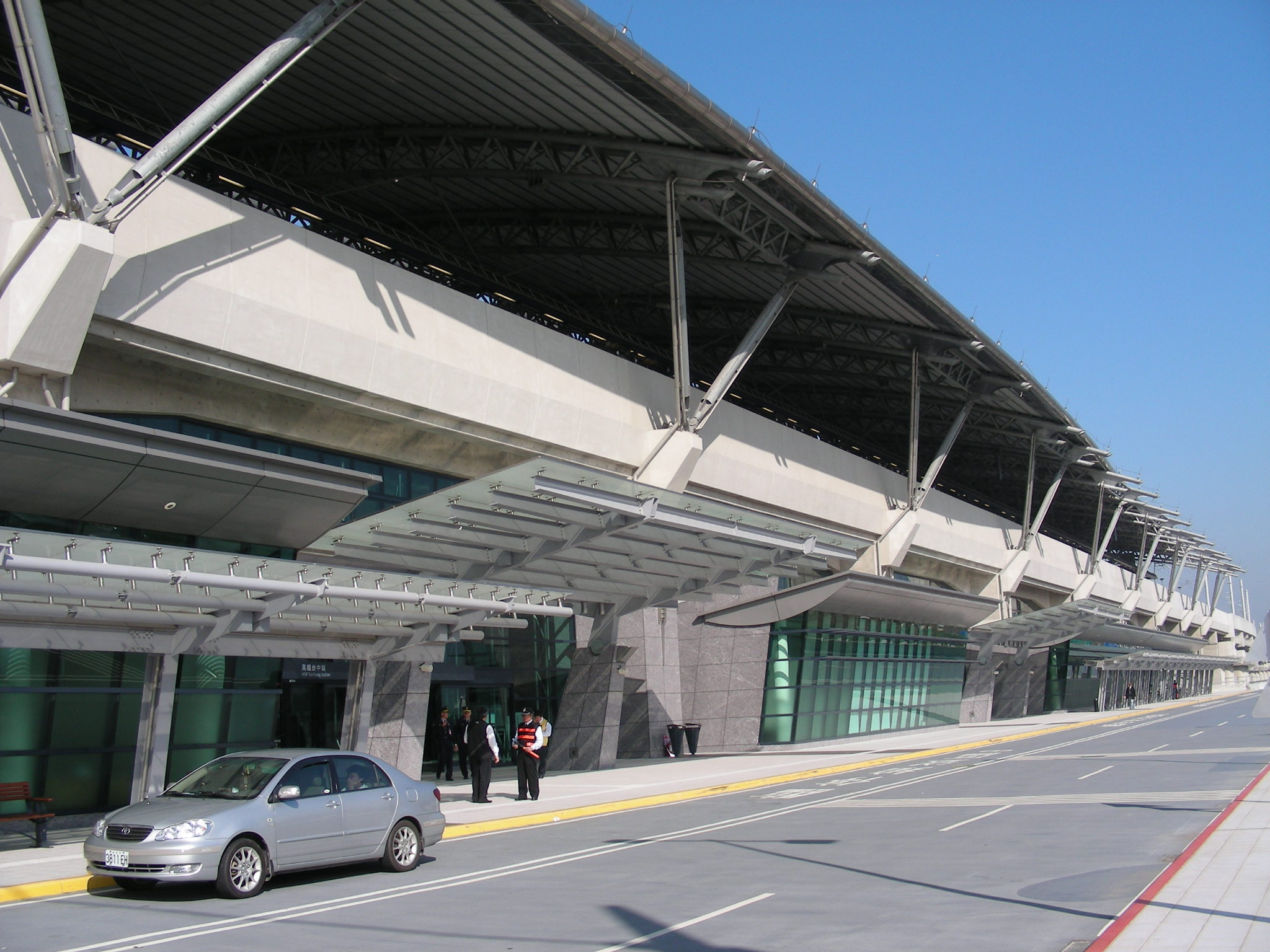
Taichung HSR station

- THSR Taichung Station
- TR Wuri, Xinwuri and Chenggong Stations
- Taichung MRO Jiuzhangli, Jiude, Wuri and HSR Taichung Stations
- Sun Yat-sen Freeway, No.1
- Formosa Freeway, No.3
- Provincial Highway 1
- Provincial Highway 74

== See also ==
- Taichung
