= Rainbow Village =

Taiwanese military-village-turned art park

Coordinates: 24.1333°N 120.6094°E

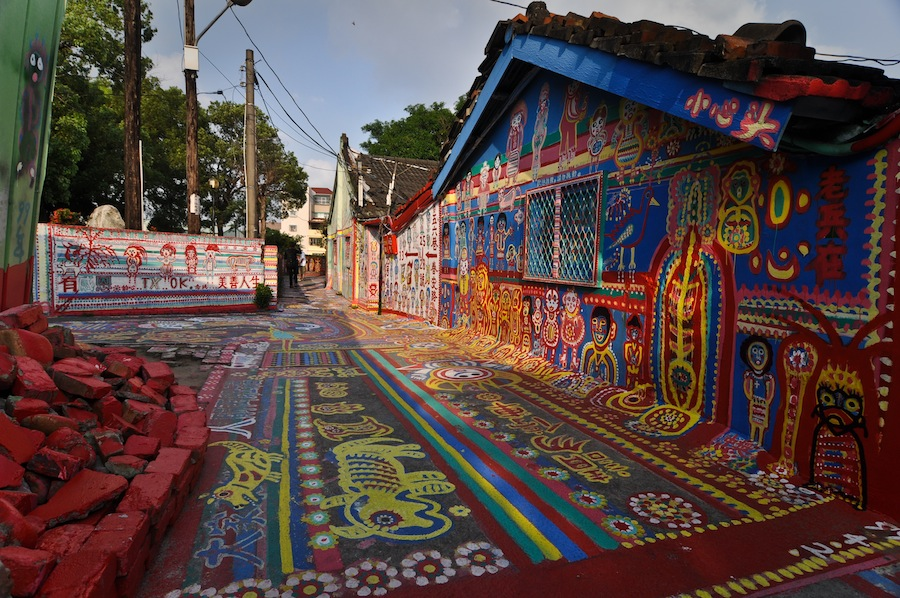
Rainbow Village

Rainbow Village (Chinese: 彩虹眷村; pinyin: Cǎihóng Juàncūn) is a military dependents' village that was converted into street art in Nantun District, Taichung, Taiwan.

== History ==
The artwork of the area was created by former soldier, Huang Yung-Fu, who was born in Taishan county, Guangdong province in 1924, the eldest of four brothers and two sisters. He began painting houses in his settlement, now known as Rainbow village, to save them from demolition. Over the years his colourful artwork, which includes birds, animals and people, has spread over the remaining houses in the village, which once contained 1,200 homes.

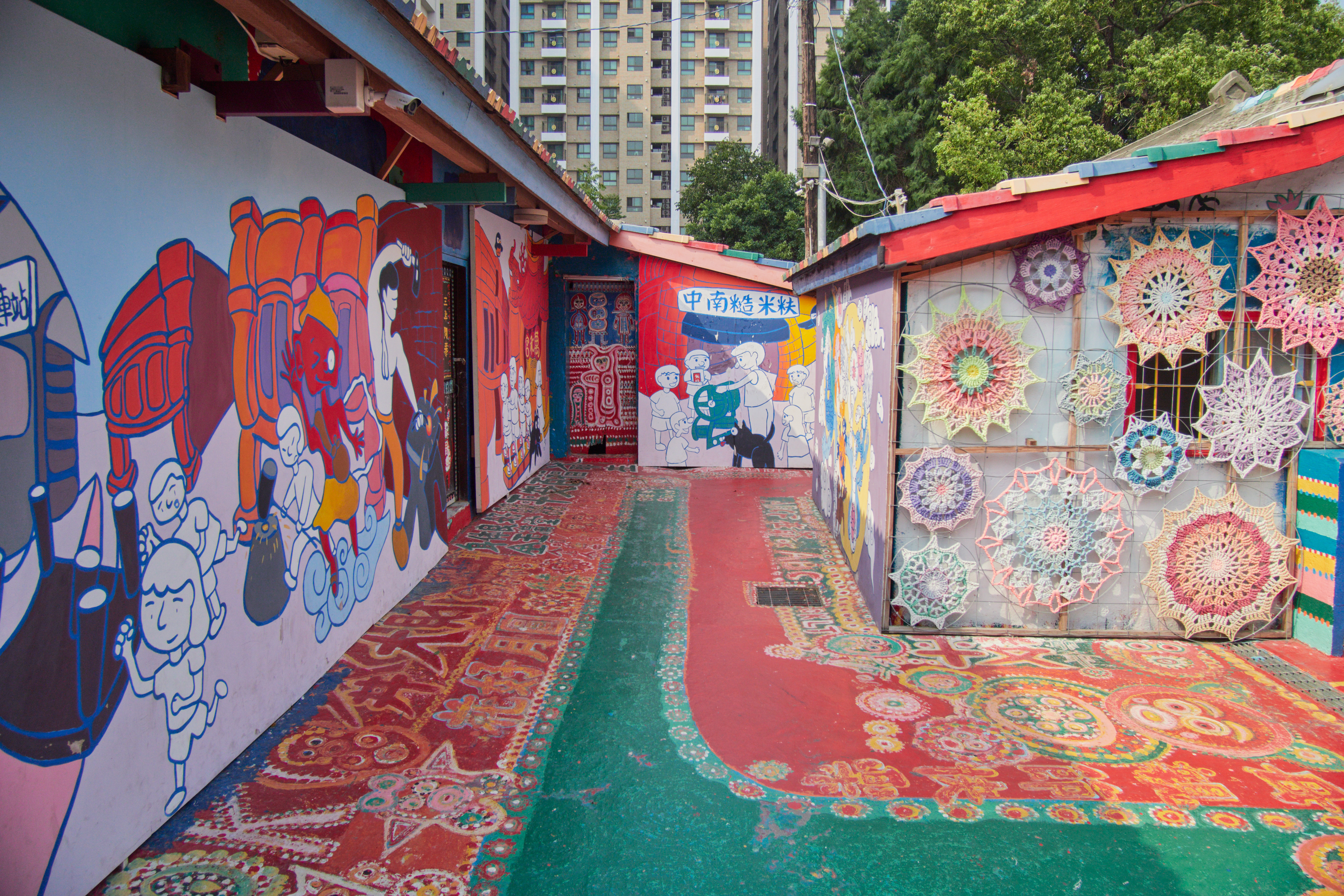

Huang, originally from Hong Kong, joined the National Revolutionary Army (NRA) in 1946 to fight People's Liberation Army in mainland China during the Chinese Civil War. In 1949, many of the defeated NRA troops followed their leader, Chiang Kai-shek, as he fled to Taiwan. Soldiers were given temporary housing in hundreds of dedicated military villages across the island. Eventually, some settlements became permanent and many veterans and their families were left to spend much of their lives in them.

Many houses became run down and developers began buying up the land for redevelopment. Residents were offered compensation or new housing to move but Huang remained even after his neighbours had left and only 11 homes remained. Bored with being the only person left in the village he began painting a bird inside his home and his artwork grew from there.

Local university students discovered Huang's work and campaigned to save the village. Authorities eventually agreed that it should be preserved and hopefully become a designated cultural area. It is a popular tourist attraction, along with nearby Art street pulling in more than a million visitors annually, mostly from Asia.

Huang died on 23 January 2024 at the age of 100.

Now the Rainbow Village isn't what it used to be because of contract dispute. Some workers and their boss, angry about their sudden loss of jobs, protested by painting over many of Huang’s murals. Huang was too old to repaint them. After renovation, it reopened again in June 2023, but with some changes in places where art was repainted.

== Transportation ==
The village is accessible north of Xinwuri Station of Taiwan Railway.
