= Jiuzhangli metro station =

Metro station in Taichung, Taiwan

Jiuzhangli 116 九張犁
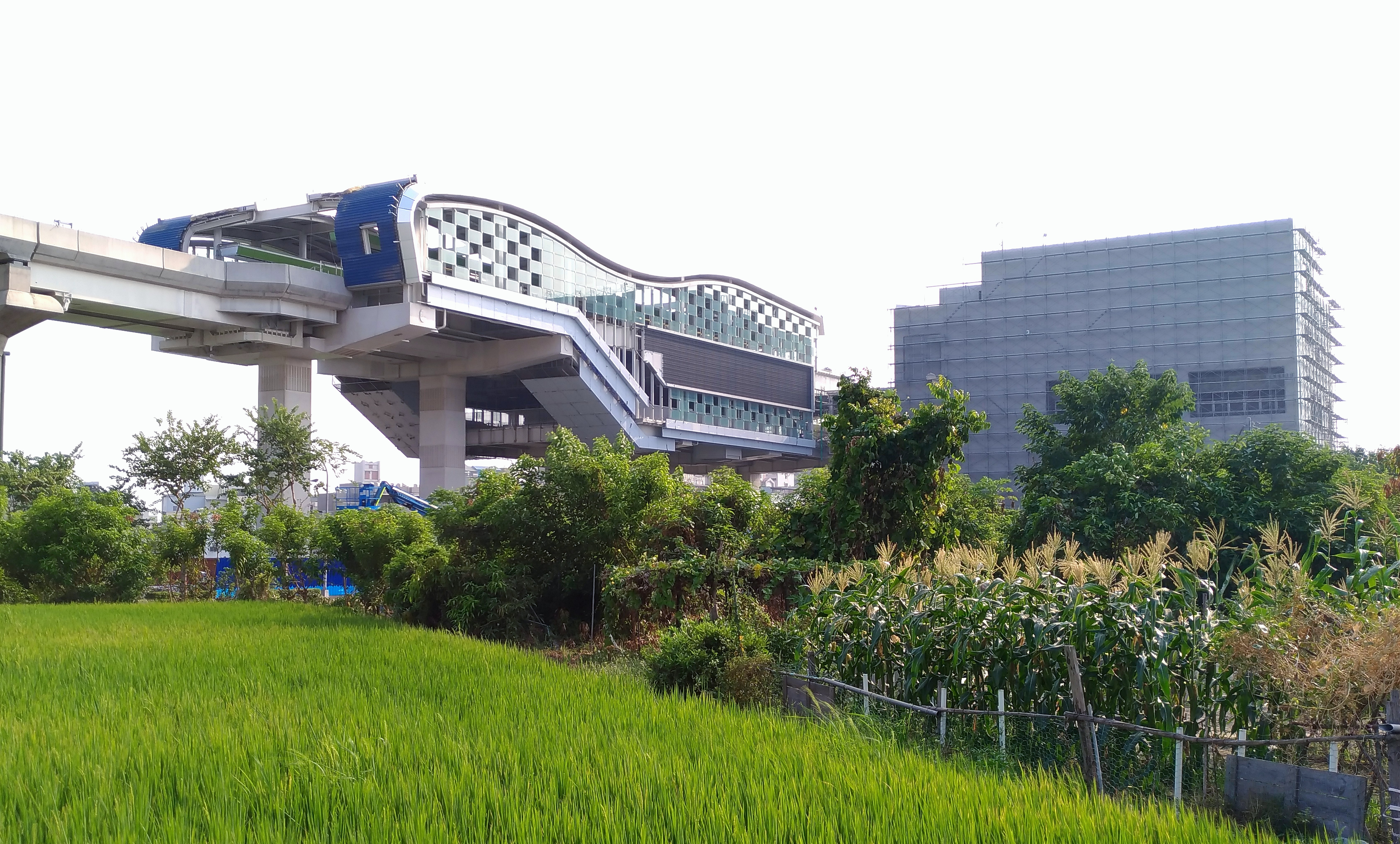

General information
- Location: Wuri, Taichung; Taiwan
- Coordinates: 24.1145°N 120.6402°E
- Operated by: Taichung MRT
- Line: Green line
- Platforms: 2 side platforms

Construction
- Structure type: Elevated

Other information
- Station code: 116

History
- Opened: 25 April 2021

Services
Preceding station	Taichung MRT	Following station
Jiude towards HSR Taichung Station	Green line	Daqing towards Beitun Main
Location

Jiuzhangli metro station
- Chinese: 九張犁站
Transcriptions
Standard Mandarin
- Hanyu Pinyin: Jiǔzhānglí Zhàn
- Bopomofo: ㄐㄧㄡˇ ㄓㄤ ㄌㄧˊ ㄓㄢˋ
- Tongyong Pinyin: Jiǒujhānglí Jhàn

Jiuzhangli is a metro station on the Green line operated by Taichung MRT in Wuri District, Taichung, Taiwan.

The station name is taken from an old name of the area. It is currently the least used station on the Taichung MRT.

== Station layout ==
4F	Side platform, doors will open on the right
4F	Track 1	Green line: towards HSR Taichung Station (Jiude)
4F	Track 2	Green line: towards Beitun Main (Daqing)
4F	Side platform, doors will open on the right
3F	Concourse	Lobby, information desk, automatic ticket dispensing machines, one-way faregates
2F	Mezzanine	Transitlink floor for stairs and escalators
1F	Street level	Exit/entrance

== Exits ==
Jiuzhangli station currently has one exit on the northern side of the station. The southern exit, which is closer to nearby communities, has not yet obtained private land, and was expected to open in 2023.
