= Mingdao High School =

Coordinates: 24.1058°N 120.6364°E

Location
- No.497, Jhongshan Road, Sec 1 Wuri District, Taichung, Taiwan; Republic of China

Information
- Type: Secondary School
- Established: 1969
- Grades: 7-12
- Enrollment: 7,510 (2020)
- Campus: Suburban
- Website: Mingdao High Website

Mingdao High School is a private secondary school located at 497, Sec 1, Zhongshan Road, Wuri District, Taichung, Taiwan 41401. The school serves grades 7-12. There are 7,510 students. The school is served by the Ming Dao high school bus station.

Mingdao teaches 7 major subjects: Chinese, English, math, science, social science, information, and liberal arts.

== Mingdao International Department ==
Mingdao International Department, MDID for short, is one of the 4 departments of Mingdao. It's one of the few IB schools in Taichung.

== History ==
Mingdao was founded in 1969 by Wang Fu-Lai and Wang Kuang-Ping. Mingdao is now composed of a junior high school, senior high school, comprehensive high school and adult school at night, with a total of 7,510 students.

== Library ==
There are more than 150,000 volumes in Mingdao library, including its Complete Library of the Four Treasuries (Siku Quanshu). The library building also includes both of its Classical Chinese Literature Classrooms, molded after ancient Chinese classrooms, and its Contemporary Literature Museum, which offers the complete works of many modern writers.

== Honors ==
- International Schools CyberFair - 1 Gold (2005), 1 Silver (2006), 2 Honorable Mention (2004, 2007)
- Doors to Diplomacy - 1 Platinum (2007), 1 Silver (2006)
- ARML American Regions Math League - 2006 2nd place B division

== Related links ==
- Official web site
- Home page of Ministry Of Education
- Mingdao Future Heir Elementary School Official web site
