= Wuri metro station =

Metro station in Taichung, Taiwan

Coordinates: 24°06′32.1″N 120°37′20.4″E

Wuri 118 烏日
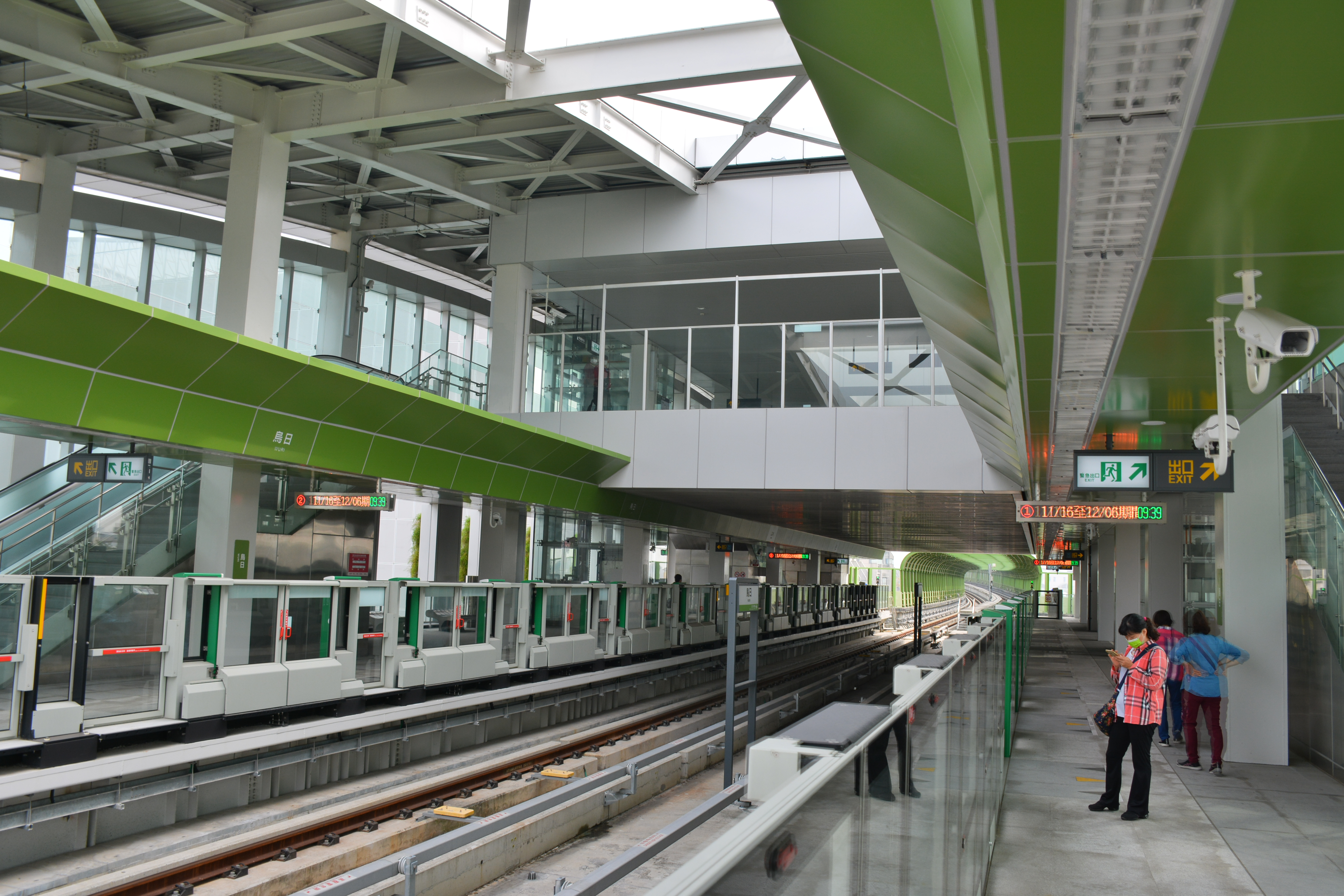

General information
- Operated by: Taichung MRT
- Line: Green line
- Platforms: 2 side platforms

Construction
- Structure type: Elevated

Other information
- Station code: 118

History
- Opened: 25 April 2021

Services
Preceding station	Taichung MRT	Following station
HSR Taichung Station Terminus	Green line	Jiude towards Beitun Main
Location

Wuri (Chinese: 烏日; Hanyu Pinyin: Wūrì; Tongyong Pinyin: Wurìh) is a metro station on the Green line of Taichung MRT. Although the station has the same name as Wuri railway station, the stations are not connected and are approximately 300 meters apart.
