= Jiude metro station =

Metro station in Taichung, Taiwan

Jiude 117 九德
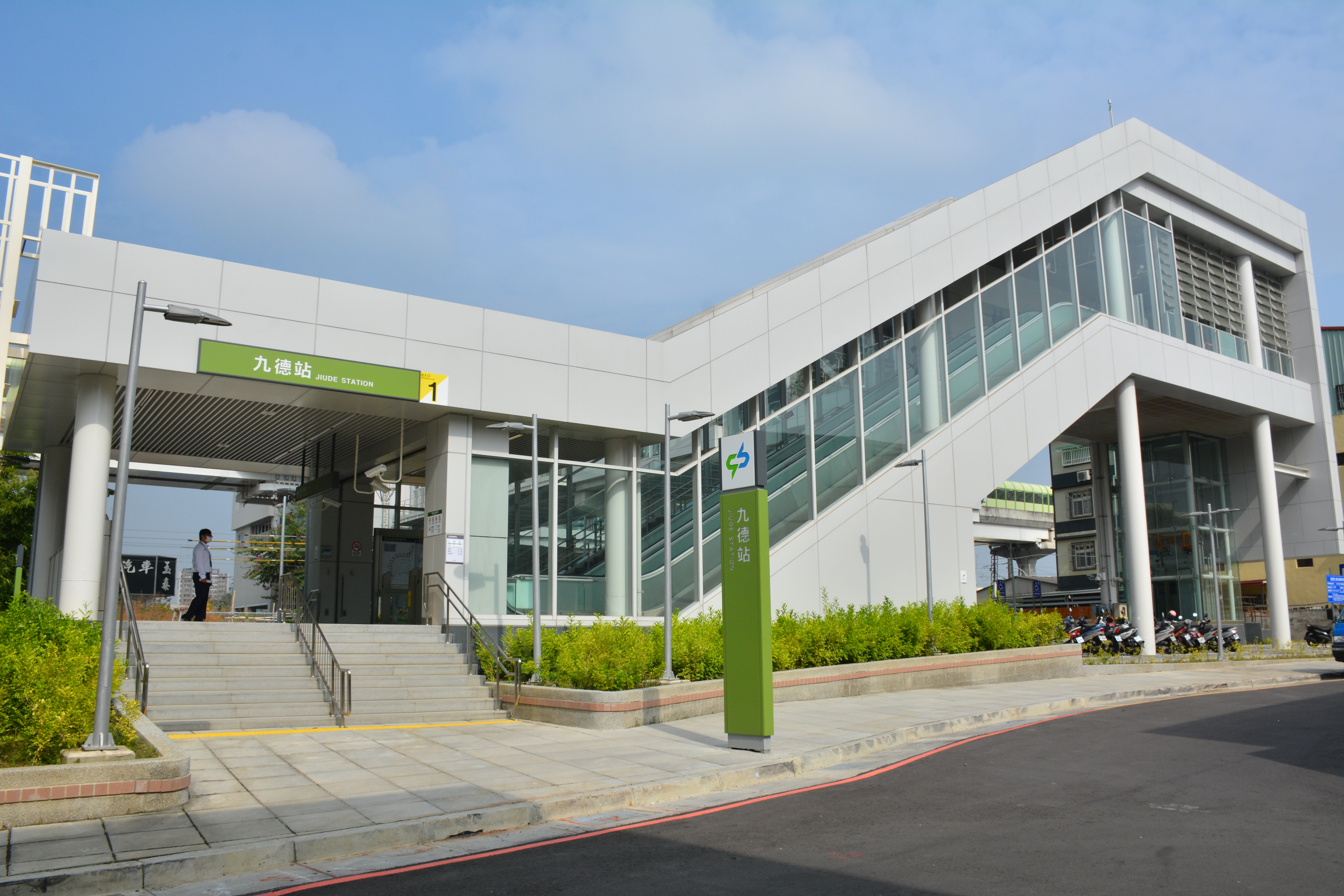

General information
- Location: Wuri, Taichung; Taiwan
- Coordinates: 24.1110°N 120.6345°E
- Operated by: Taichung MRT
- Line: Green line
- Platforms: 2 side platforms

Construction
- Structure type: Elevated

Other information
- Station code: 117

History
- Opened: 25 April 2021

Services
Preceding station	Taichung MRT	Following station
Wuri towards HSR Taichung Station	Green line	Jiuzhangli towards Beitun Main
Location

Jiude metro station
- Chinese: 九德站
Transcriptions
Standard Mandarin
- Hanyu Pinyin: Jiǔdé Zhàn
- Bopomofo: ㄐㄧㄡˇ ㄉㄜˊ ㄓㄢˋ
- Tongyong Pinyin: Jiǒudé Jhàn

Jiude is a metro station on the Green line operated by Taichung MRT in Wuri District, Taichung, Taiwan.

The station name is taken from an old name of the area.

== Station layout ==
3F	Side platform, doors will open on the right
3F	Track 1	Green line: towards HSR Taichung Station (Wuri)
3F	Track 2	Green line: towards Beitun Main (Jiuzhangli)
3F	Side platform, doors will open on the right
2F	Concourse	Lobby, information desk, automatic ticket dispensing machines, one-way faregates
1F	Street level	Exit/entrance
