= Dadu District, Taichung =

District in Taichung, Taiwan

Coordinates: 24.15366°N 120.54096°E

Dadu 大肚區 Tōa-tō͘, Daito
- District
- Dadu District
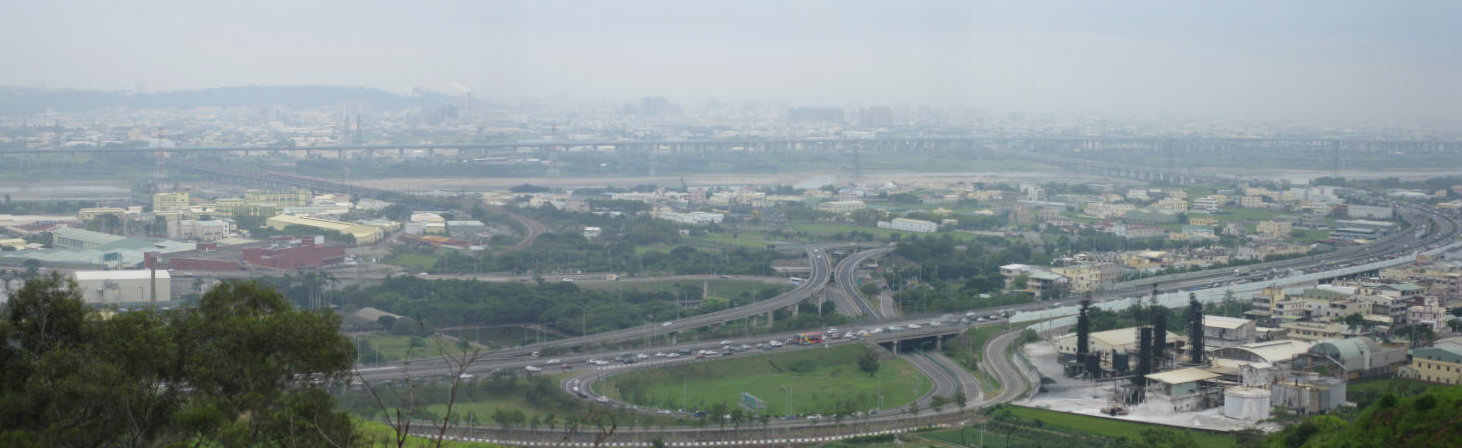
- Wangtien Interchange in late-May 2009

- Dadu District in Taichung City
- Country: Taiwan
- Special Municipality: Taichung

Area
  - Total: 37.0024 km^{2} (14.2867 sq mi)

Population (March 2023)
  - Total: 56,097
  - Density: 1,510.3/km^{2} (3,912/sq mi)
- Time zone: UTC+8 (CST)
- Website: www.dadu.taichung.gov.tw (in Chinese)

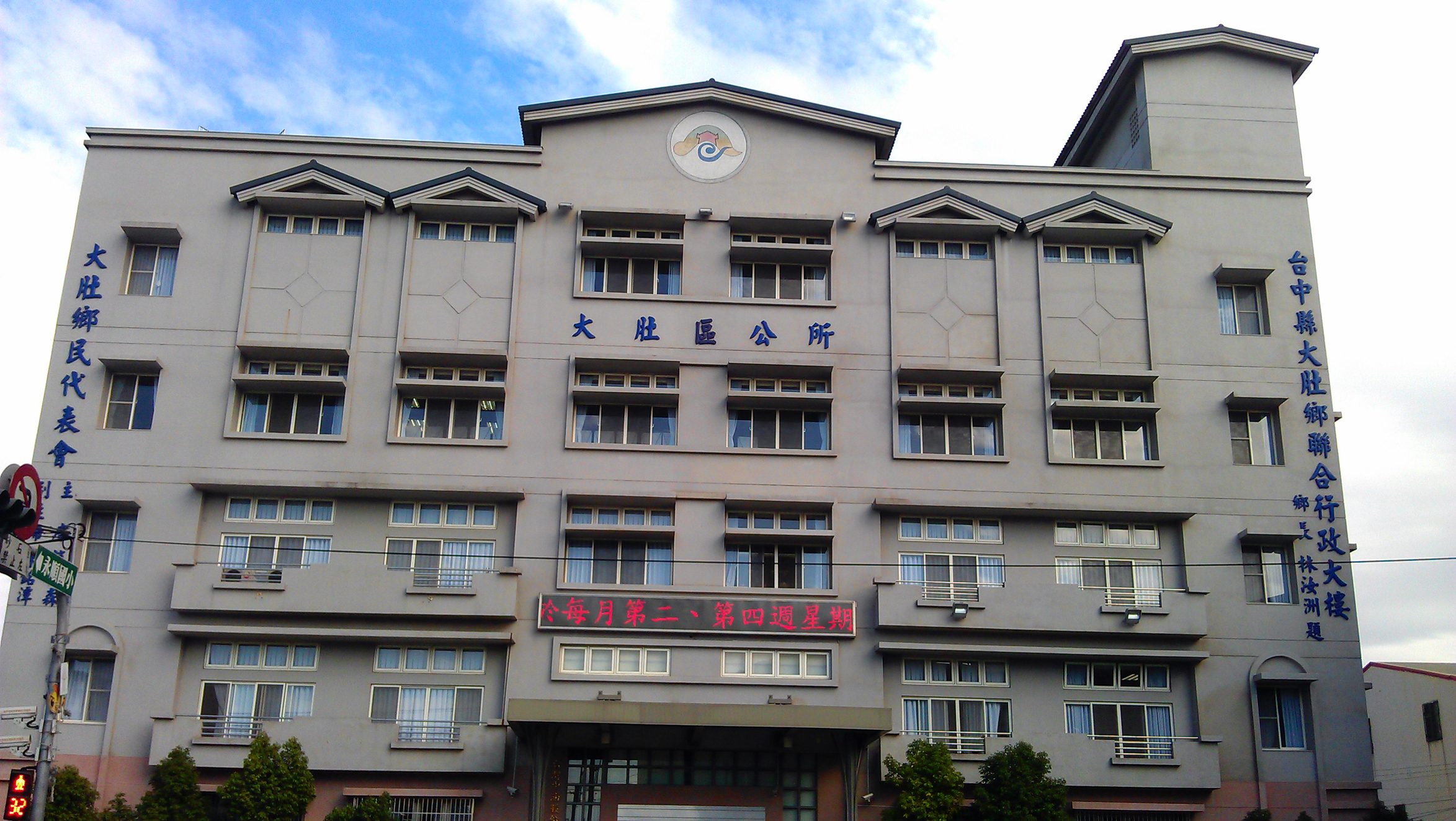
Dadu District Office

Dadu District (Chinese: 大肚區; pinyin: Dàdù Qū; Pe̍h-ōe-jī: Tōa-tō͘-khu) is a suburban district in southwestern Taichung, Taiwan. The eponymous Dadu River flows nearby.

== History ==
The Yingpu culture was a late Neolithic culture in mid-Taiwan.

Dadu was the historical capital of the Kingdom of Middag which was established by the Taiwanese indigenous tribes of Papora, Babuza, Pazeh, and Hoanya.

Huangxi Academy was built in 1887 and was the predecessor of Dadu Elementary School.

== Administrative divisions ==
Dadu District consists of 17 villages.

- Chenggong Village
- Dadu Village
- Dadong Village
- Dingjie Village
- Fushan Village
- Huangsi Village
- Jhebu Village
- Jhonghe Village
- Rueijing Village
- Shanyang Village
- Shejiao Village
- Sinsing Village
- Wangtian Village
- Yingpu Village
- Yonghe Village
- Yongshun Village
- Zihciang Village

== Tourist attractions ==
- Huangxi Academy

== Transportation ==
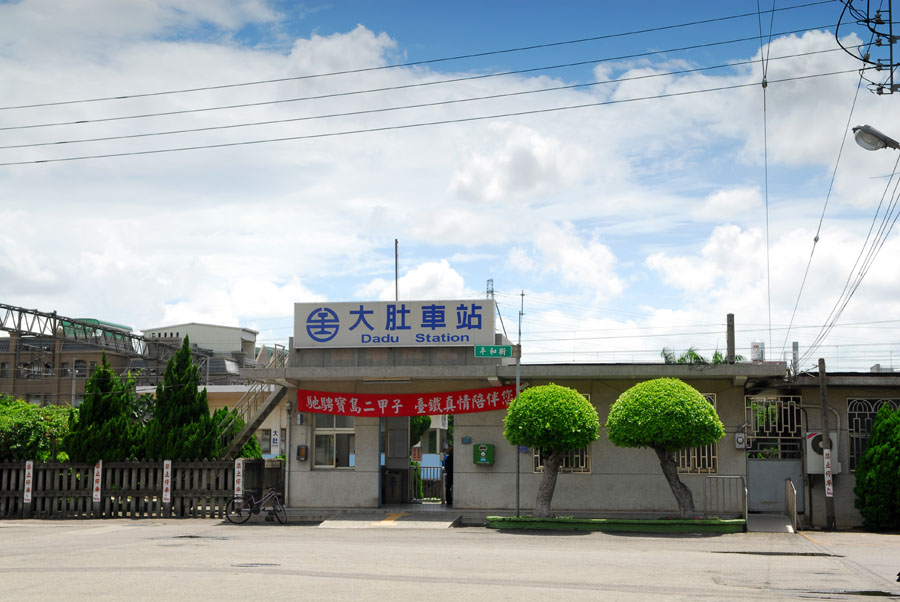
Dadu station

- TR Dadu station
- TR Zhuifen station

== See also ==
- Taichung
