= Lý Thái Tông =

Vietnamese emperor (1000–1054)

Lý Thái Tông 李太宗
- Emperor of Đại Việt
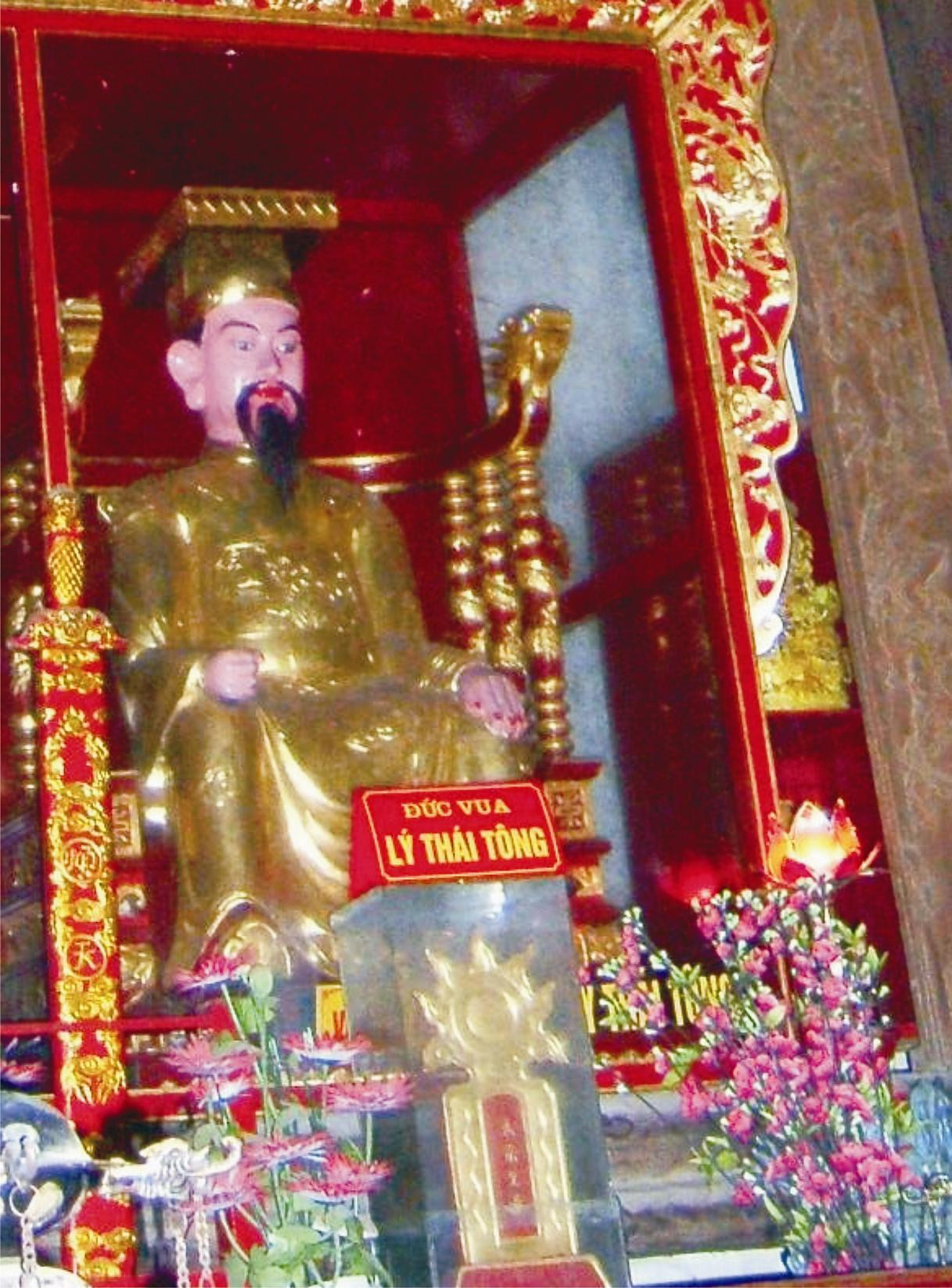
- A statue of emperor Lý Thái Tông

Emperor of Đại Cồ Việt
- Reign: 1 April 1028 – 3 November 1054 (26 years, 216 days)
- Predecessor: Lý Thái Tổ
- Successor: Lý Thánh Tông

Emperor of the Lý dynasty
- Reign: 1/4/1028–3/11/1054
- Predecessor: Lý Thái Tổ
- Successor: Lý Thánh Tông
- Born: 29 July 1000; Duyên Ninh pagoda, Ninh Bình province
- Died: 3 November 1054 (aged 54); Thăng Long, Đại Cồ Việt
- Burial: Thọ Tomb
- Spouse: Empress Linh Cảm (Mai thị) (靈感皇后枚氏). Vương hoàng hậu (王皇后). Đinh hoàng hậu (丁皇后). Thiên Cảm hoàng hậu (天感皇后).
- Issue: Crown prince Lý Nhật Tôn as emperor Lý Thánh Tông; Prince of Phụng Càn Lý Nhật Trung; Princess Bình Dương; Princess Trường Ninh; Princess Kim Thành
Names
- Lý Phật Mã (李佛瑪); Lý Đức Chính (李德政)
Era dates
- Thiên Thành (天成: 1028–1033); Thông Thụy (通瑞: 1034–1038); Càn Phù Hữu Đạo (乾符有道: 1039–1041); Minh Đạo (明道: 1042–1043); Thiên Cảm Thánh Vũ (天感聖武: 1044–1048); Sùng Hưng Đại Bảo (崇興大寶: 1049–1054)
Regnal name
- Khai Thiên Thống Vận Tôn Đạo Quý Đức Thánh Văn Quảng Vũ Sùng Nhân Thượng Thiện Chính Lý Dân An Thần Phù Long Hiện Thể Nguyên Ngự Cực Ức Tuế Công Cao Ứng Chân Bảo Lịch Thông Huyền Chí Áo Hưng Long Đại Địch Thông Minh Từ Hiếu Hoàng đế" (開天統運尊道貴德聖文廣武崇仁尚善政理民安神符龍見體元禦極億歲功高應真寶歷通玄至奧興龍大定聰明慈孝皇帝)
Temple name
- Thái Tông (太宗)
- House: Lý
- Father: Lý Thái Tổ
- Mother: Empress Linh Hiển
- Religion: Buddhism

- Temple name
- Vietnamese alphabet: Lý Thái Tông
- Chữ Hán: 李太宗

- Personal name
- Vietnamese alphabet: Lý Phật Mã
- Chữ Hán: 李佛瑪

Lý Thái Tông (chữ Hán: 李太宗; 29 July 1000 – 3 November 1054), personal name Lý Phật Mã, posthumously temple name Thái Tông, was the second emperor of the Lý dynasty, ruled Đại Việt from 1028 to 1054. He was considered the most successful Vietnamese emperor since the tenth century.

== Early life ==
Lý Phật Mã was born in 1000 in Hoa Lư, Ninh Bình, during the reign of emperor Lê Hoàn, when his father Lý Công Uẩn was an official of the royal court. His mother was Lê Thị Phất Ngân, daughter of Lê Hoàn. When he was nine, Lý Công Uẩn became the new ruler of Đại Việt and moved the capital from Hoa Lư to Thăng Long. In 1020, as crown prince, Phật Mã was marching his army south through Thanh Hóa, he encountered the spirit of Mount Trống Đồng, which promised to help his campaign. Phật Mã successfully invaded Champa, killed the Cham commander, and destroyed half his army. After his father's death, Phật Mã claimed that the Spirit of Mount Trống Đồng, or the Mountain of the Bronze Drum (Thần Núi Đồng Cổ), which also inhabited a shrine at Thăng Long.

== Reign ==
Lý Phật Mã ascended the throne in 1028. At the beginning of his reign, Thái Tông relied mostly on his father's officers to put down an uprising by two of his brothers contesting his accession, and personally led an expedition against a third rebellious brother at Hoa Lư.

When his rule became more secure, Thái Tông started to demonstrate his unconventional style of governing. The empror ignored convention and promoted a favourite concubine to royal status, thereby provoking a rebellion, which he crushed. He reorganized administration on the borders and built ocean-going junks. He apparently attempted to reform the system of justice and prisons at Thăng Long by placing it under the protection of the cult of a tenth-century hero. He ignored the objections of his advisers and insisted on personally conducting the spring ploughing ceremony. In 1039, Thái Tông had a serious discussion with his official about whether a good government depended upon strong personal leadership or a sophisticated institution. In the end, he accepted his officials' opinion and started to reform the government.

In the same year he captured the Nùng leader Nùng Tồn Phúc and publicly executed them at Thăng Long, publishing an edict full of self-righteous pride and indignation.

In 1041 Thái Tông had statues cast of the Buddha Maitreya and two irrigation gods; the latter may again imply the emergence of Confucian associations between the monarchy and agricultural organization.

In 1042 Thái Tông created a new code, called the Minh Đạo laws. Inspired by the Tang Code in China, these new laws were written by officials charged by Phat Ma to'deliberate about what was suitable to the contemporary age. The Minh Đạolaw book has not survived, but nine edicts dated within a few months of its publication have survived.

Also in the same year, Tồn Phúc's son Nùng Trí Cao, the leader of the Nung clan in Cao Bằng province, proclaimed the state of Dali (大历). The Vietnamese captured him and held at Thăng Long for several years. In the next year, the Vietnamese court first time used the term nho thần (Confucianist scholar), referring to court officials whom the emperor ordered to "compose a rhyming narrative" in order to publicize his achievement of an "extraordinary supernatural event".

In 1044, Thái Tông with his army invaded Champa by seaborne. After sailed 950 km across the sea, the Vietnamese fleet attacked Champa and the Cham emperor, Jaya Simhavarman II, was killed. The amount of the plunder was considerable, included 5,000 captives, trained elephants, gold, jade, and other treasures. The Cham captives settled in Nghệ An, lived in Cham-style villages and either became personal servants to the royal elite or laboured for religious establishments. They also contributed to the construction of religious buildings, indicated by thousands of bricks from Ba Đình which bear Cham script. Taxes were reduced, foreign merchants were accommodated, markets were opened in the mountains.

In 1048, Nùng Trí Cao again rebelled and proclaimed the state of Heavenly South. Thái Tông attacked Nùng Trí Cao and only succeed in pushing him into the Song China's territories.

In 1049, having dreamed of Avalokiteśvara seated on a lotus, he ordered the construction in Thăng Long of the One Pillar Pagoda, which survived in twentieth-century Hanoi. Starting around 1049, Thái Tông became less occupied with worldly affairs. He began to seek solutions of life through religion.

He died in 1054 and a few months before his death, he transferred the governing job to his son Lý Nhật Tôn (Lý Thánh Tông). The succession went much smoother than the one in 1028 and proved the success of Thái Tông's institutional reform.

== Religious activities ==
Lý Phật Mã was a devout Mahayana Buddhist since youth age. In 1040 he ordered silversmiths to decorate more than 1,000 statues and more than 1,000 paintings of Buddha. Thái Tông engaged with the Buddhist community more directly than did his father. Interacting with a variety of monks, he sought to honoured their varied opinions, including those emanating from India and China. At one point, the emperor held a vegetarian feast and state:

I have noticed that scholars have disputed with mind-source of the Buddhas and the patriarchs. I wish that each your here, men of eminent virtue from various districts, would express his point of view to me so that I could see how to apply mind.

Huệ Sinh, a monk of distinguished local family whom the emperor had brought from a mountain north into the capital, made this reply in verse:

Dharma is originally like non-Dharma
Neither existent nor non-existent
If one knows the truth,
The sentient beings and Buddha are one.
How great the Moon over Lanka!
Empty, empty, the boat that crosses the ocean
If one knows emptiness, by mean of that emptiness one realizes being,
Free to go everywhere in samadhi.

Thái Tông followed the monk's view, and Huệ Sinh became the court teacher. In the process, this monk composed inscriptions for a number of major temples in Tiên Du and Vũ Ninh areas north of the capital (which none of these temples survived). Thái Tông also brought the spirit cults into the capital. He was particularly close to the cult of the spirit of the Mountain of Bronze Drum in Thanh Hóa. In front of this spirit, the emperor had courtiers swear their yearly blood oath of allegiance.

== Family ==
- Parents
  - Lý Công Uẩn (974 – 1028), founder of the house
  - Empress Lập Giáo (981 – ?)
- Consorts
  - Queen Kim Thiên (金天皇后)
  - Queen Vương (王皇后)
  - Queen Đinh (丁皇后)
  - Queen Dương (天感皇后)
- Children
  - Lý Nhật Tôn (李日尊, 1023 – 1072), first son
  - Lý Nhật Trung, Prince of Phụng Càn (李日中, 奉乾王), second son
  - Princess Bình Dương (平陽公主)
  - Princess Trường Ninh (长宁公主)
  - Princess Kim Thành (慶城公主)

Regnal titles
| Preceded by Lý Thái Tổ | Emperor of the Lý dynasty 1028–1054 | Succeeded by Lý Thánh Tông |
