= Vinītaruci =

Indian Buddhist monk (died 594)

Vinītaruci (विनीतरुचि; died 594) was an Indian Buddhist monk who preached in China and Vietnam.

He came to Changan in 573 and spent seven years in China. In 580 he came to support the preaching of Buddhism in Vietnam, being notable as one of the first direct influences on Vietnam in the History of Buddhism in India and in the development of Vietnamese Thiền or Chinese Chán Zen Buddhism in Vietnam. He is known in Vietnam as Tì-ni-đa-lưu-chi (from the Sino-Vietnamese transcription of the Sanskrit 毘尼多流支) and also by the Chinese Sino-Vietnamese name Diệt Hỉ (滅喜) in Chinese-language texts of Vietnamese Buddhism. He was from Oḍḍiyāna, traditionally identified as a place in the Swat valley.

== Preaching in Vietnam ==
Vinītaruci came to Vietnam around the end of the 6th century (around 580), residing at Phap Van Pagoda (now Dau Pagoda, Bac Ninh). He translated Mahāprajñāpāramitā-saṃcārya-sūtra after having translated Gayāśīrṣasūtra in China.

In his final moments, the Master called for his devoted disciple, Dharmabhadra, and bestowed upon him his spiritual testament:

"The seal of all Buddhas is without deceit, as vast as the boundless sky, neither lacking nor excessive, neither coming nor going, neither gaining nor losing, neither one nor different, neither permanent nor impermanent, originally without a place of birth nor a place of extinction, neither distant nor not distant. It is only due to illusory circumstances that such a name is established... When Master Sengcan impressed this mind upon me, he told me to quickly go to the South to teach others. Having traveled to many places, I have now arrived here and met you, which is truly in accordance with the ancient prophecy. So you should cherish this well, for the time of my departure has come."

Having said that, Vinītaruci folded his hands and passed away. Pháp Hiền carried out the cremation rites, gathered the sacred relics, and erected a stupa in their honor in the year 594.
