= Vietnamese National Heroes =

Vietnamese symbolic title

Vietnamese National Heroes (Vietnamese: Anh hùng dân tộc Việt Nam) is a term defined by the Ministry of Culture, Sports and Tourism to designate fourteen prominent figures in the history of Vietnam. These figures would have statues of them built in their home regions, regions where they had significant marks, regions where there are traditional events in their names, and regions that need tourist attractions.

== Criteria and List ==
According to Official Dispatch 2296 (Công văn 2296/BVHTTDL-MTNATL), in order to be considered a National Heroes, a figure must fall under one of the following criteria:

1. Leader and initiator of a revolt against foreign domination whose goal was to achieve independence.
2. Leader of a dynasty with major contributions to national prosperity, or manage to gain considerable achievements in regard to the constructing and maintaining the nation.
3. Figures with outstanding military, political, and cultural careers.

In 2013, the Ministry of Culture, Sports and Tourism published the list of Vietnamese National Heroes. They are:

1. Hùng kings – Second criteria. Founder of the Hồng Bàng dynasty (Văn Lang), was regarded as the ancestor of the Vietnamese nation.
2. Trưng sisters – First criteria. The two heroines who led the rebellion against the Han dynasty, which ended the First Era of Chinese Domination.
3. Lý Nam Đế – First criteria. Leader of the revolt against the Liang dynasty, which ended the Second Era of Chinese Domination, and founder of the Early Lý dynasty (Vạn Xuân).
4. Ngô Quyền – First criteria. Leader of the revolt against the Southern Han invasion, which ended the Third Era of Northern Domination, and founder of the Ngô dynasty.
5. Đinh Bộ Lĩnh – Second criteria. The military commander who re-unified Vietnam after the anarchy of the 12 warlords, founder of the Đinh dynasty, the first emperor in Vietnamese history, named the country Đại Cồ Việt.
6. Lê Hoàn – First and second criteria. The military commander who led the country against the Song invasion and founded the Early Lê dynasty.
7. Lý Thái Tổ – Second criteria. Founder of the Lý dynasty, most well-known for his relocation of the capital from Hoa Lư to Đại La (modern-day Hanoi).
8. Lý Thường Kiệt – Third criteria. The military commander of the Lý dynasty who led the country against the Song invasion, was thought to be the author of Nam quốc sơn hà (nicknamed "Vietnam's First Declaration of Independence").
9. Trần Nhân Tông – First and third criteria. The third emperor of the Trần dynasty who led the country against the Mongol invasion.
10. Trần Hưng Đạo – Third criteria. The military commander of the Trần dynasty who led the country against the Mongol invasion.
11. Lê Lợi – First and second criteria. Leader of the Lam Sơn revolt against the Ming dynasty, which ended the Fourth Era of Northern Domination, and founder of the Later Lê dynasty.
12. Nguyễn Trãi – Third criteria. Politician and scholar of the Later Lê dynasty, author of Bình Ngô đại cáo (nicknamed "Vietnam’s Second Declaration of Independence").
13. Quang Trung – First and third criteria. Leader of the peasant revolt against the Revival Lê dynasty, ended the Trịnh-Nguyễn War and re-unified Vietnam, founded the Tây Sơn dynasty, defeated the Siam and the Qing dynasty.
14. Hồ Chí Minh – First and third criteria. Founder of Việt Minh independence movement and the Democratic Republic of Vietnam, led the country against the Japanese (August Revolution), the French (First Indochina War) and the American (Second Indochina War), was often regarded as the "Father of the Nation" (Cha già dân tộc).
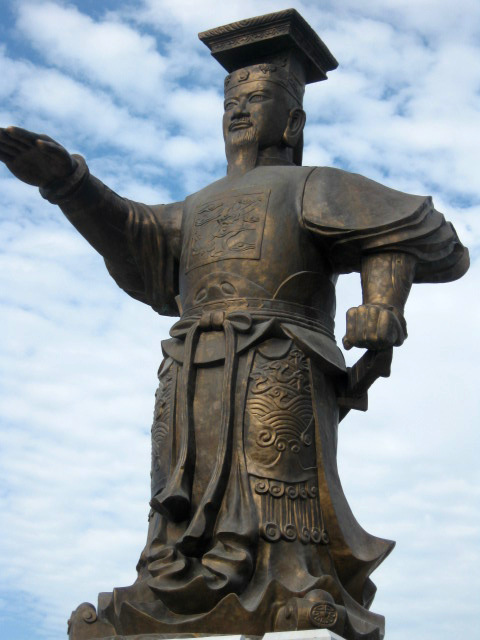
Statue of Đinh Tiên Hoàng (Ninh Bình)

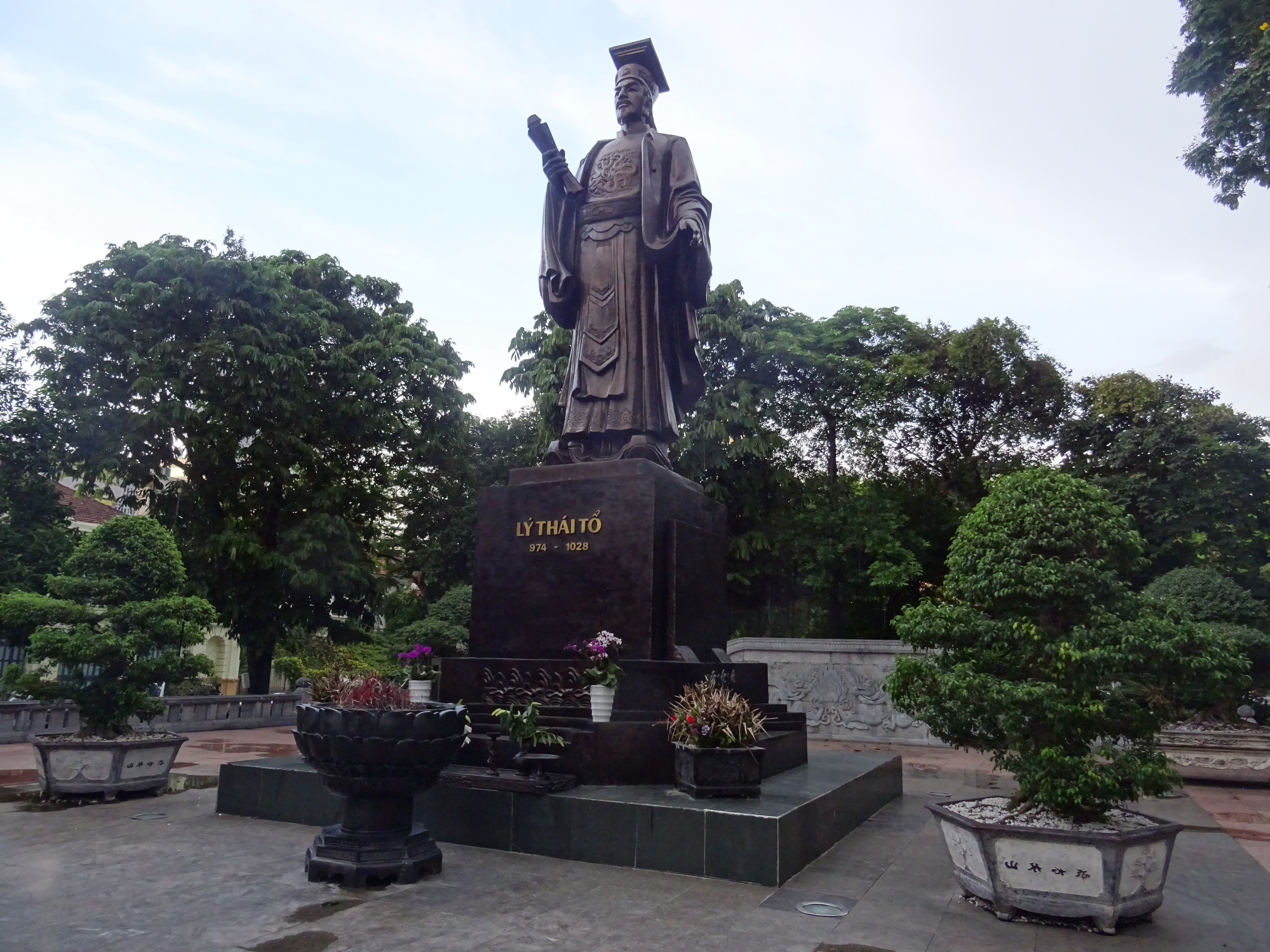
Statue of Lý Thái Tổ (Hanoi)

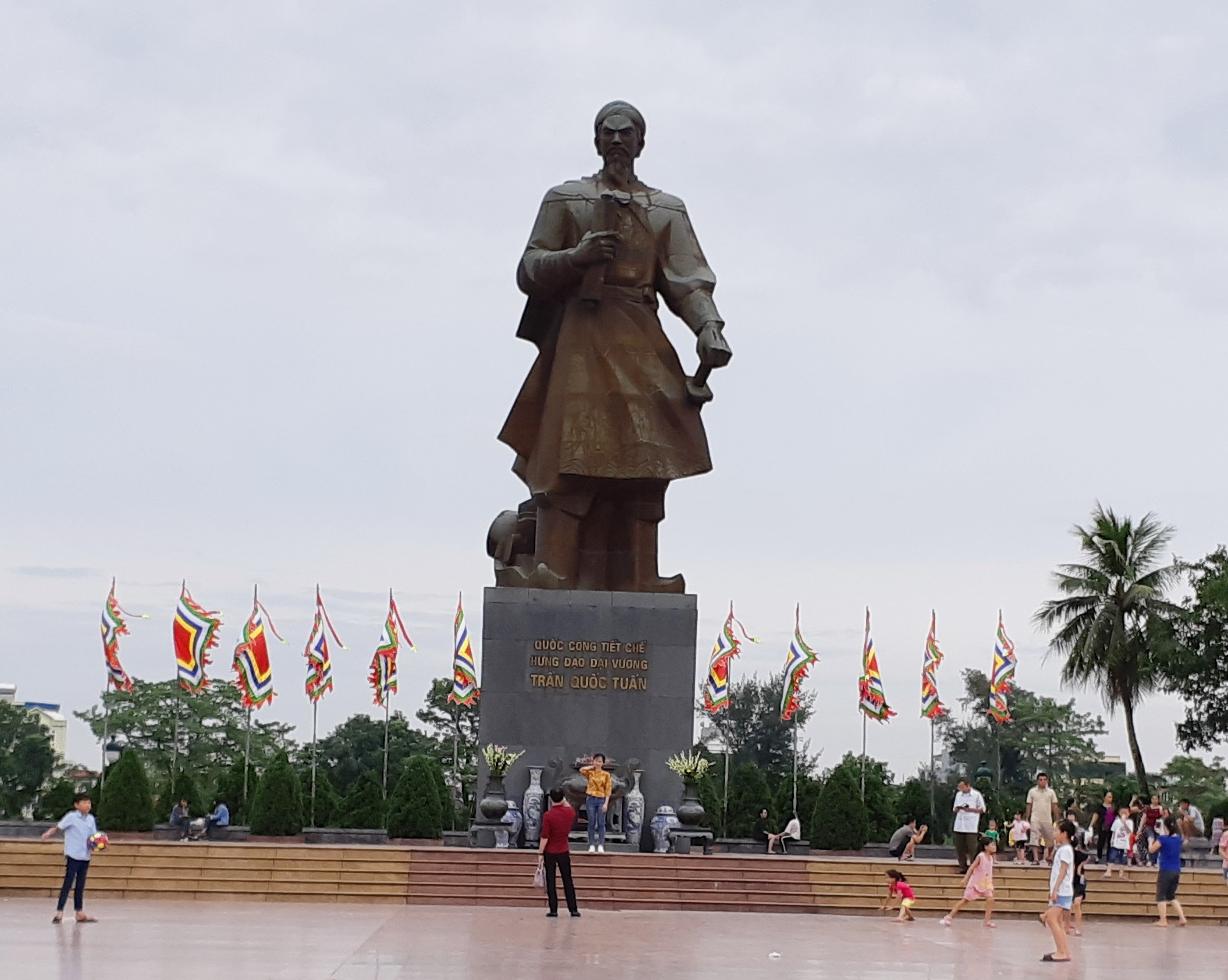
Statue of Trần Hưng Đạo (Nam Định)

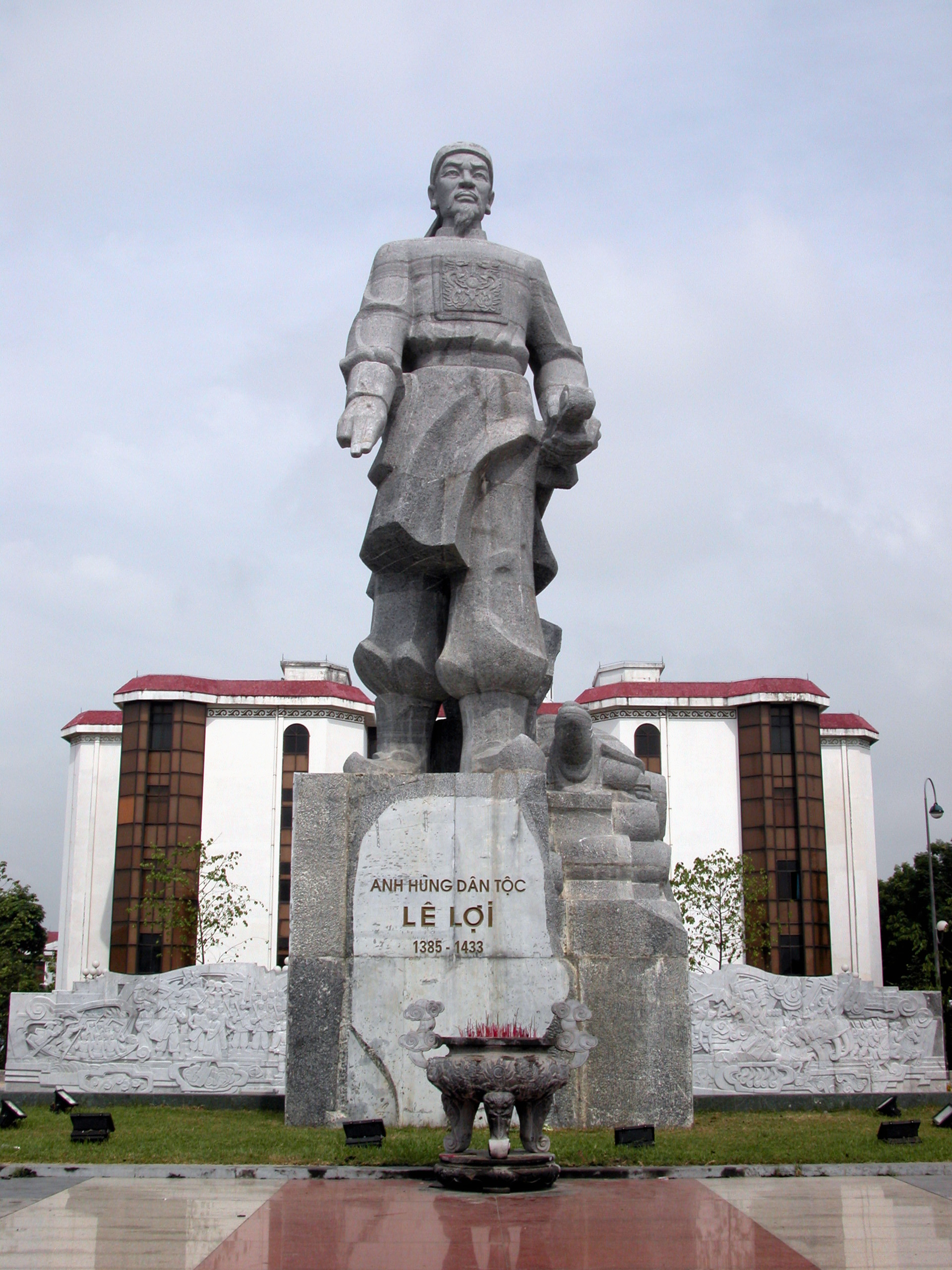
Statue of Lê Lợi (Thanh Hóa)

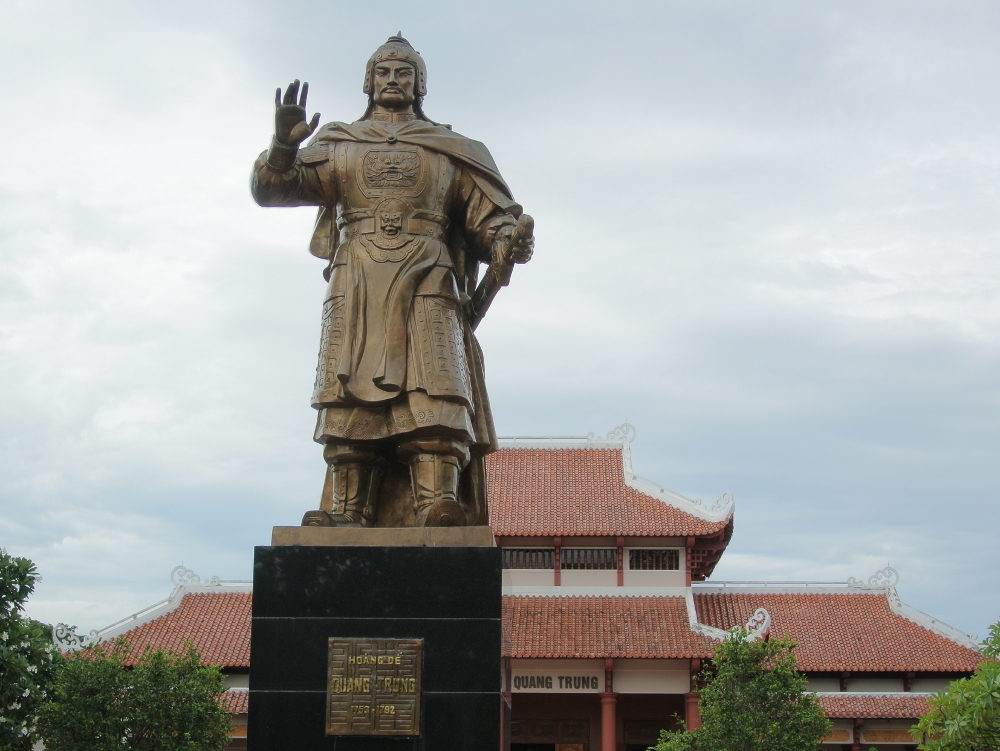
Statue of Quang Trung (Quang Trung Museum, Bình Định)

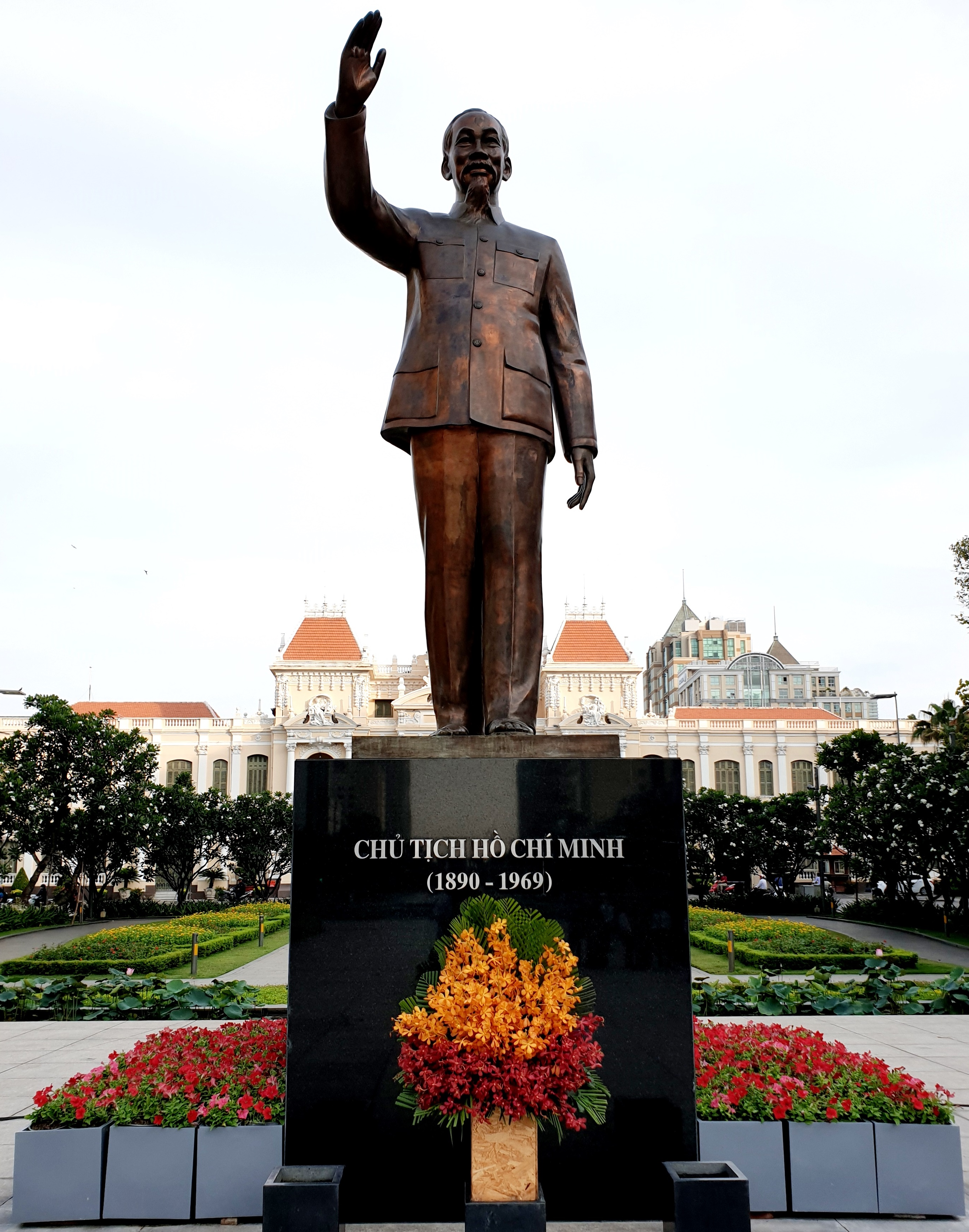
Statue of Hồ Chí Minh (HCM City Hall)

== South Vietnam’s version ==
During its existence, South Vietnam also had a list of prominent figures known as the Holy Ancestors of the RVN Military Forces (Vietnamese: Thánh Tổ Quân lực VNCH). They were:

1. An Dương Vương – Holy Ancestor of the Engineer Corps (Thánh tổ Công Binh), Holy Ancestor of the Artillery (Thánh tổ Pháo Binh).
2. Thánh Gióng – Holy Ancestor of the Armored Cavalry Corps (Thánh tổ Thiết Giáp).
3. Trần Nguyên Hãn – Holy Ancestor of the Signal Corps (Thánh tổ Truyền Tin). (Note: Trần Nguyên Hãn was a military commander of the Lam Sơn rebels.)
4. Phan Đình Phùng – Holy Ancestor of the Ordnance Corps (Thánh tổ Quân Cụ).
5. Trần Hưng Đạo – Holy Ancestor of the Navy (Thánh tổ Hải Quân).
6. Archangel Michael – Holy Ancestor of the Airborne Division (Thánh Tổ Binh chủng Nhảy Dù).
7. Yết Kiêu – Holy Ancestor of the Frogmen Unit (Thánh tổ lực lượng Người nhái). (Note: Phạm Hữu Thế (Yết Kiêu) was an admiral of the Trần dynasty's navy.)
8. Lê Lợi – Holy Ancestor of the Regional Forces (Thánh tổ lực lượng Địa phương quân và nghĩa quân).
9. Nguyễn Tri Phương – Holy Ancestor of the Ground Forces (Thánh tổ Bộ binh).

Statues of these figures were built across Saigon before 1975. After the Communist takeover, the statue of Archangel Michael was destroyed, the statues of Trần Nguyên Hãn, Lê Lợi, and An Dương Vương (Artillery version) were removed to make way for construction projects; meanwhile, the statues of An Dương Vương (Engineer Corps version), Thánh Gióng, and Phan Đình Phùng were still kept in place though have been damaged over time. Currently, there is a project to repair and replace these statues.

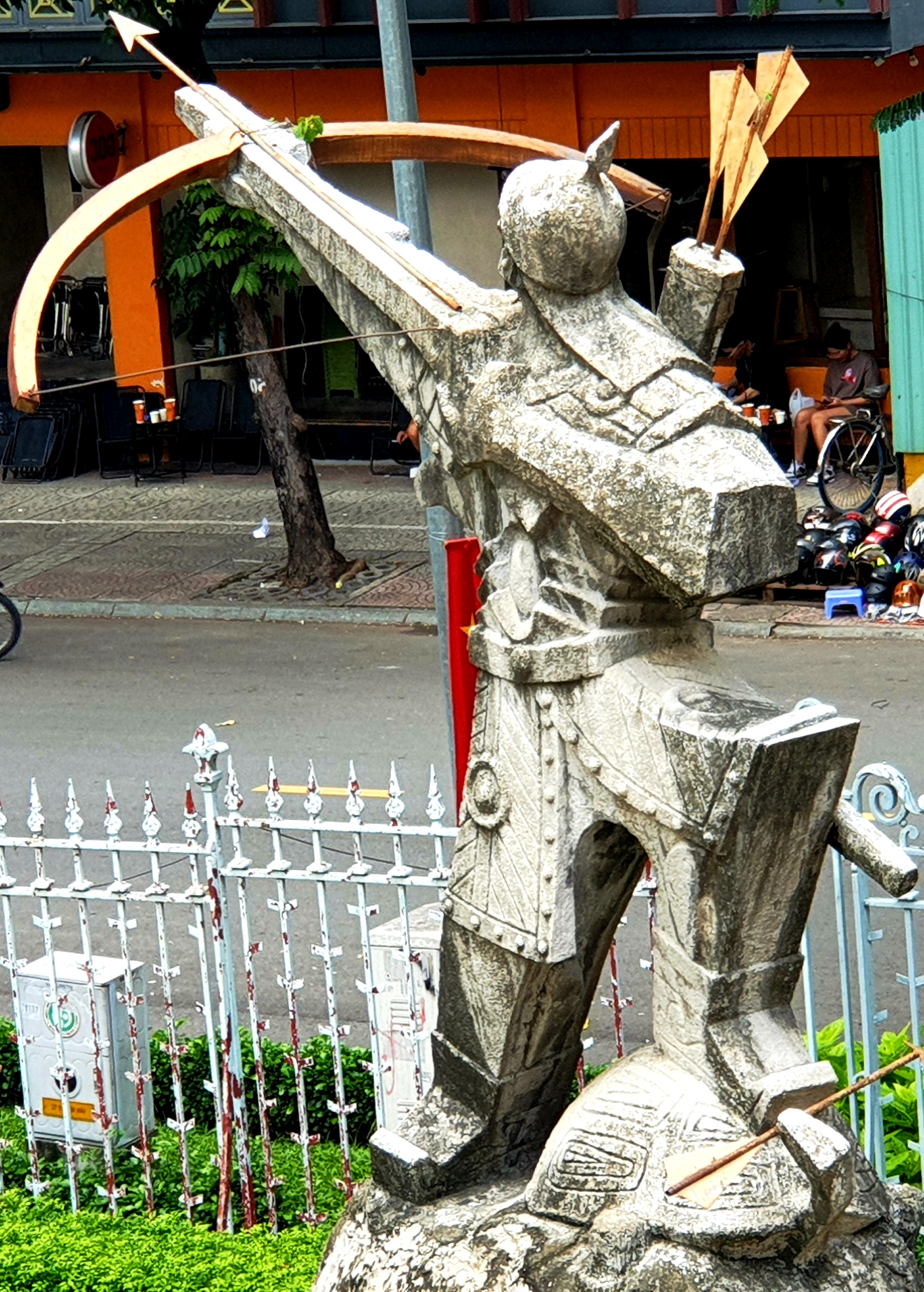
Artillery Statue of An Dương Vương

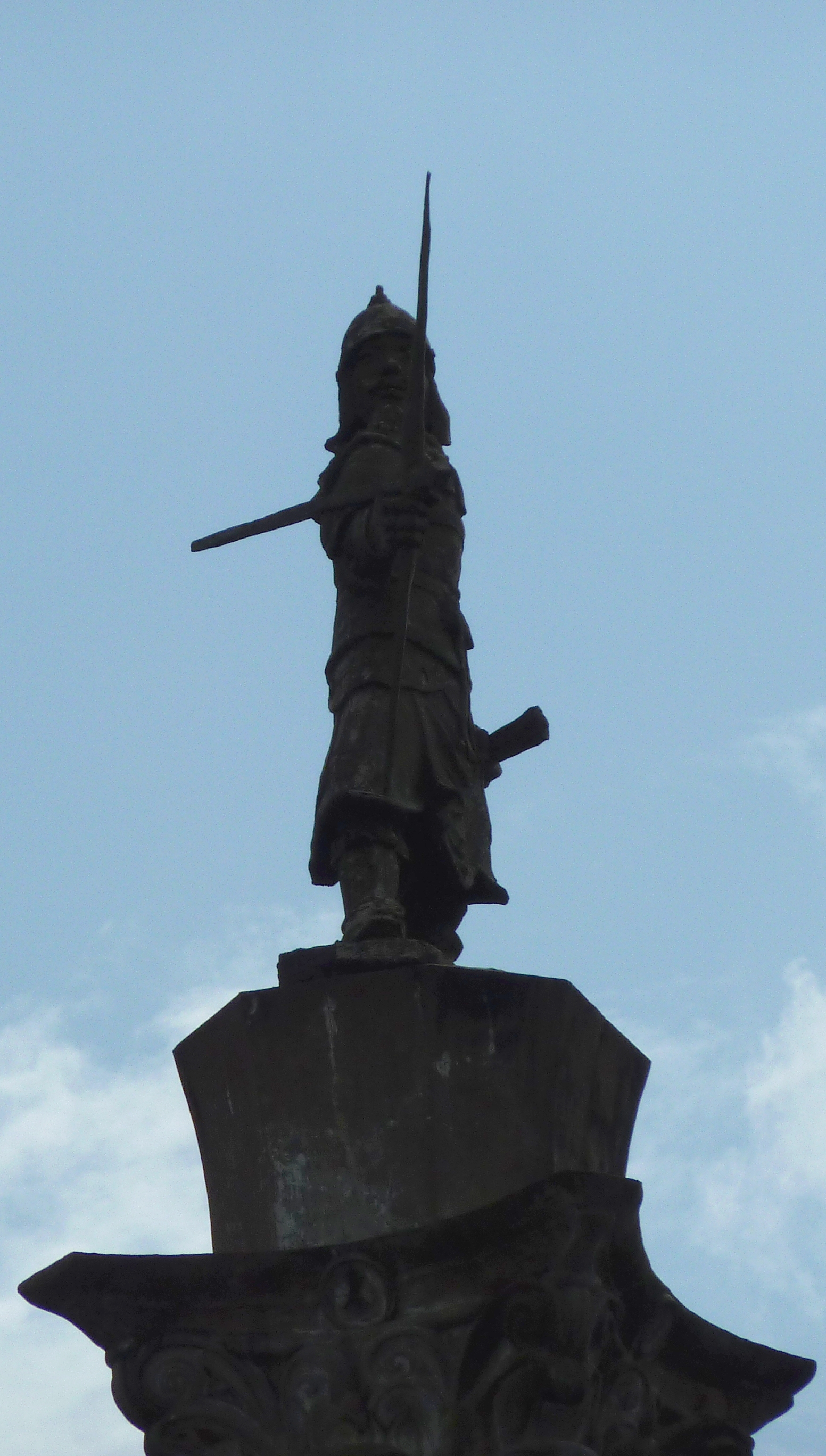
Engineer Corps Statue of An Dương Vương

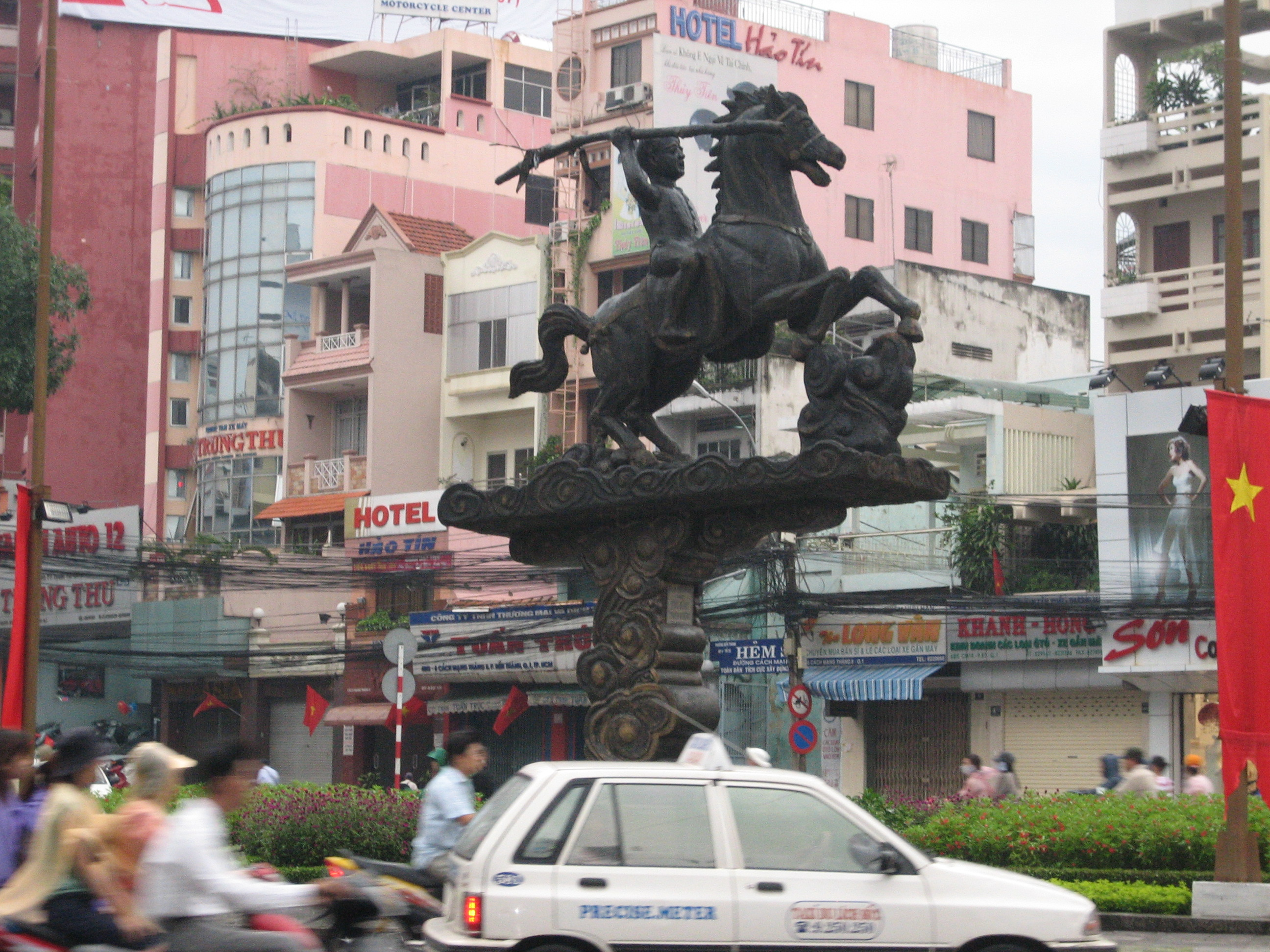
Statue of Thánh Gióng

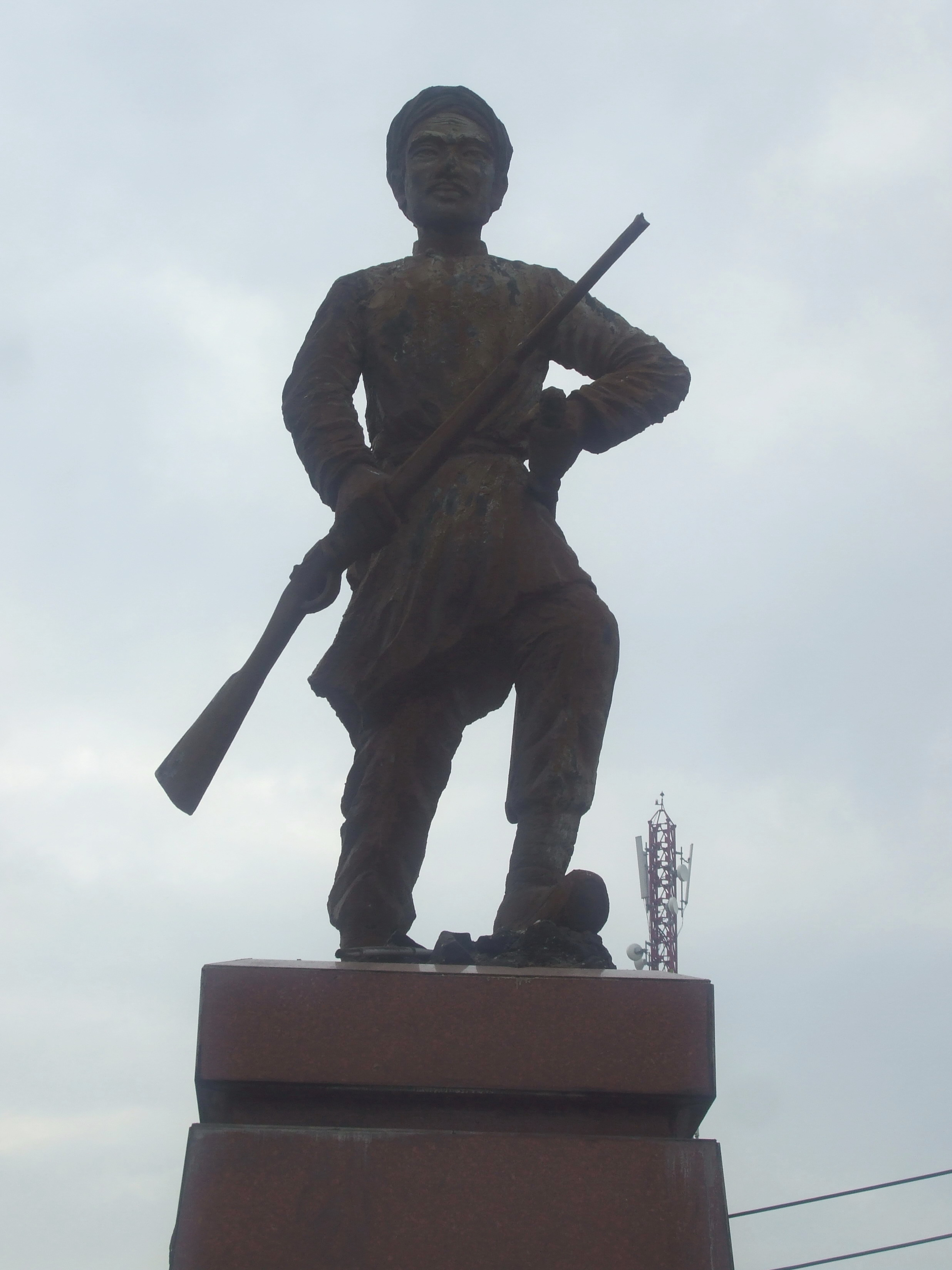
Statue of Phan Đình Phùng

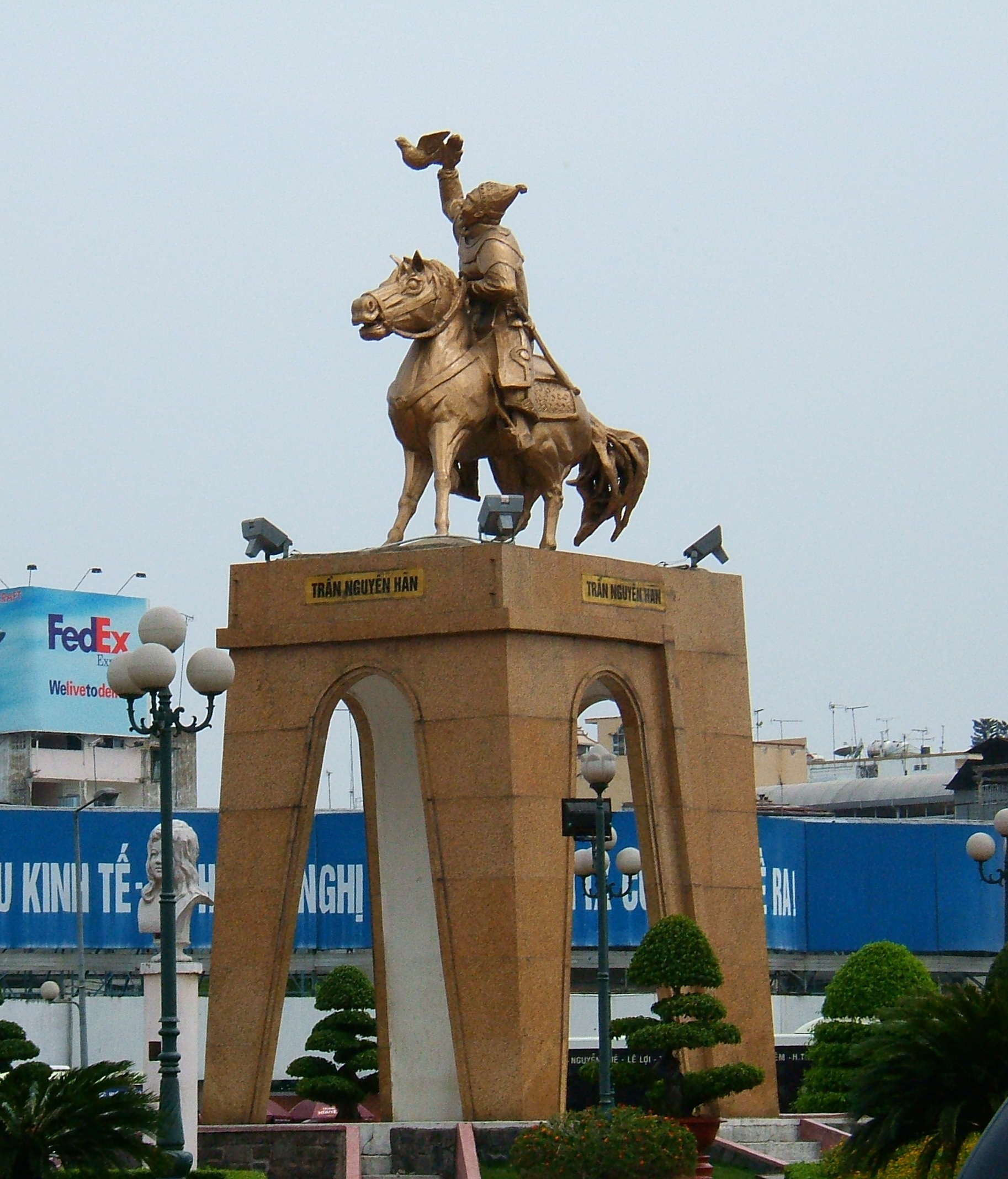
Statue of Trần Nguyên Hãn

== See also ==
- Orders, decorations, and medals of Vietnam
- Hero of the People's Armed Forces (Vietnam)
- Hero of Labor (Vietnam)
