= Naval history of Vietnam =

Army and warfare made their first appearance in Vietnamese history during the 3rd millennium BC. Throughout thousands of years, wars played a great role in shaping the identity and culture of people inhabited the land which is modern day Vietnam.

== Early period ==
From the beginning of the founding of the Vietnamese Nation in the 1st millennium BC, the Hùng Vương period spawned many legends of fighting against seaborne invasions of Quynh Chau (now China) from the north and Ho Ton (later to become Champa) from the south. During the era of the Kingdom of Âu Lạc, when the Cổ Loa Citadel was constructed, King An Dương Vương relied on the Hoang Giang River as a natural fortification to protect the south flank of the citadel. In the 6th century, Emperor Lý Nam Đế built naval forces to fend off the invasion of Liang dynasty's (China) forces in the Tô Lịch River, Dien Triet lake; and then, King Triệu Quang Phục used guerrilla tactics against the Chinese military at Da Trach lagoon (Khoái Châu, Hải Dương).

In the 10th century, the Imperial Vietnamese Navy became a regularised force. Naval forces of Khúc Thừa Dụ in Hong Chau (now Ninh Giang District, Hải Dương), Dương Đình Nghệ in Ai Chau, Thanh Hóa and of King Ngô Quyền himself were raised by enlisting and training the fishermen along rivers and seasides. Those elements became well-trained and experienced naval forces, ready to protect the country.

== Dynastic period ==
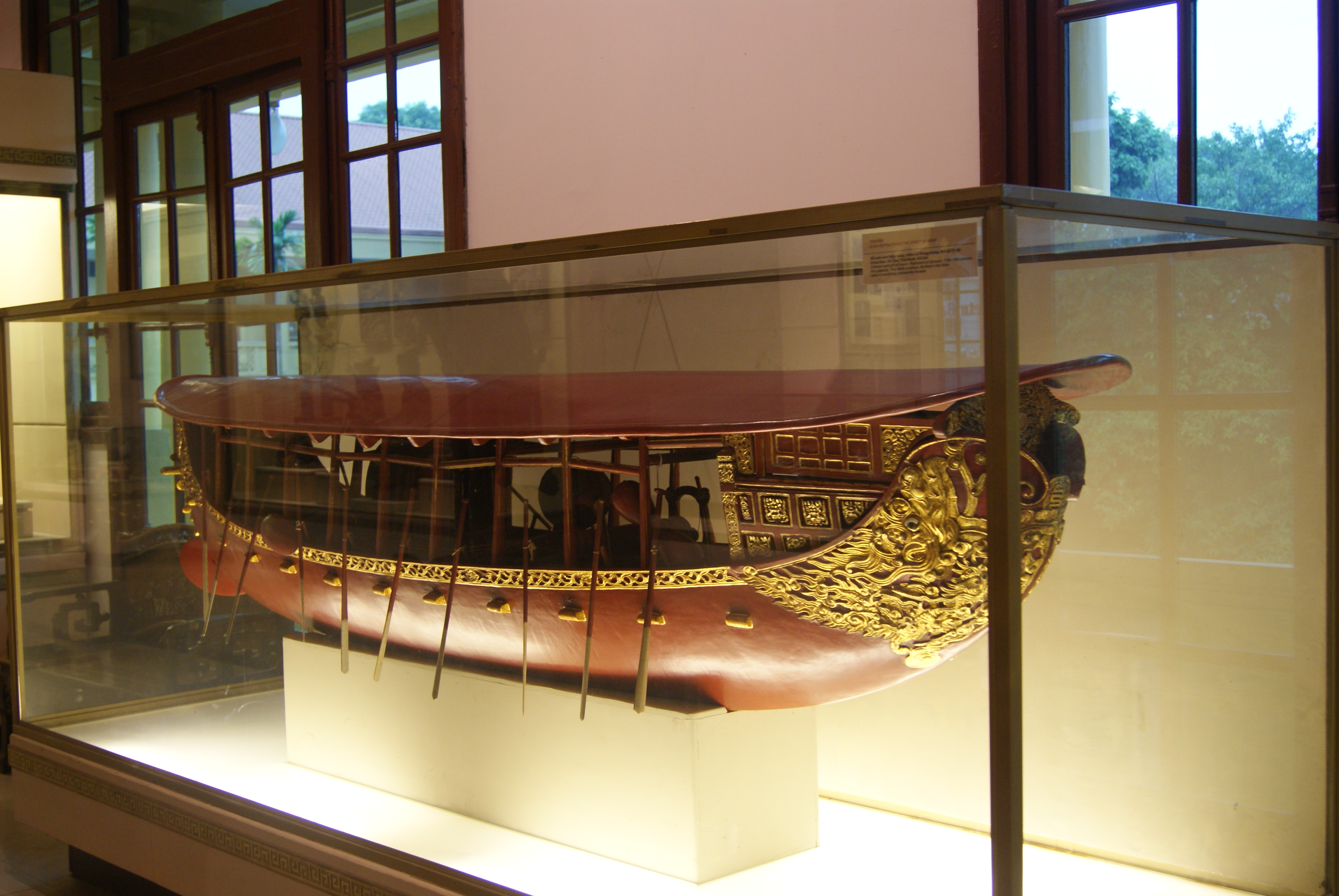
Model of 17th century gunboat

In Lý–Trần dynasty era, the dynasties were occupied with raising naval forces and naval bases. Particularly, the Vân Đồn port had an important role in protecting the northeast territorial waters of Vietnam. In 1075 Lý Thường Kiệt mobilised a fleet to ferry 50,000 marines across the Gulf of Tonkin to invade Qinzhou, China. The amphibious assault was well planned and executed with incredible speed that Qinzhou's garrison was totally taken by surprise. The fortress town was taken in one night.

To retaliate, the Song dynasty of China mustered a huge invasion force, with a naval arm to provide support to land operations. They were already fearful of Vietnam's reputation at sea combat, thus a large enough force was organised so as to "not lose even if they can't score a win". Lý Kế Nguyên, a Vietnamese commander stationed in Vân Đồn, Quảng Ninh, however, had absolute confidence in his fleet that he went on the offensive and took on the Chinese invasion fleet on the high sea. Lý defeated the Chinese so badly that their admiral sent messengers to urge Chinese coastal guards to fortify their post in fear of a reverse-invasion.

In 1077, the Imperial Vietnamese Navy fought the Battle of Như Nguyệt River against the Chinese Song dynasty forces. This was the final battle Song dynasty would fight on Vietnamese land or waters. The battle lasted for several months, and ended with the victory of the Vietnamese Navy and the loss of many Song sailors. This victory demonstrated the successful tactics of war and active defence of the famous Admiral Lý Thường Kiệt who faced a naval force numerically superior to his own. The Song dynasty lost a total of 8,000 soldiers/sailors and 5.19 million ounces of silver, including all costs of the war.

The Đại Việt sử ký toàn thư records that in 1467 in An Bang province of Đại Việt (now Quảng Ninh Province) a Chinese ship blew off course onto the shore. The Chinese were detained and not allowed to return to China as ordered by Emperor Lê Thánh Tông. This incident may be the same one where Wu Rui was captured. One of the renowned victories in Vietnamese naval history was the Battle of Rạch Gầm-Xoài Mút in Tây Sơn dynasty, during which Nguyễn Huệ (Emperor Quang Trung) defeated the Siamese (Thai) naval force. The battle occurred in present-day Tiền Giang Province on 19 January 1785. Nguyễn Huệ's forces completely destroyed over 50,000 Siamese sailors and 300 warships.

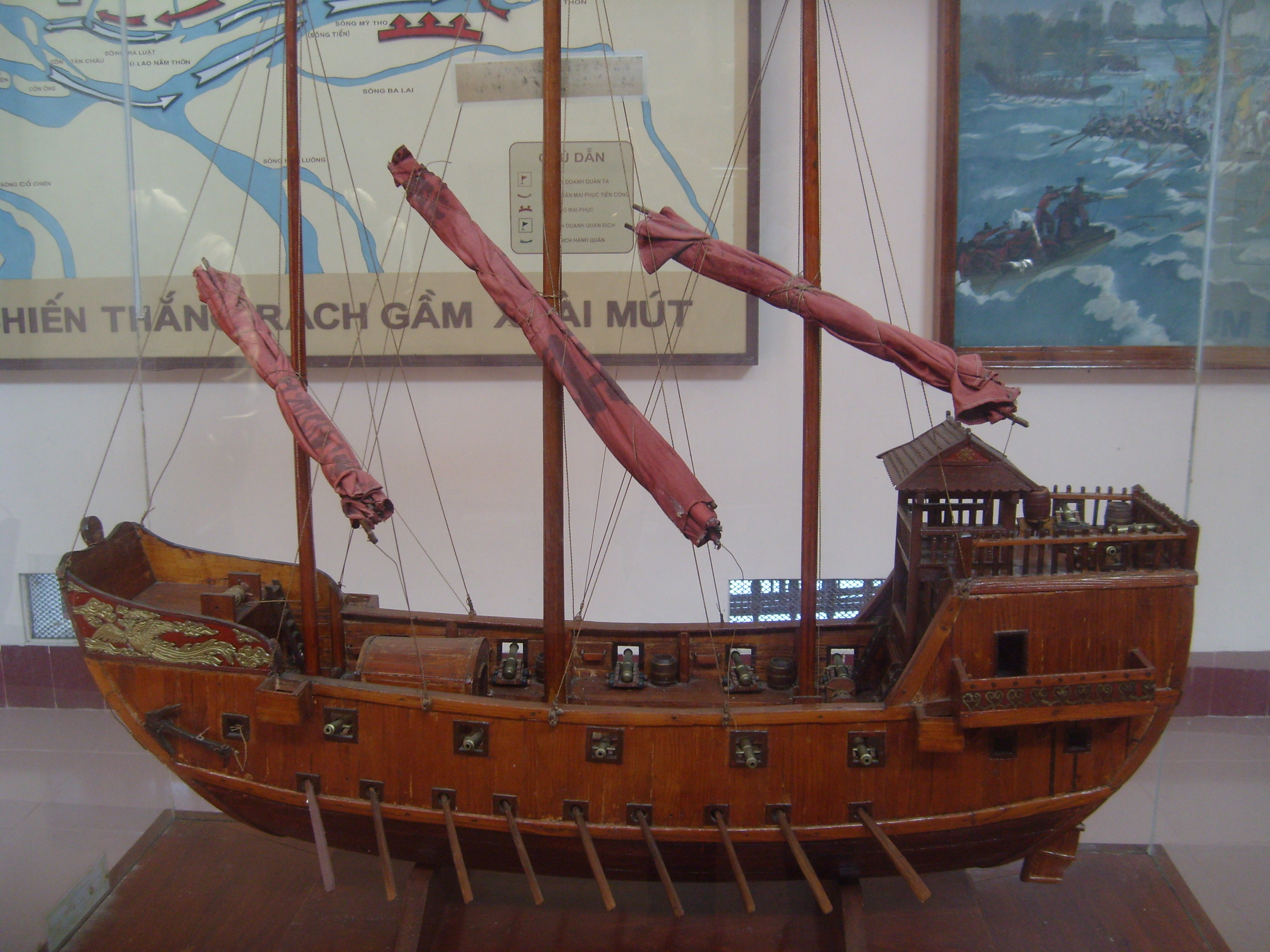
Model of warship used by Nguyễn Huệ in the Battle of Rạch Gầm-Xoài Mút

In the Nguyễn dynasty period, 19th century Nguyen Emperor Gia Long used his new Chu Su Naval workshop to improve the Vietnamese Navy. Gia Long had first attempted to acquire modern naval vessels in 1781, when on the advice of Bishop Pigneau de Behaine, he had chartered Portuguese vessels of European design, complete with crew and artillery. This initial experience proved to be disastrous. For reasons that remain unclear, two of the vessels fled in the midst of battle against the Tây Sơn, while angry Vietnamese soldiers killed the third crew.

In 1789, Pigneau de Behaine returned to Vietnam from Pondicherry with two vessels, which stayed in the Nguyễn dynasty service long-term. Over time, Vietnamese sailors replaced the original French and Indian crew under the command of French officers. These vessels became the foundation for an expanded military and merchant Nguyễn dynasty naval force, with Gia Long chartering and purchasing more European vessels to reinforce Vietnamese-built ships. However, traditional Vietnamese-style galleys and small sailing ships remained the majority of the fleet. In 1799, a British trader by the name of Berry reported that the Nguyễn dynasty's fleet had departed Saigon along the Saigon River with 100 galleys, 40 junks, 200 smaller boats and 800 carriers, accompanied by three European sloops. In 1801, one naval division was reported to have included nine European vessels armed with 60 guns, five vessels with 50 guns, 40 with 16 guns, 100 junks, 119 galleys and 365 smaller boats.

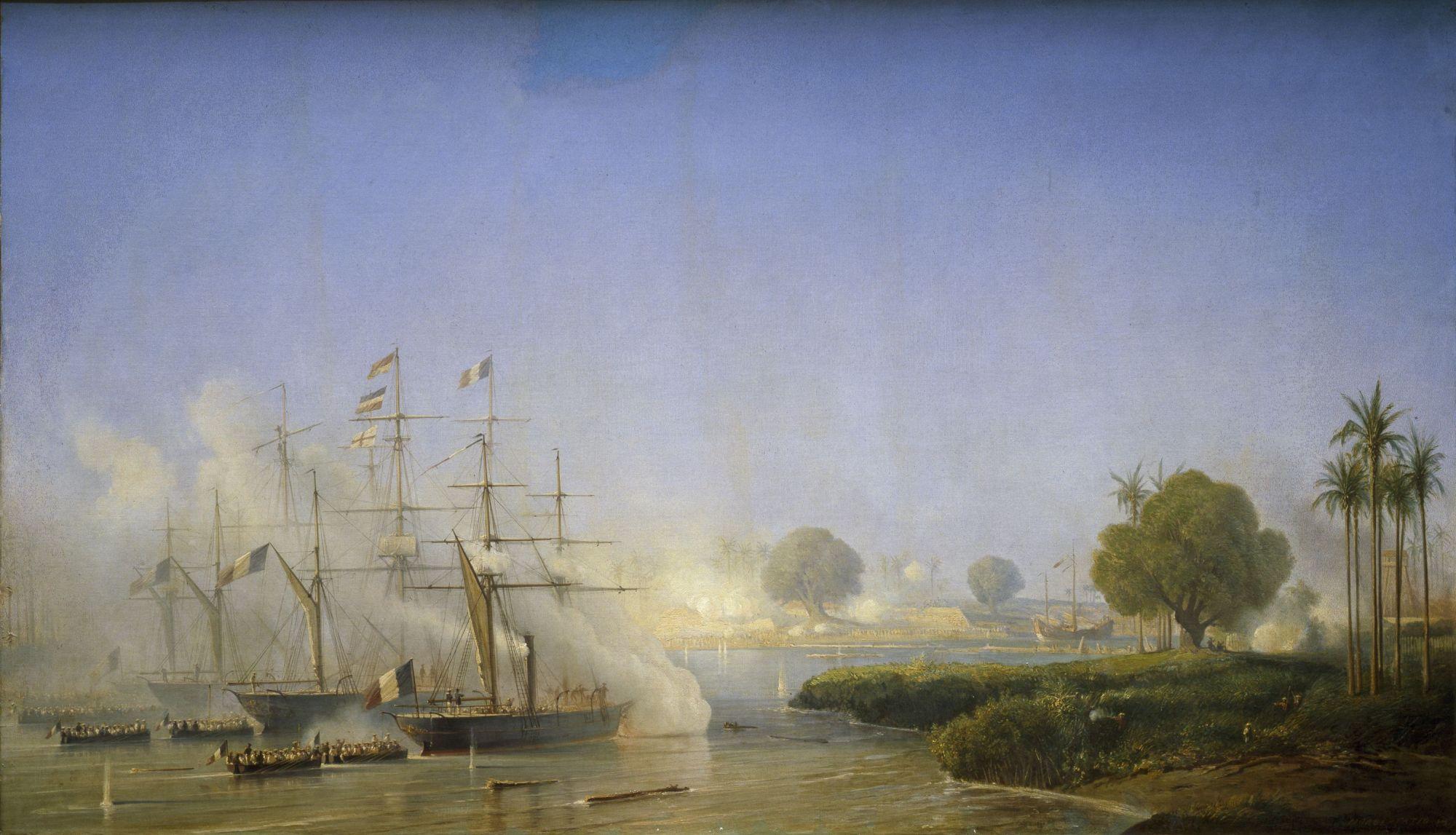
French ships invaded Saigon with the flûte Esperance that was sunk in 1861 by Nguyễn Trung Trực's naval forces

In the middle of the 19th century, the Vietnamese Navy fought against the French in many battles. Due to disadvantages in technology, the Vietnamese Navy could not defeat the French Navy, but there were still several battles during which the Vietnamese Navy caused heavy damages to the French. The Vietnamese were especially successful in the Battle of Nhat Tao canal held by Nguyễn Trung Trực on 10 December 1861. Nguyễn Trung Trực's naval forces ambushed the French brig L'Esperance at the Vam Co River, Mekong Delta. Truc's 150 men were grouped into three columns. The first group of 61 sailors under Hoang Khac Nhuong was to attack a nearby pro-French village to provoke an incident and lure the French forces into an ambush. Truc commanded the second group of 59 partisans along with Vo Van Quang, and was assigned to burn and sink the vessel. A third force of 30 sailors was commanded by Ho Quang and Nguyen Van Hoc. Due to the surprise attack, the French Navy suffered major damage: the brig L'Esperance was sunk, 17 French sailors and 20 pro-French Vietnamese naval auxiliaries were killed, only eight people escaped, including two French sailors and six sailors of Tagal (Filipino) background employed by the French.

== Sources ==
- Phan Huy Lê; Bùi Đăng Dũng; Phan Đại Doãn; Phạm Thị Tâm; Trần Bá Chí (1998). Một số trận quyết chiến chiến lược trong lịch sử dân tộc ta. (Some decisive strategic battles in our nation's history). Nhà xuất bản Quân đội Nhân dân (People's Army Publishing House).
