= Battle of Như Nguyệt River (1077) =

Mongol-Vietnamese battle

- Part of Song–Vietnamese war (1075–1077)
Date	18 January 1077 – 28 February 1077 (4 weeks)
Location	Cầu River, Bắc Ninh Province, northern Vietnam 21°07′26″N 106°17′52″E
Result	Inconclusive

Belligerents
Song dynasty	Lý dynasty

Commanders and leaders
Guo Kui; Zhao Jie	Lý Thường Kiệt; Hoằng Chân †; Chiêu Văn †; Thân Cảnh Phúc †; Lý Kế Nguyên; Lưu Ba

Strength
50,000–100,000 soldiers, 200,000 draftees	Unknown, 400 boats
- Location in Vietnam

The Battle of Như Nguyệt River, also called the Battle of the Cầu River, took place during the final phase of the Song–Vietnamese Border War (1075–1077). The battle occurred along parts of the Cầu River that flows through what later became Bắc Ninh Province of Hanoi in February 1077. At the battle, the Vietnamese led by admiral-general Lý Thường Kiệt stopped the Chinese attempt to cross the river but failed to dislodge them from their position, resulting in a stalemate at the river before the Song retreated due to mounting casualties. The war ended with a peace negotiation.

== Location ==
The Cầu River or the Fuliang River (in Chinese sources such as the Zizhi Tongjian Gangmu) flows through northeast Vietnam and is one of the major tributaries of the Red River. It stands as a major natural barrier between the mountainous Sino-Viet borderland and the Red River Delta, the heart of the Vietnamese state. The location of the battle was along the river that flows through modern-day Bắc Ninh Province.

== Background ==
By the 1050s, the Vietnamese kingdom Dai Viet under the rule of the Lý dynasty king Lý Thánh Tông (Lý Nhật Tôn, r. 1055–1072) had rapidly expanded its borders to the north, and subdued many indigenous groups into its mandalas, such as the Nùng and Tày people. This resulted in violent border disputes with the Song Empire. In 1065, Thánh Tông allied with Nùng leaders Nùng Tông Đản and Lưu Kỷ, which the Chinese saw as threatening to their southern interests.

When Lý Càn Đức (r. 1072–1127) became king of Dai Viet in 1072, border disturbances between the Song and the Vietnamese escalated into war. In late 1075, to demonste against growing Chinese military presence in the border region and also to expand his territories, Lý Càn Đức ordered his Regent General Lý Thường Kiệt to launch an invasion of Southern China. Within three months, the Vietnamese took several fortified towns in Guangxi, killing 50,000 people in Nanning. The Viet surprise attack provoked Wang Anshi, the chief minister of the Song Empire. Wang urged the Emperor Shenzong (r. 1067–1085) to rally troops from the Tangut frontiers to the south for a counterattack. Although Wang's petition initially was opposed by his conservative oppositions; by September 1076 the Emperor had approved. The expedition comprised an army of approximately 100,000 troops and 200,000 draftees led by generals Guo Kui and Zhao Jie, they advanced and retook Nanning and Guangxi in late autumn.

The Song army crossed the southern frontiers in late 1076; Guo Kui commanded the main army and marched through Lạng Sơn while Zhao Jie advance through Cao Bằng plateau to destroy the Viet-Nung fighters. Later, two armies regrouped at the northern bank of the Cầu River in early 1077, waiting for naval reinforcement. To prepare for this, Lý Thường Kiệt ordered his men to build several lines of ramparts along the southern banks of the river through Bắc Ninh, covered them with thousands of bamboo sticks that were covered with incendiary mixtures as well as flammable oil; he also gathered around 400 boats to support the defensive lines. In Hanoi, the king and Buddhist monks opened an assembly to pray to the Buddha for a miracle.

== Battle ==
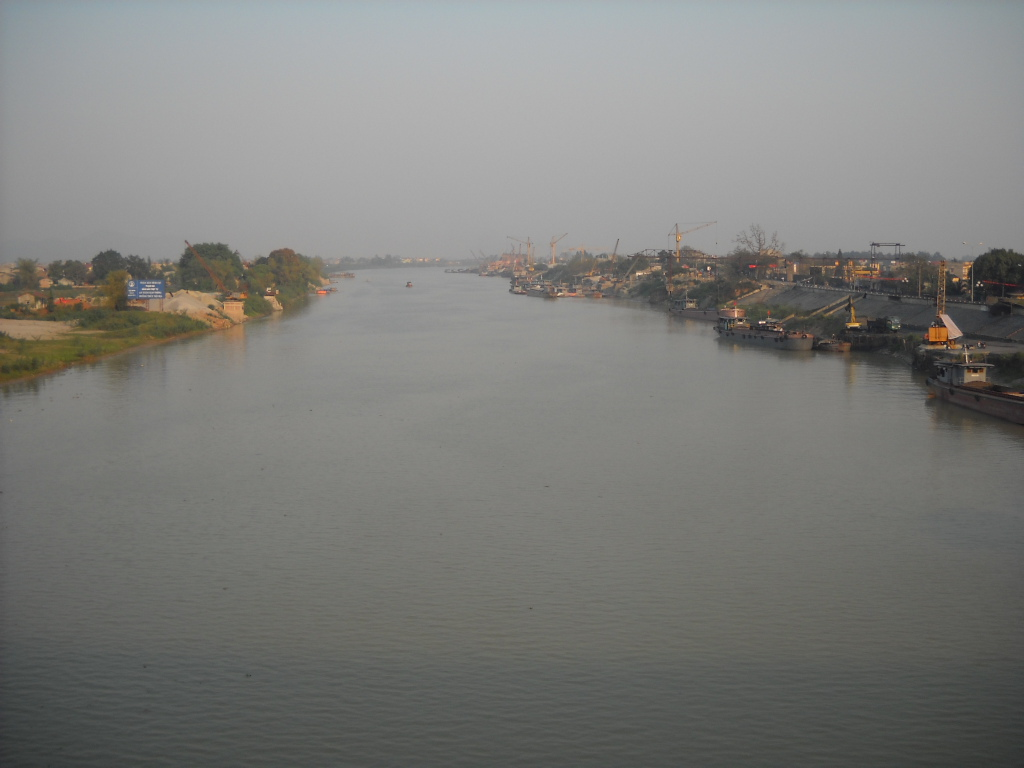
Cầu River and its southern embankments

By 1077, the Song had defeated forces from Cơ Lang and Quyết Lý and marched towards the Đại Việt capital at Thăng Long. Song forces convened at the Nhu Nguyệt River (in modern Bắc Ninh Province). Thường Kiệt regarded the defense of this river as crucial to the war effort because it presented the last chance to protect the delta region, where the tombs of former rulers and the village of the dynasty's founder were located. Thường Kiệt ordered his men to erect on the river's southern bank a large earthen rampart protected by lines of bamboo piles. Meanwhile, his fleet crossed the mouth of the Bạch Đằng River to block Song naval forces from supporting action. There was also a "water barrier" that covered the Bạch Đằng estuary. No detail of naval fighting survive except that "many sea battles" were fought in the starting months before any land battles occurred.

Zhao Xie ordered his soldiers to build catapults and floating bridges. The Song army gathered across the river from a hill where the Vietnamese could not see them. Bombardment from the catapults cleared the river of Viet vessels, making way for the Song bridges. Several hundred Song soldiers managed to cross before the bridges were burnt. They set fire to the bamboo defense walls but there were too many layers to break through. A vanguard cavalry forces rode within several kilometers of Thăng Long. As the Song forces took the offensive, the Viets strained to hold the front line. Lý Thường Kiệt tried to boost the morale of his soldiers by citing a poem before his army named "Nam quốc sơn hà". The poem so invigorated his forces that the Viets made a successful counterattack, pushing Song forces back across the river. Song forces tried to cross again but Thường Kiệt had previously built a defense system of spikes under the Như Nguyệt riverbed, and they were again pushed back, sustaining 1,000 casualties. Meanwhile, the Song naval attack was held back by the Viet coastal defense and failed to provide any assistance to Guo Kui.

Guo Kui led the Song army in another direction towards the nearby region of Phú Lương, where they bombarded Thường Kiệt's position. Thường Kiệt held out for a month, repulsing multiple attempts by Song forces to cross the river. He became overconfident and decided to make a frontal assault to disperse the Song army. He led his army under cover of night across the river and attacked the Song forces. As the Song front line was in danger of collapsing, reinforcements arrived and pushed back the Viet army back across the river. A Viet general was captured and two princes drowned in the fighting at Kháo Túc River.

According to Chinese sources, "tropical climate and rampant disease" severely weakened Song's military forces while the Viet court feared the result of a prolonged war so close to the capital. Song forces lost about 50%-60% before retreating, half of them dying to diseases. However Song forces continued to occupy the five disputed regions of Quảng Nguyên (renamed Shun'anzhou or Thuận Châu), Tư Lang Châu, Môn Châu, Tô Mậu Châu, and Quảng Lăng. Viet forces also continued to occupy Yongzhou, Qinzhou, and Lianzhou.

== Aftermath ==
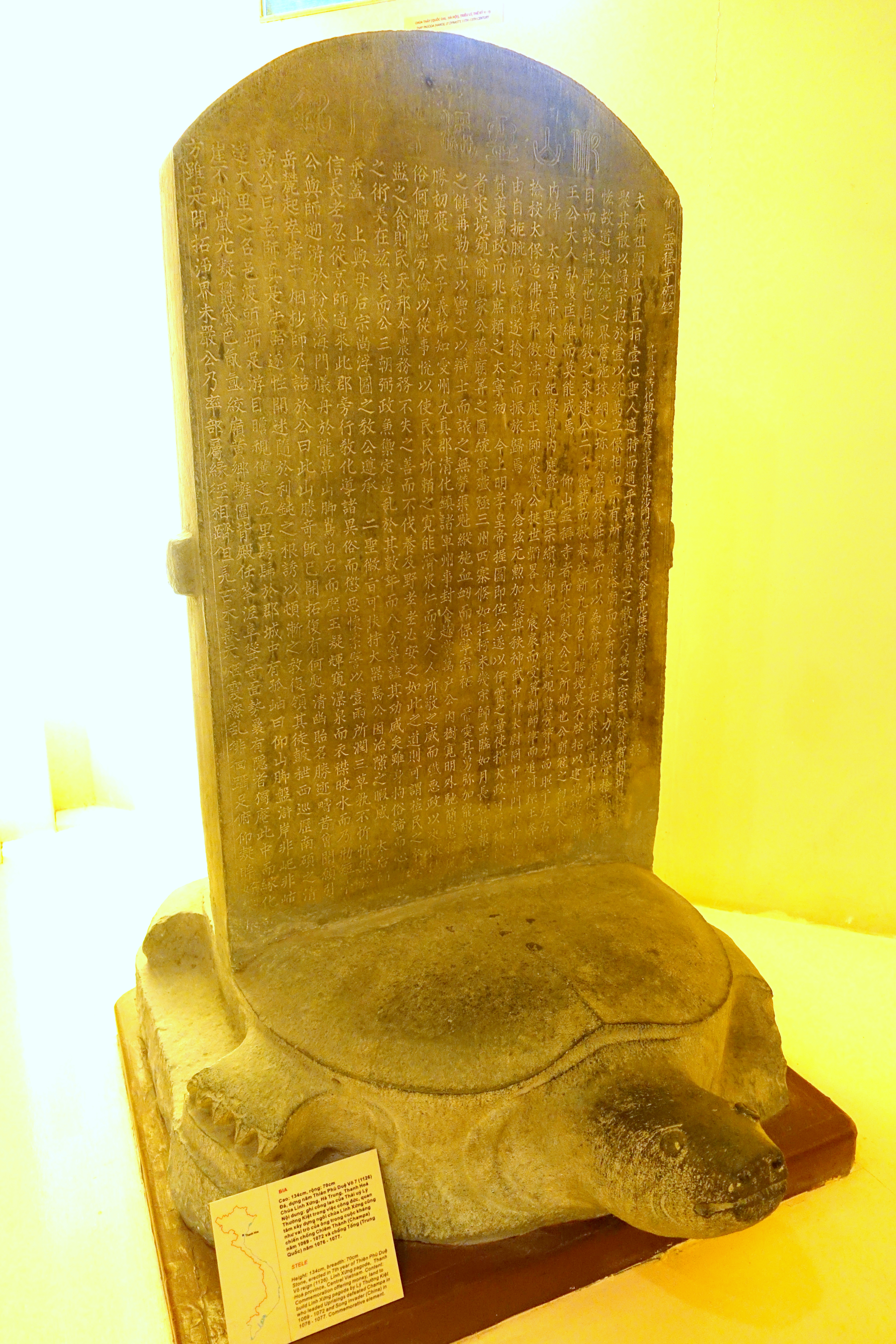
A survived stone inscription dated 1126 AD commemorates General Lý Thường Kiệt

As a result of mounting casualties on both sides, Thường Kiệt made peace overtures to the Song in 1077; the Song commander Guo Kui agreed to withdraw his troops but kept five disputed regions: Quảng Nguyên (renamed Shun'anzhou or Thuận Châu), Tư Lang Châu, Môn Châu, Tô Mậu Châu, and Quảng Lăng. These areas now comprise most of modern Vietnam's Cao Bằng Province and Lạng Sơn Province. Đại Việt held control of the Yong, Qin and Lian prefectures.

Minor clashes continued to occur. In the spring of 1077, Song soldiers raided a holy temple and seized an Amitābha sculpture but abandoned it in the forest when they fled from a Vietnamese ambush. The Buddha was thought to be lost until a fire during the dry season consumed that forest and villagers reported the miracle to the king, and he returned the Buddha statue to Phật Tích temple with great honors. In 1079 the Song arrested and executed the Nùng leader Nùng Trí Xuân while taking his family as hostages. In 1083, the Vietnamese attacked Guihua under the pretense of pursuing Nong Zhihui, the brother of Nong Zhigao.

In 1082, after a long period of mutual isolation, King Lý Nhân Tông of Đại Việt returned Yong, Qin, and Lian prefectures back to Song authorities, along with their prisoners of war, and in return the Song relinquished its control of four prefectures and counties in Đại Việt, including the Nùng clan's home of Quảng Nguyên. Further negotiations took place from July 6 to August 8, 1084, and were held at Song's Yongping garrison in southern Guangnan, where Đại Việt's Director of Military Personnel Lê Văn Thịnh (fl. 1038–1096) convinced the Song to fix the two countries' borders between Quảng Nguyên and Guihua prefectures.

The 14th-century Buddhist scripture Thiền uyển tập anh claimed that during his silent preparation for the counterattack in late February 1077, Lý Thường Kiệt incited his troops' morales by making a famous poem, known as the Nam Quốc Sơn Hà.

== See also ==
- Song–Vietnamese war (981)
- Song–Vietnamese war (1075–1077)
