= Declarations of independence of Vietnam =

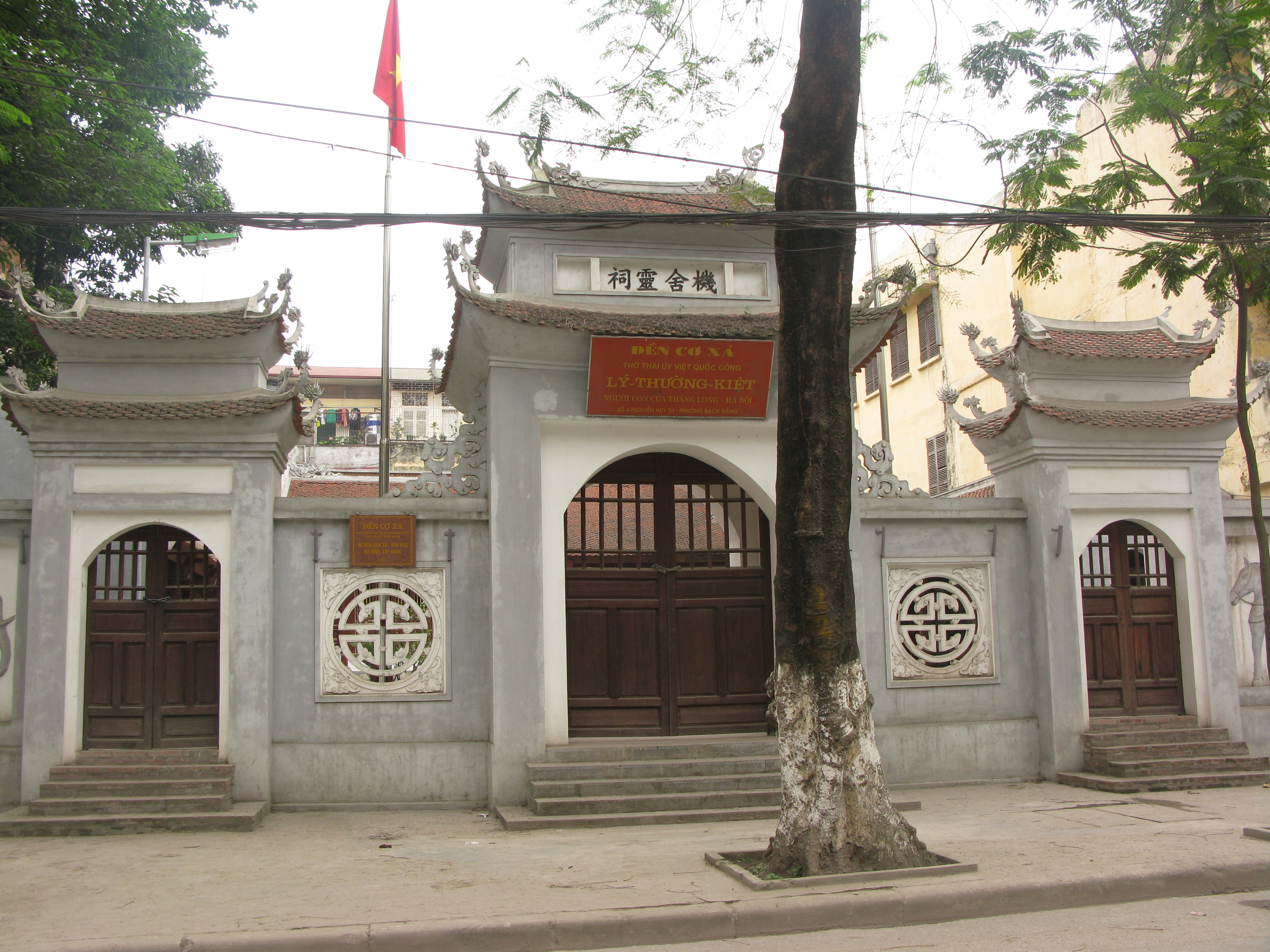
Cơ Xá Linh Từ - Temple of Lý Thường Kiệt - in Nguyễn Huy Tự street, Bạch Đằng ward (former Cơ Xá village), Hai Bà Trưng district, Hanoi.

Current Vietnamese historians consider Vietnam to have a total of three declarations of independence:

1. The poem Nam quốc sơn hà (Mountains and rivers of Southern country) was written in 1077 by Lý Thường Kiệt and recited next to the defense line of the Như Nguyệt river (Cầu river), originally with the reason to incentive the spirit of the soldiers.
2. Bình Ngô đại cáo (Great Proclamation upon the Pacification of the Wu) was written by Nguyễn Trãi to speak in the name of Bình Định vương Lê Lợi in the Đinh Mùi year (1427), announcing the pacification of the Ming army, regaining the national independence, establishing the Later Lê dynasty.
3. The Declaration of Independence (Tuyên ngôn độc lập) was written by Hồ Chí Minh and announced at Ba Đình Square, Hanoi, on September 2, 1945, declared independence from Japan and France, founding the Democratic Republic of Vietnam (North Vietnam).
