= Song–Đại Việt war =

Military conflict between the Song dynasty and Đại Việt

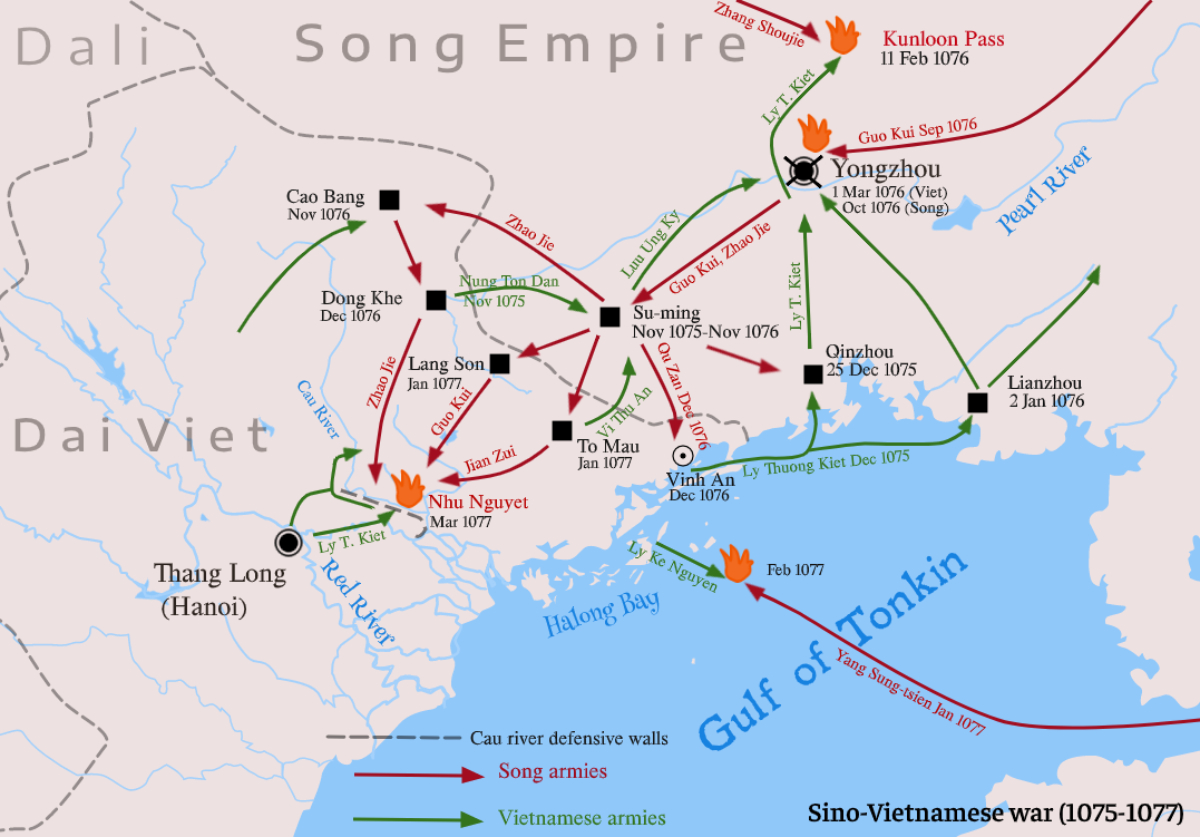
Date	1075–1077
Location	Song dynasty and Đại Việt
Result	Indecisive: Both sides agreed to withdraw; Captured territories held by both Song and Đại Việt were mutually exchanged in 1082, along with prisoners of war

Belligerents
Song dynasty Co-belligerents: Khmer Empire; Kingdom of Champa	Đại Việt

Commanders and leaders
Emperor Shenzong of Song; Guo Kui (郭逵); Zhao Xie (趙禼); Zhang Shoujie (張守節) †; Su Jian (蘇緘) †	Lý Nhân Tông; Lý Thường Kiệt; Nùng Tôn Đản; Thân Cảnh Phúc; Lưu Ưng Ký (POW)

Strength
Viet invasion of Guangnan West Circuit: Battle of Yongzhou: More than 2,800 regular troops Reinforcements: 80,000 troops Song Counteroffensive: 50,000 soldiers 100,000 supply train 100,000–870,000 regular troops and people	Viet invasion of Guangnan West Circuit: 80,000–100,000 troops Song Counteroffensive: 60,000 (estimate)

Casualties and losses
Viet invasion: 14th c. Vietnamese source: 100,000 killed in Guangxi; Song counterattack: 12th c. Chinese source: 200,000 deaths 13th c. Chinese source: 150,000 deaths Modern sources: At least 250,000–400,000 troops and civilians (including massacre of Yongzhou): More than half of Song troops died from disease during the counteroffensive against Đại Việt	~15,000 deaths at Yongzhou

The Song–Đại Việt war, also known as the Lý-Song War, was a military conflict between the Lý dynasty of Đại Việt and the Song dynasty of China between 1075 and 1077. The war was sparked by the shifting allegiances of tribal peoples such as the Zhuang/Nùng on the frontier borderlands, and increasing state control over their administration. In 1075, Emperor Lý Nhân Tông ordered a preemptive invasion of Song dynasty territory with more than 80,000 soldiers, razing the city of Yongzhou after a 42-day siege. The Song retaliated with an army of 300,000 the following year. In 1077, Song forces nearly reached Đại Việt's capital Thăng Long before being halted by General Lý Thường Kiệt at the Như Nguyệt River in modern-day Bắc Ninh Province.

After a prolonged stalemate and high casualties on both sides, Lý Thường Kiệt offered apologies for the invasion and the Song commander Guo Kui agreed to withdraw his troops, ending the war. Further negotiations were held in the following years that consolidated the border between the two empires.

== Background ==
=== Nùng Trí Cao rebellions ===
Nong Zhigao's movement in the Song dynasty

In the 1040s and 1050s, the Nong Zhigao rebellions of the Zhuang/Nùng leader Nùng Trí Cao (C. Nong Zhigao) in Quảng Nguyên (C. Guangyuan; now Cao Bằng Province) and his attempt to create an independent state on the borderlands of Đại Cồ Việt and the Song dynasty led to intensified relations between the two states. Nùng Trí Cao's failed rebellions and defeat by Viet forces and the Song general Di Qing (1008–1061) resulted in the removal of the tribal buffer zone between Đại Cồ Việt and the Song. His final defeat by the Song also had the effect of subordinating a large portion of that zone to direct Song control. The Viet court did not intervene in the matter and for 20 years after the Nùng Trí Cao rebellions, there was general peace along the border. However the regional power balance had been lost. Han Chinese military settlers moved in and new leaders took over the surviving communities. Several influential Nùng leaders sided with the Viet court. Crucial influences for the lead up to the event include the Song-court sponsored New Policies promoted by Wang Anshi and efforts by the Lý court to consolidate peripheral fiefdoms.

The Song and Đại Cồ Việt treated their frontier borderland peoples in different ways. Traditionally the Chinese Jimi system sought to introduce "uncultured" barbarians to the benefits of the "civilized" center. Viet leadership on the other hand created "patron-client" relationships using marriage alliances and military expeditions to maintain "satellite" partners. Successive Viet courts saw the extraction of resources from frontier vassals as a measurement of their efficacy. However by the 11th century, both the Chinese and Viet courts saw the frontier as a source of available troops famed for their ferocity. By 1065, around 44,500 militia had been recruited from these communities by the Song.

=== Song expansion ===
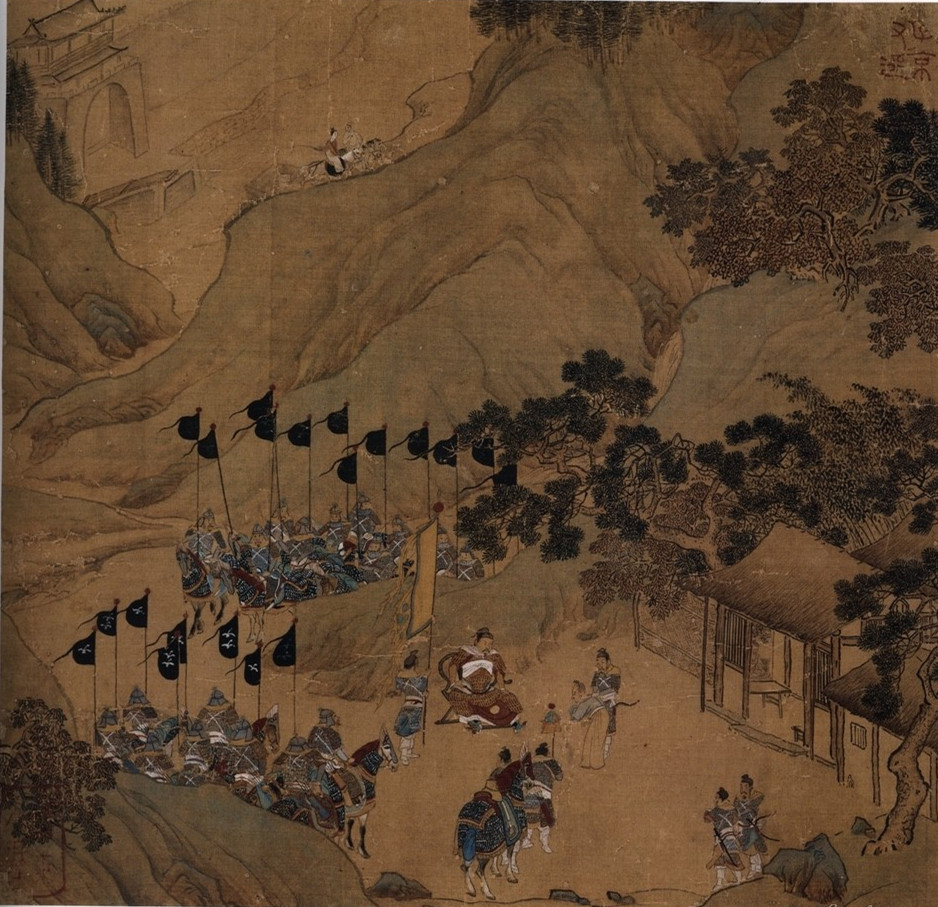
"Nong Zhigao Crossing the Border", Ming dynasty, 15th century

Frontier unrest began anew in 1057 when Nùng Tông Ðán (C. Nong Zongdan), a kinsman of Nùng Trí Cao, entered Song territory. The frontier administrator Wang Han visited Nùng Tông Ðán's camp at Leihuo (in Quang Nguyên) to discourage him from seeking inclusion in the Song dynasty since it would upset the Viet court. Instead he proposed that he stay outside Song territory as a loyal frontier militia leader. Wang feared that a resurgence of the Nùng clan would spell trouble for the frontier. The Song court ignored his apprehensions and offered the Nùng and other communities "Interior Dependency" status. By 1061, Emperor Renzong of Song (r. 1022-63) was regretting his decision and lamented that the "Nùng Bandit" and his kin had strayed far from their frontier duties and might never be incorporated into the Song administration. However in 1062 when Nùng Tông Ðán requested his territory be incorporated into the Song empire, Renzong accepted his request. According to The Draft Documents Pertaining to Song Official Matters, Nùng Tông Ðán was regarded by the Song as the prefect of Leihuo prefecture, renamed "Pacified Prefecture" (Shun'anzhou), and possessed the title "Personal Guardian General of the Right." Nùng Trí Hội (C. Nong Zhihui) the brother of Nùng Trí Cao, received the title "Personal Guardian of the Left." Other members of the Nùng clan in Temo such as Nùng Binh, Năng Lượng, and Nùng Hạ Khanh swore loyalty to the Song. Nùng Trí Cao's former generals Lư Báo, Lê Mạo, and Hoàng Trọng Khanh were also granted official titles.

In the view of the Song court, these titles were not merely honorary appointments. Local militia in the southwestern frontier zone was reorganized in 1065 under Guizhou prefect Lu Shen. The 45 grottoes along the You and Zuo rivers were assigned grotto militia leaders. A commissioner surveyed the region for able-bodied men to be organized under a guard commander selected from the area's prominent households, who received a specific signal banner to indicate their group's distinction. Groups of 30 men were organized into local governance units known as "tithings (jia)", which were organized in groups of five under a troop commandant (dutou), groups of ten led by an aboriginal commander (zhijunshi), and in groups of 50 led by a commander-in-chief (duzhijunshi). It was perhaps this intensification of border defense that the Viet court felt threatened by, as it saw its own systems of local control eroded.

Scholars also note that there was a sharp increase in the population of the Song dynasty's southwest frontier by the end of the 11th century. At the end of the 10th c., this region counted only 17,760 households while the same area had increased to 56,596 households in 1078-85. Guangnan West Circuit's population in 1080 stood at 287,723 households, a 133% increase from the Tang census of 742. Some of the increase can be attributed to including indigenous populations and improved recording methods, but the trend of increased Han Chinese settlement is clear. With the increase of Han Chinese population also came more northern-oriented cultural practices.

Before the Tang, this county was settled by the Miao barbarian people. There were no traces of Han settlers. In 1053, The ‘Great Martial Leader’ Di (Qing) put down the rebellion of the Quang Nguyên barbarian Nùng Trí Cao, the troops following the general’s expedition remained in the region to open up and settle the wasteland. Their settlements extended throughout this county.

— A Record of Fengshan County

=== Viet expansion ===
The Lý court was also in the process of consolidating its frontier. In 1059, efforts were made to take direct control of the frontier and its manpower. The northern frontier in the Zuo-You river region was divided into new administrative units: Ngự Long, Vũ Thắng, Long Dực, Thần Ðiện, Bổng Thánh, Bảo Thắng, Hùng Lược, and Vạn Tiệp. Each of these units was assigned an official. Militia units were established among local communities. Conscripts had the character "Army of the Son of Heaven" (tianzi jun) tattooed on their foreheads. This reflected a distinctly Southeast Asian way of controlling regional manpower.

=== Border conflicts ===
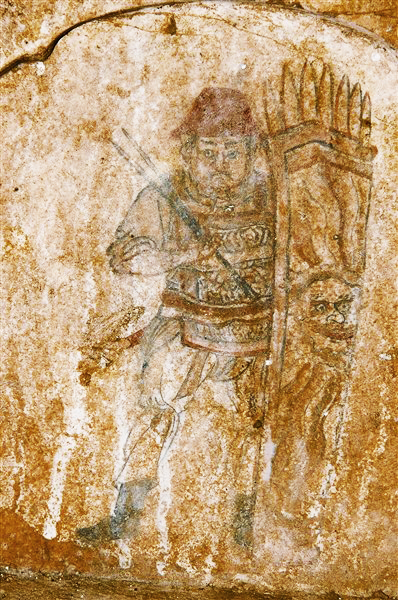
Song shieldbearer with fork

In the early 1060s border conflicts began to occur along the Song-Viet frontier. In the spring of 1060, the chieftain of Lạng Châu and imperial in-law, Thàn Thiệu Tháị, crossed into Song territory to raid for cattle. Thiệu Tháị captured the Song commander Yang Baocai in the attack. In autumn of 1060, Song forces also crossed the border but were unsuccessful in recovering Yang. Fighting caused by the natives led by Thiệu Tháị claimed the lives of five military inspectors. The military commissioner Yu Jing sought aid from Champa for a joint attack on Quảng Nguyên. The Lý court caught wind of this and began directly courting local leaders.

Despite increased military tensions, the Lý court sought to defuse the situation by sending a delegation led by Bi Gia Dụ to Yongzhou. The Song authorities requested the return of Yang Baocai but was denied. Emperor Renzong was also wary of further increasing tensions and instructed the local military commissions to refrain from assembling troops. On 8 February 1063, two tributary envoys from the Lý court presented to the Song emperor nine tame elephants. On 7 April 1063, the new Song emperor Yingzong (r. 1063-67) sent calligraphic compositions by Renzong as gifts to the Lý court.

On the same day the Viet envoy Lý Kế Tiên prepared to depart Kaifeng, news arrived that Thàn Thiệu Tháị had attacked settlements in Guangnan West Circuit. A Guangnan official requested immediate retaliation against the southern intruders. However the Song court tried to distance Thiệu Tháị's actions from the Lý court. An envoy from Thăng Long arrived seeking forgiveness for the attack. Yingzong decided not to retaliate.

On 18 November 1064, the Guizhou prefect Lu Shen reported that a military delegation from Thăng Long had crossed the border seeking Nùng Nhật Tân , the son of Nùng Tông Ðán. He also reported that the delegation showed interest in encroaching on Song territory, including Wenmen dong (Hurun, a village in Jingxi, Guangxi). The Song court took no particular action but Lu was determined to expand Song military presence in the south. Lu raised 44,500 troops from 45 aboriginal leaders along the Zuo-You River region and ordered them to repair and fortify military defenses. To gain the local trust, he requested special seals be made for his militia leaders and that the Zuo-You region be exempt from taxes. The Viet officials became concerned about this development and sent a tribute envoy to Kaifeng to remind the Song court of the Viet role in settling frontier matters. Meanwhile Lu proposed a special training and indoctrination program for a local chieftain each year that would see them enter the official bureaucracy after three years.

=== Shifting alliances ===
In late 1065, Nùng Tông Ðán switched allegiance from the Song and proposed an alliance with Lý Thánh Tông (r. 1054–1072) and Quảng Nguyên chieftain Lưu Ký (C. Liu Ji). Lu Shen reported this to court, but Yingzong did not take any action other than to reassign Nùng Tông Ðán's titles. To offset Tông Ðán's defection, the Song bestowed titles on Nùng Trí Hội and acknowledged him as the sole leader of Quảng Nguyên.

Emperor Shenzong of Song (r. 1067–1085) continued to pay special attention to Viet envoys in January and February 1067. He presented the envoys with a grand array of gifts: 200 liang of silver ingots, 300 bolts of silk, two horses, and a saddle with inlaid gold and silver plating. He called Lý Thánh Tông the "King of the Southern Pacified Region." At the same time Song officials on the southern frontier were training for military action. By late 1067, the Guizhou prefect Zhang Tian reported that Lưu Ký was in communication with Lư Báo, who had crossed into Song territory to seek personal glory. Zhang wished to attack Lư Báo but the Song court rejected this course of action. However by 1069, Lư Báo had offered his allegiance to the Song while Lưu Ký remained in Quảng Nguyên and was nominally under the control of Thăng Long.

In late 1071, the Guangnan military commissioner Xiao Gu reported that Lưu Ký had been spotted near Shun'anzhou (in Quảng Nguyên) at the head of more than 200 men. The Song court expressed concerns that forces were being amassed by barbarians.

On 2 February 1072, Lý Thánh Tông died. The new ruler, Lý Nhân Tông (r. 1072–1128), was only six years old. His regents, such as the defender-in-chief Lý Thường Kiệt, consolidated power by announcing a general amnesty for all outlaws in the protected prefectures. It was reported that the local chieftain of Lạng Châu, Dương Cảnh Thông, brought to court a white deer as tribute and was rewarded with the title "Grand Guardian."

In 1073, a group from the "Five Clans" sent a large tribute embassy numbering 890 to the Song court.

=== New Policies ===
In the late 1060s, Wang Anshi's New Policies and the prevalent sentiment of irredentism in Shenzong's court led to new ways of governing. Wang's policies saw each part of society as part of a greater whole, and thus the state must take a more holistic and all-encompassing part in governance. One of Wang's reforms, the Balanced Delivery Law, called on fiscal intendants in six of the southern circuits to disregard quotas on tribute items and to buy and sell items according to prices on the open market. Loyal supporters were sought out to assist in the extraction of these resources. Lý Thường Kiệt viewed the changing economic relationship between the Song and its frontier people as an abandonment of the traditional tribute paradigm. Wang called for military action from Song imperial troops.

In early 1075, Thăng Long requested the return of an upland chieftain who had gone over to the Song with 700 followers. The Song refused, saying that they had submitted to the Song.

In the spring of 1075, Shenzong sent two officials, Shen Qi and Liu Yi, to govern Guizhou. They were instructed to train the locals in riverine warfare and forbid them from trading with subjects of the Viet court. Thường Kiệt accused the Song of training soldiers for attacking Thăng Long. Some scholars have argued that Wang planned for a southward expansion of Song territory.

== Conflict ==
=== Viet invasion ===
Viet forces invaded into modern day Nanning (Yongzhou) in Guangxi, highlighted in dark blue

In 1075, the Quảng Nguyên chieftain Lưu Ký launched an attack on Yongzhou and was repulsed by Nùng Trí Hội.

Anticipating an attack from the north, Lý Thường Kiệt divided his army in two. The plan was for the first group, which included a strong contingent of uplanders and led by Nùng Tông Ðán, to invade and attract the attention of troops at Yongzhou. The second group, the main army, was a coastal force intended to capture undefended places. In October 1075, Nùng Tông Ðán led 23,000 soldiers along the Zuo River into Song territory and captured Guwan, Taiping, Yongping, and Qianlong garrisons. Meanwhile, the naval force of Thường Kiệt captured Qinzhou and Lianzhou. Thường Kiệt presented himself as a liberator in search of a rebel and sought to free the Chinese from Wang Anshi's oppressive reforms.

The two invading armies arrived at Yongzhou in the early spring of 1076. They defeated a militia force led by Zhang Shoujie, the governor-general of Guangnan West Circuit, who was beheaded at the battle of Kunlun Pass. The Viets then laid siege to Yongzhou. Su Jian, the Prefect of Yongzhou, took up arms and led the defense of the city. During the siege, Yongzhou residents suffered from severe food and water shortages. The city's well ran dry from drought and dysentery victims began piling up in the streets. Su Jian was unable to send for reinforcements and began posting impeachment documents throughout the streets in vain against Liu Yi (劉彝 1017-1086)–the Military Commissioner (jinglüe si 經略司) of Guizhou, who never came to relieve the besieged Yongzhou. In a naval engagement, Su Jian took hundreds of enemy heads. When the besiegers attempted to assault the city wall with scaling-towers, Su's men used flaming arrows to destroy enemy siege crafts, pushing back the attackers, killing over 15,000 enemy Viets and temporarily lifting the siege. However, when the Viets returned shortly after, they brought local Chinese civilians who helped them make clay-bag berms to scale the Yongzhou walls, and were able to enter the city.

After a 42 day siege, Yongzhou's defenses were breached on 1 March, and was taken in an assault. The 3,000 strong garrison was defeated and the city fortress razed to the ground. The city commander Su Jian killed his own family and refused to leave a burning building, committing suicide. Su Jian said "I won't die at the hands of those thieves." The Vietnamese killed as many as 58,000 Yongzhou residents, so many that the Viet army apportioned its bonuses in batches of a hundred heads. Several sources estimate that the total number of people killed by the Viet troops during this campaign totaled 80,000–100,000.

After seizing Yongzhou, the Viet army occupying the city planned to attack Guizhou next. Their scouts advanced for several miles and encountered a large Song army arriving from the north shouting: "Su Huangcheng (Su Jian's spirit) is leading troops to avenge the grievances against Jiaozhi!" Upon hearing the news, Thường Kiệt's forces retreated, taking with them a large amount of spoils and thousands of prisoners.

=== Song counterattack ===
Song forces reached Nhu Nguyệt River in Bắc Ninh Province (highlighted in red) near the capital of Thăng Long

Prior to the invasion of Song, Lý Thường Kiệt had fought a successful war against the Chams in 1069, so in 1076, the Song called upon the Khmer Empire and Champa to go to war against Đại Việt.

In late 1076, the Song commander Guo Kui (1022–1088) started gathering forces on the Viet border. It took him one month to reach the border and another two months to gather his forces. The assisting officer Zhao Xie was critical of the slow campaign. He believed that a vanguard force should have advanced directly through the mountains towards Thăng Long (modern Hanoi), but his opinion was ignored. Near the end of the year, they led the combined Song force of 50,000 soldiers and 100,000 supply carriers into Đại Việt territory. A contingent of cavalryman under Tao Bi (1015–1078) entered the Zuo River region. The Song quickly took Quảng Nguyên and in the process captured Lưu Lý, who had attacked Yongzhou in 1075. Lưu Ký deployed elephants against the Song forces, who used scythes to cut their trunks, causing them to trample their own troops. The dong settlements were razed.

By 1077, the Song had defeated forces from Cơ Lang and Quyết Lý and marched towards the Đại Việt capital at Thăng Long. Song forces convened at the Nhu Nguyệt River (in modern Bắc Ninh Province). Thường Kiệt regarded the defense of this river as crucial to the war effort because it presented the last chance to protect the delta region, where the tombs of former rulers and the village of the dynasty's founder were located. Thường Kiệt ordered his men to erect on the river's southern bank a large earthen rampart protected by lines of bamboo piles. Meanwhile his fleet crossed the mouth of the Bạch Đằng River to block Song naval forces from supporting action. There was also a "water barrier" that covered the Bạch Đằng estuary. No details of naval fighting survive except that "many sea battles" were fought starting months before any land battles occurred.

Zhao Xie ordered his soldiers to build catapults and floating bridges. The Song army gathered across the river from a hill where the Viets could not see them. Bombardment from the catapults cleared the river of Viet vessels, making way for the Song bridges. Several hundred Song soldiers managed to cross before the bridges were burnt. They set fire to the bamboo defense walls but there were too many layers to break through. A vanguard cavalry force rode within several kilometers of Thăng Long. As the Song forces took the offensive, the Viets strained to hold the front line. Lý Thường Kiệt tried to boost the morale of his soldiers by citing a poem before his army named "Nam quốc sơn hà". The poem so invigorated his forces that the Viets made a successful counterattack, pushing Song forces back across the river. Song forces tried to cross again but Thường Kiệt had previously built a defense system of spikes under the Như Nguyệt riverbed, and they were again pushed back, sustaining 1,000 casualties. Meanwhile the Song naval attack was held back by the Viet coastal defense and failed to provide any assistance to Guo Kui.

Guo Kui led the Song army in another direction towards the nearby region of Phú Lương, where they bombarded Thường Kiệt's positions. Thường Kiệt held out for a month, repulsing multiple attempts by Song forces to cross the river. He became overconfident and decided to make a frontal assault to disperse the Song army. He led his army under cover of night across the river and attacked the Song forces. As the Song front line was in danger of collapsing, reinforcements arrived and pushed back the Viet army back across the river. A Viet general was captured and two princes drowned in the fighting at Kháo Túc River.

According to Chinese sources, "tropical climate and rampant disease" severely weakened Song's military forces while the Viet court feared the result of a prolonged war so close to the capital. Song forces lost about 50%–60% before retreating, half of them dying to diseases. However Song forces continued to occupy the five disputed regions of Quảng Nguyên (renamed Shun'anzhou/Shunzhou or Thuận Châu), Tư Lang Châu, Môn Châu, Tô Mậu Châu, and Quảng Lăng. Viet forces also continued to occupy Yongzhou, Qinzhou, and Lianzhou.

== Peace agreement ==
As a result of mounting casualties on both sides, Lý Thường Kiệt made peace overtures to the Song in 1077; the Song commander Guo Kui agreed to withdraw his troops but kept the five disputed regions of Quảng Nguyên (renamed Shun'anzhou/Shunzhou or Thuận Châu), Tư Lang Châu, Môn Châu, Tô Mậu Châu, and Quảng Lăng. These areas now comprise most of modern Vietnam's Cao Bằng Province and Lạng Sơn Province. Đại Việt held control of Yongzhou, Qinzhou and Lianzhou.

Minor clashes continued to occur. In the spring of 1077, Song soldiers raided a holy temple and seized an Amitābha sculpture but abandoned it in the forest when they fled from a Viet ambush. The Buddha was thought to be lost until a fire during the dry season consumed that forest and villagers reported the miracle to the king, and he returned the Buddha statue to Phật Tích temple with great honors. In 1079 the Song arrested and executed the Nùng leader Nùng Trí Xuân (C. Nong Zhichun) while taking his family as hostages. In 1083, Viets attacked Guihua under the pretense of pursuing Nùng Trí Hội, the brother of Nùng Trí Cao. Trí Hội plead to the military commissioner Xiong Ben for fresh troops to ward of Viet advances, but was taken in for questioning instead.

In 1082, after a long period of mutual isolation, emperor Lý Nhân Tông of Đại Việt returned Yongzhou, Qinzhou, and Lianzhou back to Song authorities, along with prisoners of war, and in return Song relinquished its control of four prefectures and a county, including the Nùng clan's home of Quảng Nguyên, Bảo Lạc, and Susang. Further negotiations took place from July 6 to August 8, 1084 at Yongping garrison in southern Guangnan, where Đại Việt's Director of Military Personnel Lê Văn Thịnh (fl. 1038–1096) convinced Song to fix the two countries' borders between Quảng Nguyên and Guihua prefectures.

== Legacy ==
The war resulted in an agreement between both sides that fixed the two country's borders; the modern border is largely unmodified from the resulting line of demarcation.

=== Vietnam ===
==== Modern nationalism ====
Revolutionary Vietnamese scholars in the Democratic Republic of Vietnam have since 1954, almost without variance, depicted 11th century Vietnamese society as filled with Kinh (ethnic Vietnamese) and non-Kinh in a "United Front" against Chinese aggression. At the same time they depicted the subjects under Chinese rule as a multitudinous array of interests. Although such a conclusion can be easily drawn from existing sources, this interpretation is undoubtedly colored by nationalistic bias. Patriotic 20th c. Vietnamese scholars were interested in countering the French colonial conception of a regional and ethnically divided Vietnam, which the French used to explain how they conquered it so easily. According to Patricia Pelley, "to overcome this characterization, revolutionary writers were supposed to recite haranguing clichés about the essential unity and homogeneity of (Vietnam) and its indomitable spirit in the fight against foreign aggression."

One crucial expression of this was the seminal work of historian Hoàng Xuân Hãn (1908–96), Lý Thường Kiệt (1949), which attributed to the Lý dynasty a special ability to integrate uplands people and utilize them to advance Đại Việt's interests. In the book's conception, the Nùng clan was the local representative of the Lý court and the lands they occupied constituted sovereign Vietnamese territory. This was despite Nùng Tông Ðán approaching the Song dynasty and offering the settlements of Leihuo and Jicheng (both in Quảng Nguyên). According to this conception of Vietnamese territorial sovereignty, it was explained that because "the family of Tông Ðán still maintained control of his old territory", it was therefore still territory that belonged to Vietnam. Other Vietnamese historians emphasize the high position of Nùng Tông Ðán in the Lý army and his participation in the war against the Song dynasty. As a result, many scholars contend that the Lý leadership benefited more from their relationship with the uplanders than the Song.

One dissenting opinion is James A. Anderson, who argues that the opposite was true, and the Lý court felt threatened by the Song's increasing ties with Nong Zhigao's followers, and thus chose a preemptive attack as their best military option. Tuong Vu concurs with Anderson, but states that the idea of a preemptive Viet invasion is a nationalist narrative, when in fact Dai Viet had already challenged the Song in the border area previously. According to Vu, the Song was militarily weak and was forced to pay tribute to all three of its neighbors in the north, the Western Xia, Liao dynasty, and Jin dynasty. It posed no threat to Đại Việt, but the Lý monarchs saw in the Song an opportunity to expand their northern frontier to retake territory from tribes that had switched allegiance to the Song.

==== Vietnam's first Declaration of Independence ====
According to the 14th-century Buddhist scripture Thiền uyển tập anh, during the Viet defense against the Song counteroffensive in which Song forces nearly reached the Đại Việt capital of Thăng Long, general Lý Thường Kiệt wrote a famous poem named Nam quốc sơn hà. He recited the poem in front of his army in order to boost the morale of his men before the battle of Nhu Nguyệt River. The poem, dubbed retroactively as Vietnam's first Declaration of Independence asserted the sovereignty of Đại Việt rulers over its lands. The poem reads:

Literary Chinese	Sino-Vietnamese	Chữ Hán Nôm	Vietnamese translation	English translation
南國山河南帝居 截然定分在天書 如何逆虜來侵犯 汝等行看取敗虛	Nam quốc sơn hà nam đế cư Tiệt nhiên định phận tại thiên thư Như hà nghịch lỗ lai xâm phạm Nhữ đẳng hành khan thủ bại hư.	滝𡶀渃南𤤰南於 𤋶𤋶定分於冊𡗶 故吵𠎪弋𨖅侵犯 衆𣊾仕被打𧛷𢱎	Sông núi nước Nam, vua Nam ở Rành rành định phận ở sách trời. Cớ sao lũ giặc sang xâm phạm, Chúng bây sẽ bị đánh tơi bời.	Over Mountains and Rivers of the South, reigns the Emperor of the South; As it stands written forever in the Book of Heaven; How dare those barbarians invade our land? Your armies, without pity, will be annihilated.

According to K.W. Taylor, if the story of the poem is true, then the poem could not have been sung in the form it currently exists today. The poem is written in Classical Chinese following Tang-style rules that would have been hard to understand for Viet soldiers. It would also be the only literary work known to have been written by Lý Thường Kiệt, who was not a literary man. The story of singing in temples to boost military morale prior to battle is plausible, but whether or not it was this specific poem that was sung cannot be answered. It is possible that it was written after the event.

=== China ===
In China, the Siege of Yongzhou during the Vietnamese invasion was depicted in a Lianhuanhua book, which is a type of small palm-sized picture books containing sequential drawings developed in China during the early 20th century. The illustration on page 142, painted by Xiong Kong Cheng (熊孔成), describes the bravery of Su Jian, who, with only three thousand men was able to put up a fierce, forty-two day, resistance against Vietnamese forces before finally succumbing to vastly superior numbers.

=== Zhuang/Nùng ===
After the end of the war in 1078, the historical trends of the Tai-speaking Zhuang/Nùng diverged. The originally single ethnic group came to be known by different names in China and Vietnam. In China there was greater assimilation of the Zhuang into mainstream Han Chinese society while the Nùng in Vietnam remained fairly autonomous until the late modern period. As a result, the Nùng were more able to express an independent political ethnic identity through the worship of Nùng Trí Cao (C. Nong Zhigao). Many families with the Nong (V. Nùng) surname in Cao Bằng claim descent from Nong Zhigao and sponsor public displays of pride in the 11th century leader through temples and monuments. There is more evidence of the celebration of Nong Zhigao in Cao Bằng than in Guangxi, especially prior to the modern era, after which the local leader was inserted into nationalist histories as though he were a citizen of China or Vietnam.

There is little to no physical evidence of Nong Zhigao's commemoration in China before the 18th century. However in 1956, a stele dating to 1706 was discovered in Tiandeng County. It commemorated the construction of the Zhongxiu Dujun Village Temple and describes how Nong Dalingshen Dianxia (His Highness Nùng the Great Spirit) became a lord, fought valiantly, and transformed into a spirit to protect the region. The primary patrons of the temple were the Huang, Lin and Zhao clans. After the defeat of Nong Zhigao, the Nong clan was forced to take the surname Zhao. In September 1952, the People's Republic of China recognized the Zhuang as a national minority and established the Guangxi Zhuang Autonomous Region. Public events such as the springtime festival and song festival Sanyuesan were promoted by the government, but by the 1980s they had become more tourist attractions than a symbol of ethnic solidarity for the Zhuang. The promotion of Zhuang culture faced challenges in differing priorities between rural and urban Zhuang communities.

In the 1970s, Nong Zhigao was rehabilitated in the national consciousness. Huang Xianfan's Nong Zhigao portrayed him as a Chinese leader and after the Sino-Vietnamese War in 1979, Huang interpreted Nong Zhigao as a local leader who fought against a corrupt Song court that refused to provide locals with protection from marauding bands from Đại Việt. By the late 1980s, collections of folklore containing tales of Nong Zhigao's heroism had been published. On 8 January 1997, a group of Nong Zhigao's descendants in Jingxi erected a stele in honor of his birth. The Zhuang of Wenshan Zhuang and Miao Autonomous Prefecture identify as survivors of Nong Zhigao's rebel movement and other groups in Dali City, Xishuangbana, and northern Thailand claim to be descended from Nong Zhigao. Many Zhuang songs refer to him as "King Nong."

Unlike the Nùng in China, the Tai-speaking people in Đại Việt remained in a patron-client relationship with the Viet court. They lived in the mountainous areas of Việt Bắc and most of their interaction with Viets was through merchants who traded in return for tribute to the court. Assimilation with broader Viet society did not occur and the Viet court ruled the frontier region through the thổ ty, autonomous local rulers. Thổ ty officials held hereditary positions and were de facto rulers that wielded absolute authority in their own areas. They paid tribute to both Chinese and Viet authorities. As late as the 19th century, imperial assertion of authority by the Nguyễn dynasty over these areas was often met by violent local opposition. When the Viet Minh took the Việt Bắc region in 1953, most Nùng communities were still self ruled.

The French colonial Tonkin Protectorate saw the Nùng as potential converts to the colonial order. During the Cần Vương movement to restore Viet independence, the Nùng showed little interest in supporting the lowland Kinh Viets against the French. Some of the upland peoples supported the Black Flag Army who fought against the French, while others sided with the French. The Indochinese Communist Party suggested giving upland peoples and minorities full autonomy once the French colonial order was overthrown but gave little attention to them until 1941 when support from these communities became a strategic necessity. The Nùng assisted Ho Chi Minh in his activities. As a result of anti-French activities, temples of Nùng Trí Cao were destroyed. During the Vietnam War, Nùng villages in the Việt Bắc region avoided the devastation of other upland communities in the Central Highlands. The Democratic Republic of Vietnam supervised state-sponsored migration to upland areas but the north did not experience a massive influx of Kinh Viets, so the ethnic balance around the Nùng Trí Cao temples remained fairly consistent.

Nùng Trí Cao and his family members were deified as thổ ty by the Nùng. Worship of Nùng Trí Cao was widespread by the 19th century. In 1897, it was reported that local leaders had arranged the renovation of the Kỳ Sầm Temple in conjunction with the Nùng clan. On the tenth day of the first lunar month a festival was held around the temple. Another festival focused on trade was held around the temple in the third lunar month during Thanh Minh (Qingming Festival). After the Sino-Vietnamese War, support for Nùng Trí Cao could be read as anti-Chinese, as he was mainly seen as a rebel against Chinese authority. The keepers of the Kỳ Sầm Temple all bear the surname Nùng. Although a romanized script has been created for the Nùng language, worshipers of the temple prefer Chinese, similar to the Zhuang in China, and sometimes Vietnamese. The Kỳ Sầm Temple was renovated sometime prior to 2001 to portray a more nationalistic image. The exterior and interior pillars of the temple have been retouched and the Chinese-character inscriptions at the front and Quốc ngữ inscriptions on the walls have been removed. References to "King Nùng" who had "raised high the banner proclaiming independence" have been replaced with floral patterns and pictures of horses, generic symbols associated with local heroes. A large sign indicates the temple as a historical landmark.
