= Nam quốc sơn hà =

10th-century Vietnamese poem

- Vietnamese alphabet: Nam quốc sơn hà
- Chữ Hán: 南國山河

Recitation of Nam quốc sơn hà - 1076 version

Nam quốc sơn hà (chữ Hán: 南國山河, lit. 'Mountains and Rivers of the Southern Country') is a famous 10th- to 11th-century Vietnamese patriotic poem. Dubbed "Vietnam's first Declaration of Independence", it asserts the sovereignty of Vietnam's rulers over its lands. The poem was first dictated to be read aloud before and during battles to boost army morale and nationalism when Vietnam, under Lê Đại Hành, fought against the Song dynasty's invasion in 981 and later, under Lý Thánh Tông and Lý Thường Kiệt, fought against another Song invasion in 1075–1076. The poem would become became an emblematic hymn in the early independence wars. The poem is one of the best-known pieces of Vietnamese literature.

The poem's exact authorship, origin, and style of writing are still controversial. According to K.W. Taylor, the account of the poem comes from the 14th-century Buddhist scripture Thiền uyển tập anh and if the story of the poem is true, then the poem could not have been sung in the form it currently exists today. The poem is written in Classical Chinese in the form of an oracle following Tang-style rules that would have been unintelligible for Viet soldiers. It would also be the only literary work known to have been written by Lý Thường Kiệt, who was not a literary man. The story of singing in temples to boost military morale prior to battle is plausible, but whether or not it was this specific poem that was sung cannot be answered. It is possible that it was written after the event.

== 981 version ==
Lĩnh Nam chích quái ("Selection of Strange Tales from Lingnan") dates this version to the Song–Đại Cồ Việt war:

南 國 山 河 南 帝 居
Nam quốc sơn hà Nam đế cư,
The Southern Country's mountains and rivers, the Southern Emperor inhabits.

皇 天 已 定 在 天 書
Hoàng thiên dĩ định tại thiên thư.
The August Heaven hath willed it so in the Heavenly Book.

如 何 北 虜 來 侵 掠
Như hà Bắc lỗ lai xâm lược,
How dare [you] Northern barbarians come to invade?

白 刃 翻 成 破 竹 餘
Bạch nhận phiên thành phá trúc dư.
The white blades will turn you into broken bamboo chips!

== 1076 version ==
Đại Việt sử ký toàn thư ("Complete Historical Annals of Great Viet") dates this version to the Song–Đại Việt war:

Chữ Hán	Sino-Vietnamese	Vietnamese translation (Note: attributed to either Trần Trọng Kim or Hoàng Xuân Hãn)	English Literal Translation	English Poetic Translation
南國山河南帝居 截然定分在天書 如何逆虜來侵犯 汝等行看取敗虛	Nam quốc sơn hà nam đế cư Tiệt nhiên định phận tại thiên thư Như hà nghịch lỗ lai xâm phạm Nhữ đẳng hành khan thủ bại hư.	Sông núi nước Nam, vua Nam ở, Rành rành định phận ở sách trời. Cớ sao lũ giặc sang xâm phạm, Chúng bây sẽ bị đánh tơi bời.	The Southern country's [quoc] mountains and rivers the Southern Emperor inhabits. The separation is natural and allotted in Heaven's Book. If the bandits come to trespass it, You shall, in doing that, see yourselves to be handed with failure and shame!	O'er the hills and streams of southern clime [a] southern monarch reigns; His sov'reign state On bamboo slip engraved by Time [t]he writ of Heav'n ordains Dare you, 'gainst Fate [t]hrust in, his turbulence to quell? Beware! - For you will sound the knell.

== Popular culture ==
The poem Nam quốc sơn hà has continued to inspire various works of Vietnamese culture and art. Its central line declaring Vietnamese sovereignty has been referenced in modern literature, music, and popular media. Several patriotic songs have adapted or echoed the phrase "Nam quốc sơn hà Nam đế cư" to emphasize national identity and resilience.

== See also ==
- Song–Đại Cồ Việt war
- Song–Đại Việt War
- Vietnamese Declarations of Independence
- Hịch tướng sĩ, a 13th-century hymn by Trần Hưng Đạo while fighting against the Mongol invasions.
