= Lý Thường Kiệt =

Vietnamese general (1019–1105)

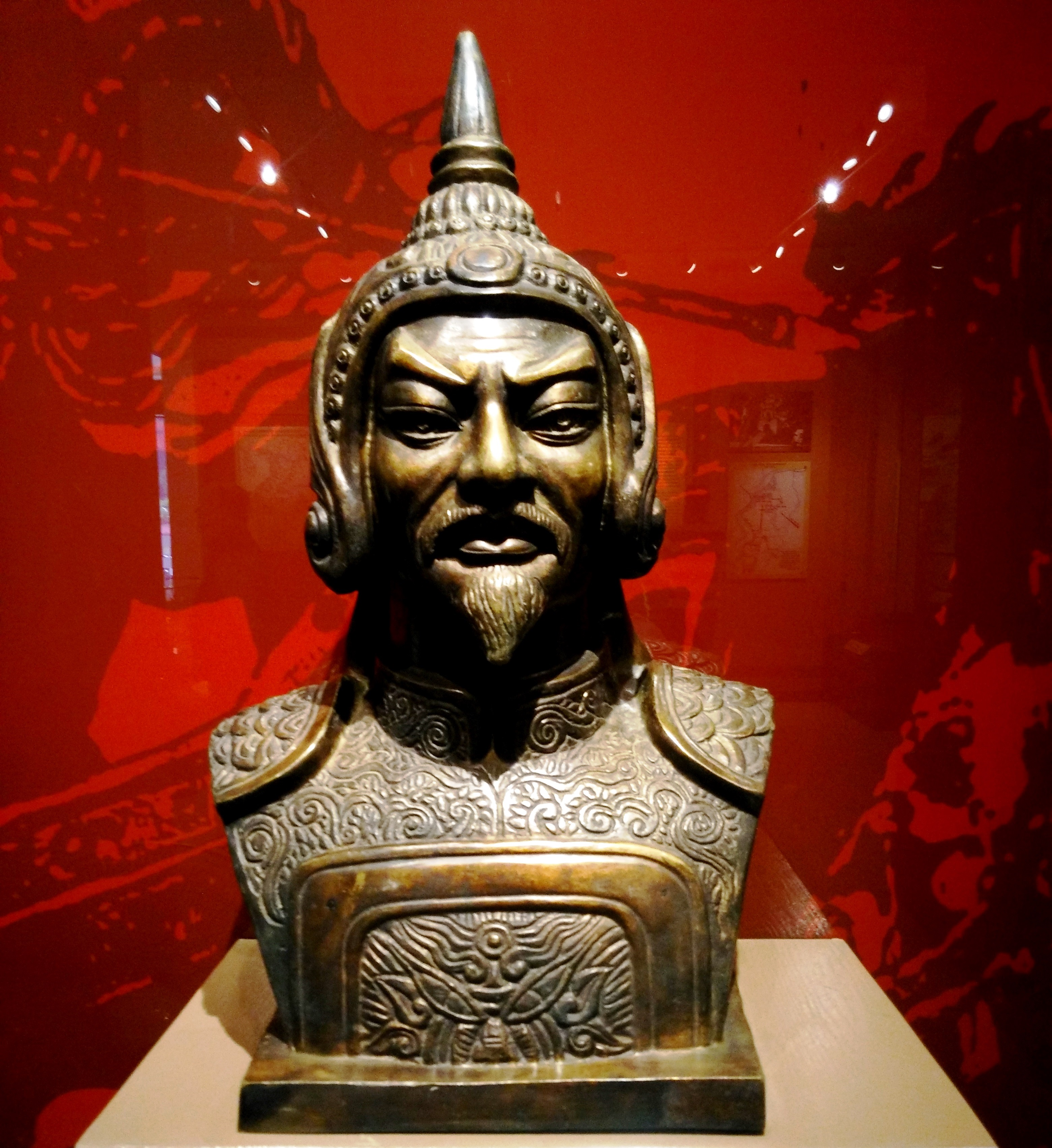
Bust of Lý Thường Kiệt

Lý Thường Kiệt (李常傑; 1019–1105), originally Ngô Tuấn (吳俊), was a Vietnamese general and eunuch of the Lý dynasty. He served as an official through the reign of Lý Thái Tông, Lý Thánh Tông and Lý Nhân Tông and was a general during the Song–Lý War.

In Vietnamese history, he helped invade Champa (1069), raid the three Song dynasty provinces of Yongzhou, Qinzhou, Lianzhou (1075–1076), and defeat the Song invasion of Vietnam led by Gou Kui and Zhao Xie.

== Background ==
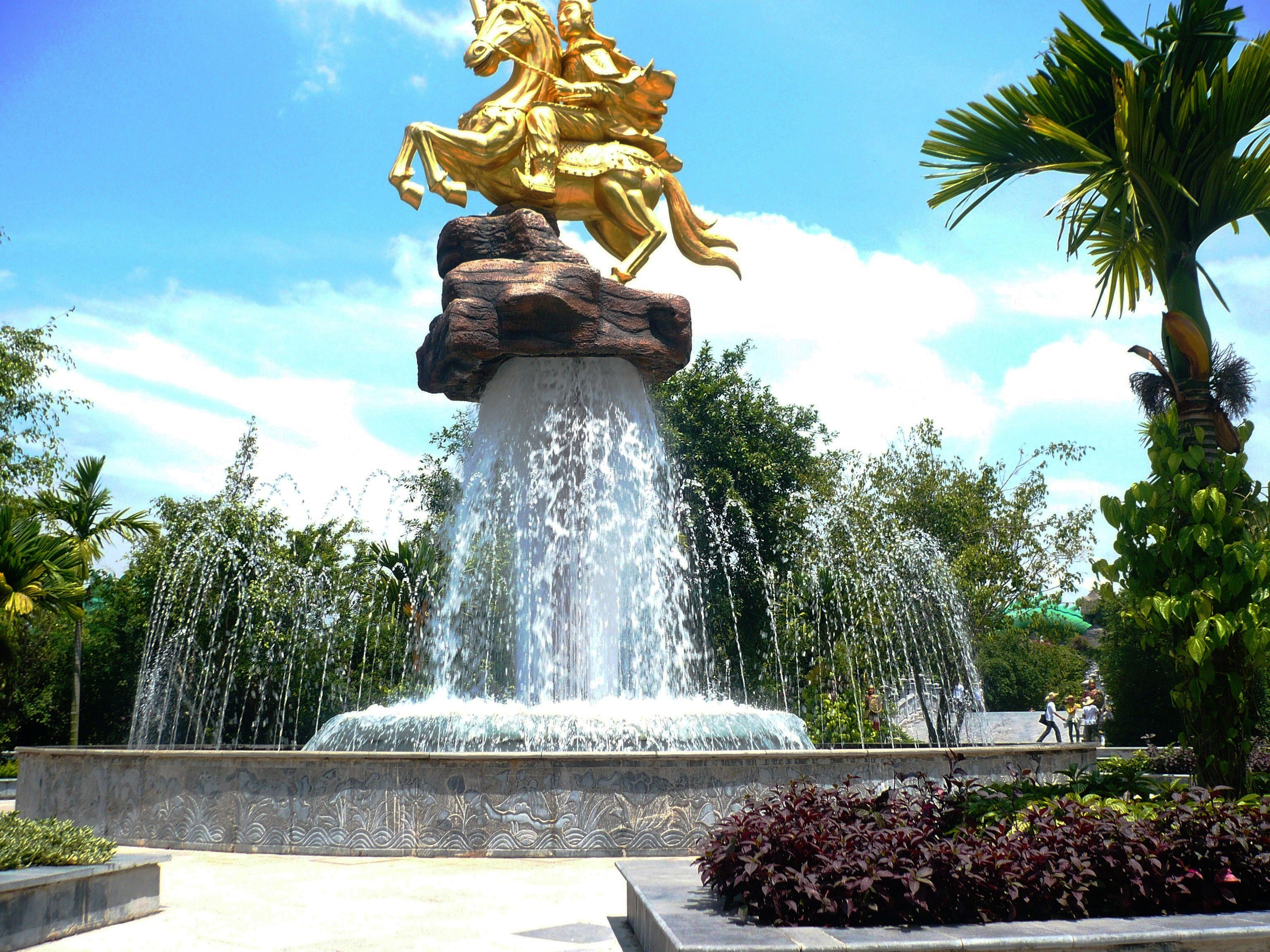
Lý Thường Kiệt statue at Đại Nam Văn Hiến

=== Born Ngô Tuấn ===
Lý Thường Kiệt was born in Thăng Long (now Hanoi), the capital of Đại Việt (ancient Vietnam). His real name was Ngô Tuấn. His father was a low-ranking military officer. He was originally from Thái Hòa ward (太和坊) of Thăng Long citadel. According to Hoàng Xuân Hãn, Thái Hòa was also the name of a small mountain in the west of Thăng Long citadel, south of the Bách Thảo dike, near the place turn down to the horse racing. Lý Thường Kiệt surname was not originally Lý, because he was given the royal surname. As for his original surname, there are now two major controversial theories:

- Ngô surname: This theory is based on "Genealogy of the Vietnamese Ngô family" and "Thần phổ Lý Thường Kiệt" written by Nhữ Bá Sĩ in the Nguyễn dynasty. According to this evidence, his original name was Ngô Tuấn (吳俊), the name after maturity was Thường Kiệt (常傑), after being given the royal surname, was named Lý Thường Kiệt. He was the son of Sùng Tiết general Ngô An Ngữ, the grandson of ambassador Ngô Xương Xí and the great-grandson of Thiên Sách vương Ngô Xương Ngập - the eldest son of Ngô Quyền. This theory was most widely accepted, but it was considered a "new theory", because the time of the evidence was still young, an unknown genealogy and was written during the Nguyễn dynasty.
- Quách surname: This theory is based on the stele "An Hoạch Báo Ân tự bi ký" (created in 1100) and the "Cồ Việt quốc Thái úy Lý công thạch bi minh tính tự" (created in 1159), these are both original steles of the Lý dynasty and the translation is available in "The epitaphs of Lý-Trần Dynasty" by Lam Giang, Pham Van Tham and Pham Thi Hoa. According to the information of both steles, Lý Thường Kiệt originally surname was Quách, first name was Tuấn, the name after maturity was Thường Kiệt very similar to the information of [Ngô family theory]. According to the stele, his hometown is An Xá village, Quảng Đức district (Cơ Xá, Gia Lâm district today), and perhaps later transformed into Thái Hòa ward as Toan Thu noted. His father was commander-in-chief under the reign of Lý Thái Tông, there are two different names, according to Đại Việt sử lược his father named commander-in-chief Quách Thịnh Ích (郭盛謚), and An Nam Chí Lược written as commander-in-chief Quách Thịnh Dật (郭盛溢), hometown in Câu Lậu and Tế Giang districts (now in Mỹ Văn, Hưng Yên). After the Emperor gave him the royal surname, Quách Tuấn was named Lý Thường Kiệt. According to the epitaph of commander-in-chief Đỗ Anh Vũ, Anh Vũ's father called Lý Thường Kiệt his uncle.

Chinese histories often say that [Thường Kiệt] is Lý Thường Cát or Lý Thượng Cát. In the family, he has a younger brother named Lý Thường Hiến (李常憲). Perhaps like his brother, "Thường Hiến" is the name after maturity, not the real name; it is customary in the old days that the name after maturation has a similar or opposite meaning to the real name and is used to call outside as an understanding of the politeness, only in the home to call the real name.

=== Family ===
According to the comment of Đại Việt sử ký toàn thư history book, his family succeeded as mandarins in the way of hereditary, that is the ordination was permanent throughout the generations, so his family could be seen as a bureaucracy with a strong roots. From a young age, Lý Thường Kiệt has proved to be a person with the will and energy, studying, practicing both literature and martial arts, having studied military tactics.

Due to two different sources, Lý Thường Kiệt's father position is also different. The Việt điện u linh tập history book that were compiled with [Ngô surname sources] all mention Lý Thường Kiệt's father named An Ngữ, and was a "Sùng ban Lang tướng". The An Nam chí lược history book in the Lý dynasty has two names Sùng ban and Lang tướng, but that policy copies the two names apart. Perhaps "Sùng ban Lang tướng" is "Lang tướng belonging to Sùng ban", because even in Chí lược book there was a position called "Vũ nội Lang tướng", but it is not clear how these positions are in the court. As for [Quách surname sources], Lý Thường Kiệt was the son of Quách Thịnh Ích, a commander-in-chief, so his position was different.

Nhữ Bá Sĩ wrote about the legend youth of Lý Thường Kiệt as follows:

"Around the date of Thiên Thành, during Lý Thái Tông's life, his father patrolled the border, in Tượng Châu of Thanh Hóa, became ill and died in 1031. Thường Kiệt was thirteen years old, day and night he couldn't stop crying. His aunt's husband, Tạ Đức saw it, feel sorry and soothe him. Tạ Đức asked him about his minded, he answered: "For literature, understand letters to sign is enough. And for martial arts, I want to follow Vệ Thanh and Hoắc Khú, traveled thousands of miles to make merits, gain seals, so my parents can be proud of me. That is my wishes." Tạ Đức praised him for his character, he let Thường Kiệt married his nephew named Thuần Khanh, and taught him about the infantry tactics in the military books of Tôn and Ngô family.

Thường Kiệt studied all night and day, read at night, daytime he training for archery, equestrian, strategic thinking. Understand all military tactics. Tạ Đức recommended him to read confucianism books, Thường Kiệt studied very hard for it, so he quickly become talented.

When he was 18 years old (1036), his mother died. He and his younger brother took care of all the funeral. While the sacrifice ceremony, whenever there is any work, he would did it by himself. At the end of the funeral, thanks to his adoptive father, Thường Kiệt was assigned the position of "Cavalry Captain", a small officer in the riding horses army."

— Excerpt from Nhữ Bá Sĩ, translation from the book "Lý Thường Kiệt" by Hoàng Xuân Hãn

Scholar Hoàng Xuân Hãn, when extracting content from Nhữ Bá Sĩ's stele, also commented: "This paragraph, copied from Nhữ Bá Sĩ stele, a new stele built in Tự Đức's reign. Certainly, Nhữ Bá Sĩ copied the oral tradition of the people. The word of the people is mostly an oral or a fabrication, we cannot fully believe the details that are so clearly written in the oral. But the above mentioned Thường Kiệt education is consistent with what we still know about the Lý dynasty."

== Nam Quốc Sơn Hà ==
He may have been the author of the Vietnamese poem Nam Quốc Sơn Hà. However controversy surrounds its exact authorship.

The poem was written to motivate troops to fight against the Song dynasty.

According to the 20th-century historian Trần Trọng Kim, Ly was afraid that his soldiers would lose morale, so he wrote this poem and said it was done by the Gods to restore their fighting spirit.

In US president Barack Obama's visit to Vietnam, he referred to the poem as Vietnam's "declaration of independence" saying that large countries should not bully smaller countries.

Nonetheless, to this day the poem is still well known in Vietnam, and Ly is considered a national hero, with some Vietnamese still delivering tribute to and worshipping him as a deity at his shrine in Hanoi.

Original Chinese	Sino-Vietnamese	English translation
南國山河南帝居 截然定分在天書 如何逆虜來侵犯 汝等行看取敗虛	Nam quốc sơn hà nam đế cư Tiệt nhiên định phận tại thiên thư Như hà nghịch lỗ lai xâm phạm Nhữ đẳng hành khan thủ bại hư.	Over Mountains and Rivers of the South, reigns the Emperor of the South; As it stands written forever in the Book of Heaven; How dare those barbarians invade our land? Your armies, without pity, will be annihilated.

== Phạt Tống lộ bố văn ==
General Ly Thuong Kiet was also the author of the Phạt Tống lộ bố văn (chữ Hán: 伐宋露布文, An Account of the Campaign to Punish the Song), another poem against the Song dynasty.
