= Hiển Khánh Vương =

Father of Vietnamese emperor Ly Thai To with unknown background.

- Born: prior to 970 unknown
- Died: after 1000; Unknown (Early Lê dynasty?)
- Spouse(s): Phạm Thị, Empress Dowager Minh Đức (明德太后范氏)
- Children: Prince Vũ Uy (武威王); Lý Công Uẩn; Prince Dực Thánh (聖翊王)

Hiển Khánh Vương (chữ Hán: 顯慶王 "Duke of Hiển Khánh") was the father of Lý Thái Tổ. Very little is known about him, as not much was recorded about him historically; even his real name remains unknown and controversial.

While the Vietnamese historical accounts portray of him as a demigod, several hypotheses have been proposed regarding his identity. These range from theory that he was Patriarch Vạn Hạnh, or a native Jiaozhi descended from one among the 12 warlords to the theory that he was a descendant of the Li clan of Min during the Five Dynasties period.

== Vietnamese sources ==
The paternal lineage of Lý Thái Tổ was not prominently recorded in Vietnamese official history. The Vietnamese annuals Việt sử lược and Đại Việt sử ký tiền biên only record Công Uẩn's mother as having the surname Phạm, and do not mention his father, suggesting that he was a fatherless child. Đại Việt sử ký toàn thư and Khâm định Việt sử Thông giám cương mục record that when Công Uẩn's mother went sightseeing at Tiêu Sơn temple, she copulated with a demigod or a Taoist immortal, and later gave birth to Công Uẩn. Researcher Trần Viết Điền argued that the conclusion that Lý Công Uẩn was the son of a demigod satisfied the expectation of people throughout the realm at the time to be ruled by the Son of Heaven, his view is supported by many people; while historian professor Hoàng Xuân Hãn argued that this conclusion was intended to cover up the emperor's unfavorable origins. Furthermore, Đại Việt sử ký tiền biên quotes another record stating that Lý Công Uẩn's mother became pregnant after being touched by an old monk at Ứng Thiên pagoda: "According to folklore, when the king's mother was 20 year old, she was poor and unmarried. She worked as a cook and steamed sticky rice every night for an old monk at Ứng Thiên pagoda. One night, she overslept when the stove went out. The monk accidentally touched her which woke her up and made her feel uneasy. She later became pregnant and was expelled by the monk. She then went to another pagoda and gave birth to the king."

Although historical sources differ about the origin of Công Uẩn's father, Hiển Khánh Vương, they all record that at the age of 3, Mrs. Phạm brought Công Uẩn to Cổ Pháp Pagoda, where he was raised by Lý Khánh Văn (李慶文). Khánh Văn, the head monk of the pagoda, adopted him and named him Lý Công Uẩn.

During the Nguyễn dynasty, Nam Hải dị nhân of Phan Kế Bính records a folklore stating that Lý Công Uẩn's father died after falling into a well, and that his tomb was later built up by termites. However, this story appears to be a distorted version of a folklore that originated during the Later Lê dynasty. There is also a folk hypothesis that Lý Công Uẩn is Patriarch Vạn Hạnh's son, however that hypothesis is dismissed by historians who argue that the Buddhist in Vạn Hạnh's hometown Siêu Loại – Cổ Pháp would not have paid homage to a violated monastic precepts monk like this.

In 1009, after Lý Công Uẩn became emperor, he granted his father the title Hiển Khánh vương (顯慶王) posthumously, Minh Đức Empress Dowager for his mother, Duke of Vũ Đạo for his uncle, Duke of Vũ Uy for his older brother, Duke of Dực Thánh for his younger brother. Until 1018, he posthumously granted his grandmother the title Empress. Based on these two records, Ngô Thì Sĩ concluded that the grandmother who received the posthumous title was Công Uẩn's maternal grandmother (the mother of Mrs Phạm), not his paternal grandmother. This suggests that Lý Công Uẩn had no known paternal relatives. From this, Hiển Khánh vương may have been a nonexistent figure, or he may have been Lý Khánh Văn; however both hypotheses go against the feudal moral codes. Cương mục also leaves open the possibility that Hiển Khánh vương was Lý Khánh Văn, but it does not reach a conclusion. Cương mục also raises question of why, although Lý Thái Tổ granted titles for his brothers and uncle, historians during that time didn't record his father's full name. It also questions whether Hiển Khánh Vương was Thái Tổ's biological father, stepfather or godfather.

In Đại Việt sử ký, Lê Văn Hưu criticized the fact that Lý Thái Tổ posthumously honored his father only with the title of prince, rather than an imperial title. This is quoted in Đại Việt sử ký toàn thư: "The Zhou when founding the empire posthumously granted the titles of Great King (太王) and Prince Ji (王季) for Gugong Danfu and Jili. Likewise, after ascending the throne, emperor Taizu of Song when became emperor posthumously granted the titles of Emperor Xizu of Song (宋僖祖) and Emperor Yizu (翼祖) for his great-grandfather Zhao Tiao and his father Zhao Hongyin, reflecting the idea that fathers are honored because of their sons’ achievements. In contrast, after ascending the throne, our emperor Lý Thái Tổ posthumously granted his father only the title Duke of Hiển Khánh. His mandarins don't even correct him on that. Such an act reflected an inferiority complex."

Based on several historical records related to the locality of Hiển Khánh (located between the Đáy river and the Red river in Vụ Bản district, present day Nam Định), as well as accounts in Đại Nam nhất thống chí regarding the Temple of Lý Nhân Tông (built upon the Ứng Phong temporary royal palace) in Hiển Khánh, associate professor Nguyễn Hải Kế leaves open the possibility that Hiển Khánh may have been either the hometown or the workplace of Lý Công Uẩn's father, or even of Lý Công Uẩn himself, before he entered military service under the Hoa Lư royal court. Regarding Lý Công Uẩn's birthplace, essayist Trần Siêu concluded that the emperor didn't want to reveal his exact birthplace in Cổ Pháp district, so he renamed Cổ Pháp into Thiên Đức Prefecture.

In the article series The secret of king Lý Thái Tổ (Vietnamese: Những bí ẩn về vua Lý Thái Tổ) published in Education & Times newspaper (báo Giáo dục & Thời đại), author Trần Siêu concluded that Lý Công Uẩn is the descendant of the warlord Lý Khuê during the Ngô dynasty. According to his analysis, when Lý Khuê was defeated by Đinh Bộ Lĩnh and his children had to go into hiding to avoid capture from the Đinh - Lê royal court, Patriarch Vạn Hạnh helped a son of Lý Khuê marry Mrs Phạm to give birth to Lý Công Uẩn. That son of Lý Khuê is Hiển Khánh Vương.

== Chinese sources ==
Many Chinese historical records state that Lý Thái Tổ was of Min ancestry, which originated in present-day Fujian. Those records include: Sushui Jiwen of Sima Guang (Northern Song), Dream Pool Essays of Shen Kuo (Northern Song), Xu Zizhi Tongjian Changbian of Li Tao (Sourthen Song), Trịnh Thiều Châu kỷ lược phụ lục of Trịnh Tủng (the late Song and early Yuan), Wenxian Tongkao of Ma Duanlin (Yuan), Trịnh Khai Dương tạp trứ of Trịnh Nhược Tăng (Ming), Dushi Fangyu Jiyao of Gu Zuyu (Qing), Miscellaneous Records of Tây Sơn (西山雜志) of Cài Yǒngjiān (蔡永蒹, Qing). Some modern researchers agree with that statement. In the article “Documents on the Ancestral Origin of Lý Công Uẩn”, researcher Nguyễn Phúc Anh argues that the sources claiming Lý Công Uẩn was of Min ancestry are consistent, in contrast to the inconsistent information found in historical records asserting that Lý Công Uẩn was a native of Jiaozhou (including both Chinese and Vietnamese historical sources). However, Nguyễn Phúc Anh also discovered that all the previously mentioned Chinese historical sources were based on the letter sent by Xu Boxiang (徐伯祥) to emperor Lý Nhân Tông, which was regarded as a justification for the conquest of the Song's Qinzhou, Lianzhou, and Yongzhou. This letter was reported to Sima Guang by Guo Kui (郭逵). A quote from that letter: "Your predecessor was from Min. I heard that many senior mandarins in Jiaozhou are also from Min."

In the research work Lý Thường Kiệt - Lịch sử ngoại giao và tông giáo triều Lý (Lý Thường Kiệt – Diplomatic and Religious History of the Lý Dynasty), professor Hoàng Xuân Hãn argued that the Lý clan may have had Min ancestry, suggesting that they possibly took refuge in Jiaozhou when the Song conquered Min at the end of the Five Dynasties period. Since the letter of Xu Boxiang mentioned many people bearing the Lý surname, including numerous mandarins, relocated in the Jiaozhou during the Northern domination period, Nguyễn Hải Kế argued that this letter should be regarded only as a suggestion, rather than direct evidence for the Min ancestry of the Lý clan. In the article Tin đồn về Đại Việt trên đất Tống qua các nguồn sử liệu (Rumours about Đại Việt in the Song through historical records), based on Quế Hải ngu hành chí, Dr. Phạm Lê Huy argues that the "Min ancestry" rumours emerged in a context where there was a large population of immigrants from Fujian to Jiaozhou, and many of whom are highly valued by the Lý royal court. From this, it may also be inferred that the Lý royal court itself was, whether directly or indirectly, the source of those rumours. In the article “Documents on the Ancestral Origin of Lý Công Uẩn”, researcher Nguyễn Phúc Anh also discusses the hypothesis that Lý Công Uẩn's father was originally from Min. He argues that when Song annexed Min in 971, only a few years before Công Uẩn's birth in 974, the Lý clan had already taken refuge in Jiaozhou. Later, when ascending to the throne, as not wanting everyone to know his ancestor was from the Min, and also hoping to strengthen popular support, Lý Công Uẩn made up the story that he was a son of a demigod.

There are 2 Chinese historical sources stated that Lý Công Uẩn originated from Jiaozi, which is consistent with the Vietnamese ones. The first is An Nam Chí Lược of Lê Tắc, the Trần dynasty-born Yuan historian, stated that "Some people said that he [Lý Công Uẩn] is of Fujian origin; this is incorrect." Thus, Lê Tắc confirms that Lý Công Uẩn was of Jiaozi origin, but provides no further explanation. Summary of the Record of An Nam (Chinese: 安南志紀要; pinyin: An Nam zhi jiyao) by Gāo Xióngzhēng (高熊徵), a historian who lived during the transition from the late Ming to the early Qing dynasty, records material found in the Đại Việt Sử ký toàn thư, stated that Lý Công Uẩn was from Cổ Pháp, Bắc Giang. Some researchers argue that Lý Công Uẩn was a descendant of Li Ming, Prince Gong of Cao (曹恭王 李明), the son of Emperor Taizong and Cháo Là Wángfēi Yáng Shì (巢剌王妃楊氏), a member of the Yang clan of Hongnong.

=== Genealogy research ===
The Min ancestry of the Li clan were a controversial topic in China during the 1980s. In 2002, in the magazine Historical Research on the Chinese and Overseas Chinese, researcher Lǐ Tiānxī published his discovery of a genealogy book titled Genealogy of the Li Branch of the Li Clan in Li Zhuang (李庄𤆬内李氏房谱), shorten as Li Clan Genealogy. This genealogy book was published in 1266 during the Southern Song period, officially revised in 1564 during the Ming dynasty and revised again at an unknown date during the Guangxu's era. According to this book, Lý Công Uẩn was not only of the Min ancestry but was also born in Fujian. This discovery was soon supported by multiple Chinese researchers. In 2008, Chinese-Vietnamese historian Li Taishan (李泰山) discovered a record in the genealogy of the Li clan of Anhai which showed that the father of Lý Công Uẩn was Li Chun'an (Chinese: 李淳安; pinyin: Lǐ Chún'ān, Vietnamese: Lý Thuần An, 9 October 921 – 29 November 999).

According to Li Clan Genealogy, Li Chun'an was the first of two sons of Li Song. After Li Song was falsely accused and executed in 948 during the Later Han dynasty, Li Chun'an escaped to Quanzhou which was then controlled by the warlord Liu Congxiao (but nominally under the control of the Southern Tang dynasty). He resettled in the Li Family village in Anhai, Quanzhou and became a Water mid Land Transport Commissioner (水陸轉運使) at some point. Some time later, he deserted his official post to escape from an unspecified danger, and traveled by South China Sea to Jiaozhi (now Vietnam), Champa and Khmer Empire for business, spending the most time in Jiaozhi. He fathered several children, including Lý Công Uẩn whose courtesy name was Zhaoyan. According to this same source, Lý Công Uẩn followed his father to Bắc Giang and later become the founding emperor of the Lý dynasty. Those sources don't mention whether Li Chun'an's wife was Phạm Thị Ngà, nor do they state whether she gave birth to Lý Công Uẩn in Fujian, or Jiaozhi.

Lǐ Tiānxī identified many similarities between the contents of the Li Clan Genealogy and those of the Historical Records of the Five Dynasties and History of Song, noting that some parts of the genealogy were copied verbatim, word for word, from the History of Song. This proves that the Li Clan Genealogy couldn't be compiled independently of these historical sources. Given the limited circulation of genealogy books and the difficulties of transportation, it seems unlikely that the History of Yuan would have traveled from Dadu (Beijing) to Fujian merely to consult this genealogy book. Thus, the Li Clan Genealogy could only have been compiled by consulting official historical sources, and might even have drawn on Vietnamese sources. However, Lǐ Tiānxī dismissed the similarities between the Li Clan Genealogy and those historical sources, stating "[That similarities] reflects the careful tradition in genealogical compilation and the deep respect of ones's ancestor." Nguyễn Phúc Anh concluded that Lǐ Tiānxī was biased by this idea and used it to justify the verbatim copying.

The accuracy of the Li Clan Genealogy was strongly suspected by Vietnamese historians, and was even rejected by some. Essayist Nguyễn Ngọc Phúc in Thư tịch, truyền thuyết, di tích về quê hương, gia đình của Lý Công Uẩn (Records, legends, and relics of Lý Công Uẩn's Hometown and Family) raised questions about the genealogy when comparing it with the Historical Records of the Five Dynasties. According to the Biography of Li Song in this Five Dynasty records, Li Song had three familial exterminations and there is no record of either of his two sons escaping. This genealogy book also contains significant contradiction with official Vietnamese historical records. Through textual analysis, Nguyễn Phúc Anh pointed out that the content related to Lý Công Uẩn could only be added sometime between 1564 and the early 19th century. Li Clan Genealogy also directly influenced Cài Yǒngjiān when compiling Miscellaneous Records of Tây Sơn. Miscellaneous Records of Tây Sơn also contains a similar account of Lý Công Uẩn’s father: "In the first year of the Kāiyùn era of the Later Jin, Nán Táng planned to conquer the Min. Chancellor Li Song opposed the proposal. Li Song based in the left side of Wushan. He sailed south across the sea and took refuge here. His son, Li Fuan, whose courtesy name was Shanping, abandoned his studies and took up commerce. He traveled by sea to Chenla, Champa, and countries in the Gulf of Siam. He was particularly familiar with Annam and Jiaozhi. Whenever he made a voyage by boat, all the villagers accompanied him.His youngest son is Lý Công Uẩn, who become king during the Northern Song, and went on to establish the nine-generation royal dynasty of Annam."

== Conclusion ==
Among the Vietnamese and Chinese historical sources containing accounts of Lý Công Uẩn, only Dream Pool Essays and Sushui Jiwen are compiled during the Song and Lý dynasties, especially during the Song - Lý war in 1075 - 1077 which took place nearly 50 years after Lý Công Uẩn's death. According to Nguyễn Phúc Anh, the credibility of those historical sources rests on Sima Guang, a renowned scholar, and also a senior court official with considerable influence across East Asia. Sima Guang was also a witness to the Song–Lý War of 1075–1077 and worked with the generals and court officials involved in the conflict. Therefore, his records concerning the Lý clan cannot be arbitrarily dismissed. However, Sima Guang’s account was based on Guo Kui’s direct testimony, rather than on Sima Guang’s own firsthand observations or independent investigation. Regarding the Li Clan Genealogy, its account of Li Song, the supposed forefather of Lý Công Uẩn, contains unverifiable claims when compared with the Historical Records of the Five Dynasties. Therefore, this genealogy book can't be treated as a trusworthy source.

Leaving aside the historical accounts during the Lý, Trần dynasties, which were destroyed by the Ming during the Fourth Era of Northern domination, all existing Vietnamese historical records asserting Lý Công Uẩn was a native were all compiled in more than 200 years after his lifetime. Those include Đại Việt sử ký (Trần dynasty, lost during the Fourth Era of Northern domination), Việt sử lược (Trần dynasty, author unknown) and Đại Việt sử ký toàn thư (Lê Thánh Tông's era). An Nam Chí Lược by Lê Tắc, which also asserted Lý Công Uẩn was a Jiaozhi native, was compiled approximately 300 years after Lý Công Uẩn's lifetime. Đại Việt sử ký toàn thư and Khâm định Việt sử Thông giám cương mục record the intimacy of Mrs Phạm, Lý Công Uẩn's mother, and a demigod, which resulted in his birth. This account has been strongly dismissed by historians due to its implausibility. Historians also argue why Lý Công Uẩn has to exaggerate his father as a demigod. Lịch triều hiến chương loại chí, an encyclopedia released before Khâm định Việt sử Thông giám cương mục, records that Mrs Phạm gave birth to Lý Công Uẩn at Tiêu Sơn pagoda then brought him to Cổ Pháp pagoda to be adopted by Patriarch Vạn Hạnh when Công Uẩn was 3 years old. This account is consistent with those found in earlier Vietnamese historical sources. However, it makes no mention of an intimacy between Mrs Phạm and the demigod.

Regarding Lý Công Uẩn as a native of Đại Cồ Việt, essayist Trần Siêu argued that Lý Công Uẩn was a descendant of the warlord Lý Khuê of the Anarchy of 12 warlords, and Hiển Khánh vương was the grandchild of Lý Khuê since his son married Mrs. Phạm Thị Ngà. However, this was merely a hypothesis and hasn't been accepted by the Vietnamese academic communities. After analysing all the theories, researcher Nguyễn Phúc Anh concludes that only the accounts Dream Pool Essays and Sushui Jiwen stating Hiển Khánh Vương was of the Min origin in are credible. Those who seek to refute this theory must therefore provide reliable historical sources.

== See also ==
- Lý Thái Tổ
- Vạn Hạnh

== Bibliography ==
=== Vietnamese sources ===
- Ngô Sĩ Liên (1993). Đại Việt sử ký toàn thư, Basic Annals (PDF) (in Vietnamese) (Nội các quan bản ed.). Hanoi: Social Science Publishing House, Volume II, Kỷ nhà Lý: Thái Tổ Hoàng Đế
- Unknown historian (1377). Đại Việt sử lược (PDF) (in Vietnamese). Vol. II: King Thái Tổ.
- Ngô Thì Sĩ (1800). Đại Việt sử ký tiền biên [Preliminary Chronicle of Dai Viet] (in Vietnamese). Vol. II, Kỷ nhà Lý - Thái tổ hoàng đế. Translated by Viện nghiên cứu Hán Nôm. Hanoi: Social science publisher (1997).
- National Bureau of Historiography of the Nguyễn dynasty (1884). Khâm Định Việt Sử Thông Giám Cương Mục [The Imperially Ordered Annotated Text Completely Reflecting the History of Viet] (PDF) (in Vietnamese). Education Publishing House.
- Lê Tắc (1961). An Nam chí lược (in Vietnamese). Translated by Ủy ban phiên dịch sử liệu Việt Nam.
- Phan Kế Bính (1909). Lê Văn Phúc (ed.). Nam Hải dị nhân liệt truyện (in Vietnamese), 4: Lý Thái-tổ
- Nguyễn Phúc Anh (2012). Những tư liệu về nguyên quán Lý Công Uẩn [Documents on the ancestral homeland of Lý Công Uẩn] (in Vietnamese). Tạp chí Nghiên cứu và Phát triển, No. 8–9 (Volumes 97–98).

=== Chinese sources ===
- Shen Kuo (1088), Dream Pool Essays
- Sima Guang (1997). Deng Guangming; Zhang Xiqing (eds.). Sushui Jiwen [Records Heard by Sima Guang at Sushui] (in Chinese). Beijing: Zhonghua Book Company.
