= Từ Sơn (city) =

Coordinates: 21°07′08″N 105°57′40″E

- Provincial city (Class-3)
- Từ Sơn City; Thành phố Từ Sơn
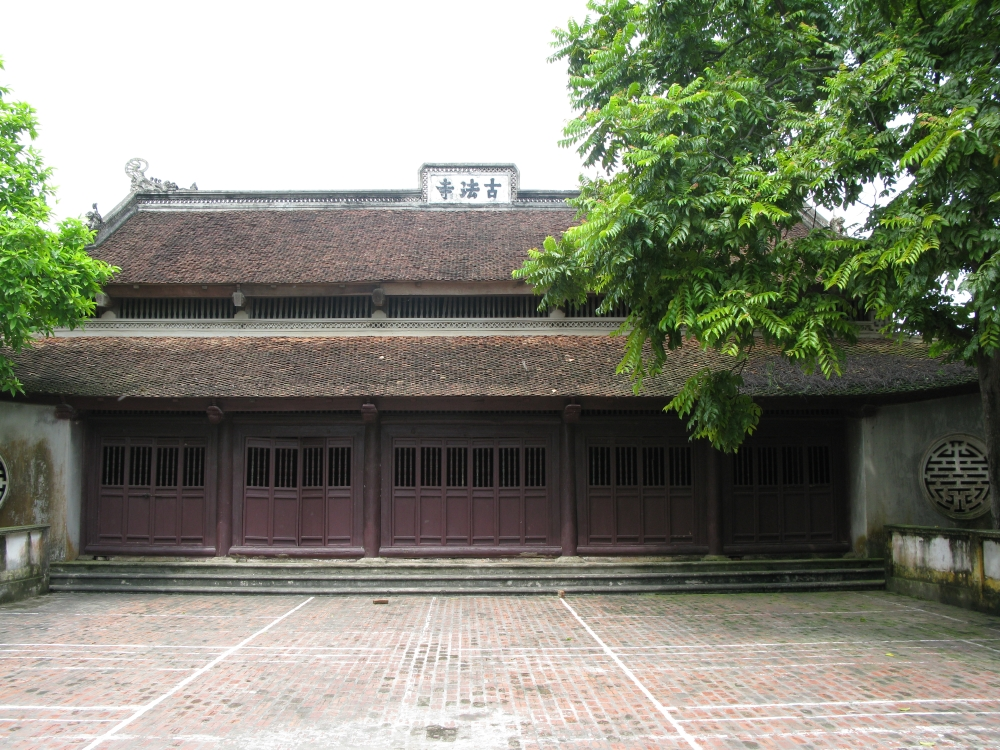
- Dan Pagoda in Từ Sơn.

- Seal
- Interactive map outlining Từ Sơn
- Location within Vietnam Location within Southeast Asia Location within Asia
- Country: Vietnam
- Region: Red River Delta
- Province: Bắc Ninh
- Capital: Từ Sơn

Area
  - Total: 61.08 km^{2} (23.58 sq mi)

Population (2021)
  - Total: 202,874
  - Density: 3,321/km^{2} (8,603/sq mi)
- Time zone: UTC+7 (Indochina Time)

Từ Sơn is a former city of Bắc Ninh Province in the Red River Delta region of Vietnam. As of 2021, Từ Sơn had a population of 202,874, covering an area of 61.08 km^{2}. The centre ward is Đông Ngàn, formerly Từ Sơn township.

In 974, Lý Thái Tổ was born in this town. The Lý Bát Đế Shrine is located here.
