= Lý Thái Tổ =

6th emperor of Đại Việt (r. 1009–28); founder of the Lý dynasty

Lý Thái Tổ 李太祖
- Great Emperor of Đại Cồ Việt
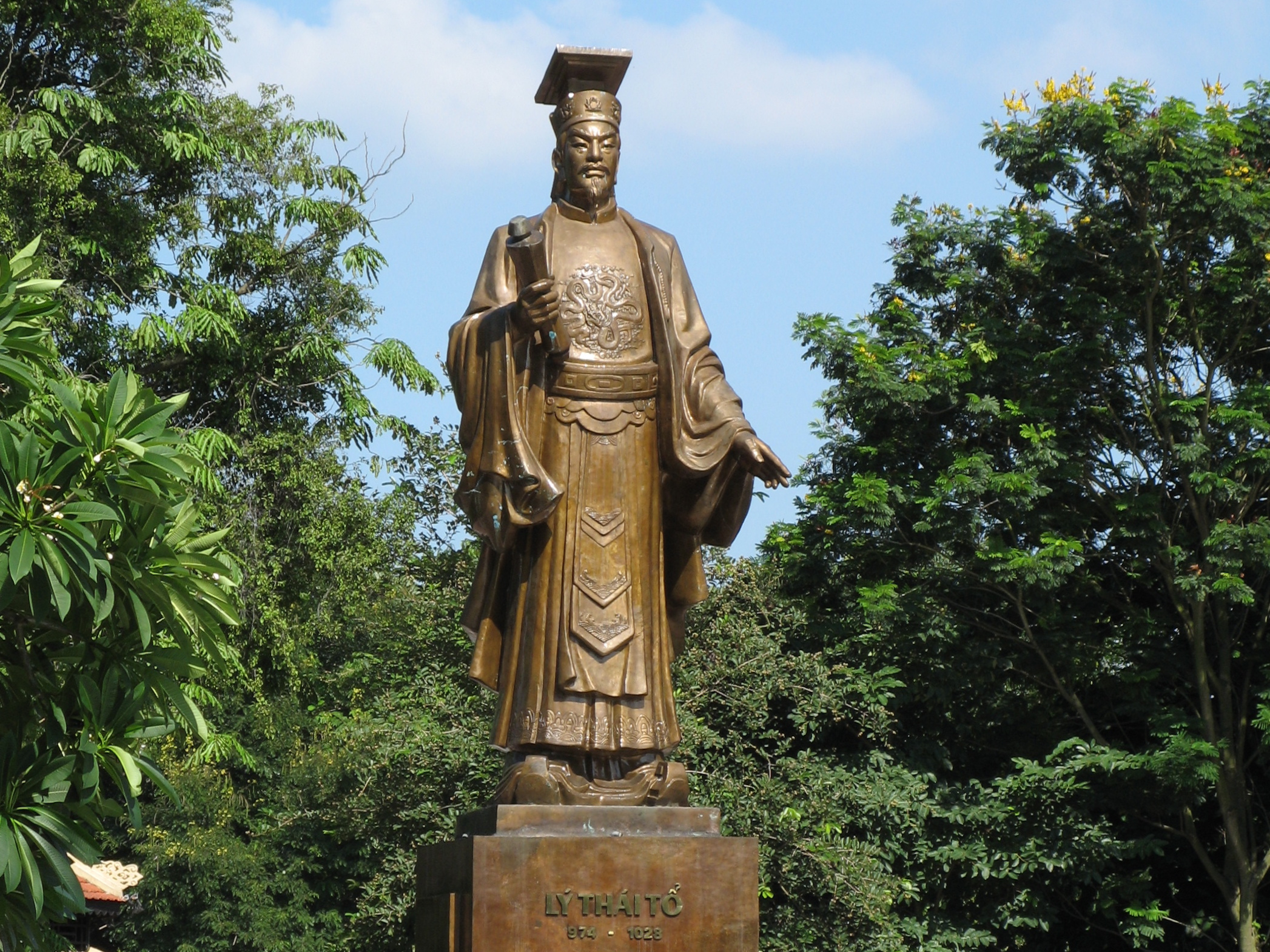
- Statue of Lý Thái Tổ beside the Hoàn Kiếm Lake in Hanoi

Emperor of Đại Cồ Việt
- Reign: 1009–1028
- Predecessor: Lê Long Đĩnh
- Successor: Lý Thái Tông

Emperor of the Lý dynasty
- Reign: 20 November 1009–31 March 1028
- Predecessor: Dynasty established
- Successor: Lý Thái Tông
- Born: 8 March, 974; Cổ Pháp, Bắc Ninh, Đại Cồ Việt
- Died: 31 March 1028 (aged 54); Thăng Long, Đại Cồ Việt
- Burial: Thọ Tomb
- Spouse: Lê Thị Phất Ngân and 8 other empresses
- Issue: Prince of Khai Thiên Lý Phật Mã as emperor Lý Thái Tông; Prince of Khai Quốc Lý Bồ; Prince of Đông Chinh Lý Lực; Prince of Vũ Đức (?–1028); Prince of Uy Minh Lý Nhật Quang; Princess An Quốc; 8 sons, and 13 daughters.
Names
- Lý Công Uẩn (李公蘊)
Era dates
- Thuận Thiên (順天; 1010–1028)
Regnal name
- Phụng Thiên Chí Lý Ứng Vận Tự Tại Thánh Minh Long Hiện Duệ Văn Anh Vũ Sùng Nhân Quảng Hiếu Thiên Hạ Thái Bình Khâm Minh Quảng Trạch Chương Chiêu Vạn Bang Hiển Ứng Phù Cảm Uy Chấn Phiên Man Duệ Mưu Thần Trợ Thánh Trị Tắc Thiên Đạo Chính Hoàng đế (奉天至理應運自在聖明龍見睿文英武崇仁廣孝天下太平欽明光宅章昭萬邦顯應符感威震藩蠻睿謀神功聖治則天道政皇帝)
Posthumous name
- Thần Vũ Hoàng đế (神武皇帝)
Temple name
- Thái Tổ (太祖)
- House: Lý
- Father: Hiển Khánh vương
- Mother: Minh Đức Thái hậu Phạm Thị
- Religion: Buddhism

- Temple name
- Vietnamese alphabet: Lý Thái Tổ
- Chữ Hán: 李太祖

- Personal name
- Vietnamese alphabet: Lý Công Uẩn
- Chữ Hán: 李公蘊

Lý Thái Tổ ( chữ Hán: 李太祖, 8 March 974 – 31 March 1028), personal name Lý Công Uẩn (李公蘊), was the founding emperor of the Lý dynasty. He reigned the empire for 18 years, from 1009 until his death in 1028.

With the background as a military personnel under the Anterior Lê dynasty, Công Uẩn was quickly promoted to Palace Commander and held a strong position at the royal court. After the death of Emperor Lê Hoàn, the Lê dynasty immediately fell into crisis due to wars among the princes for the throne. The succession crisis officially ended when Lê Long Đĩnh ascended the throne. However, Lê Long Đĩnh died young and ruled the empire for only four years. With great prestige and widespread renown throughout the empire, Lý Công Uẩn was enthroned by the royal court, thereby establishing the Lý dynasty - the very first Vietnamese dynasty to endure for more than two centuries, ruling for a total of 216 years and experiencing periods of both prosperity and crisis.

The first achievement of his reign was the relocation of the capital from Hoa Lư to Đại La which was later renamed Thăng Long. This event marked the beginning of more than 1000 years of Hà Nội's history as the capital. During his reign, Đại Cồ Việt witnessed numerous achievements in economic and agricultural development, administrative and territorial reforms, tax reform, and the promotion of Buddhism. In addition, his reign successfully suppressed all domestic uprisings, achieved victories in wars against Champa and Dali, thereby secured widespread popular loyalty. Neighboring states such as Champa and Chenla paid tribute, while the Song Empire refrained from exerting pressure and instead maintained peaceful relations with Đại Cồ Việt. His 18-year rule built a strong foundation for the Lý dynasty. In recognition of his great contributions to history, the Ministry of Culture, Sports and Tourism of the Socialist Republic of Vietnam officially designated him as one of the 14 Vietnamese national heroes.

== Early years ==
Lý Công Uẩn was born in Cổ Pháp district, Đình Bảng's village, Từ Sơn, Bắc Ninh Province in 974. There are no historical records about his maternal side except that his mother was surnamed Phạm. The identity of his birth-father is unknown although he was posthumously granted the title Duke of Hiển Khánh when Công Uẩn was enthroned. Although Vietnamese chronicle Đại Việt sử ký toàn thư and Đại Việt sử lược recorded Công Uẩn's mother only by the surname Phạm, or referred to her as Mrs. Phạm, local folklore associated with the historical relics in Dương Lôi (Từ Sơn, Bắc Ninh) states that her name was Phạm Thị Ngà. Đại Việt sử ký toàn thư and Khâm định Việt sử record that when Mrs Phạm went sightseeing at Tiêu Sơn temple, she was intimate with a demigod, and later gave birth to Công Uẩn. Gregory Sattler however notes that scholars have long debated Lý Công Uẩn's precise origins, since many of the Vietnamese records may not be taken at face value as they were written several centuries after his death. Sattler notes that Lý Công Uẩn's family was already influential before his own rise to power, suggesting that this aspect of his background may have been neglected by later writers seeking to emphasize his divine birth.

Đại Việt sử lược also records Công Uẩn has an elder brother, later entitled Duke of Vũ Uy, and a younger brother, later entitled Duke of Dực Thánh. Đại Việt sử ký toàn thư also records that Công Uẩn has an uncle, who was entitled Duke of Vũ Đạo.

Still according to Đại Việt sử ký toàn thư, Công Uẩn's mother gave him up for adoption to a Buddhist monk named Lý Khánh Vân at the age of three. From an early age, Công Uẩn proved himself to be an extraordinarily intelligent boy with an impressive physical appearance. At the age of six or seven, he was sent to Lục Tổ Pagoda in Đình Bảng village, to be raised by the Buddhist monk Vạn Hạnh, the most eminent Buddhist patriarch of the time. Upon seeing Công Uẩn, Vạn Hạnh immediately said: "This boy is exceptional, he will grow up to resolve the nation’s problems and be a great emperor".

Growing up, Công Uẩn was an upright and ambitious man, who had no interest in material riches, and just loved delving into Confucian classics and Buddhist scriptures, though his knowledge of them remained largely at an overview level. He acquired a reputation as a devout Buddhist, and then a historian student, and a soldier. According to the Lê royal genealogy in Bảo Thái, Hà Nam (present-day Ninh Bình) and historical sources from Hoa Lư Ancient Capital, Công Uẩn followed Patriarch Vạn Hạnh to serve emperor Lê Hoàn in Hoa Lư annually. The emperor then allowed Công Uẩn to stayed at the court to learn military affairs, married his daughter Lê Thị Phất Ngân off to him, and gradually promoted him from a minor official to Điện Tiền Chỉ Huy Sứ (Commander of the Palace). However, Đại Việt sử lược records that Lý Công Uẩn served the Lê royal court during the Ứng Thiên era (994-1005), while Khâm định Việt sử Thông giám cương mục records his serving in the middle of the that era. Until 1003, emperor Lê Hoàn starts being sickness, and finally died in 1005. Before 1003, during the Ứng Thiên era, the emperor regularly led campaigns to suppress rebellions and barbarians, all of which resulted in victory. From these events, it can be inferred that Lý Công Uẩn married the emperor’s princess, Phất Ngân, became a military personnel, and later rising to the rank of general, in the middle of the Ứng Thiên era, between 1000 and 1003. No historical sources record any contributions of Lý Công Uẩn to emperor Lê Hoàn during this era.

In 1005, emperor Lê Hoàn died, resulting in a civil war between his sons which lasted 8 months over the succession to the throne. By the end of 1005, Lê Long Việt was successfully enthroned as emperor Lê Trung Tông, but was assassinated by the thugs of Lê Long Đĩnh just 3 days after his enthronement. All mandarins fled the royal court for fear of being executed by Long Đĩnh following the coup d’état. Only Lý Công Uẩn remained at the court, embracing the body of Long Việt and mourning him. Long Đĩnh was surprised by this and praised Công Uẩn’s loyalty, rather than executing him for siding with the deposed emperor. The coup-installed emperor Lê Long Đĩnh then promoted Công Uẩn to Tứ sương quân Phó Chỉ huy sứ (Deputy Commander of the Tứ Sương Army) then was ultimately bestowed with the title Tả Thân Vệ Điện Tiền Chỉ Huy Sứ (The Commander of the Palace's Left Flank), which was one of the most important positions within the royal guards. This is the very first time Lý Công Uẩn is recorded by historians. Before that, during the 8 months civil war for the throne, only Đại Việt sử ký tiền biên recorded that Lý Công Uẩn supported Long Việt, while no other historical records clearly state which side Lý Công Uẩn supported, but it can reasonably be inferred that as Long Việt’s, given that Công Uẩn mourned for his death after his assassination. The entire empire descended into chaos as a result of the civil war, which left the court without an emperor for eight months. Not until Long Đĩnh was enthroned and had defeated all rival princes, did the empire return to peace, with all princes and bandits capitulating to the royal court.

Before the assassination of Long Việt and the enthronement of Long Đĩnh, at Ứng Thiên Tâm pagoda in Cổ Pháp village, a dog gave birth to a puppy with white hair marked by a black fur spot forming the Chinese characters for “Son of Heaven." Confucian scholars throughout the empire at this time believed that a man born in the year of the dog would become emperor. Lý Công Uẩn was also born in the year of the dog, in 974.

During his 5 years ruling, emperor Lê Long Đĩnh launched many military campaigns to suppress rebellions and barbarians throughout the realm, as well as dealing with the invasion threat from the Song dynasty. There are no historical records indicating any involvements of Lý Công Uẩn in those events. All military campaigns during this period are recorded in detail as having been personally led by Lê Long Đĩnh, with no mention of the emperor issuing any imperial edicts authorizing Lý Công Uẩn or other generals to launch those campaigns. The wrongdoing of the emperor - such as his arousal when torturing and abusing the captured defeated forces, engaging in debauchery, and allowing disorder at the royal court, including letting clowns to mock the presentation of the mandarins - are not mentioned to be criticized and restrained by Lý Công Uẩn, who served as a general during this reign (while histories of East Asian countries strong praised the mandarins who criticized imperial wrongdoing). Đại Việt sử ký toàn thư records the folk stories of Long Đĩnh as a hedonistic tyrant who died of hemorrhoids, yet it contains no political activities of Lý Công Uẩn during this reign. Only An Nam chí lược of the Trần dynasty born historian Lê Tắc during the Yan dynasty briefly records: "Lý Công Uẩn was born in Jiaozhou (while someone incorrectly claimed him to be born in Fujian), and renowned for his administrative talent, Lê Chí Trung (Note: Chinese historians referred to Lê Long Đĩnh as Lê Chí Trung.) appointed him as the General officer, and is also his close aide."

== Enthronement ==
According to Đại Việt sử ký toàn thư and Việt sử lược, during the reign of Lê Long Đỉnh, in Diên Uẩn village (Cổ Pháp province), there was a kapok tree struck by a lightning. The resulting marks formed a poem which is called by Vietnamese historian as Sấm cây gạo (The kapok tree prophecy):

Thụ Căn yểu yểu
Mộc biểu thanh thanh
Hòa đao mộc lạc
Thập bác tử thành
Chấn cung xuất nhựt
Đoài cung ẩn tinh
Lục thất niên gian
Thiên hạ thái bình

English translation based on the original translation from Đại Việt sử ký toàn thư and Việt sử lược:

The root is deep
The tree bark is green
Peach tree falls
Eighteen children are born
The Eastern sun rises
The western star fades
Approximately six, seven years
Peace is brought to the realm

Thụ Căn yểu yểu (The root is deep), the root symbolizes to the emperor, "yểu" means short-live. It predicts the emperor is short-live. Mộc biểu thanh thanh (The tree bark is green), bark symbolizes the mandarins under the emperor, while green signifies flourishing or prosperity. The phrase thus indicates that the mandarinate would flourish. In the third sentence, Hòa (禾) + Đao (刀) + Mộc (木) combine to form the character Lê (黎), this indicates the fall of the Lê dynasty. In the fourth sentence, Thập (十) + Bát (八) + Tử (子) combine to form the character Lý (李), which is interpreted as indicating the establishment of the Lý clan or dynasty.

The first four sentences are interpreted as predicting the fall of the Lê dynasty and the rise of the Lý dynasty. The final four sentences are understood as indicating historical events up to the Trịnh–Nguyễn warlord era. However, footnotes in the 1993 edition of Đại Việt sử ký toàn thư claim the last four sentences were entirely fabricated by the historians of the Trần and Later Lê dynasty in order to legitimize their rule through the Mandate of Heaven theory.

News about the kapok tree prophecy started spreading all over the realm. Patriarch Vạn Hạnh told Công Uẩn: "I have seen the prophecy glyphs indicates that the Lý's clan will flourish and rise to the throne. There are so many people who bear the surname Lý in this realm, yet none possess have the warm heart like yours, Commander. You are now in charge of the national guard. If it is not you who governs the empire, then no one will. I'm in my 70s now, and simply want a peaceful death. However, I just wanna see your morality turn into the kingship, which is a once-in-a-thousand-years chance." From that moment, Công Uẩn developed the idea to rise to the throne being held by the Lê clan, but he feared that the words of Patriach Vạn Hạnh would be exposed publicly, so he asked his brother to hide Vạn Hạnh in Tiêu Sơn. By that time, public sentiment had already rallied around Công Uẩn.

Aware of the kapok tree prophecy, Lê Long Đĩnh once ate a pear (Vietnamese: lê/quả lê) and found a jambos (Vietnamese: lý/quả lý) seed inside, an omen that convinced him of the prophecy. The emperor then ordered his men to secretly murder people bearing the surname Lý, but Lý Công Uẩn still remained unharmed as if nothing had happened. Palace attendant (Note: The Sino-Vietnamese term for Đào Cam Mộc's occupation is "Chi hậu" (祗候). There are no historical records that clearly explain this position or specify whether it was associated with the military, court hospitality, or events organizing for the royal court. Historical movies like Lý Công Uẩn: Đường tới thành Thăng Long (with Chi hậu Đỗ Thích), and Về đất Thăng Long (with Chi hậu Đào Cam Mộc) portray "Chi hậu" as a lieutenant; however, those movies include many fictional historical events.) Đào Cam Mộc, who had already known of Công Uẩn’s ambition for kingship, tried to taunt Công Uẩn into taking the throne during a private, one-on-one conversation. Công Uẩn was pleased by that and pretended to scold Cam Mộc for saying so, then threaten to expose his "treason words" to the royal court, but those were merely Công Uẩn's ruse for Cam Mộc to prove his commitment. Cam Mộc replied at ease: "I simply based on the Mandate of Heaven and the public sentiment to say so. If you want to report my words to the court, feel free to do so – I'm not afraid of dead." Công Uẩn replied: "I can't bear to do that. But I'm scared of your words might be exposed, so I just say this as a warning." Cam Mộc then discussed that idea with the empress dowager to enthrone Công Uẩn. The next day, Cam Mộc persuaded Công Uẩn to ascend the throne, saying: "All then people in the realm know the Lý clan has begun a big dream, the prophecy is absolutely true and no one can conceal it. Let us turn that adversity into fortune in just one day. It's the Mandate of Heaven, why are you still worried and delaying ?". Công Uẩn replied: "I fully get your idea, which is no different from Vạn Hanh's. So what should we do if those words are true ?". Cam Mộc continues: "Commander, you are a man with a warm heart who already commands public support. In those days, the realm was exhausted and oppressed. You should take advantages of that to comfort the nation, then people will rally around you, like water cascading from a waterfall, no one will be able to stop it !"

In 1009, emperor Lê Long Đĩnh, who had already developed serious illnesses due to his hedonistic lifestyle, had to lie down while listening to officials’ reports, while folk stories claim his hemorrhoids leads to his lying down during court affair. Incapacitated by declining health, Long Đĩnh watched helplessly as people launched a propaganda campaign that nurtured belief in the inevitability of Lý Công Uẩn becoming king. Since news of the upcoming regime change to the Lý clan had spread throughout the realm, Đào Cao Mộc felt rushed and discussed that idea with the royal court, which gained strongly support from all of them. Emperor Long Đĩnh died on 19th November 1009 under the wrath of the people because of his brutality and cruelty during his reign. Two day after his death, the royal court declared: "Millions of people in realm are divided, and harbor hatred toward the royal court due to the tyranny of the late emperor. No one wished to see the throne pass to his descendants; instead, they desired it to be bestowed upon the Commander of the Palace. If we don't enthrone the Commander at this moment, can we truly expect to keep our heads when chaos or crisis arises ?". The royal court then escorted Công Uẩn to the main hall and proclaimed him emperor. All mandarins knelt and exclaimed: "Long live the king!", after which they bestowed upon him his regnal name: "Phụng Thiên Chí Lý ứng Vận Tự Tại Thánh Minh Long Hiện Duệ Văn Anh Vũ Sùng Nhân Quảng Hiếu Thiên Hạ Thái Bình Khâm Minh Quang Trạch Chương Minh Vạn Bang Hiển Ứng Phù Cảm Uy Chấn Phiên Man Duệ Mưu Thần Trợ Thánh Tri Tắc Thiên Đạo Chính Hoàng Đế". The incident in which Công Uẩn accepted the regnal title of more than 50 words was criticized by historian Ngô Sĩ Liên in Đại Việt sử ký toàn thư: "The Book of Documents gave emperor Yao the title Fangxun (放勳) and emperor Shun the title Chonghua (重華). According to custom, the subjects bestowed regnal titles based on the emperors’ virtues, and even then the titles were no more than ten characters long. However, in this case, the subjects submitted a regnal title of 50 words, something without precedent in historical records and clearly an act of flattery. Emperor Lý Thái Tổ accepted it without objection, which suggests that he indulged such praise, showed off and boasted so that no one in the future could surpass him. This was improper. His successor, Emperor Lý Thái Tông, also adopted a regnal title of nearly 50 words, repeating the same practice."

Lý Công Uẩn ascended the throne on 21st November 1009, officially established the Lý dynasty. Historians also named his dynasty the Later Lý to distinguish it from the Anterior Lý of Lý Nam Đế. After his ascension to the throne, Lý Công Uẩn named his era "Thuận Thiên" (順天) meaning "Accordance with Heaven['s Will]". He posthumously conferred the title of Duke of Hiển Khánh on his father, Minh Đức Empress Dowager on his mother; and conferred the title Duke of Vũ Đạo on his uncle, Duke of Vũ Uy on his elder brother, and Duke of Dực Thánh on his younger brother. He established six empresses; his eldest son, Lý Phật Mã, was appointed Crown Prince. His other sons were also conferred the title of duke. Đào Cam Mộc was conferred the title of Marquis of Nghĩa Tín and was married to princess An Quốc (daughter of Công Uẩn). Lý Bảo Hòa, another princess of Công Uẩn, was married to the chieftain Giáp Thừa Quý. This marriage marked the beginning of the heqin tradition in Vietnamese feudal dynastic history, in which the emperor's princesses were married to chieftains in order to secure their loyalty to the royal court.

Based on the basic annals, the enthronement of Lý Công Uẩn and the dynastic transition occurred without civil war. However, according to An Nam chí lược, in 1009, when Lê Long Đĩnh died and his crown princess was still a minor child, his two brothers Lê Minh Đề and Lê Minh Xưởng launched a military campaign for the throne, only to be killed by Công Uẩn.

In Đại Việt sử ký tiền biên, historian Ngô Thì Sĩ recorded a conspiracy theory circulating in the realm, yet found no solid evidence to support the allegation that Lý Công Uẩn poisoned Lê Long Đĩnh to seize the throne.

"Some people say the Duke of Khai Minh is fiercely aggressive and ruthless, while Lý Thái Tổ's status and prestige are steadily rising, and all court officials are his close aids. Lý Thái Tổ is deeply outraged by the murder of emperor Long Việt to usurp the throne by the Duke of Khai Minh. While the Duke of Khai Minh is sick, Thái Tổ sends people to poison him then covers up this incident, so there are no historical records of it. If this was indeed the case, it may have been regarded as the will of God and an act of karmic retribution. Therefore, this account is recorded only as an appendix as a deterrent"

— Đại Việt sử ký tiền biên - Ngô Thì Sĩ

Revisiting the story of the kapok tree prophecy which led to the dynastic transition, historian Ngô Thì Sĩ in Việt Sử Tiêu Án concluded that Patriarch Vạn Hạnh simply based on a natural incident when a lightning struck a kapok tree to make up an entire prophetic poem, cloaking it in mysticism to manipulate public sentiment. Ngô Thì Sĩ also pointed out that in the kapok tree prophecy, the lines from "Chấn cung xuất nhựt" till the end are all ambiguous, which later generations rashly interpreted to justify their treasonous acts; such a terribly made up prophetic poem led to the chaotic regime changes. Comments from Khâm định Việt sử Thông giám cương mục also conclude that the kapok tree prophecy is simply the reluctant interpretation of the Lý dynasty historians for the enthronement of Lý Công Uẩn, making it sound mystical, and is also the parody of the omen associated with the enthronement of Zhao Kuangyin, according to Book of the History of Song. By that, Chai Rong was reading a book collection after a northern campaign when he found a wooden plaque that said "The inspector-general is to be emperor". Feeling uneasy and believing it to be an omen, Chai replaced the incumbent Inspector-General of the Palace Command, Zhang Yongde, with Zhao Kuangyin. As the omen seemed to foretell, Zhao Kuangyin later became emperor after the Chenqiao mutiny, established the Song dynasty.

== Reign ==
=== Capital relocation to Đại La ===
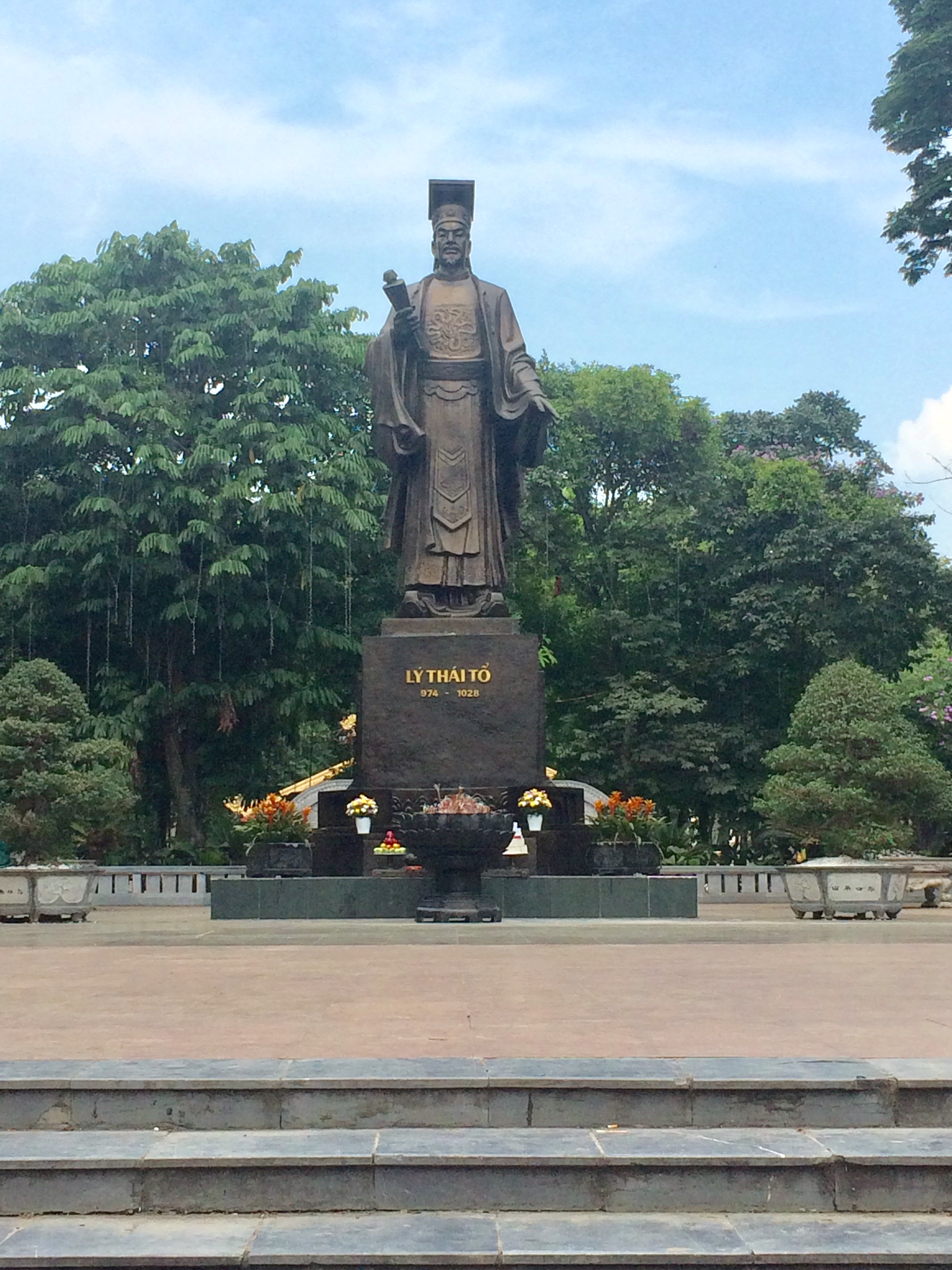
Ly Thai To statue, Hanoi, Vietnam.

Hoa Lư, which was the capital of the two earlier dynasties, Đinh and Anterior Lê, can be considered a natural fortress due its position between the mountains in the southeast of the Red River Delta, controlling the routes from the Red River Delta to the southern provinces and serving as a military outpost for these regions. After ascending the throne, the emperor considered Hoa Lư to be "a narrow citadel in a low-lying, damp area that could not serve as a place for emperors," and therefore wanted to relocate the capital to Đại La (modern-day Hanoi). Đại La was known as the city that the Tang general Gao Pian had built in the 860s after the ravages of the Nanzhao War. The emperor chose the site because it had been an earlier capital in the rich Red River Delta. He saw Đại La as a place "between Heaven and Earth where the coiling dragon and the crouching tiger lie, and his capital would last 10,000 years". He issued a self-written edict, which is known today as Edict on the Transfer of the Capital:

"The Shang dynasty under Pan Geng moved its capital five times, and the Zhou dynasty under king Cheng moved three times. Did these kings of the Three Dynasties move their capitals for personal gain? No, they did so to establish great enterprises, to choose the most central and favorable location, ensuring prosperity for their descendants for ten thousand generations. They respected the Mandate of Heaven above and followed the desires of the people below. Whenever a location proved convenient, they relocated, thus ensuring the long-lasting stability of their dynasties, the prosperity of their lands, and the well-being of their people.

However, the Đinh and Lê dynasties acted differently. They followed their personal preferences, disregarded the will of Heaven, and ignored historical precedents. They remained content in a small, enclosed land, failing to secure long-term peace and prosperity. As a result, their reigns were short-lived, their influence limited, and their people suffered. This causes me great sorrow, and I cannot help but move the capital.

Furthermore, Đại La, the former capital of Gao Pian, is located in the heart of the nation’s territory. It possesses the strategic position of a coiled dragon and crouching tiger, facing the cardinal directions in perfect alignment. The land is vast and flat, elevated and dry, free from flooding and natural disasters. The population is not subjected to hardship, and all living things flourish. Upon surveying the entire nation, no other place compares to this superior land. It is truly the central hub of the four directions, the ideal place for an everlasting imperial capital.

Therefore, I wish to take advantage of this great geographical blessing and establish the new capital here. What do you, my officials, think?"

All court officials totally agreed with the emperor, saying: "Your Majesty established great enterprises for the people throughout the realm. God blessed Your Majesty with great imperial prosperity, while your fellow citizens lived in densely populated and prosperous communities. No one dared not to rally around you."

The royal court decided to relocate from Hoa Lư to the site of Đại La (modern-day Hanoi) in the next year, 1010. In 1010, Lý Công Uẩn published an edict explaining why he moved his capital to Dai La. When Lý Công Uẩn's boat docked at the new capital, a dragon, symbol of sovereign authority, reportedly soared above his head; he accordingly renamed the place Thăng Long, the "ascending dragon".

The royal city at Thăng Long was laid out in the standard pattern: the urban center encompassed the Royal City. The Throne Room Palace was located within a Dragon Courtyard and faced south. The Crown Prince of the Lý dynasty lived in the Eastern Palace outside the city walls. Palaces and offices were constructed of timber. Càn Nguyên Palace where the king held audience was located on the Nùng hill. By 1010, 11 palaces were built in Thăng Long. The earthworks which were ramparts of the new capital still stand to the west of the modern city of Hanoi, forming a vast quadrilateral by the side of the road to Sơn Tây.

=== Domestic policies ===
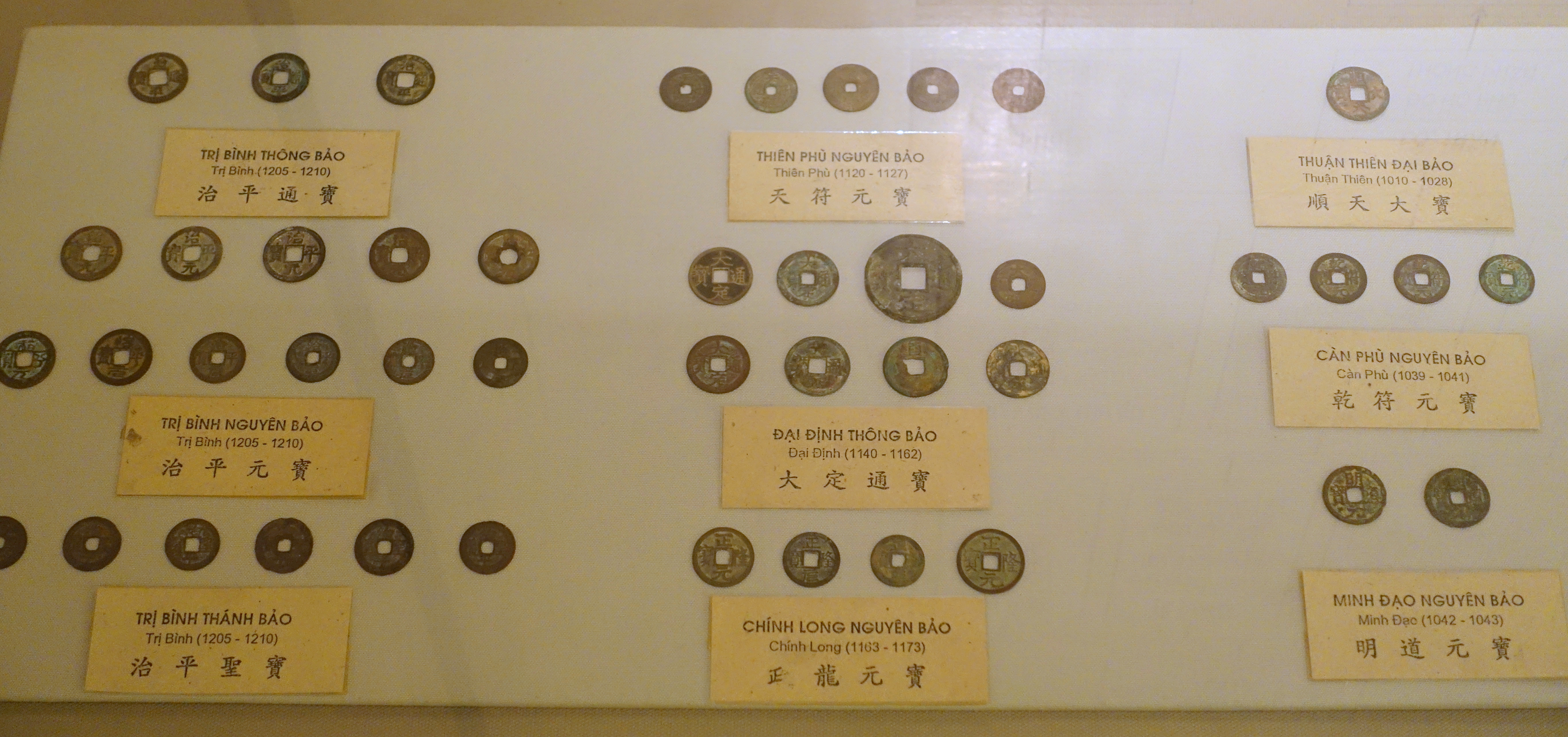
Coin issued by Ly Thai To (top, right)

The outer regions of the Red River Delta, beyond the Lý heartland, were in the hands of families allied with the Lý family by marriage. Lý Thái Tổ abandoned a scheme of dividing the plain into "ten circuits" that had been devised by Đinh Bộ Lĩnh (r. 968–979) and replaced it with 24 routes; these were not administrative jurisdictions but rather itineraries designating various localities. He organized the southern provinces into military outposts, indicating a policy of garrisons and patrols. Officials did not receive a salary controlled by the capital, but were entirely dependent upon local resources, a region's fish and rice. The soldiers did receive some largesse at the same time as they were expected to do some farming of their own. The village communities scattered about the countryside stayed within their own frames of reference except in times of emergency or of specific royal demands. Only then would they interact with the central power. Otherwise they sent some of their resources to the local lord, who in turn forwarded a share as tribute to the throne. This administrative system resembles a naturally Southeast Asian mandala system.

In 1011, Lý Thái Tổ raised a large army and attacked rebels in the southern provinces, in what is now Thanh Hoá and Nghệ An. He campaigned there for two years, burning villages and capturing local leaders. While returning by sea in late 1012, a great storm threatened to sink his boat, which he understood as a divine judgment upon him for the violence he had brought upon so many people.

For three years, 1013–1015, Lý Thái Tổ sent soldiers into the northern mountains of modern Hà Giang Province to pacify Hani people who allied with the Dali Kingdom in Yunnan.

He also reformed the tax system in 1013 by creating six tax classifications, which enabled the royal court to efficiently collect taxes and citizens to clearly know which tax classification affected them, for instance, applied mostly to goods produced on royal estates:

- Tax on fishing and seafood production
- Tax on agricultural production (farming)
- Tax on logging/wood and masonry
- Tax on salt production
- Tax on luxury goods production (ivory, gold, silk, precious materials, etc.)
- Tax on fruits and vegetable production

When a severe earthquake occurred in 1016, Lý Thái Tổ prayed to the gods that were in charge of the mountains surrounding the capital, while also sending more than 1,000 people to teach in Buddhist schools. He journeyed around his kingdom both to propitiate its disparate genies and co-opt them by having them "declare" themselves to him.

=== Foreign affairs ===
Location of Dali and Dai Viet kingdoms; Song, Xia and Liao empires during 11-12th century

During the reign of Lý Thái Tổ, the Song dynasty was pre-occupied with maintaining internal stability and still recovering from previous defeats or skirmishes with the Liao dynasty and Western Xia. Đại Việt, as a result, was mostly left alone and political relations between the two states revived. In 1010, the Song emperor recognized Lý Công Uẩn without delay, conferring upon him the usual titles of vassalage.

In 1010, Lý Thái Tổ attacked and caught thirteen persons of Địch Lão (bandit) ethnicity and presented the captives to the Chinese court. In August 1014, he sent a mission to China, presented 60 horses as gifts and notified the Song court that he had subdued a Hani community.

== Religious activities ==
Having begun life as a Buddhist monk, Lý Thái Tổ practiced Buddhism and promoted it as the national religion. As a result, he gave much support to the Buddhist clergy and institutions. He donated money to build pagodas throughout Đại Việt. Initially, he built 8 Buddhist temples in the Tiên Du area, heart land of Vietnamese Buddhism and three others around the capital region itself.

Consistent with his geo-administrative vision and his kingship to appease and tame the spirit world, during the eleventh century the Lý court "brought back" to Thăng Long a firmament of local spirits that had long dominated more distant regions of the kingdom. The spirits of the Trưng sisters from the western delta, the earth genie of Phù Đổng north of the capital, and the Mountain of Bronze Drum god from Thanh Hoá in Ái to the south were all relocated to the capital and housed there in temples specially dedicated to them. If these spirits were "symbols of regional powers", their pacification involved the extension of monarchical authority to the regions of Đại Việt.

In 1024, a temple was built for Lý Thái Tổ to use for reading and reciting the Buddhist scriptures, a copy of which he had requested and received from the Song court a few years earlier. After establishing suitable relationships with the terrestrial powers, he showed an interest in establishing proper relationships with the supernatural powers, patronizing the Buddhist religion and local cults, thereby cultivating a cultural basis for his authority. Thereafter he began to withdraw from public affairs. In 1025, Vạn Hạnh died. He had been Lý Thái Tổ's teacher, mentor, and, to some extent, father figure. He had previously been an advisor to Lê Hoàn and was a central figure in effecting the transition from the Lê family at Hoa Lư to the Lý family at Thăng Long. It seems that Lý Thái Tổ's royal personality was in some degree animated as an extension of Vạn Hạnh's expectations of him, for from this time little of note is recorded about Lý Thái Tổ until his death in the spring of 1028.

== Death ==
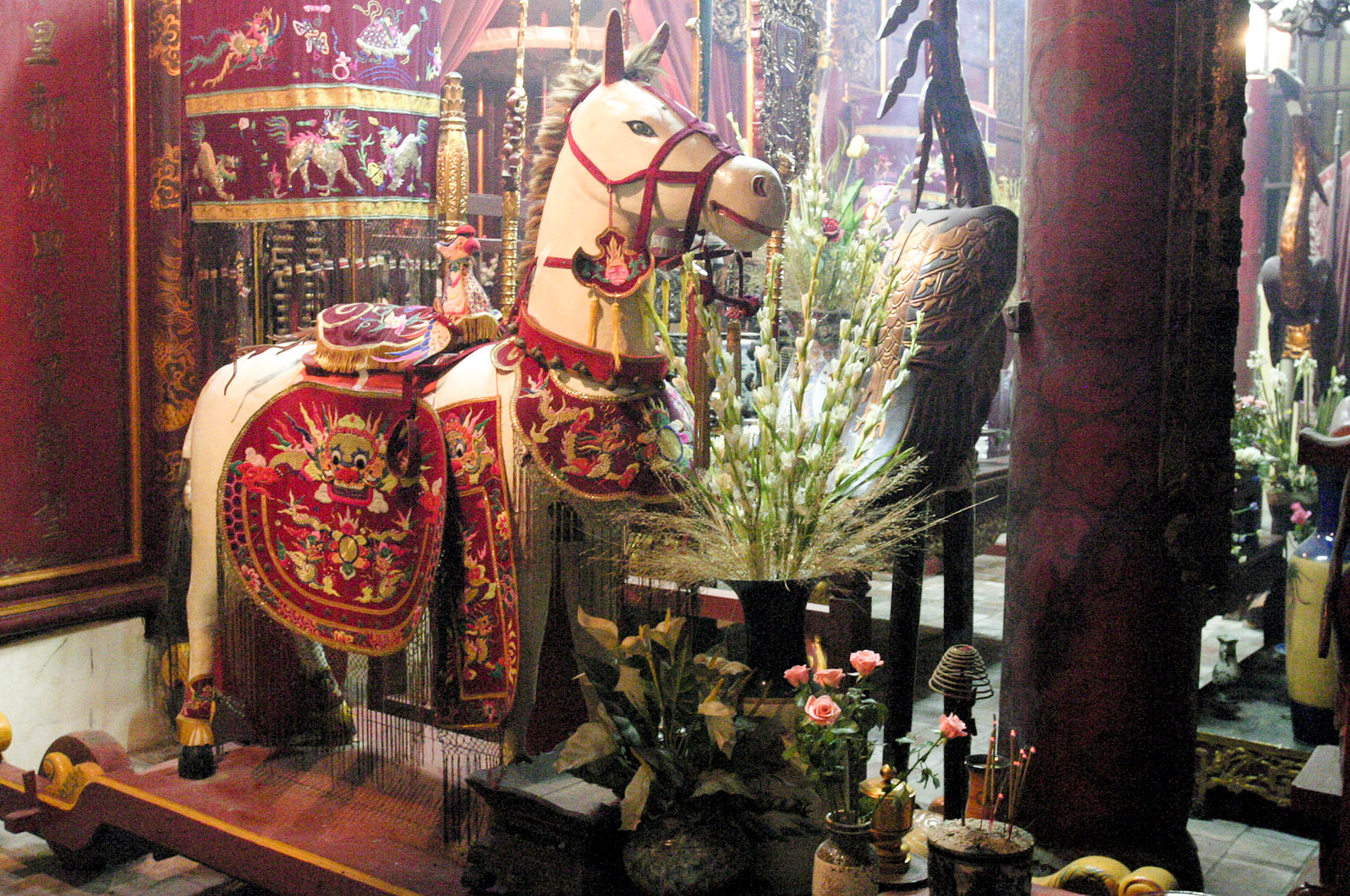
Inside the Bạch Mã Temple, completed during the reign of Lý Thái Tổ

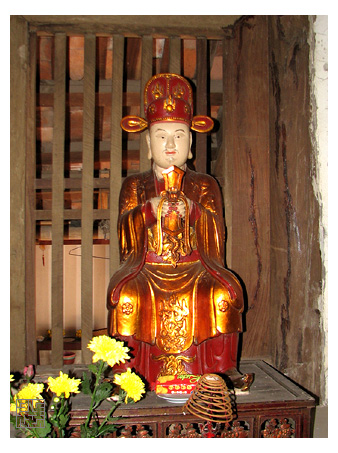
Emperor Lý Thái Tổ statue in Kiến Sơ Temple, Gia Lâm, Hanoi, Vietnam

Lý Công Uẩn died in 1028 at the age of 55 according to the royal official accounts. He was buried at Thọ Lăng, the Mausoleum of Longevity, outside of Thiên Đức Palace. He was posthumously named as "Lý Thái Tổ"; his posthumous imperial title was "Thần Võ Hoàng Đế". Today the ancestor spirit of Lý Thái Tổ is among those popularly honoured in rites at national shrines.

== Assessment ==
The later historians from Trần, Lê and Nguyễn dynasties all praised Lý Thái Tổ for his achievements as a ruler. Historian Lê Văn Hưu commented in Đại Việt sử ký:

Some one asks: Who was the better ruler, Lê Đại Hành or Lý Thái Tổ? The answer is this: Regarding the suppression of domestic rebellions and repelling of foreign invasion, the strengthening of our state, and flexing our power to the Song, then Lý Thái Tổ did not measure up to Lê Đại Hành. However, when regarding the people gratitude toward the king, establishing a long-lasting dynasty, and leaving a lasting legacy for descendants, then Lê Đại Hành did not measure up to Lý Thái Tổ. So does that make Lý Thái Tổ better a ruler than Lê Đại Hành ? The answer is that it is unclear which of the two was the better ruler. We can only conclude that the legacy of the Lý dynasty endured longer than that of the Lê dynasty. That may explain why people rallied around the Lý clan.

— This annals were lost, and was quoted in Đại Việt sử ký toàn thư

The incident in which the emperor accepted the regnal title of more than 50 words, including many exaggerated flattering words, was criticized not only by the historian Ngô Sĩ Liên during the Lê Thánh Tông's era, but also by the historian Nguyễn Nghiễm in the Đại Việt Sử ký tiền biên, during the Lê Hiển Tông's era:

"Shun was a good king during the reign of the Five Emperors. Chroniclers praised his legacy to the skies, yet they used only a few words in his regnal title—not a single word more. And that title encompassed everything about him. Lý Thái Tổ took advantage of Ngoạ Triều's hedonism, while the people rallied around him and supported his enthronement, thereby truly fulfilling Heaven's will. And even if he had greater virture than Yellow Emperor, or even greater than Emperor Yao, there shall not be exaggerated flattering words like that. At that time, many court officials are materialistic and praised the emperor to the skies. Words in his regnal titles such as "chí lý" (profoundly wise) "tự tại” (remained untroubled), are essentially meaningless, while the phrase "thánh minh long hiện duệ" (descendant of the divine Dragon King) sounded absurd. A king of average ability should be annoyed upon receiving such exaggerated praise from his court officials and should easily have recognized that as an act of flattery. Yet, Lý Thái Tổ remained silent and accepted those words without objection. How could that be plausible ? If he had any sense of self respect, he should be ashamed of himself for accepting such blatant flattery."

== Legacy ==
The Lý Thái Tổ a Gepard-class frigate in service with the Vietnam People's Navy since 2011 is named after him.

== Family ==
- Father
  - Hiển Khánh vương (posthumously honored by Lý Thái Tổ in 1010)
  - Lý Khánh Vân (adoptive father)
- Mother
  - Phạm Thị Ngà
- Brothers
  - Dực Thánh Vương (翊聖王)
  - Lý Mỗ
- Wives
  - Empress Lập Giáo
- Children
  - Lý Phật Mã (李佛瑪)
  - Lý Long Bồ (李龍菩) (?–1069)
  - Lý Lực
  - Lý Cập
  - Lý Phó
  - Lý Nhật Quang (李日㫕) (995–1057)
  - Princess An Quốc
  - Princess Lĩnh Nam (Lý Thị Bảo Hòa)

== Notes ==
1. Chinese historians referred to Lê Long Đĩnh as Lê Chí Trung.
2. The Sino-Vietnamese term for Đào Cam Mộc's occupation is "Chi hậu" (祗候). There are no historical records that clearly explain this position or specify whether it was associated with the military, court hospitality, or events organizing for the royal court. Historical movies like Lý Công Uẩn: Đường tới thành Thăng Long (with Chi hậu Đỗ Thích), and Về đất Thăng Long (with Chi hậu Đào Cam Mộc) portray "Chi hậu" as a lieutenant; however, those movies include many fictional historical events.

Lý Thái Tổ House of Lý Born: 974 Died: 1028
Regnal titles
Preceded by Lê Long Đĩnh	Emperor of Đại Cồ Việt; 1009–1028	Succeeded by Lý Thái Tông
New title	Emperor of the Lý dynasty 1009–1028	Succeeded by Lý Thái Tông
