= Lý Bát Đế Temple =

Coordinates: 21°06′26″N 105°57′37″E

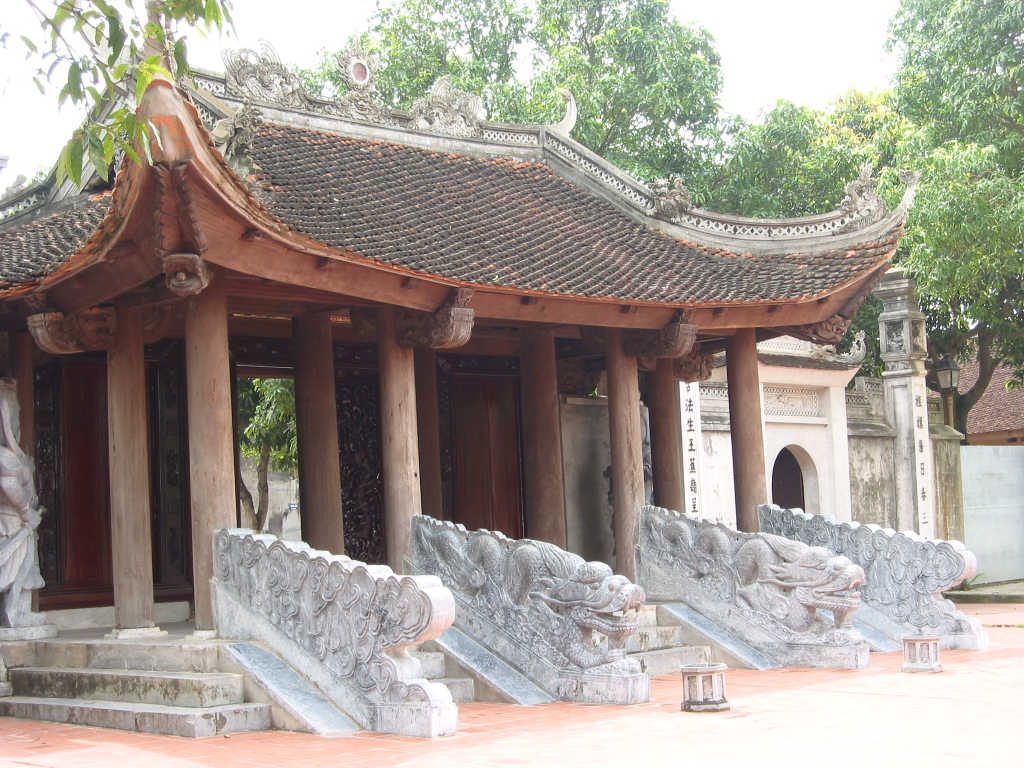
The Five-Dragon Gate into the main hall of Lý Bát Đế Temple.

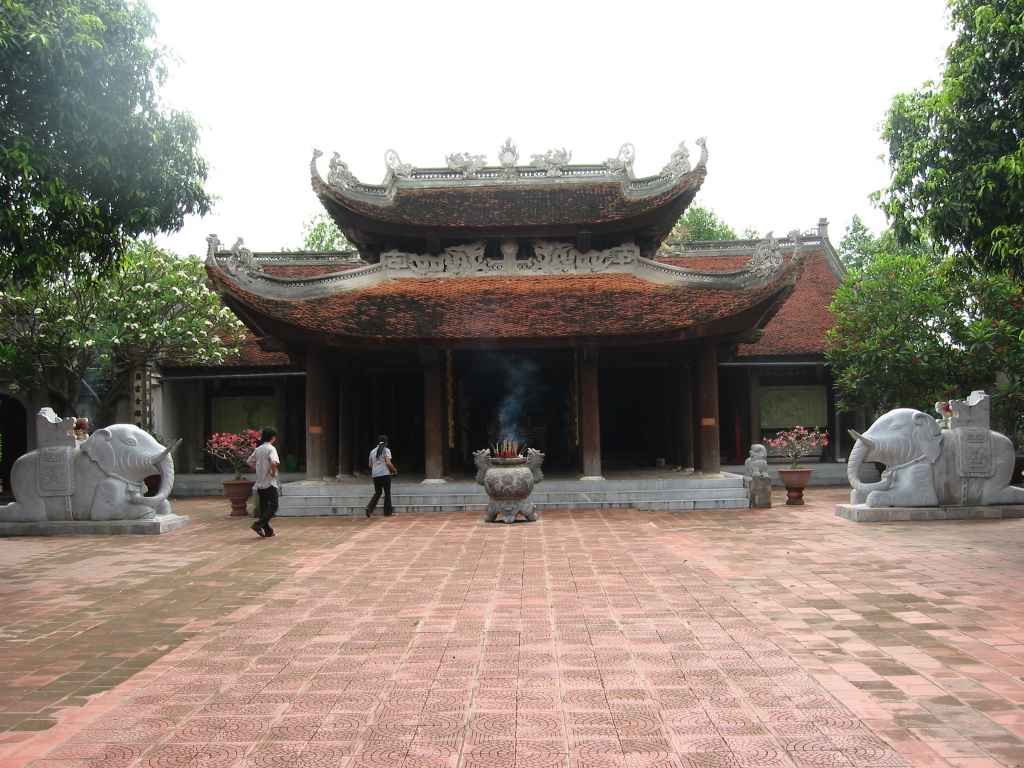
The main hall, Đền Đô, Đô Temple.

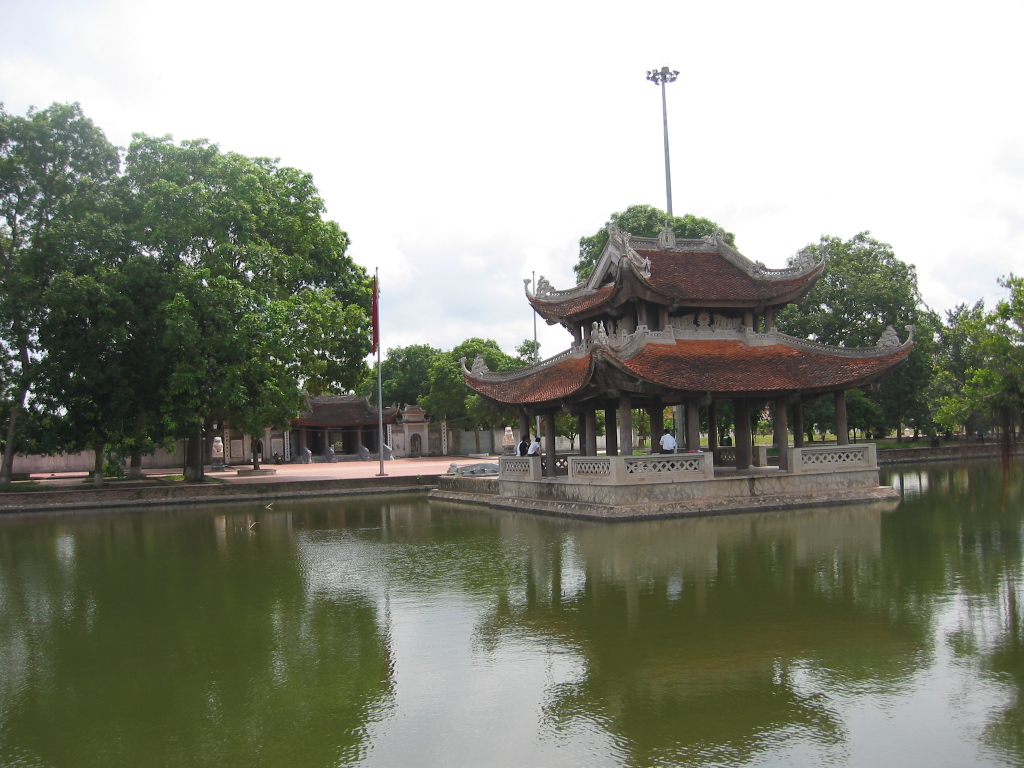
Five Dragon Gate and Water Pavilion

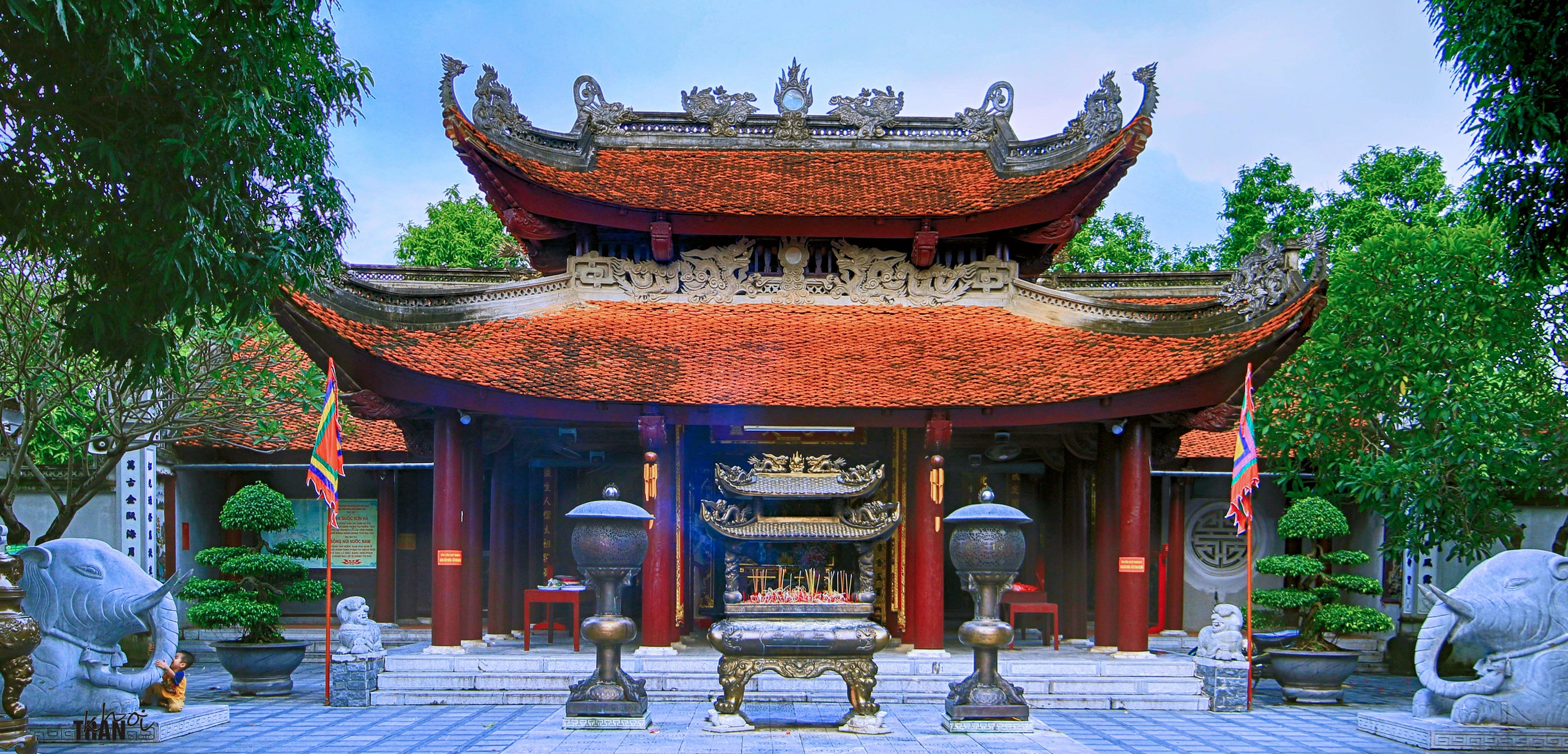

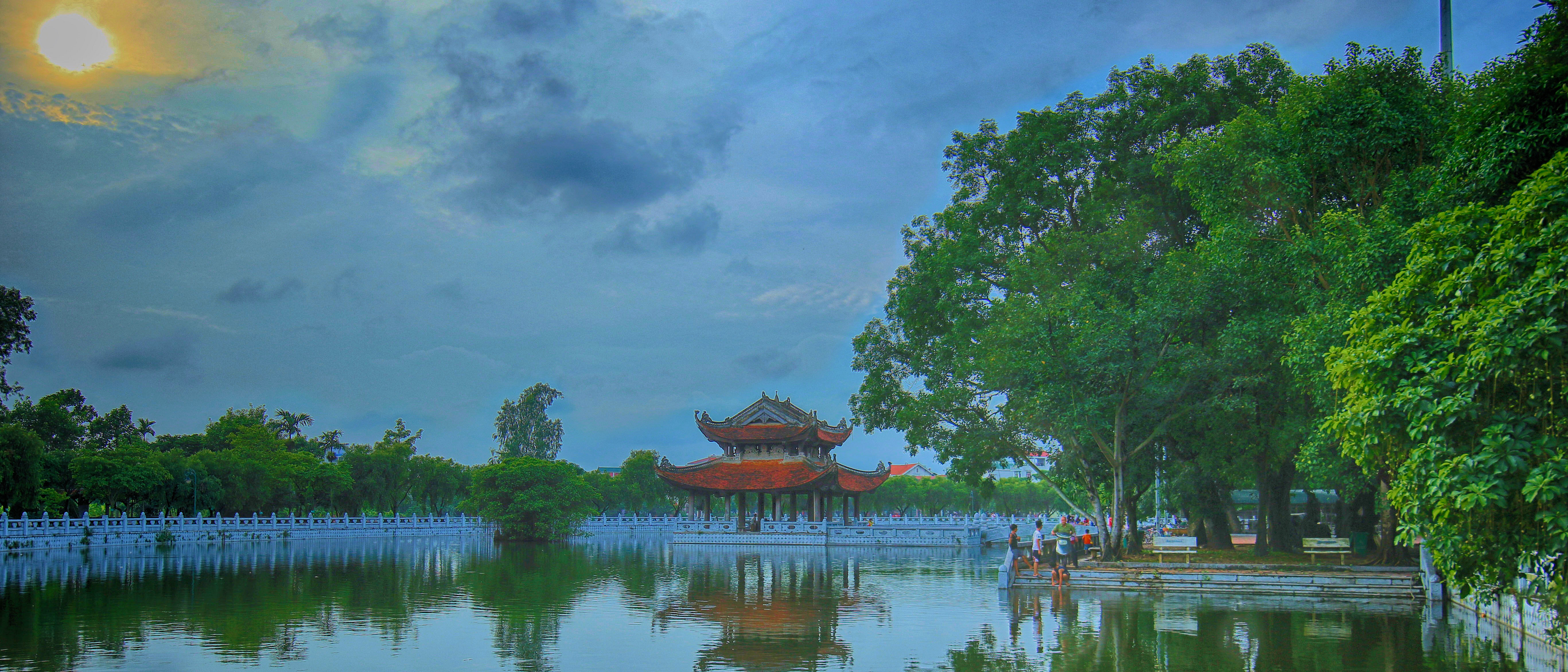

The Lý Bát Đế Temple or Đô Temple (Vietnamese: Đền Lý Bát Đế [ʔɗen˨˩ li˧˦ ʔɓaːt̚˧˦ ʔɗe˧˦] or Đền Đô [ʔɗen˨˩ ʔɗo˧˧]), formal Buddhist name Cổ Pháp Điện, is a temple near Hanoi of which the central section was built in 1028 on the death of Lý Thái Tổ (李太祖), and the complex enlarged as seven of his descendant Lý dynasty emperors were also buried at the shrine – Lý Bát Đế means "Eight Lý Emperors." Traditionally, the shrine serves for ancestor worship of the eight emperors. It is located in Đình Bảng Commune, Từ Sơn District, in the Red River Delta province of Bắc Ninh. Another national monument, Đình Bảng communal house, is adjacent.

== Main hall and side halls ==
The main hall of the shrine is used for the worship of the Lý emperors. The Văn chỉ hall at the right of the main hall is used for the worship of Lý Đạo Thành and Tô Hiến Thành, two high-ranking civil mandarin officers who served the Lý dynasty. The Võ Chỉ Hall at the left of main hall is dedicated to the worship of famous generals Lý Thường Kiệt, Lê Phụng Hiểu and Đào Cam Mộc.

== Water Pavilion and lake ==
Entry into the complex is by the Five Dragon Gate (Ngũ long môn). Immediately after the gate is the Half Moon Lake (hồ bán nguyệt), so called because of its half-moon shape. At the front of the half-moon shaped lake stands a pavilion called Thủy Đình built into the lake which today hosts water puppet plays and quan họ singing.

== Restoration in the 1990s as a national monument ==
Đình Bảng, Từ Sơn native and then president of the Vietnamese Fatherland Front Lê Quang Đạo was one of the government figures instrumental in the restoration of the Đô Temple as a national memorial. Party leaders bow before the altar as acts of national remembrance of the patriotism of the Lý kings, rather than as religious worship.

Reigns of the eight emperors are as follows:

1. Lý Công Uẩn namely Lý Thái Tổ (1009–1028)
2. Lý Thái Tông (1028–1054)
3. Lý Thánh Tông (1054–1072)
4. Lý Nhân Tông (1072–1128)
5. Lý Thần Tông (1128–1138)
6. Lý Anh Tông (1138–1175)
7. Lý Cao Tông (1175–1210)
8. Lý Huệ Tông (1210–1224)

== Gallery ==
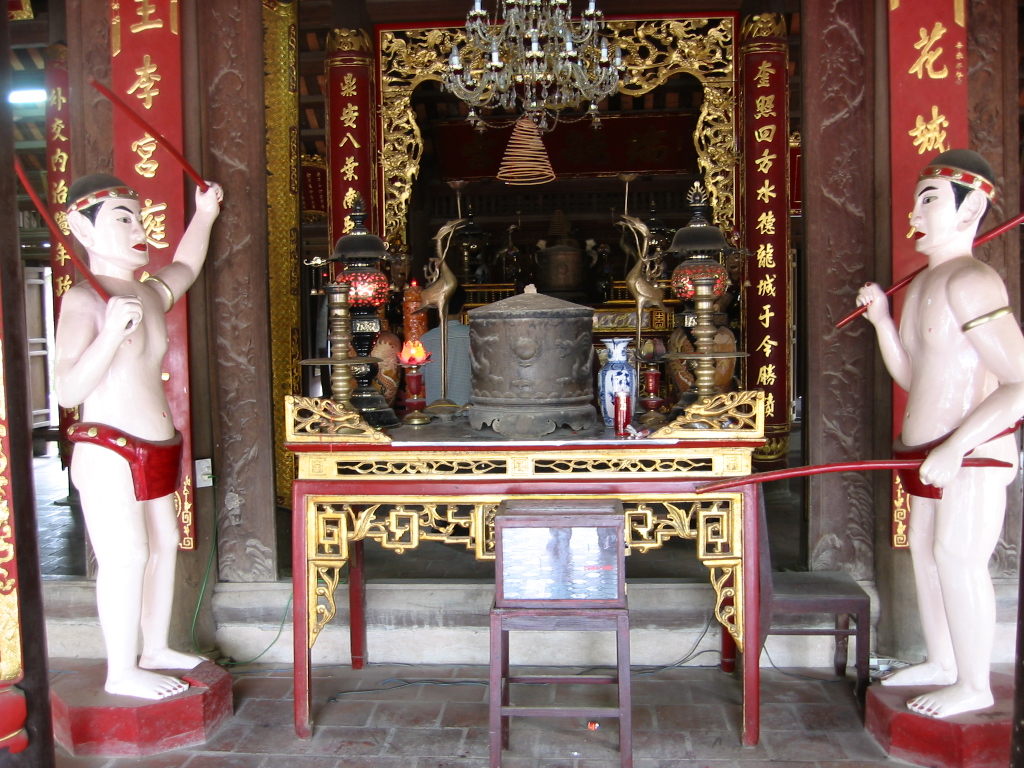
Altar for Lý Công Uẩn (Lý Thái Tổ), the founder of the Lý dynasty.

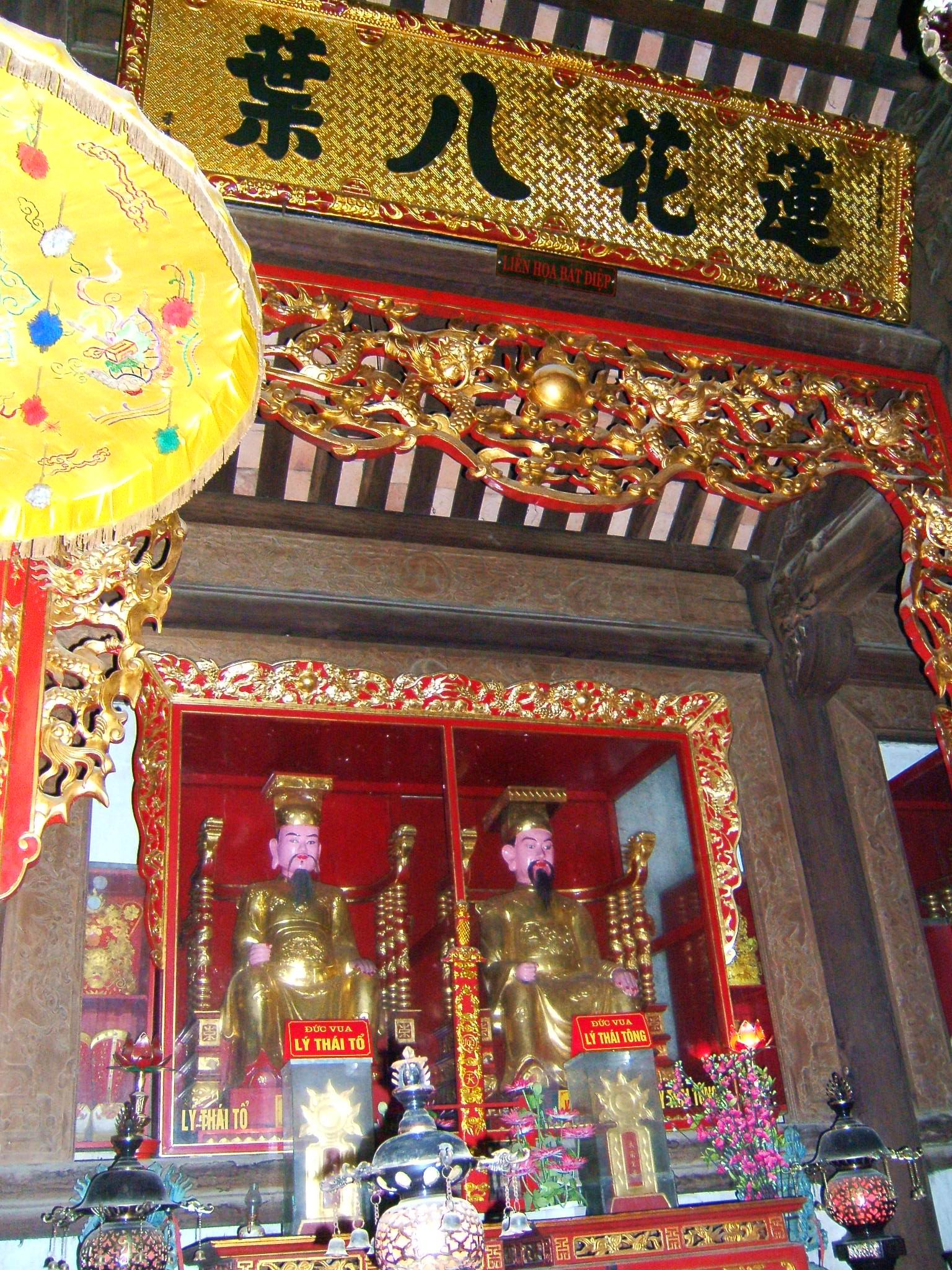
Statues of Lý Thái Tổ and Lý Thái Tông, with superscription "liên hoa bát diệp"

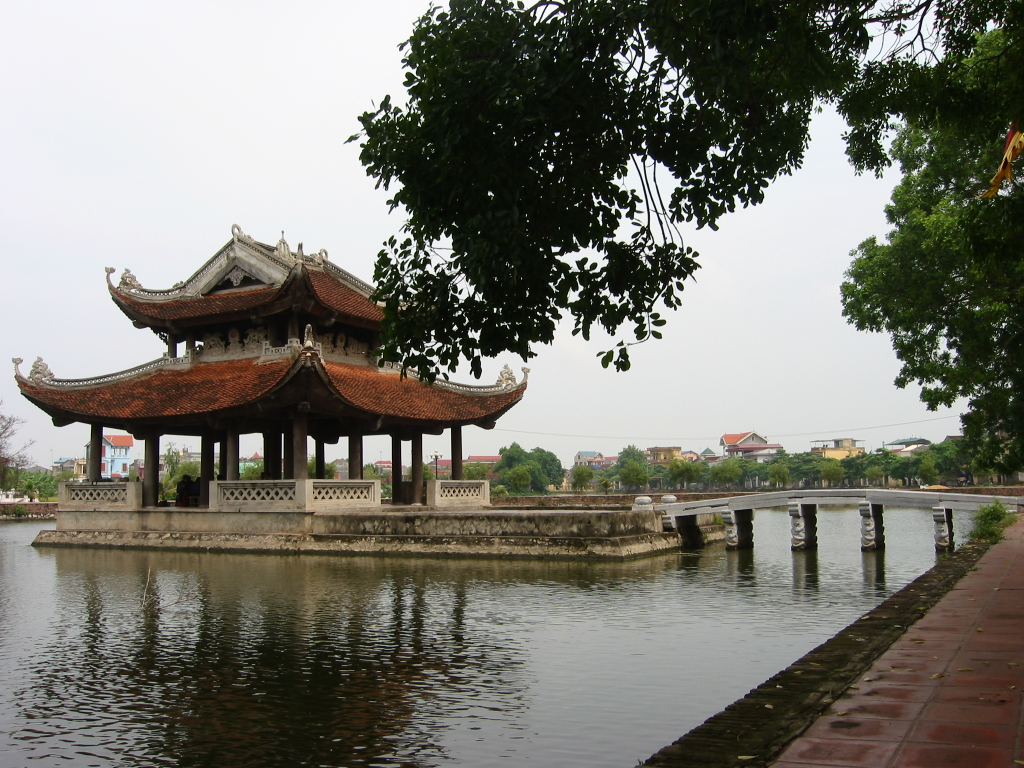
Water pavilion for water puppet shows and quan ho singing
