= Edict on the Transfer of the Capital =

1010 edict to relocate the Vietnamese capital

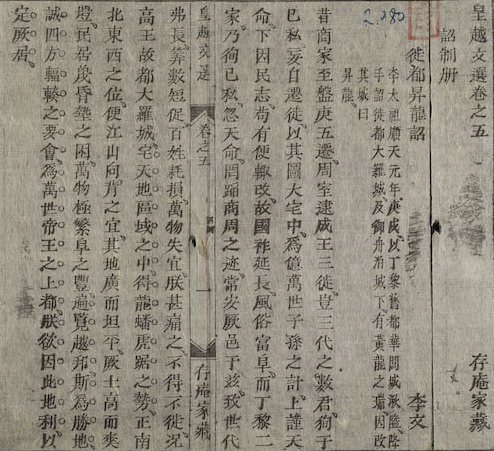
Edict on the Transfer of the Capital in original Hán văn text.

Edict on the Transfer of the Capital (chữ Hán: 遷都詔, chữ Nôm: 詔移都, Vietnamese: Thiên đô chiếu, Chiếu dời đô) is an edict written at the behest of emperor Lý Thái Tổ and issued in the fall of 1010 to transfer the capital of Đại Cồ Việt from Hoa Lư to Đại La.

== History ==
In 968, Vietnam was unified by emperor Đinh Bộ Lĩnh, ending the Anarchy of the 12 Warlords period. He placed the imperial capital in the mountainous Hoa Lư, located in modern-day Ninh Bình province of Vietnam, and Hoa Lư stayed being the capital for about 42 years and developed into a major cultural centre of Vietnam.

In 1005, ruling emperor Lê Hoàn of the Early Lê dynasty died, resulting in a succession dispute between the princes, Lê Long Đĩnh, Lê Long Tích, Lê Long Kính and crown prince Lê Long Việt, preventing a government to take control over the entire country for eight months. Eventually, Lê Long Đĩnh won control of the throne, became the new emperor. As a result of the emperor's poor health, according to some sources, most power was actually controlled by one of the members of the Lý family Lý Công Uẩn. Lê Long Đĩnh's reign only lasted for four years and he died in 1009. After Lê Long Đĩnh died, the court agreed to enthrone the high-rank mandarin and aristocrat Lý Công Uẩn as the new emperor under pressure from the public and from the Buddhist monks, thus ending the Early Lê dynasty.

Realising the difficulty of having the capital in a mountainous region, Lý Thái Tổ (Lý Công Uẩn) and the royal court decided to relocate from Hoa Lư to the site of Đại La (modern-day Hanoi) in the next year, 1010. Đại La was known as the city that the Tang general Gao Pian had built in the 860s after the ravages of the Nanzhao War. In 1010, Lý Công Uẩn published the edict explaining why he move his capital to Dai La. Lý Công Uẩn chose the site because it had been an earlier capital in the rich Red River Delta. He saw Đại La as a place "between Heaven and Earth where the coiling dragon and the crouching tiger lie, and his capital would last 10,000 years". When Lý Công Uẩn's boat docked at the new capital, a dragon, symbol of sovereign authority, reportedly soared above his head; he accordingly renamed the place Thăng Long, the "ascending dragon".

== Documents ==
The Edict on the Transfer of the Capital is of great meaning in many respects. The work has been researched in terms of history, politics, literature, geography, philosophy and so on. The edict was first compiled into the book "the Complete Annals of Đại Việt" (Đại Việt sử ký toàn thư) by historian Ngô Sĩ Liên in the 15th century.

=== Classical Chinese original ===
昔商家至盤庚五遷，周室迨成王三徙。豈三代之數君徇于己私，妄自遷徙。以其圖大宅中，爲億萬世子孫之計，上謹天命，下因民志，苟有便輒改。故國祚延長，風俗富阜。而丁黎二家，乃徇己私，忽天命，罔蹈商周之跡，常安厥邑于茲，致世代弗長，算數短促，百姓耗損，萬物失宜。朕甚痛之，不得不徙。

況高王故都大羅城，宅天地區域之中，得龍蟠虎踞之勢。正南北東西之位，便江山向背之宜。其地廣而坦平，厥土高而爽塏。民居蔑昏墊之困，萬物極繁阜之丰。遍覽越邦，斯爲勝地。誠四方輻輳之要會，爲萬世帝王之上都。

朕欲因此地利以定厥居，卿等如何？

=== Sino-Vietnamese transliteration ===
Tích Thương gia chí Bàn Canh ngũ thiên, Chu thất đãi Thành Vương tam tỉ. Khởi Tam Đại chi sổ quân tuẫn vu kỷ tư, vọng tự thiên tỉ. Dĩ kỳ đồ đại trạch trung, vi ức vạn thế tử tôn chi kế; thượng cẩn thiên mệnh, hạ nhân dân chí, cẩu hữu tiện triếp cải. Cố quốc tộ diên trường, phong tục phú phụ. Nhi Đinh Lê nhị gia, nãi tuẫn kỷ tư, hốt thiên mệnh, võng đạo Thương Chu chi tích, thường an quyết ấp vu tư, trí thế đại phất trường, toán số đoản xúc, bách tính hao tổn, vạn vật thất nghi. Trẫm thậm thống chi, bất đắc bất tỉ.

Huống Cao Vương cố đô Đại La thành, trạch thiên địa khu vực chi trung; đắc long bàn hổ cứ chi thế. Chính Nam Bắc Đông Tây chi vị; tiện giang sơn hướng bội chi nghi. Kỳ địa quảng nhi thản bình, quyết thổ cao nhi sảng khải. Dân cư miệt hôn điếm chi khốn; vạn vật cực phồn phụ chi phong. Biến lãm Việt bang, tư vi thắng địa. Thành tứ phương bức thấu chi yếu hội; vi vạn thế đế vương chi thượng đô.

Trẫm dục nhân thử địa lợi dĩ định quyết cư, khanh đẳng như hà?

=== Vietnamese translation ===
Xưa nhà Thương đến đời Bàn Canh năm lần dời đô, nhà Chu đến đời Thành Vương ba lần dời đô. Há phải các vua thời Tam Đại ấy theo ý riêng tự tiện di dời. Làm như thế cốt để mưu nghiệp lớn, chọn ở chỗ giữa, làm kế cho con cháu muôn vạn đời, trên kính mệnh trời, dưới theo ý dân, nếu có chỗ tiện thì dời đổi, cho nên vận nước lâu dài, phong tục giàu thịnh. Thế mà hai nhà Đinh, Lê lại theo ý riêng, coi thường mệnh trời, không noi theo việc cũ Thương Chu, cứ chịu yên đóng đô nơi đây, đến nỗi thế đại không dài, vận số ngắn ngủi, trăm họ tổn hao, muôn vật không hợp. Trẫm rất đau đớn, không thể không dời.

Huống chi thành Đại La, đô cũ của Cao Vương, ở giữa khu vực trời đất, được thế rồng cuộn hổ ngồi, chính giữa nam bắc đông tây, tiện nghi núi sông sau trước. Vùng này mặt đất rộng mà bằng phẳng, thế đất cao mà sáng sủa, dân cư không khổ thấp trũng tối tăm, muôn vật hết sức tươi tốt phồn thịnh. Xem khắp nước Việt đó là nơi thắng địa, thực là chỗ tụ hội quan yếu của bốn phương, đúng là nơi thượng đô kinh sư mãi muôn đời.

Trẫm muốn nhân địa lợi ấy mà định nơi ở, các khanh nghĩ thế nào?

=== English translation ===
“The Shang dynasty under Pan Geng moved its capital five times, and the Zhou dynasty under king Cheng moved three times. Did these kings of the Three Dynasties move their capitals for personal gain? No, they did so to establish great enterprises, to choose the most central and favorable location, ensuring prosperity for their descendants for ten thousand generations. They respected the Mandate of Heaven above and followed the desires of the people below. Whenever a location proved convenient, they relocated, thus ensuring the long-lasting stability of their dynasties, the prosperity of their lands, and the well-being of their people.

However, the Đinh and Lê dynasties acted differently. They followed their personal preferences, disregarded the will of Heaven, and ignored historical precedents. They remained content in a small, enclosed land, failing to secure long-term peace and prosperity. As a result, their reigns were short-lived, their influence limited, and their people suffered. This causes me great sorrow, and I cannot help but move the capital.

Furthermore, Đại La, the former capital of Gao Pian, is located in the heart of the nation’s territory. It possesses the strategic position of a coiled dragon and crouching tiger, facing the cardinal directions in perfect alignment. The land is vast and flat, elevated and dry, free from flooding and natural disasters. The population is not subjected to hardship, and all living things flourish. Upon surveying the entire nation, no other place compares to this superior land. It is truly the central hub of the four directions, the ideal place for an everlasting imperial capital.

Therefore, I wish to take advantage of this great geographical blessing and establish the new capital here. What do you, my officials, think?”

== See also ==
- Lý dynasty
- Lý Công Uẩn
- Hoa Lư
- Thăng Long
