= Đình Bảng Communal House =

Coordinates: 21°06′29.99″N 105°57′06.31″E

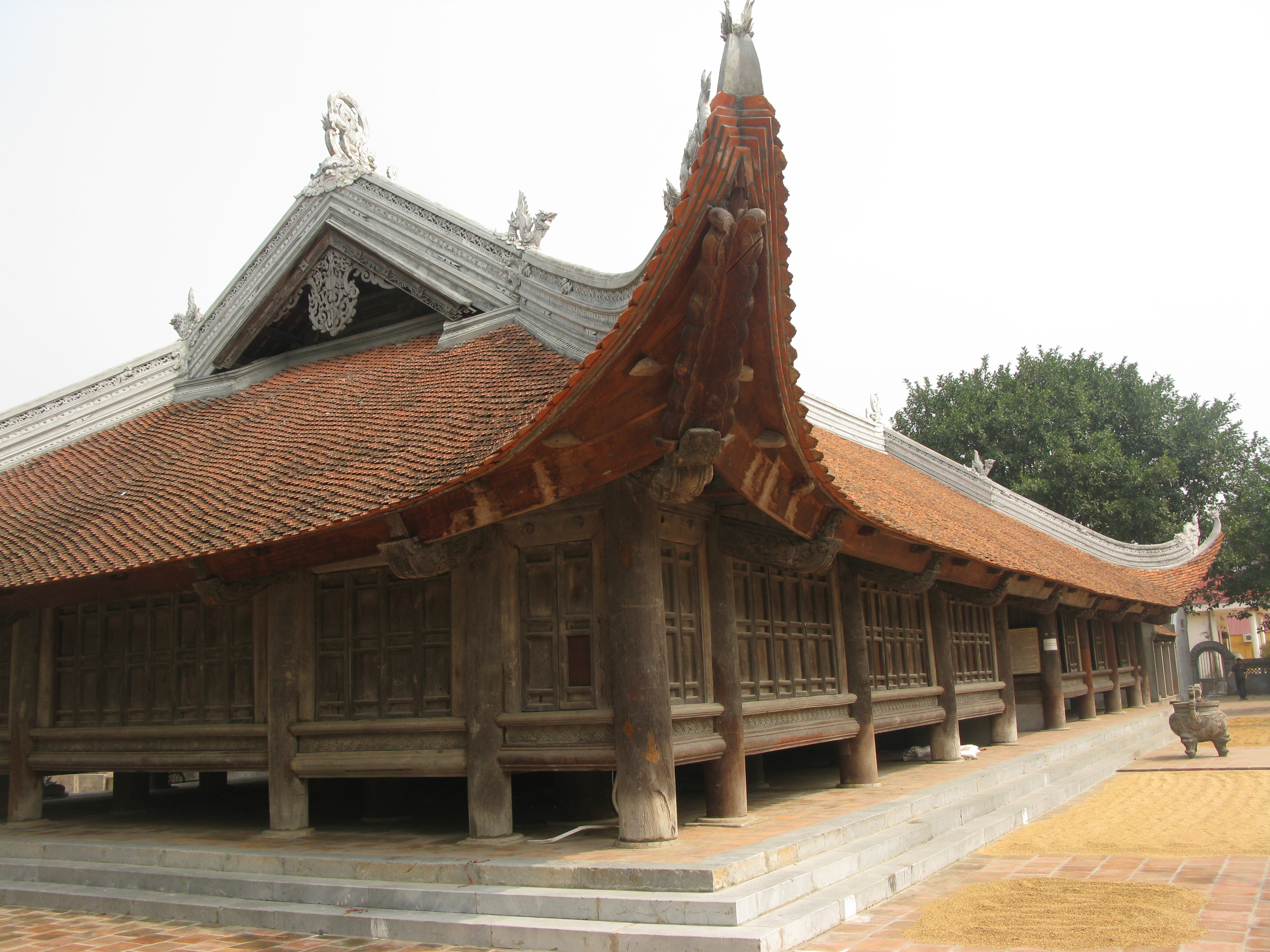
Đình Bảng communal house

Đình Bảng Communal Hall is one of the largest village communal houses in Vietnam. It is located in Đình Bảng village, Từ Sơn district, in Bắc Ninh Province of the Red River Delta, 17 km from the nation's capital, Hanoi.

The construction started in 1700 and was completed 36 years later.

Đình Bảng communal house is used for the worshiping of Cao Sơn Đại vương (Mountain spirit), Thủy Bá Đại vương (Water spirit), and Bạch Lệ Đại vương (God of agriculture), together with the six individuals who rebuilt Đình Bảng village in the 15th century after it was devastated during the Ming occupation (1408–1428). The hall also functions as the village meeting hall and the seat of the local government office.

== References and external links ==
- Sở Văn hóa Hà Bắc (1982), Địa chí Hà Bắc, Ha Bac. (Ha Bac Department of Culture (1982), Monography of Ha Bac, Ha Bac province.)
- The communal house of Đình Bảng village (Vietnamese)
- The communal house of Đình Bảng village (Vietnamese)
