= Vạn Hạnh =

Vietnamese Buddhist monk

Vạn Hạnh (chữ Hán: 禪師萬行, 938–1018) was a Vietnamese Thiền Buddhist monk. He was well known as the most important teacher, protector, and supporter of Lý Thái Tổ, the first emperor of the Lý dynasty.

== See also ==
- Vạn Hạnh Monastery
