= Sushui Jiwen =

The Sushui Jiwen (涑水記聞; "Records of Rumours from Sushui") is a book written by the Song Dynasty historian Sima Guang (1019–1086) in imperial China. While working with Liu Daoyuan (劉道原) and others to compile a never-published Zizhi Tongjian Houji (資治通鑑後記), a book on the Song Dynasty history, Sima Guang collected many miscellaneous anecdotes. While he might have intended to include them in Tongjian Changbian, the "weird" stories became Sushui Jiwen in c. 1180 after his death. The Sushui (涑水; "Su Water") is a small tributary of the Yellow River, and Sima Guang was nicknamed Mr. Sushui (涑水先生) as his hometown of Xia County is on the Sushui. Because the book was compiled by later editors, the number of chapters vary according to the edition: one has 10 chapters, another has 2, and the one in Siku Quanshu has 16 — although many repetitions occur in ch. 9–13.
