= An Nam chí lược =

1335 history of Vietnam to Yuan Empire era

An Nam chí lược 安南志略
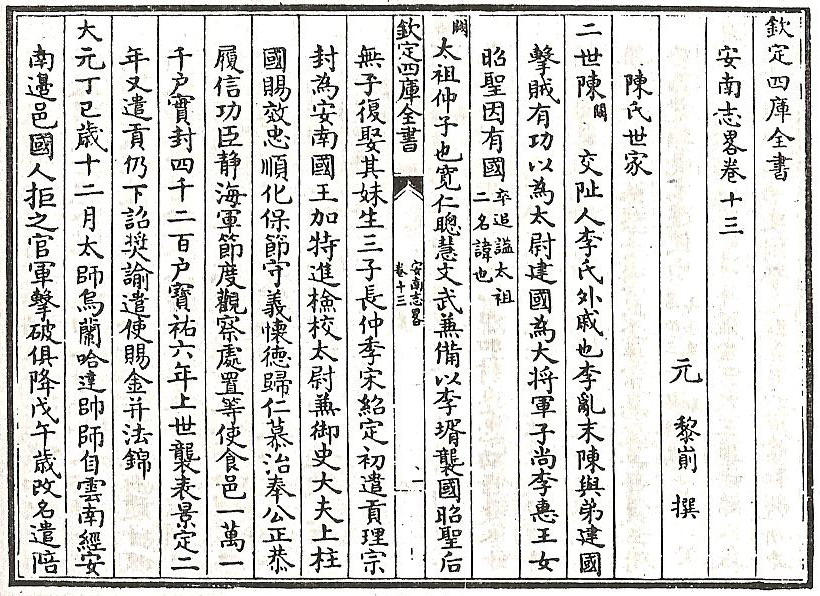
- Copy of An Nam chí lược, in Siku Quanshu
- Original title: 安南志略
- Language: Classical Chinese
- Subject: History of Vietnam, Culture of Vietnam, Geography of Vietnam, Mongol-Vietnamese diplomacy 1257-1291
- Genre: Historiography
- Publisher: Yuan dynasty
- Publication date: 1335
- Publication place: Đại Việt

The An Nam chí lược (安南志略; lit. Abbreviated Records of An Nam) is a historical text that was compiled by the Vietnamese historian Lê Tắc during his exile in Yuan China in the early 14th century. First published in 1335, An Nam chí lược became one of the few historical books about Đại Việt that survived from the 14th and 15th centuries, and it is considered the oldest historical work by a Vietnamese that has been preserved.

== History of compilation ==
Lê Tắc (or Lê Trắc) was an advisor of the Marquis Chương Hiến Trần Kiện who was the son of Prince Tĩnh Quốc Trần Quốc Khang and grandson of the emperor Trần Thái Tông. During the 1285 invasion of Đại Việt by the Yuan dynasty, Trần Kiện surrendered to Kublai Khan's prince Toghan, but he was killed before he could flee to the northern border. As a subordinate of Trần Kiện, Lê Tắc followed his master to China, he survived the ambush that killed Trần Kiện and afterwards lived in exile in the town of Hanyang, Hubei. During his exile in Hanyang, Lê Tắc compiled the An Nam chí lược to recite the history, geography and culture of Đại Việt. A study shows that Lê Tắc wrote his work around the period from 1285 to 1307 and continuously supplemented until 1339, from the foreword of Lê Tắc, one knows that An Nam chí lược was published for the first time in 1335 during the reign of the Emperor Huizong of Yuan, it was subsequently published in the library Siku Quanshu of the Qing dynasty. During the reign of the Ming dynasty, an author also based on An Nam chí lược to write an extensive records about Vietnam named Việt Kiệu thư.

During the Fourth Chinese domination, many valuable books of Đại Việt were taken away by the Ming dynasty and subsequently were lost. Hence the An Nam chí lược became one of the few historical books about Đại Việt that survived from the 14th and 15th centuries and it is considered the oldest historical work compiled by a Vietnamese that has been preserved. Only in early 20th century, the book was brought back to Vietnam through a version that was printed in Japan in 1884, An Nam chí lược was translated into Vietnamese in 1961.

== Description ==
In An Nam chí lược, Lê Tắc recounted the history and other aspects of his country Đại Việt from its beginning to the reign of the Trần dynasty. The title of the book literally means Abbreviated Records of An Nam with An Nam (Pacified South) was the Chinese name for Vietnam during the Tang dynasty, thus An Nam chí lược was written with a Chinese bias. The contents of An Nam chí lược are arranged in 20 chapters (quyển), except for details dating from Lê Tắc's lifetime, An Nam chí lược is derived almost entirely from Chinese accounts and contains some records that cannot be found elsewhere. Today 19 chapters are preserved in the original form except the 20th chapter named Danh công đề vịnh An Nam chí that was lost.

According to Keith Weller Taylor in his The Birth of Vietnam, although Lê Tắc wrote his work in China, the An Nam chí lược still reflects his Vietnamese root and thoughts that result in some materials about "rebels" of Chinese authority which one would not expect from a Chinese historian. For example, An Nam chí lược is the earliest surviving historical book to mention Lady Triệu who led a rebellion against the kingdom of Eastern Wu in the 3rd century. Besides the historical accounts, An Nam chí lược also contains valuable information about the geography, tradition and culture of Vietnam such as the influence of Taoism in Đại Việt. The oldest records about the activities of Đại Việt people from the ancient time to the Trần dynasty are found in the first chapter of the An Nam chí lược, by his own experiences, Lê Tắc made a detailed description about the Vietnamese tradition of singing, dancing and musical instruments. From this account, it is known that the Vietnamese people have an old tradition of creating songs in the native language together with tunes in Chinese.

== Table of contents ==
Chapter (Quyển)	Title	Contents	Notes
01	General	General information about Đại Việt, administrative divisions, geography, legends and traditions	
02	"Đại Nguyên chiếu chế" (大元詔制)	Edicts, proclamations and other formal documents of the Yuan dynasty and former Chinese dynasties to rulers of Đại Việt	
03	"Đại Nguyên phụng sứ" (大元奉使)	Records about Vietnamese ambassadors to China and Chinese envoys to Vietnam	
04	"Chính thảo vận hướng" (征討運餉)	Brief accounts about conflicts and wars between the two countries	
05	"Đại Nguyên danh thần vãng phục thơ vấn" (大元名臣往復書問)	Letters of mandarins of the Yuan dynasty and former Chinese dynasties to Đại Việt or related to the country	
06	"Biểu chương" (表章)	Petitions and letters of Vietnamese rulers to Chinese authorities	
07	"Thứ sử, thái thú Giao Châu, Cửu Chân, Nhật Nam và thứ sử, thái thú đời Tam Quốc" (漢交州九真日南刺史太守)	Records about Chinese governors of the Han dynasty and Eastern Wu in Vietnam during the First Chinese domination	
08	"Đô đốc, thứ sử Giao Châu, thái thú Giao Chỉ, Cửu Chân, Nhật Nam thời Lục triều" (六朝交州刺史都督交趾九真日南太守)	Records about Chinese governors of the Six Dynasties in Vietnam during the Second Chinese domination	
09	"Đô đốc, đô hộ, kinh lược sứ An Nam, thứ sử Giao, Ái, Hoan thời nhà Đường" (唐安南都督都護經略使交愛驩三郡刺史)	Records about Chinese governors of the Tang dynasty in Vietnam during the Third Chinese domination	
10	"Những người tôi các đời trước sang ký ngụ" (歷代覊臣)	Records about other Chinese mandarins in Vietnam	
11	"Gia thế họ Triệu" (趙氏世家)	Records about Vietnamese rulers from the Triệu dynasty, Khúc family, Ngô dynasty to the Đinh dynasty and Early Lê dynasty	
12	"Gia thế họ Lý" (李氏世家)	Records about the Lý dynasty	
13	"Gia thế họ Trần" (陳氏世家)	Records about the Trần dynasty from Trần Thừa to Trần Minh Tông with supplemental accounts about Trần Ích Tắc, Trần Tú Viên, Trần Văn Lộng and Trần Kiện	
14	Administrative information	Records about the administrative system, education, military organization and Vietnamese ambassadors to China	
15	"Nhân vật" (人物)	Records about notable figures in history of Vietnam, supplemental accounts about Vietnamese specialities	
16	"Tạp ký" (雜記)	Various remarks about Vietnam and recitation of famous poems	
17	"Thơ của các danh nhân đi sứ An Nam" (至元以來名賢奉使安南詩)	Poems of Chinese envoys to Vietnam and poems or letters of Vietnamese scholars for Chinese envoys	
18	"Thơ của danh nhân An Nam" (安南名人詩)	Poems of prominent Vietnamese authors	
19	"Đồ chí ca" (圖志歌)	Summary of history of Vietnam by a poem	
