= Cúc Phương =

- Commune
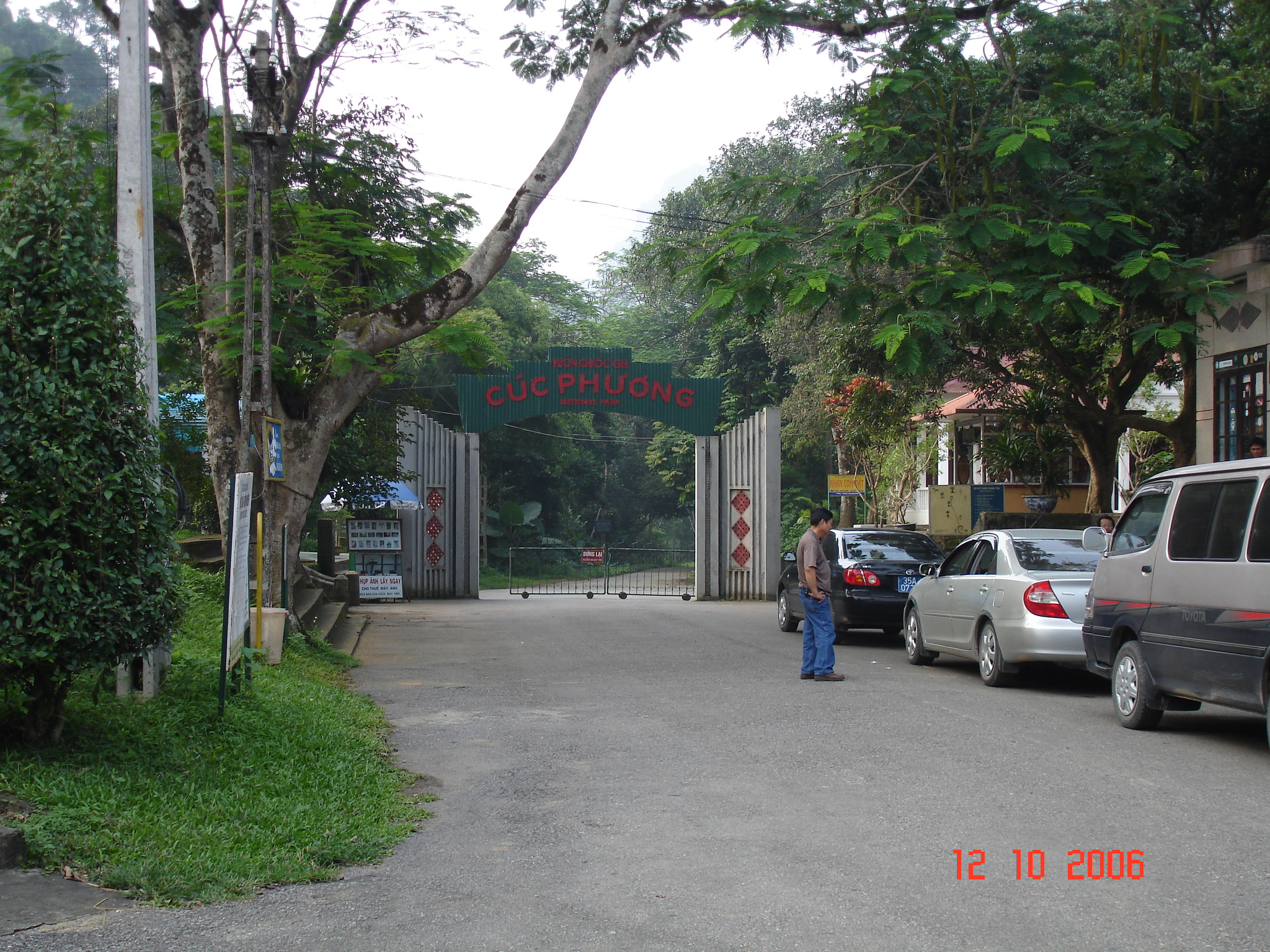
- Cúc Phương forest
- Interactive map of Cúc Phương
- Coordinates: 20.240850500011902°N 105.71938125871141°E
- Country: Vietnam
- Region: Red River Delta
- Province: Ninh Bình
- Established: 22 July 1964
- Administrative headquarters: Nga Hamlet

Area
  - Total: 132.68 km^{2} (51.23 sq mi)

Population (2025)
  - Total: 8,650
  - Density: 65/km^{2} (170/sq mi)
- Postal code: 08429
- Website: cucphuong.ninhbinh.gov.vn

Cúc Phương is a commune in Ninh Bình province, Vietnam. It is the largest commune in the province by area, with most of Cúc Phương National Park located within the commune.

== History ==
Cúc Phương Commune was established on 22 July 1964.

On 12 June 2025, the National Assembly of Vietnam adopted Resolution No. 202/2025/QH15 on the reorganization of provincial-level administrative units, which merged Hà Nam province and Nam Định province into Ninh Bình province.

On 16 June 2025, the National Assembly of Vietnam adopted Resolution No. 203/2025/QH15 amending and supplementing several articles of the Constitution of Vietnam, which provided for the termination of district-level administrative units nationwide from 1 July 2025.

On the same date, the Standing Committee of the National Assembly of Vietnam issued Resolution No. 1674/NQ-UBTVQH15 on the arrangement of commune-level administrative units in Ninh Bình province in 2025. Under the resolution, the entire area and population of Cúc Phương and Văn Phương communes, formerly part of Nho Quan district, were merged to form a new commune named Cúc Phương.
