= Bái Đính Pagoda =

Buddhist pagoda complex in Vietnam

Coordinates: 20°16′37″N 105°51′46″E

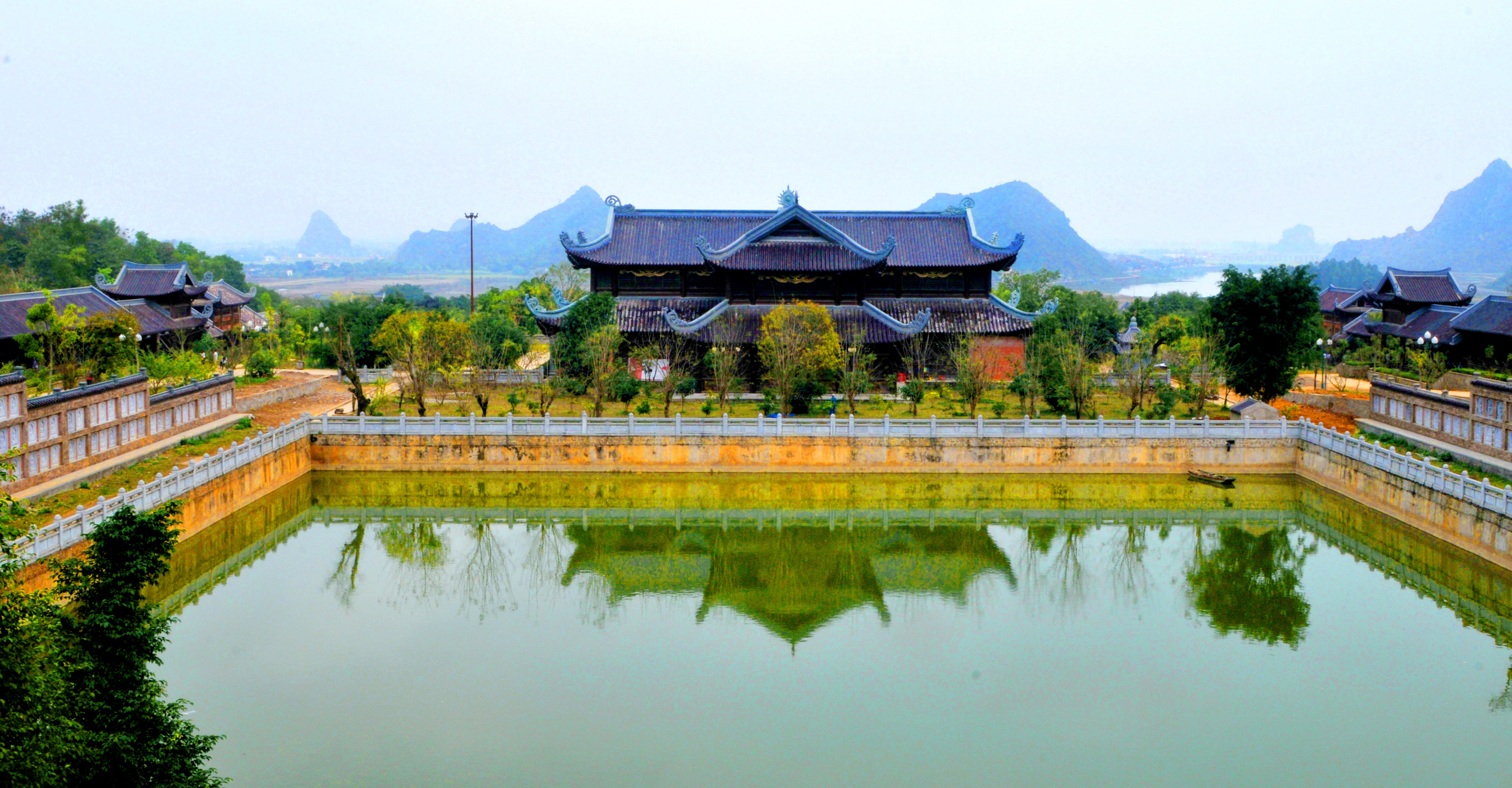
A corner of Bái Đính Pagoda

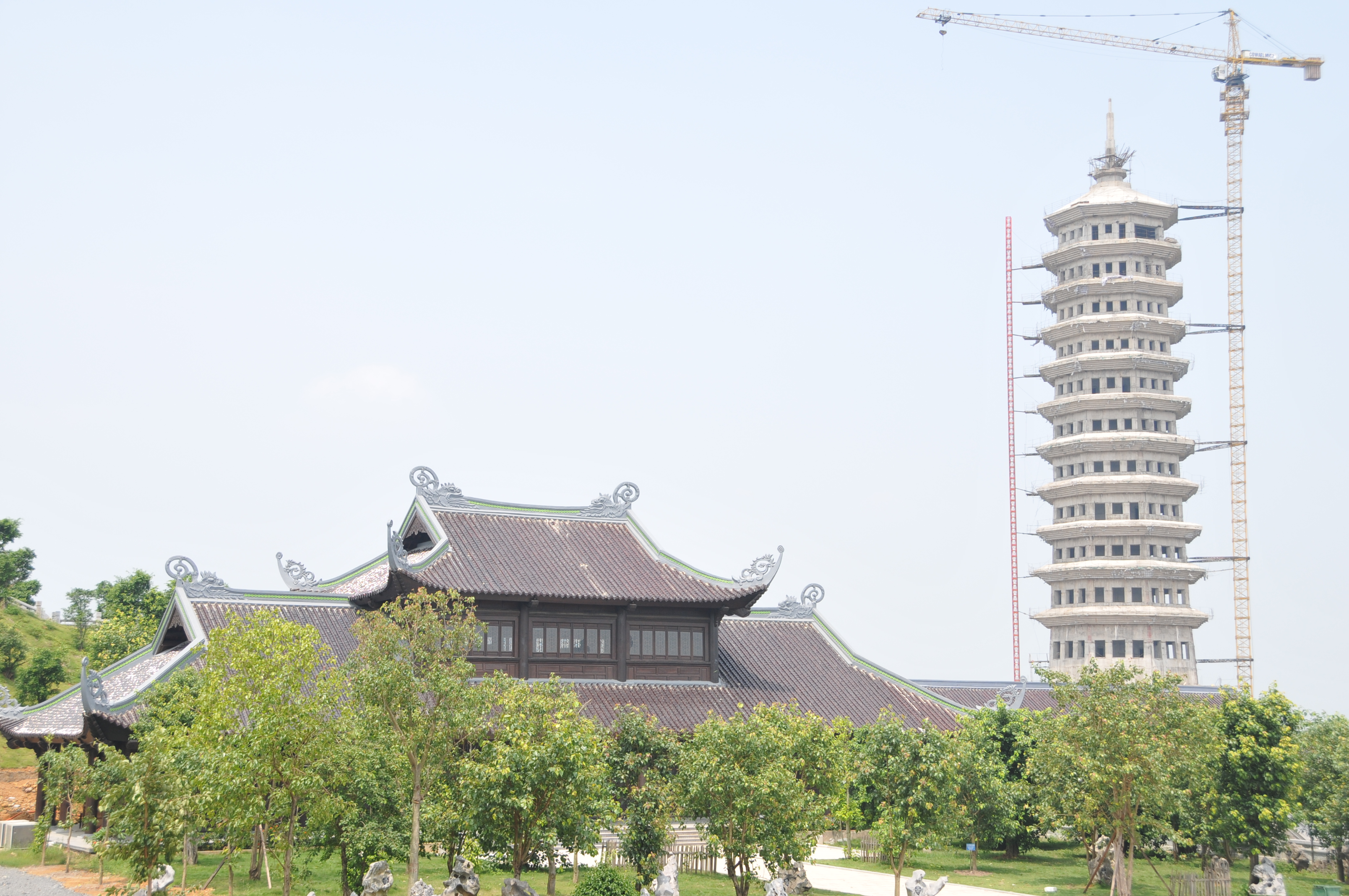
Bái Đính Pagoda

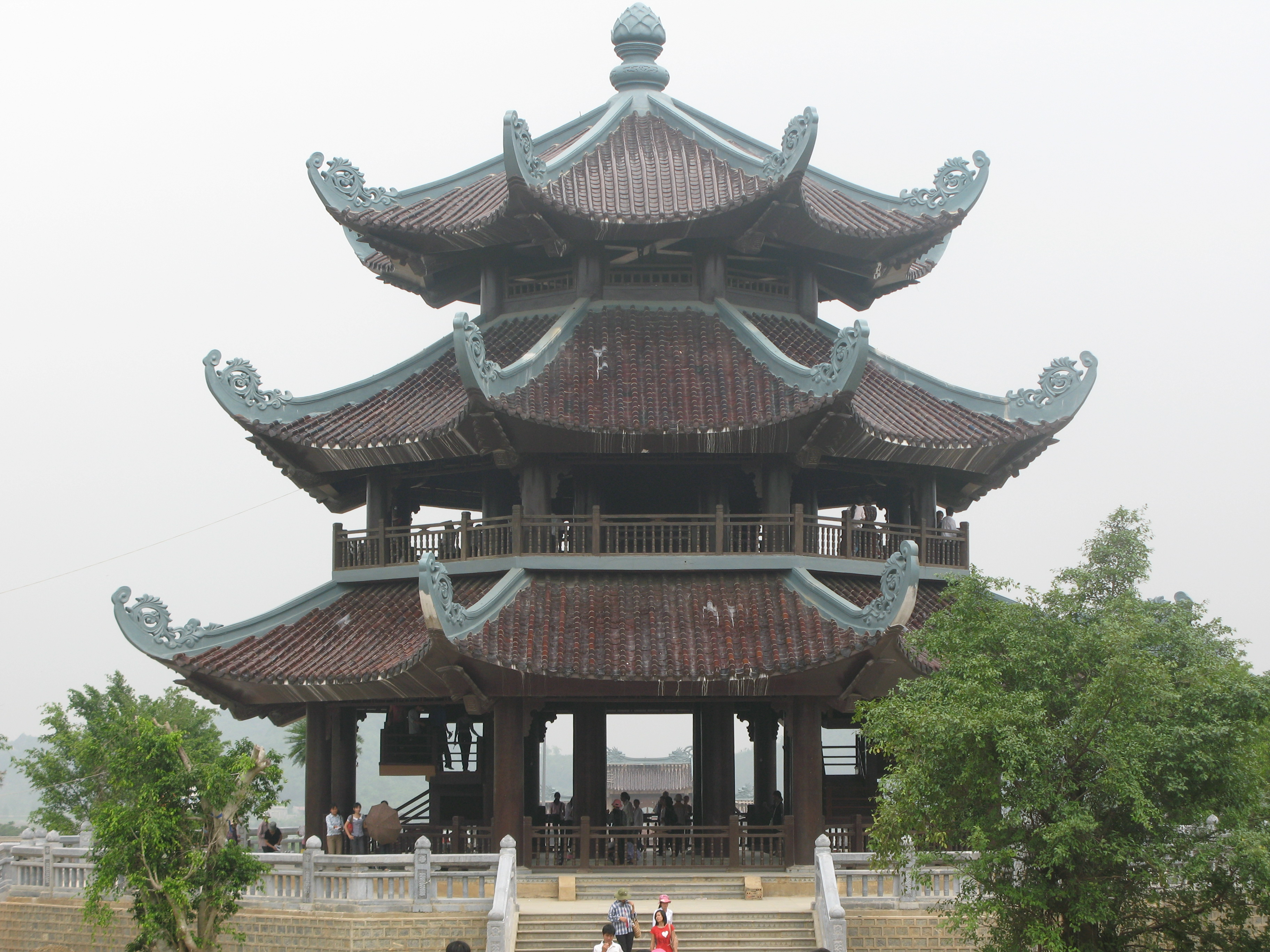
The 22m-tall Bell Tower of Bái Đính

Bái Đính Pagoda (Vietnamese: Chùa Bái Đính, Chữ Hán: 沛嵿寺) or Bái Đính Pagoda Spiritual and Cultural Complex is a complex of Buddhist temples on Bái Đính Mountain in Gia Viễn District, Ninh Bình Province, Vietnam. The compound consists of the original old temple and a newly created larger temple. It is considered one of the largest Buddhist temples in Vietnam (along with Tam Chuc Pagoda) and has become a popular site for Buddhist pilgrimages from across Vietnam.

Bái Đính Pagoda, along with Phát Diệm Cathedral, Hoa Lư Ancient Capital Tam Cốc-Bích Động, Tràng An, Cúc Phương is a famous tourist attraction site of Ninh Bình Province.

== New complex ==
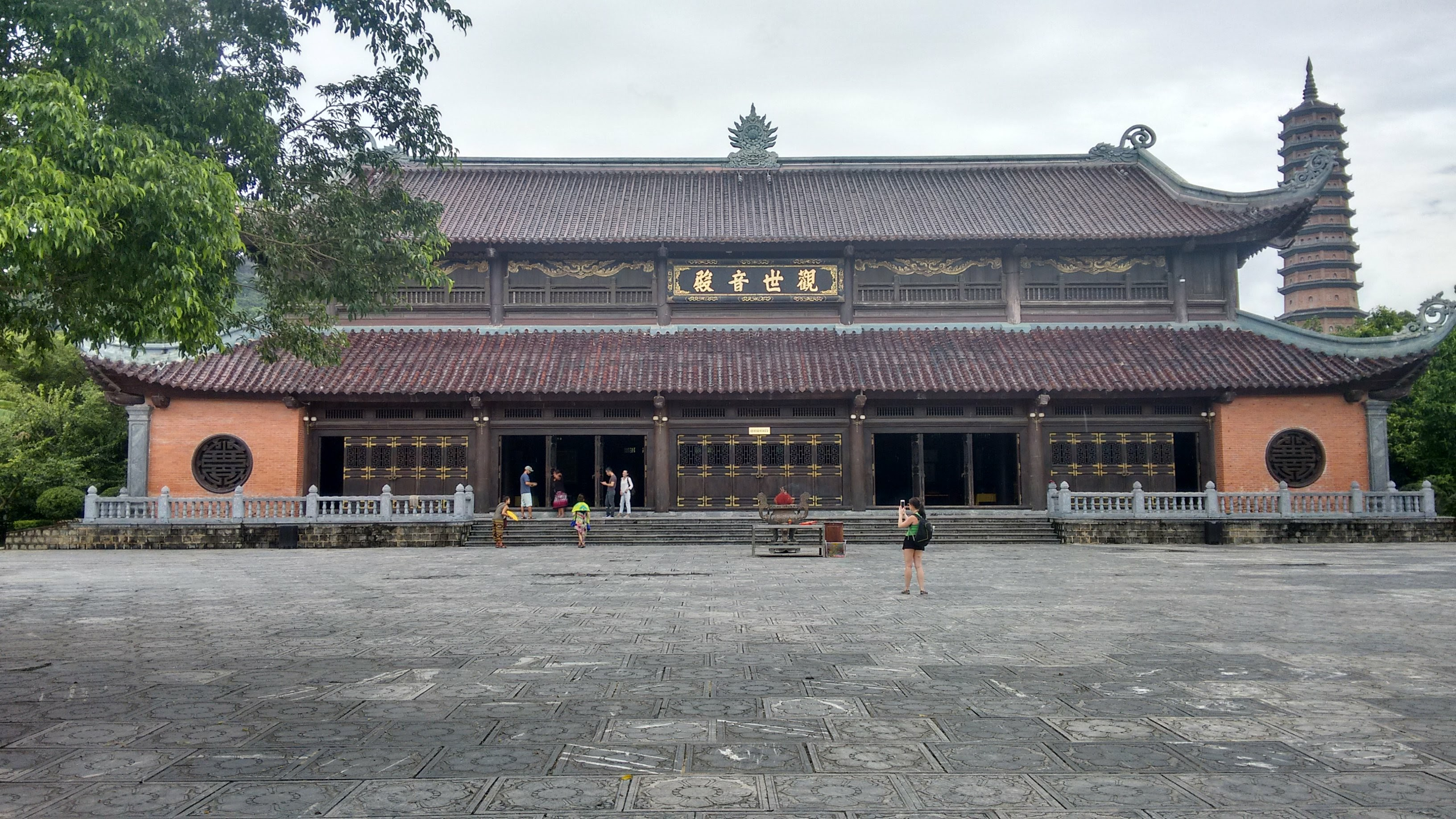
A shrine in Bái Đính Pagoda

The New Bai Đính Pagoda (Bái Đính Tân Tự) encompasses an area of 700 hectares, located on Ba Rau hills, near the Hoàng Long River. This is a large complex which includes many structures built over several phases starting in 2003 and finally completed in 2010. The temple's architecture follows traditional lines, consisting of large halls, courtyards and enclosures. The huge scale of Bai Dinh makes it strikingly different from previously built Vietnamese Buddhist pagodas, however. The largest structure, the Tam Thế Hall, rises to 34 m at its roof ridge and measures over 59 m in length. The construction materials include locally quarried stone and timber from Ninh Bình and tiles from Bát Tràng (reinforced concrete was also employed owing to the scale of construction). The temple adheres to traditional Vietnamese design aesthetics with its curve finials and corner eaves soaring outward and upward, resembling a phoenix's tail. Artisanal works from local handicraft villages were selected for the interior, with bronze sculptures from Ý Yên, stone carvings from Ninh Van, wood carpentry from Phú Lộc, and embroidery from Ninh Hải.

== Old temple ==
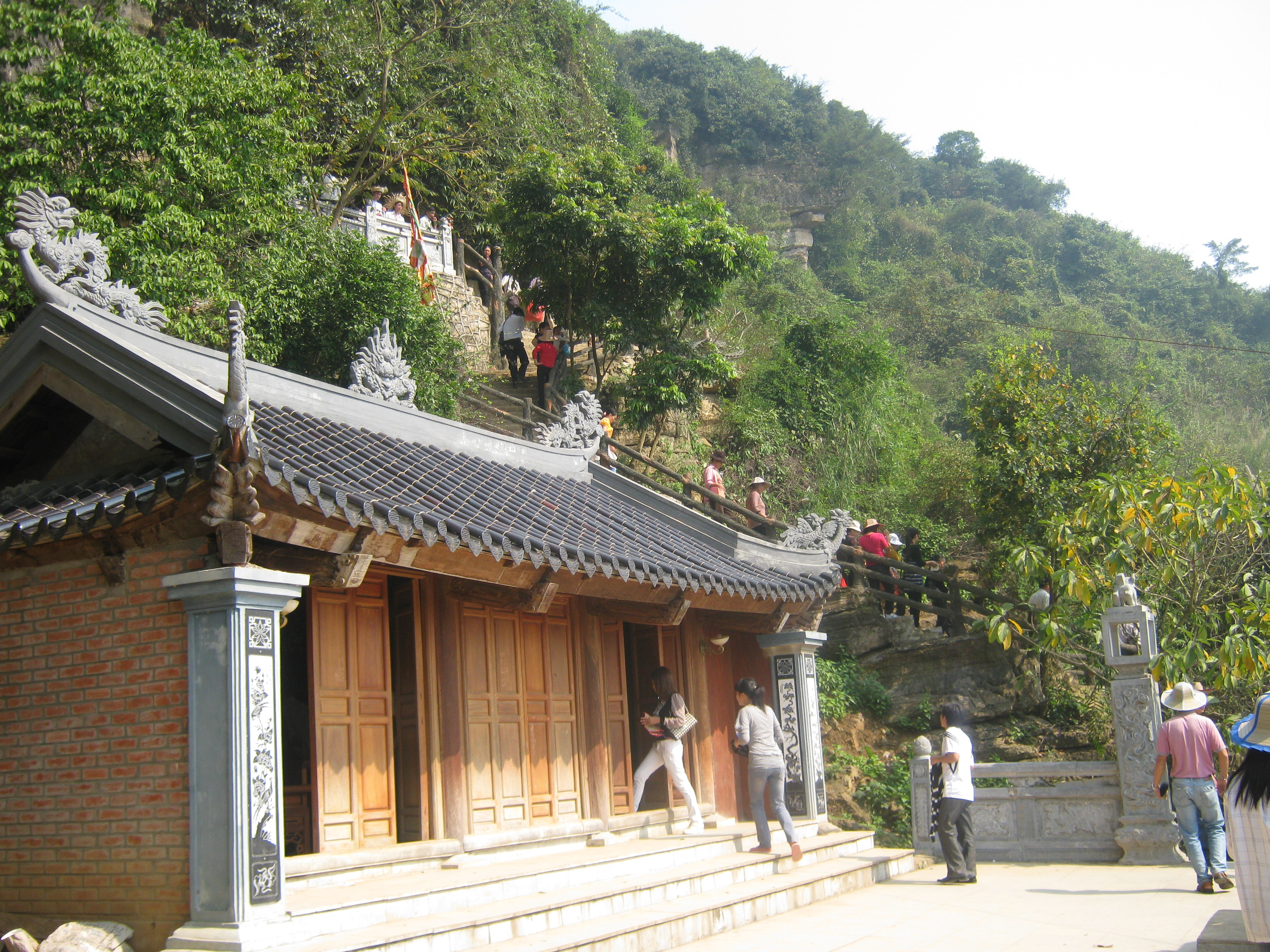
Old temple after being restored

The original Bái Đính pagoda is located in the foothills some 800 meters from the new temple. Ascending a series of over 300 stone steps, the path passes under an ornamental gate to reach the entrance. The temple itself is located in a series of small caves on the mountainside. Along with Buddhist deities, natural spirits of the mountains are also venerated.

== Bái Đính Pagoda festival ==
Bái Đính pagoda hosts a large festival on the sixth day of the first lunar month drawing huge crowds. Buddhist rites are performed in the New Temple in conjunction with traditional rituals from the Old Temple.

== Records of Vietnam ==
The temple covers an area of 539ha, including 27ha ancient pagoda area, 80ha new pagoda area. Bái Đính is holding many records of Vietnam, Southeast Asia, or even Asia. These include the largest bronze bell in Vietnam, a corridor featuring 500 Arhat statues, the tallest Buddhist stupa in Asia, and one of the largest Buddhist temple complexes in Vietnam.

== Photos of Bái Đính Pagoda ==
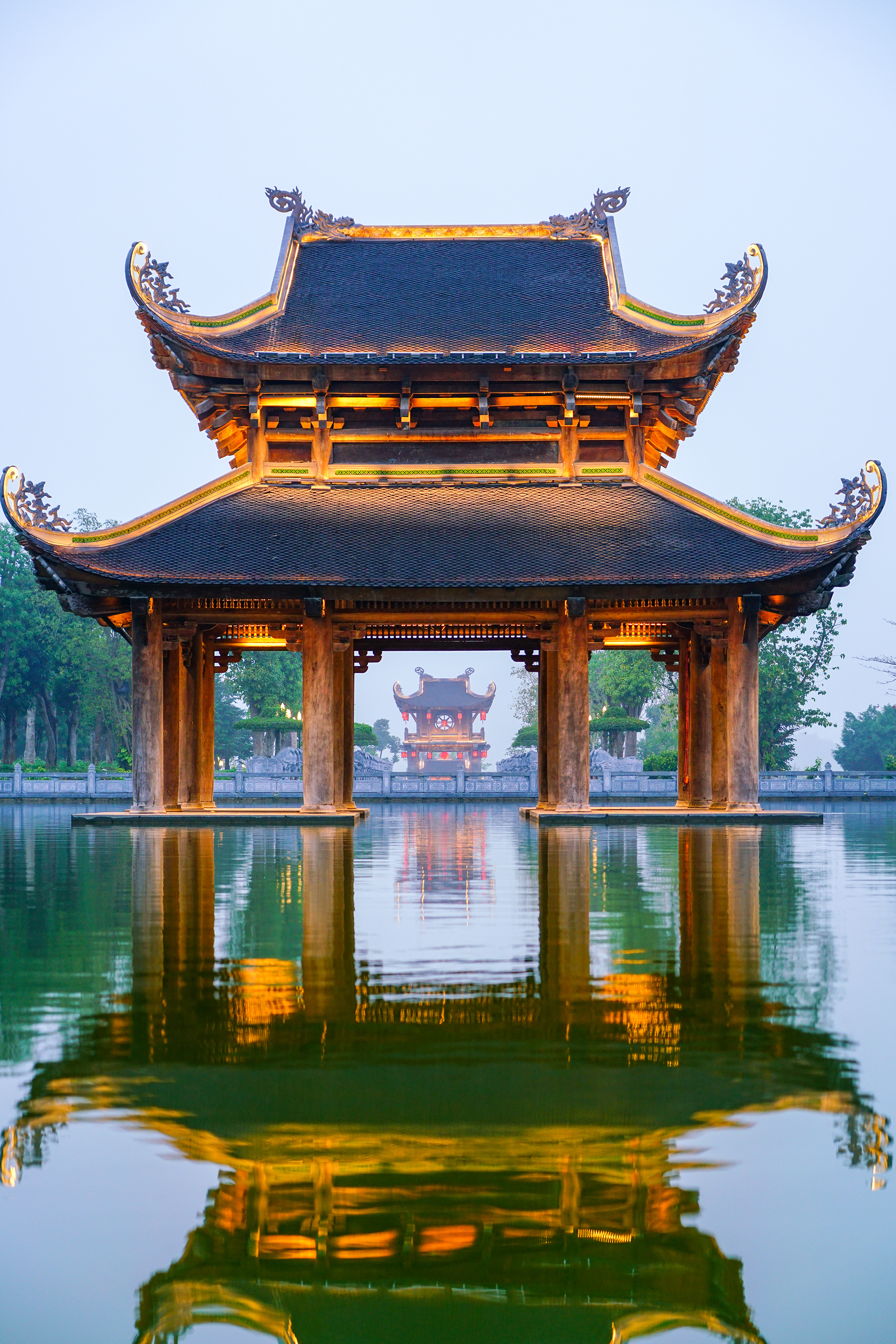
Thủy đình at Bái Đính pagoda complex

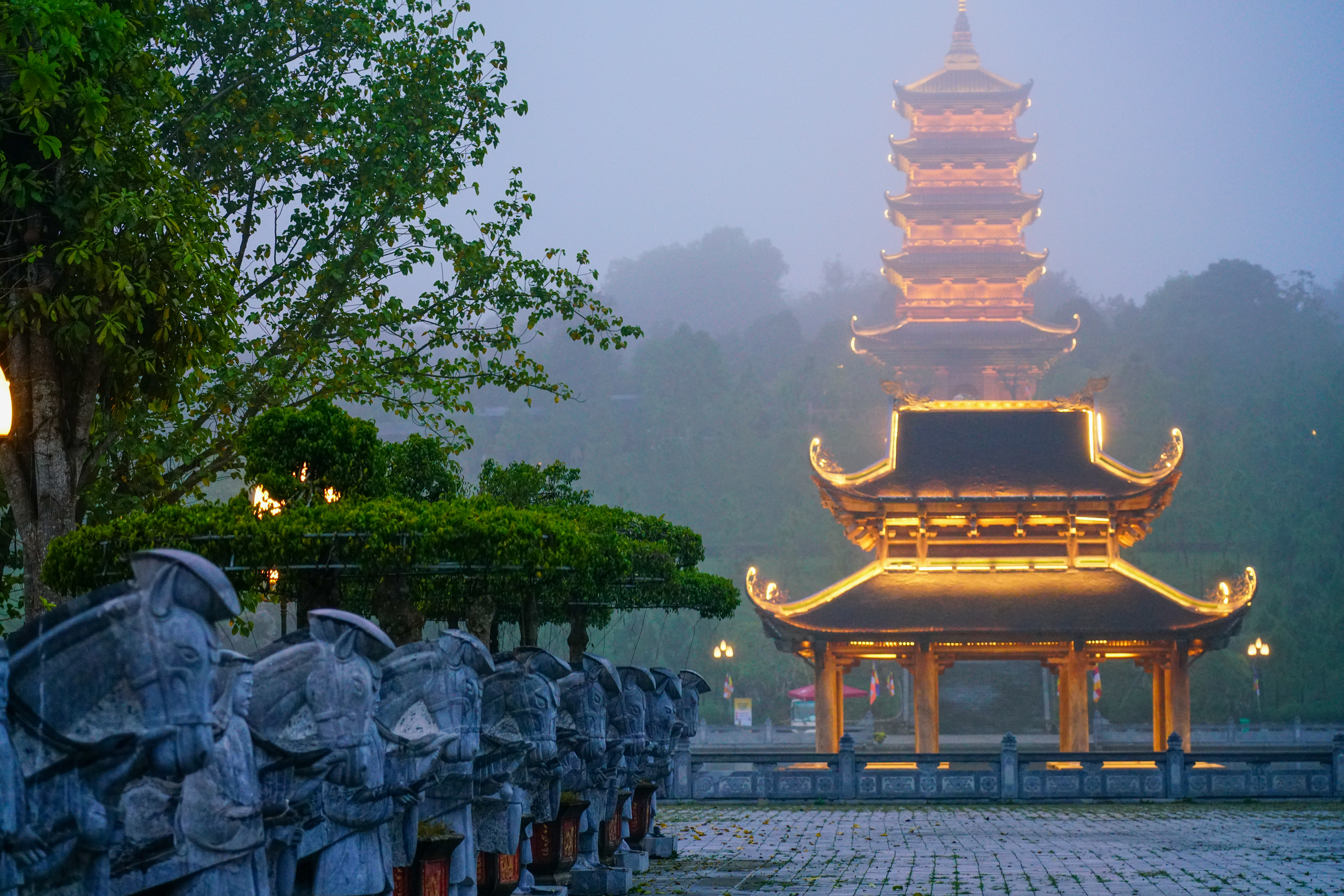
Temples and pagoda at Bai Dinh complex

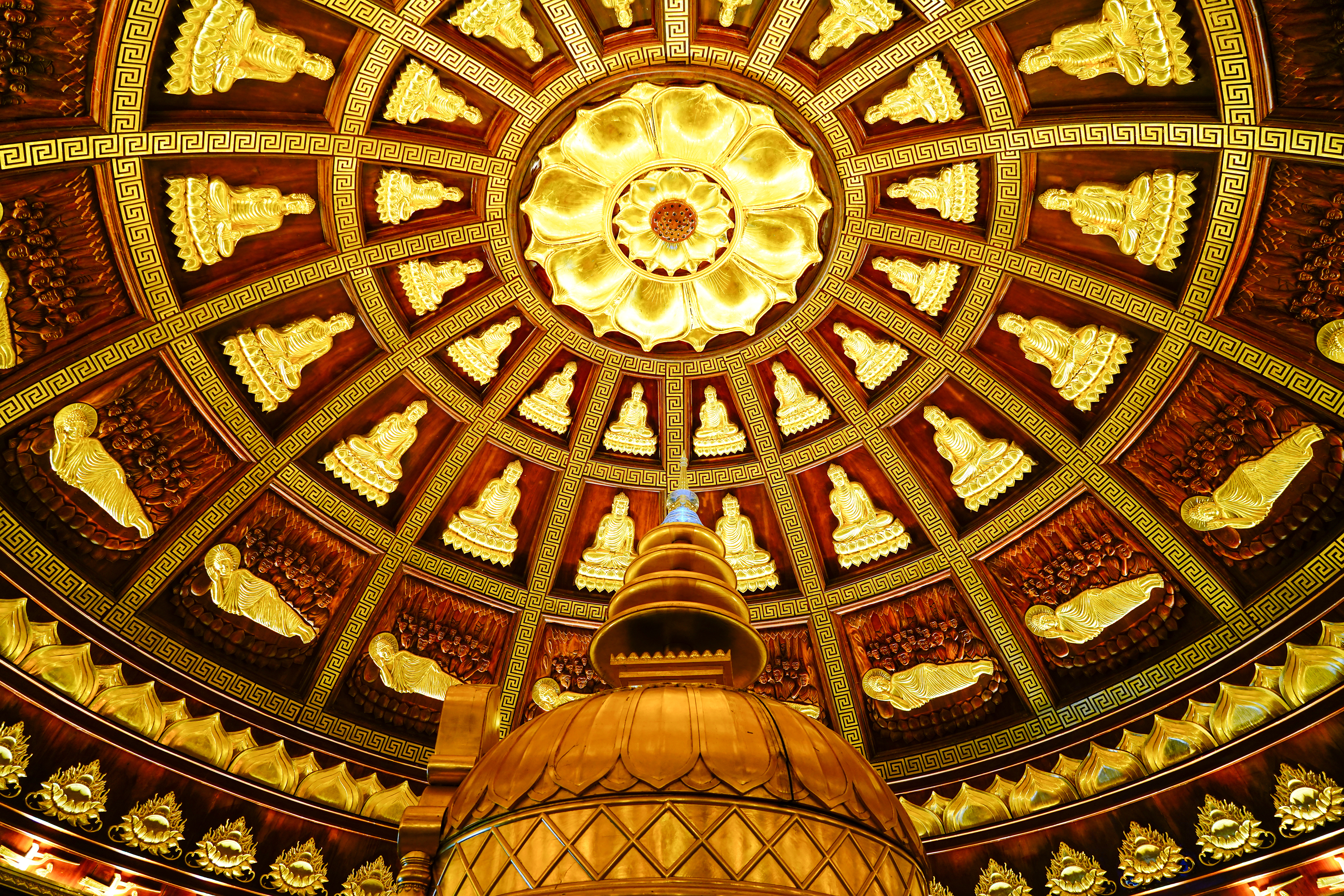
Inside the Bảo Tháp Pagoda, Bái Đính complex in Ninh Bình

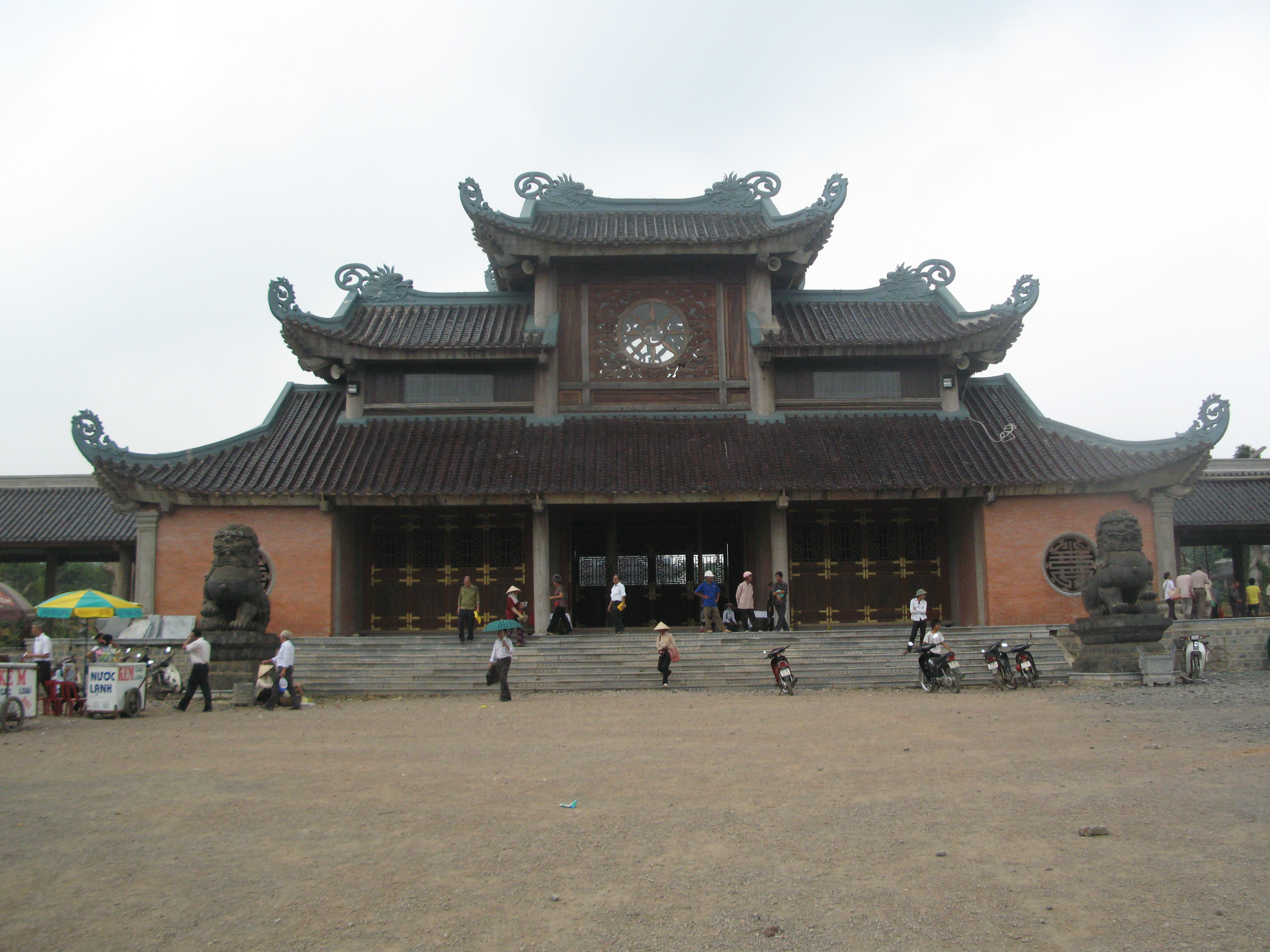
The Tam quan

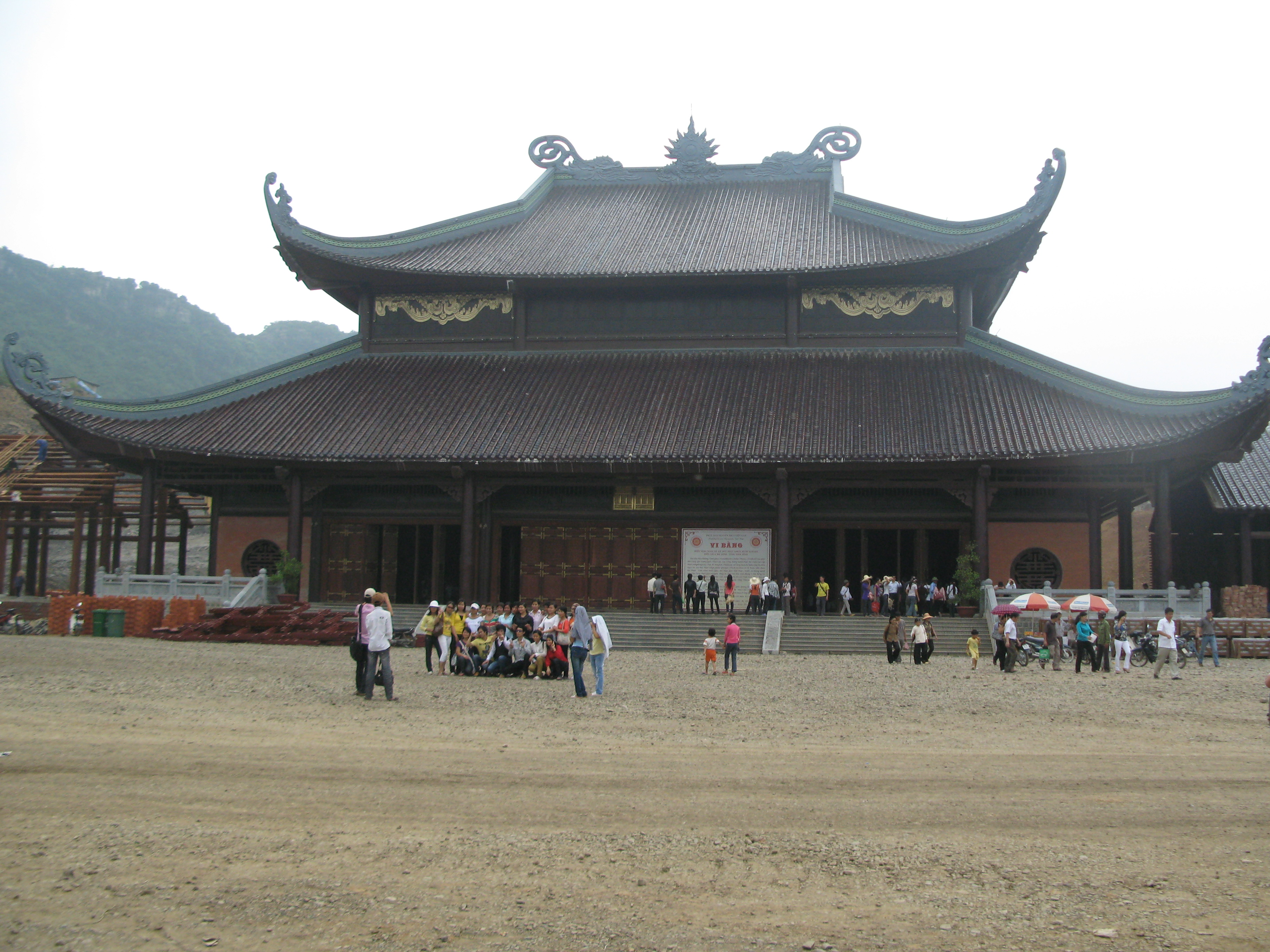
Pháp Chủ Hall, devoted to the veneration of Gautama Buddha

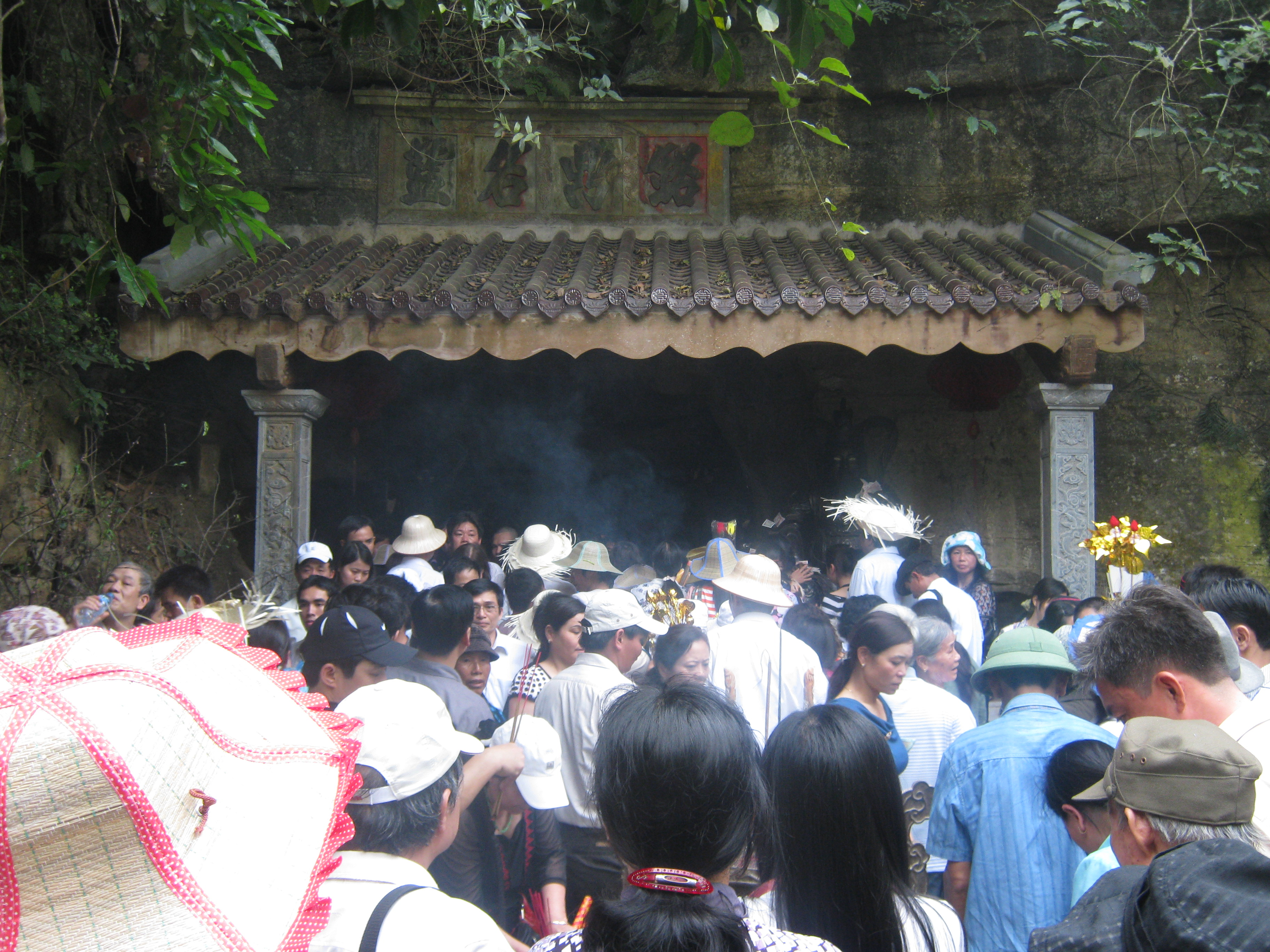
Crowds convening for the Festival at the entry to the Old Temple

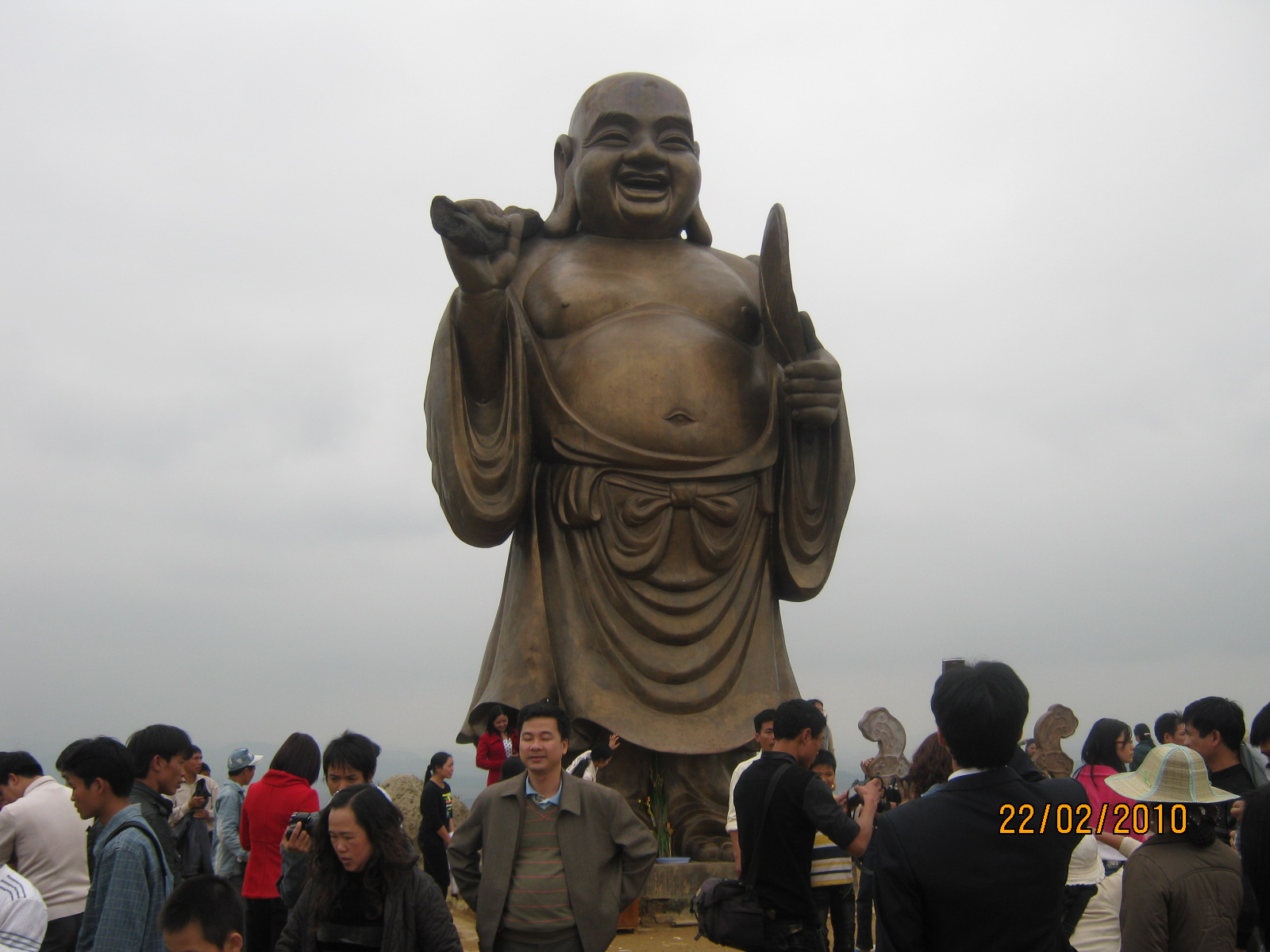
Budai as the Maitreya Buddha

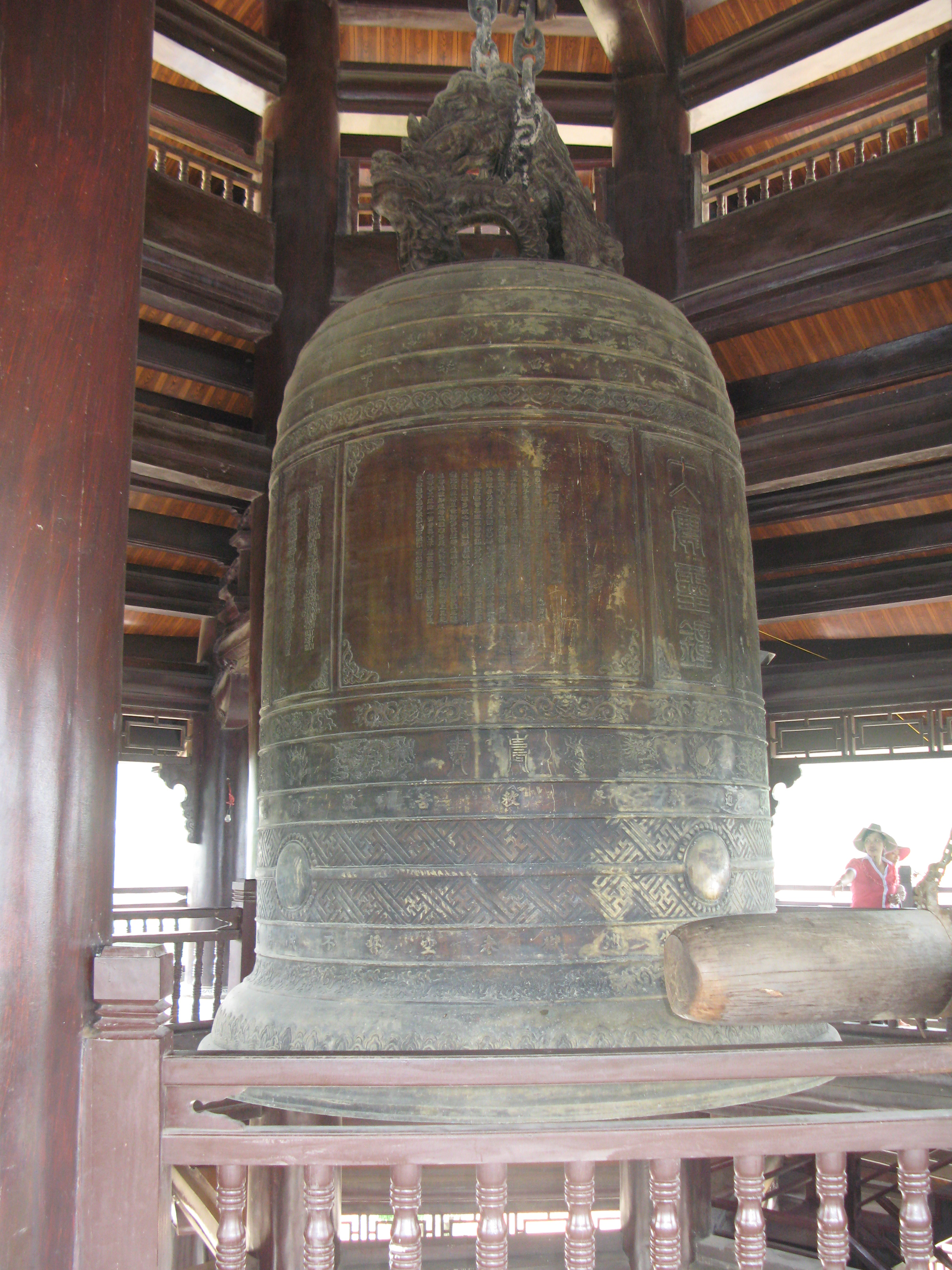
The 36-ton bronze bell in the Bell Tower

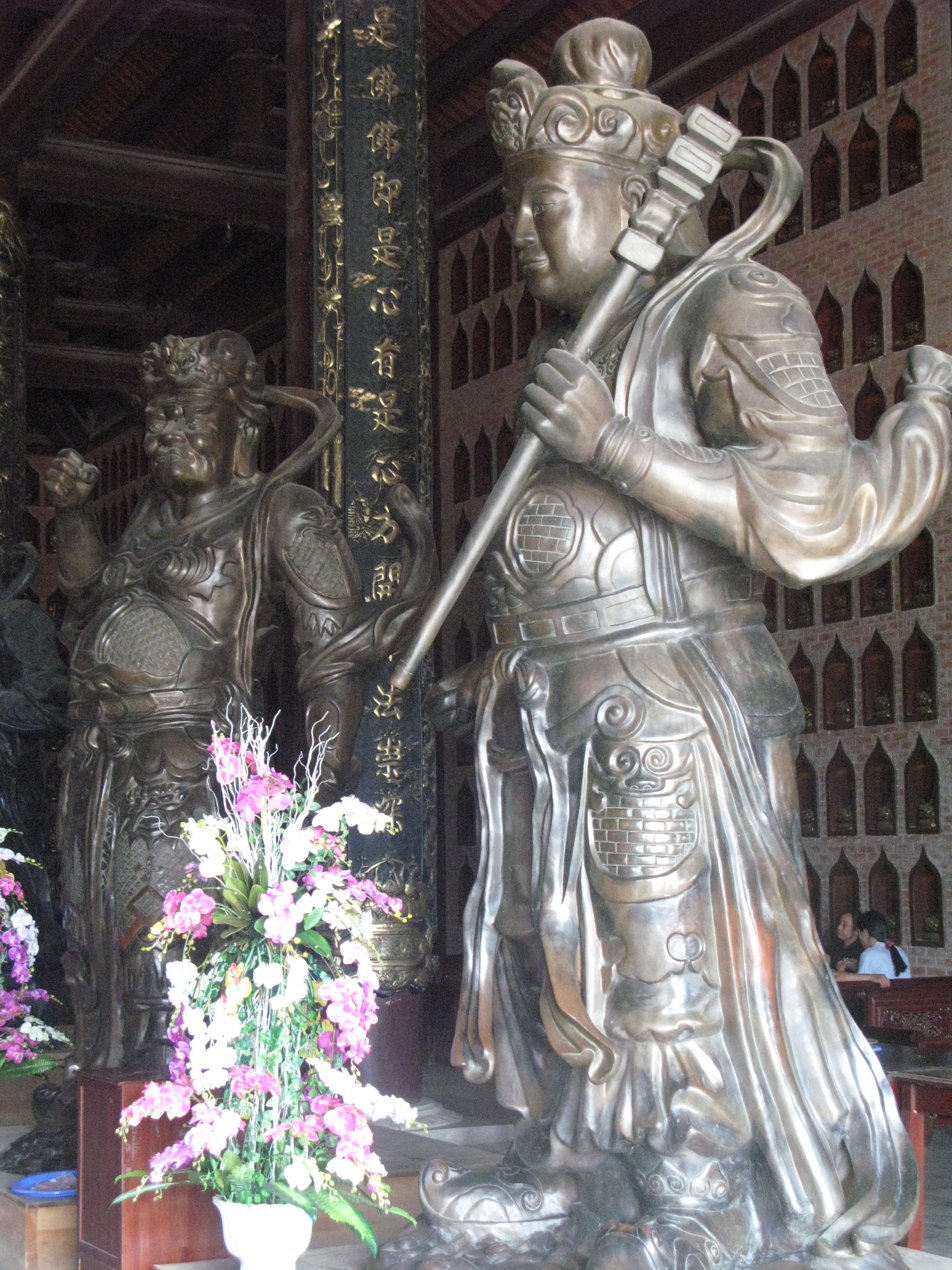
Buddhist guardians

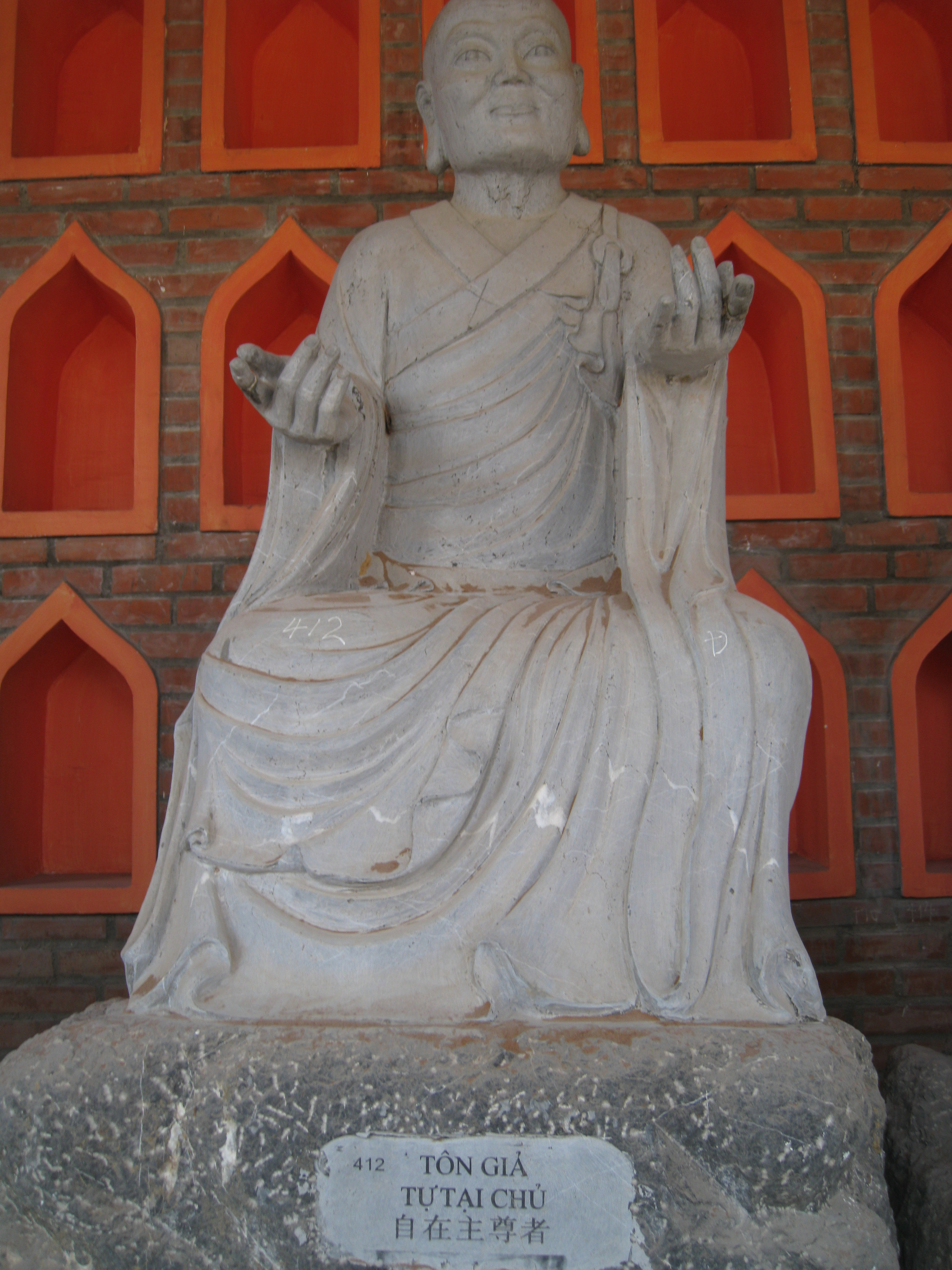
Arhat Subhuti
