= Cúc Phương National Park =

National park in Vietnam

Coordinates: 20°19′00″N 105°36′30″E

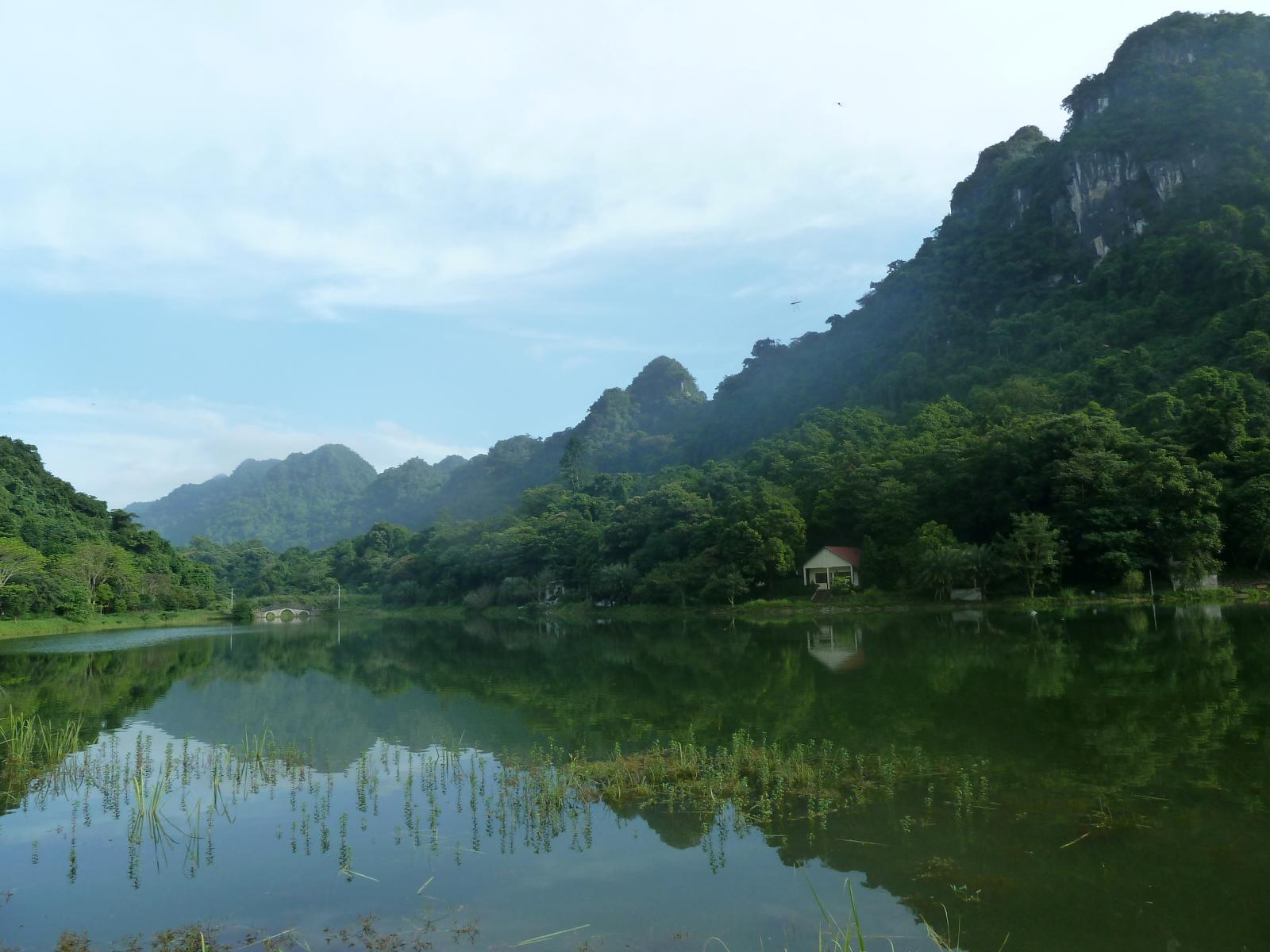
Cúc Phương National Park

Cúc Phương National Park (Vietnamese: Vườn quốc gia Cúc Phương) is located in Ninh Bình Province, in Vietnam's Red River Delta. Cuc Phuong was Vietnam's first national park and is the country's largest nature reserve. The park is one of the most important sites for biodiversity in Vietnam.

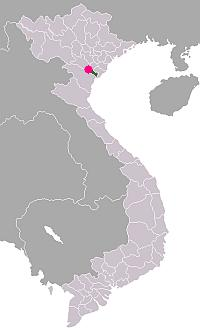
Map of Vietnam. Cúc Phương National Park is marked in red. Ninh Bình Province is marked in black

== History ==
In 1960 Cúc Phương was made into a forest reserve and in 1962 Cúc Phương National Park was consecrated by President Ho Chi Minh. Human habitation in Cúc Phương dates back long before the park's creation, 7,000-12,000 years ago. Artifacts from that time have been found in numerous caves within the park, including human graves, stone axes, pointed bone spears, oyster shell knives, and tools for grinding. In 1789 the Quen Voi section of the park was the site of a major battle in the civil war between Nguyễn Huệ and Thăng Long. More recently, conflicts have emerged between the government and 2,500 Muong ethnic minority tribesmen who live, farm, and hunt in the park. In 1987, 500 Muong were relocated outside of the park because of issues over poaching and land use.

== Landscape and climate ==
Cúc Phương is situated in the foothills of the northern Annamite Range. The park consists of verdant karst mountains and lush valleys. Elevation varies from 150 meters (500 feet) to 656 m (2,152 feet) at the summit of May Bac Mountain, or Silver Cloud Mountain. The limestone mountains house numerous caves, many of which are accessible for exploration.

The average temperature in Cúc Phương is 21 Celsius (70 Fahrenheit), with a mean winter temperature of 9C (48F). High temperatures can reach above 30C (85 F) and lows are just above zero (32 F). At the low elevations in the valley the temperature is hot and humid while at higher elevations the temperature drops and frostbite is a threat. On average it rains more than 200 days a year and the average annual rainfall is 2,100mm (7 feet). The dry season is November to February, the driest months being December and January.

== Flora and fauna ==
Cúc Phương is home to an amazing diversity of flora and fauna. Inhabitants of the park include 97 species of mammals, most notable endangered langurs; 300 species of birds; 36 reptilian species; 17 species of amphibians; 11 species of fish; 159 species and 1 additional subspecies of terrestrial molluscs; 2,000 species of vascular plants, and thousands of species of insects. Park diversity includes a number of endangered species listed in the Vietnam Red Book.

Terminalia myriocarpa labelled as the "Thousand year old tree"

The park covers portions of the Northern Vietnam lowland rain forests and Northern Indochina subtropical forests ecoregions.

Primates in the park include macaques, gibbon, François's leaf monkey and slow loris. Other mammals include bats, porcupine, flying squirrel, small striped squirrel, belly-banded squirrel, and the rare black giant squirrel. In the past the park was home to Asiatic black bears, wild dogs, elephants, rhinos, and tigers, but over hunting and lack of prey have most led to the loss of these species. Leopards, clouded leopards, and jungle cats may still be present in the park.

Bird species include bar-backed partridge, scaly-breasted partridge, silver pheasant, red junglefowl, grey peacock-pheasant, laughingthrushes, red-vented barbet, green-eared barbet, scimitar-billed babblers, brown boobook, scarlet minivet, racket-tailed drongos, racket-tailed treepie, white-winged blue magpie. Migrant species include thrushes, flycatchers, tits, finches, pipits amongst others. Hornbills can also be spotted in the forest.

An endemic subspecies of sub-terranean cave fish is also found in the park. It is also the type locality of many invertebrate species including: Zaxiphidiopsis bazyluki.

Flora in the park includes multi-layered canopy, with a diversity of trees (some showing cauliflory) and large specimens growing up to 70m in height (illustrated), with labelled Tetrameles nudiflora and Carya sinensis. The flora consists of some 2000 recorded species with lianas and epiphytes including orchids and ferns such as Asplenium, with amazingly long leaves. The park also contains plants used for such practicalities as spices and medicines as well as edible fruits, nuts and shoots.

== Conservation programs ==
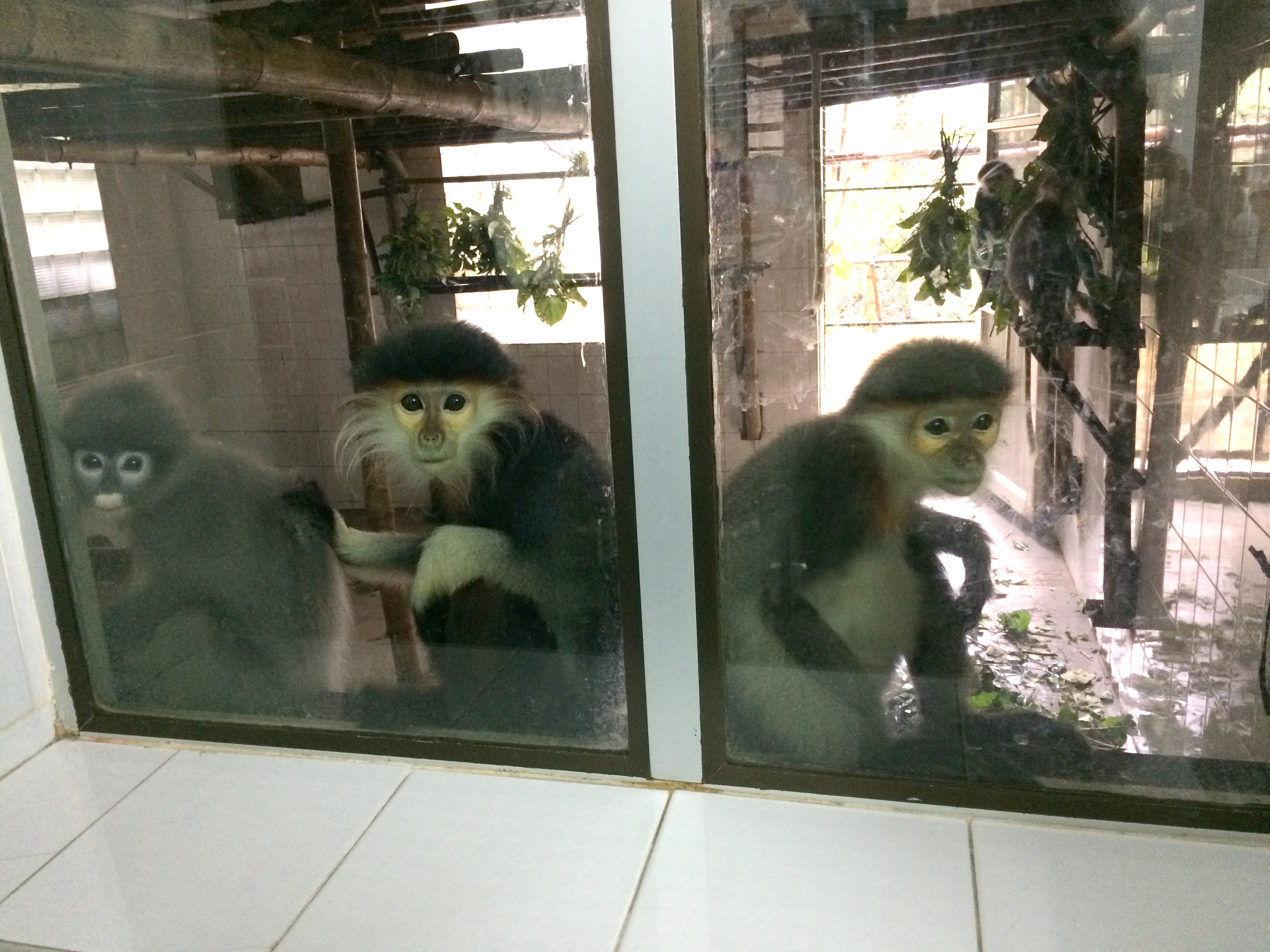
Endangered Primate Rescue Center

There are three conservation programs located in the Cúc Phương National park:

=== Endangered Primate Rescue Center ===
The primate center houses specimens of langurs, loris, and gibbon species, include the critically endangered Delacour's langur, golden-headed langur, and black crested gibbon. The primate center was established in 1993 with the help of the Frankfurt Zoological Society and has grown to 180 animals in 50 cages, 4 houses, and two semi-wild enclosures.

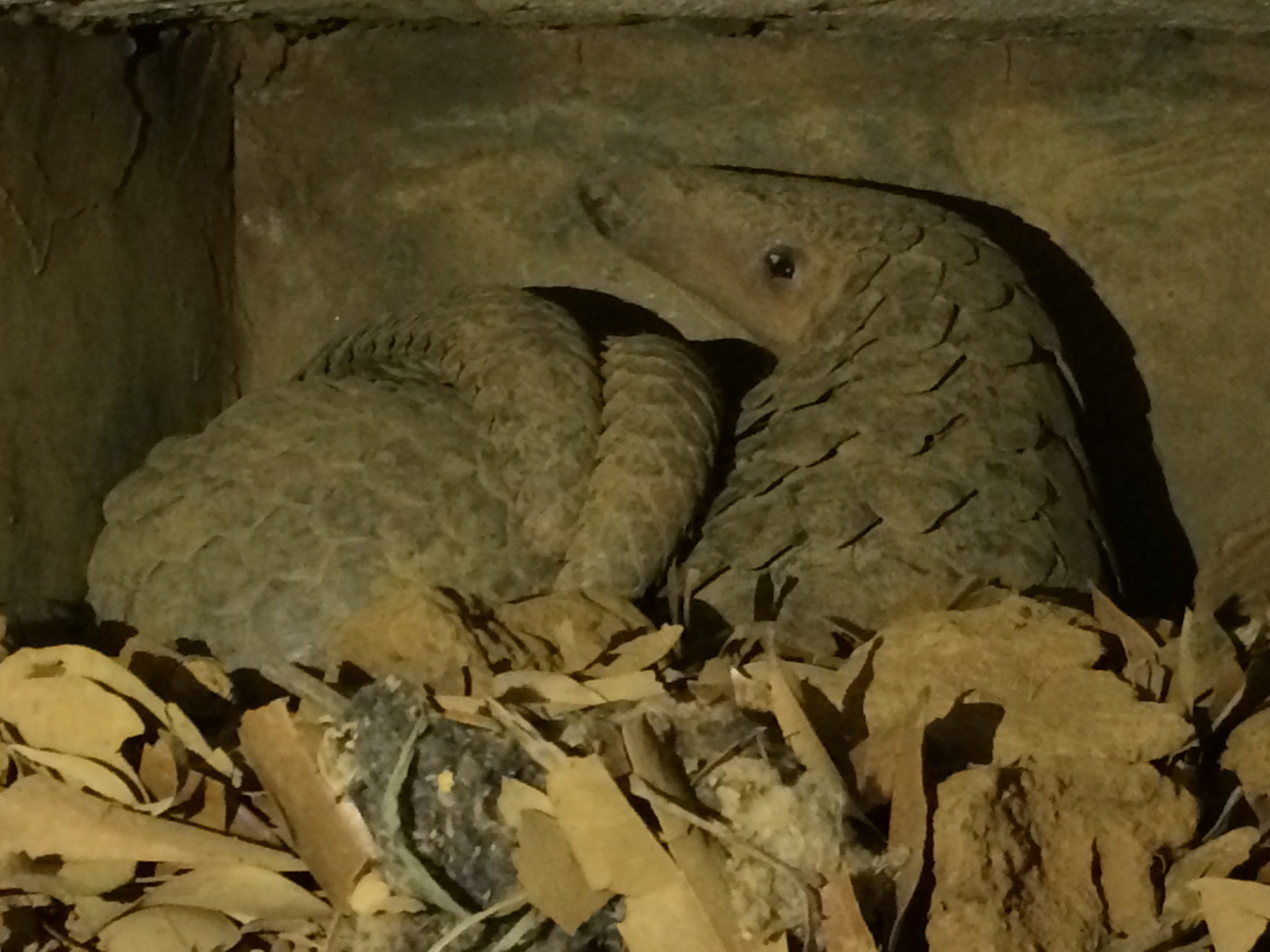
Mother and baby pangolin - Pangolin Rescue Center

=== Carnivore and Pangolin Conservation Program ===
The Carnivore and Pangolin Conservation Program (CPCP) is dedicated to the conservation of small carnivores (civets, linsangs, small cats, weasels, otters and badgers) and pangolins in Vietnam. The program was established in 1995 as a species specific program for the endangered Owston's civet and has since expanded to include all species of small carnivore. In 2006 the program also began focused conservation activities for Vietnam's two species of pangolin, the Chinese pangolin and the Sunda pangolin. All of these species are threatened by the illegal wildlife trade which is having a devastating impact on the wild populations of these species throughout South East Asia.

The CPCP aims to conserve these threatened species of mammal through the rescue and rehabilitation of trade confiscated wildlife, education and awareness and field research. The CPCP also runs the region's only conservation breeding program for the Owston's civet, a species that is endemic to Indochina, and whose main range is within Vietnam.

The CPCP's main centre is within Cúc Phương National Park, but operates a nationwide rescue program and has active field sites in Central and Southern Vietnam.

=== Turtle Conservation Center ===
The turtle conservation center was established in 1998 and is home to some of the most endangered turtles in Vietnam, including the Vietnamese pond turtle which is nearly extinct in the wild.

== Tourism ==
Cúc Phương National Park is one of the most popular nature tourist destinations in Vietnam. Tens of thousands of Vietnamese and a steady stream of foreign tourists visit the park each year. Lodging and restaurant facilities are available at the park's entrance and within the park. A paved road cuts into the park and a number of paths for hiking are maintained. Park rangers patrol Cuc Phuong and provide guided tours for a fee.

Other nearby tourist destinations located in Ninh Binh Province include Phát Diệm Cathedral, Hoa Lư Ancient Capital, Tam Cốc – Bích Động, Tràng An, and Bai Dinh Pagoda.
