= Ninh Bình province =

Province of Vietnam

Ninh Bình
- Province
- Tỉnh Ninh Bình 省寧平 native_name =
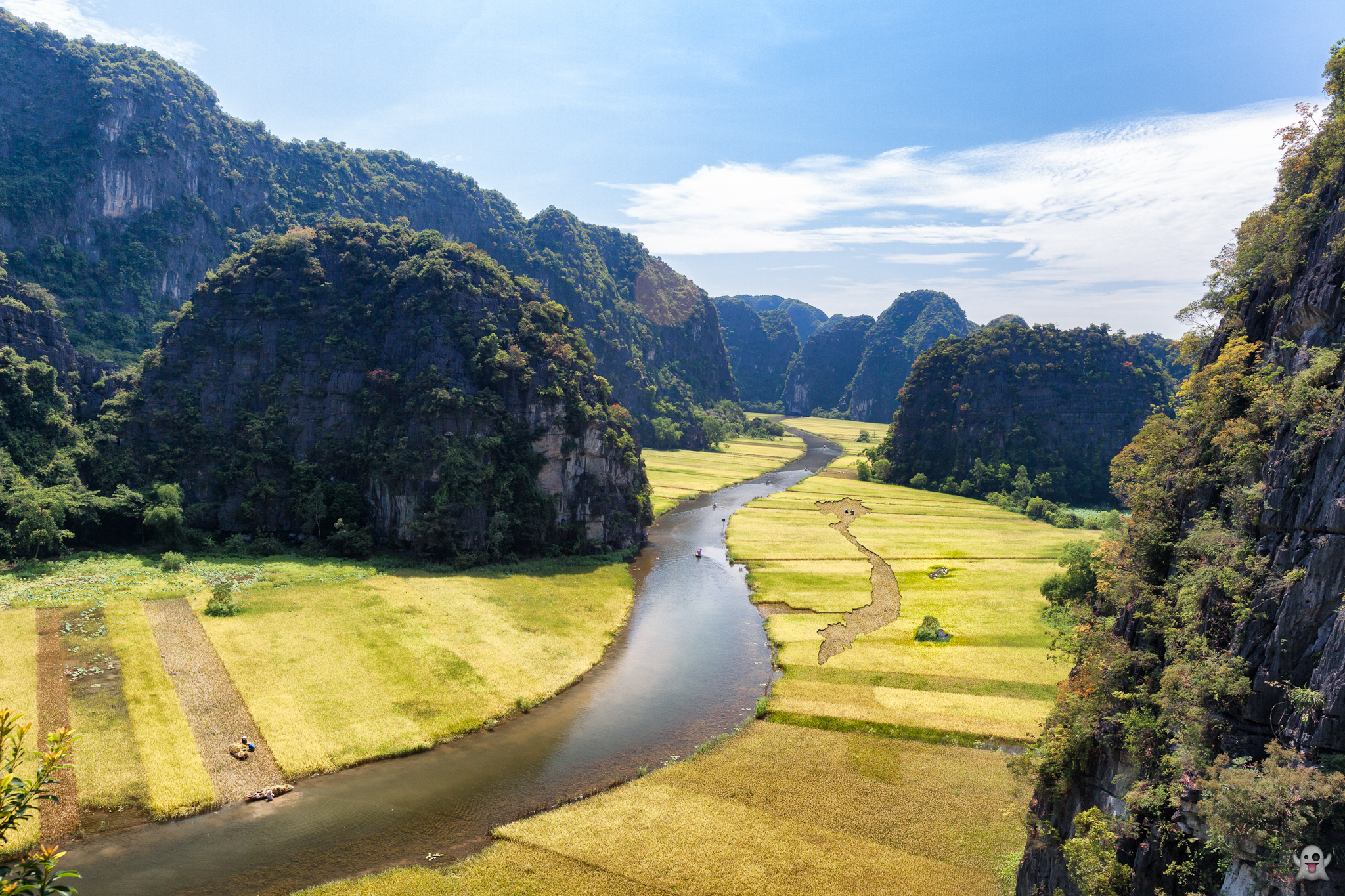
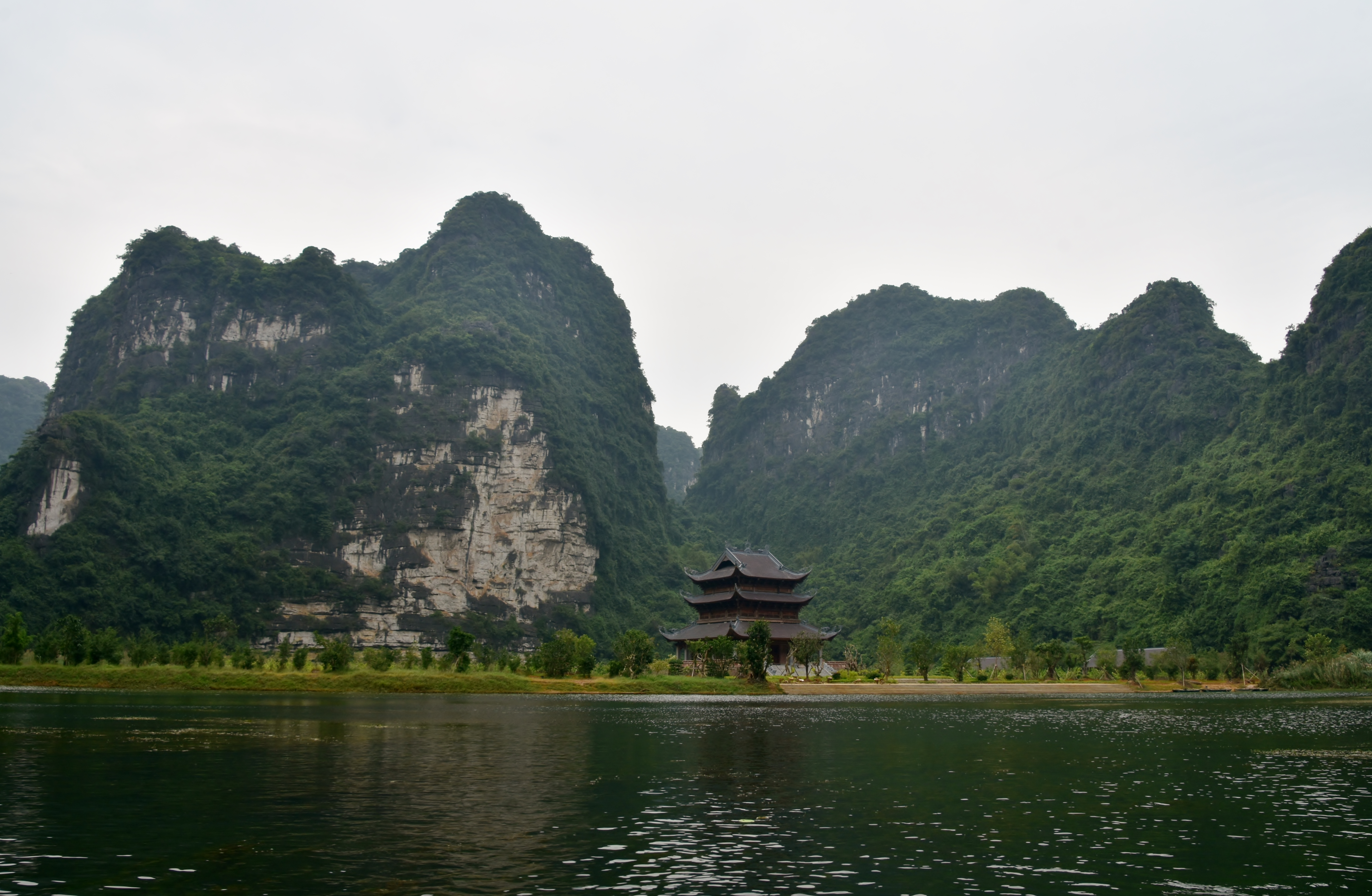
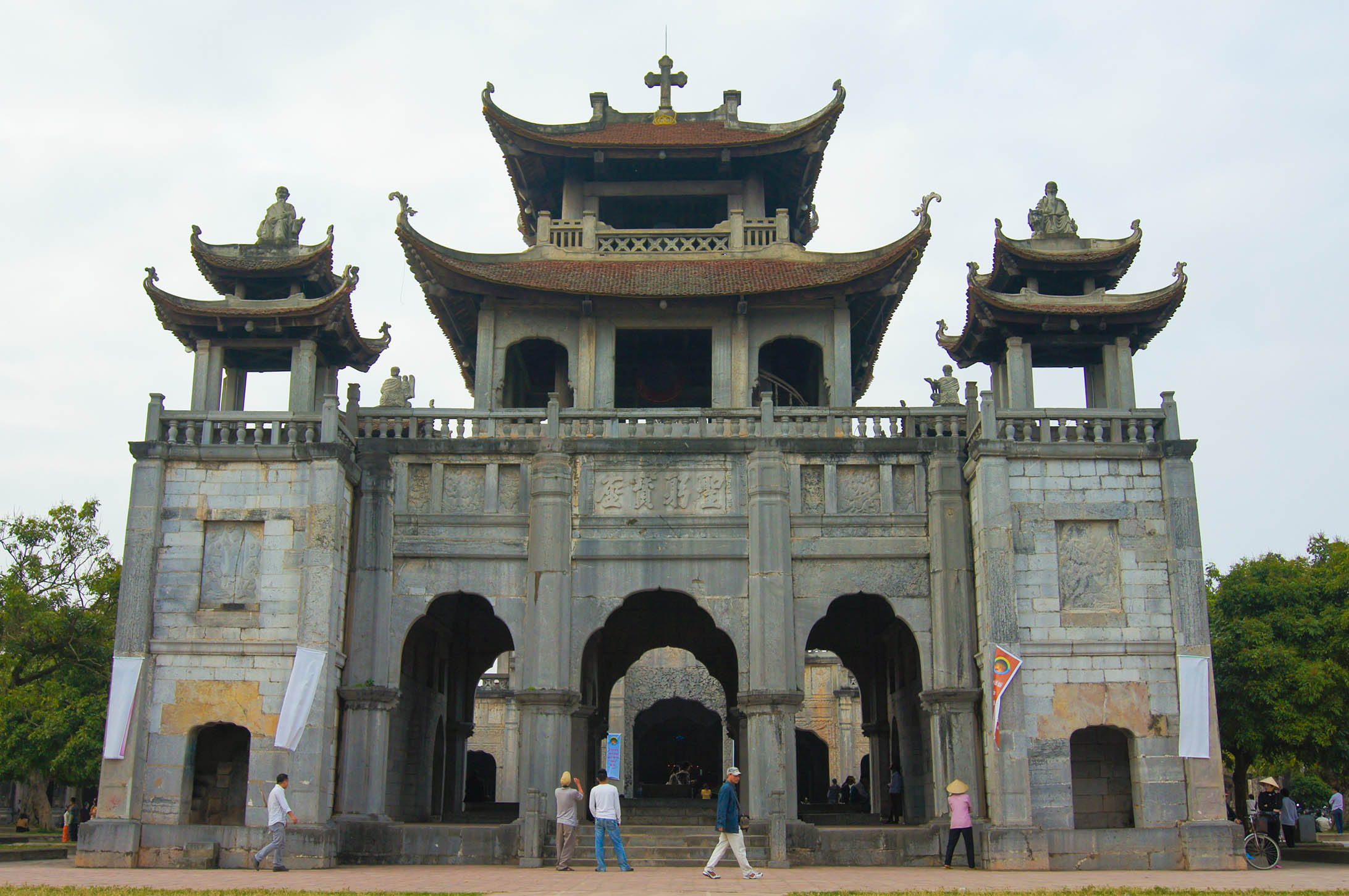
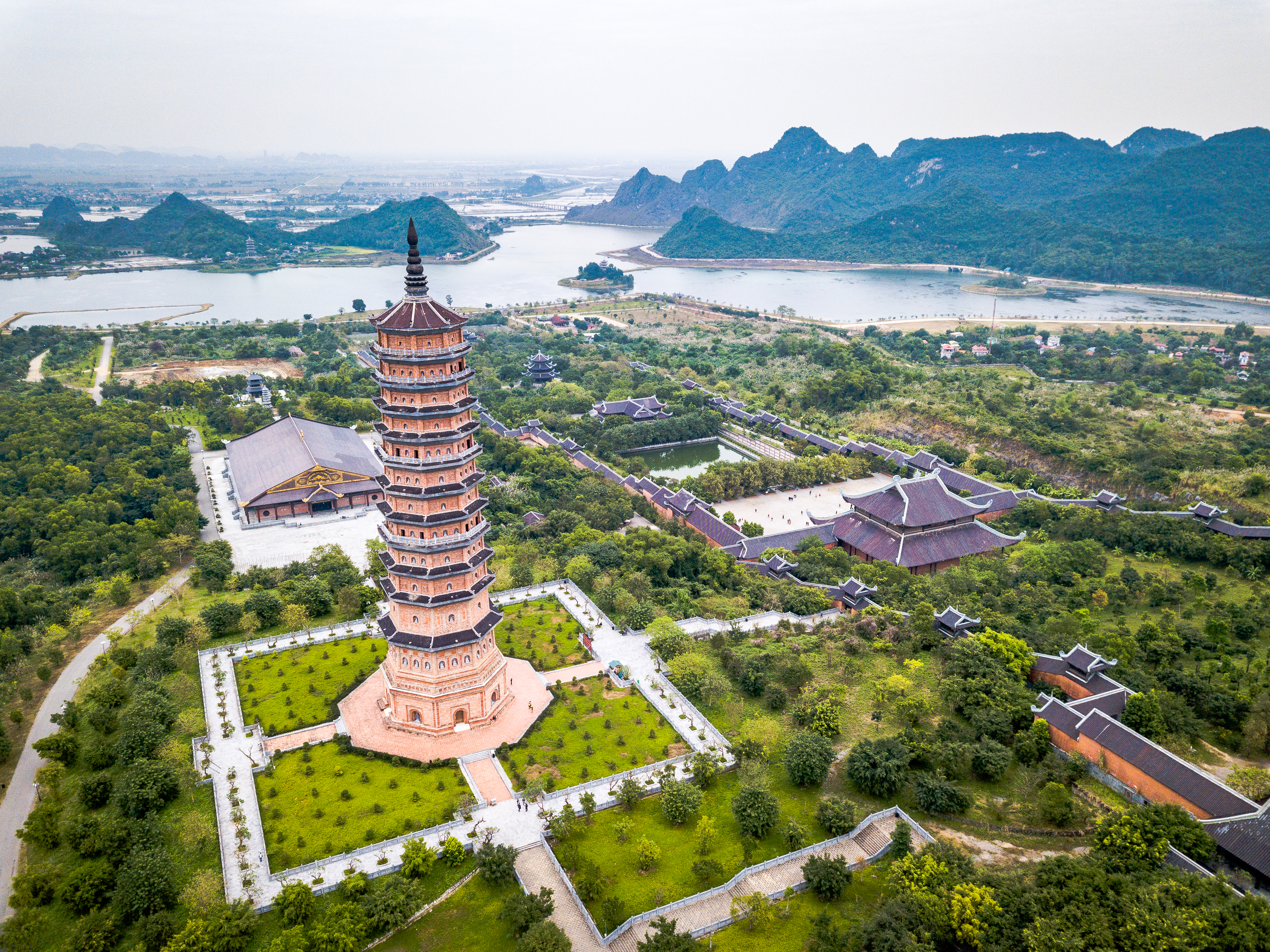
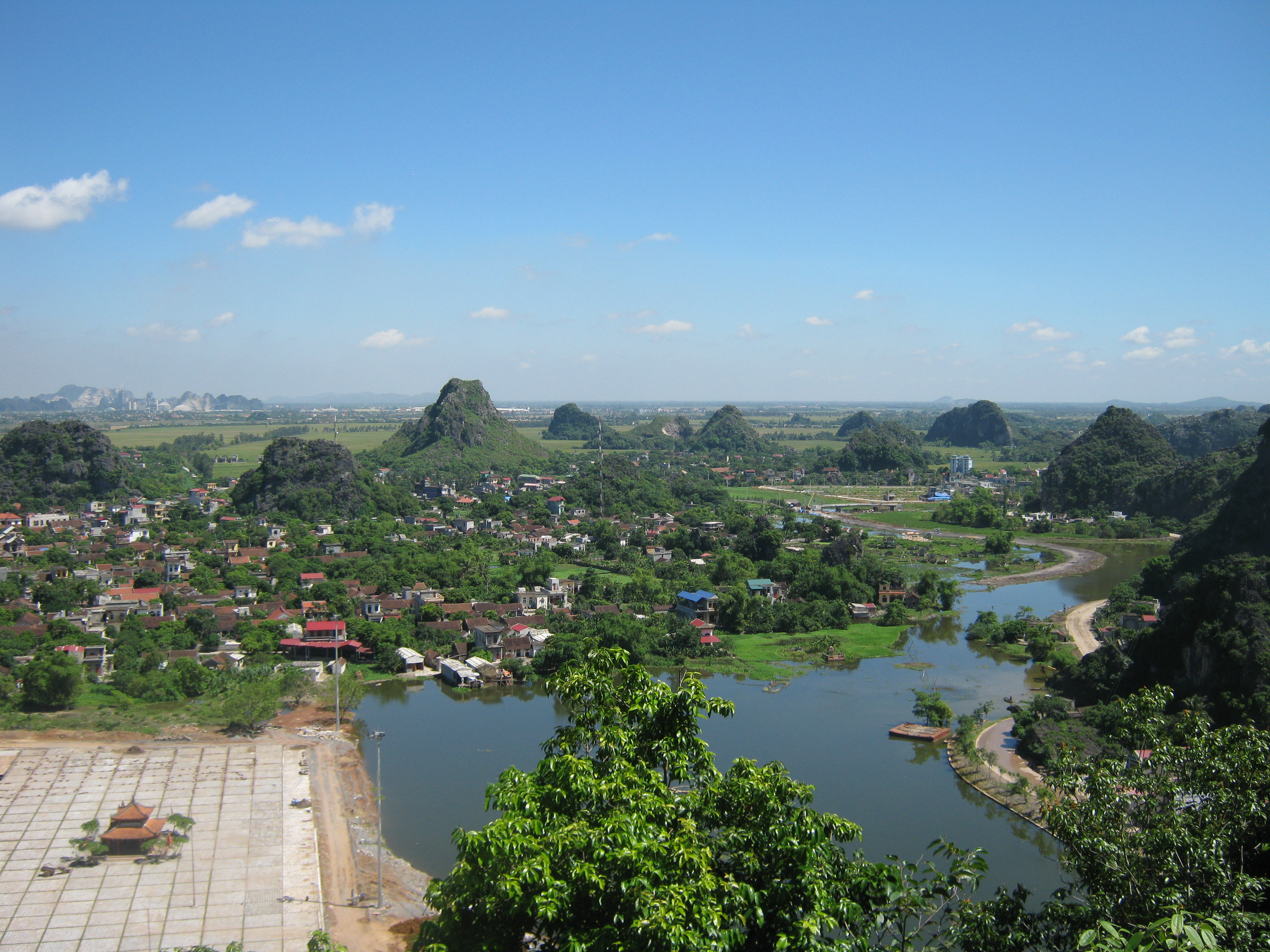
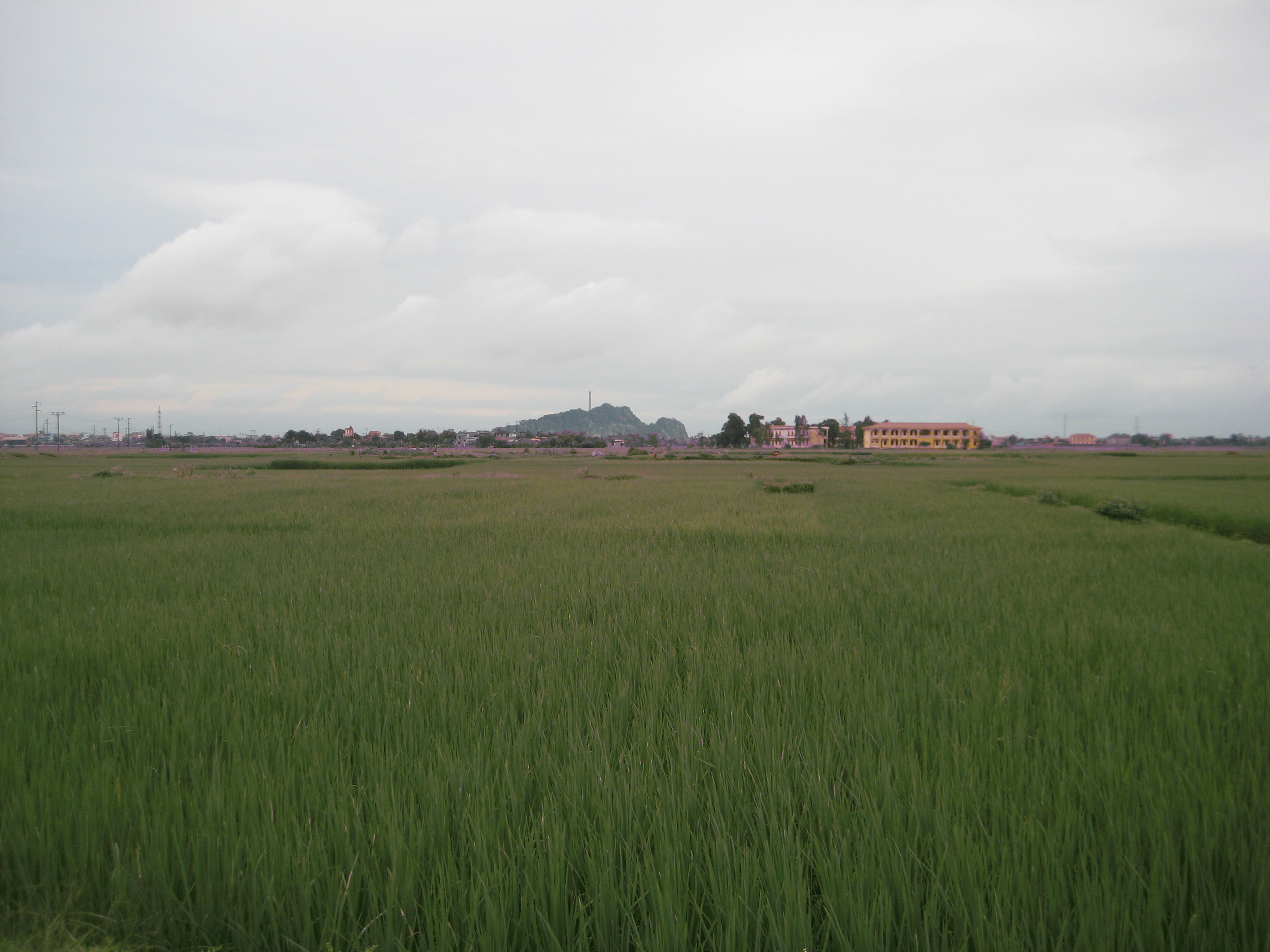
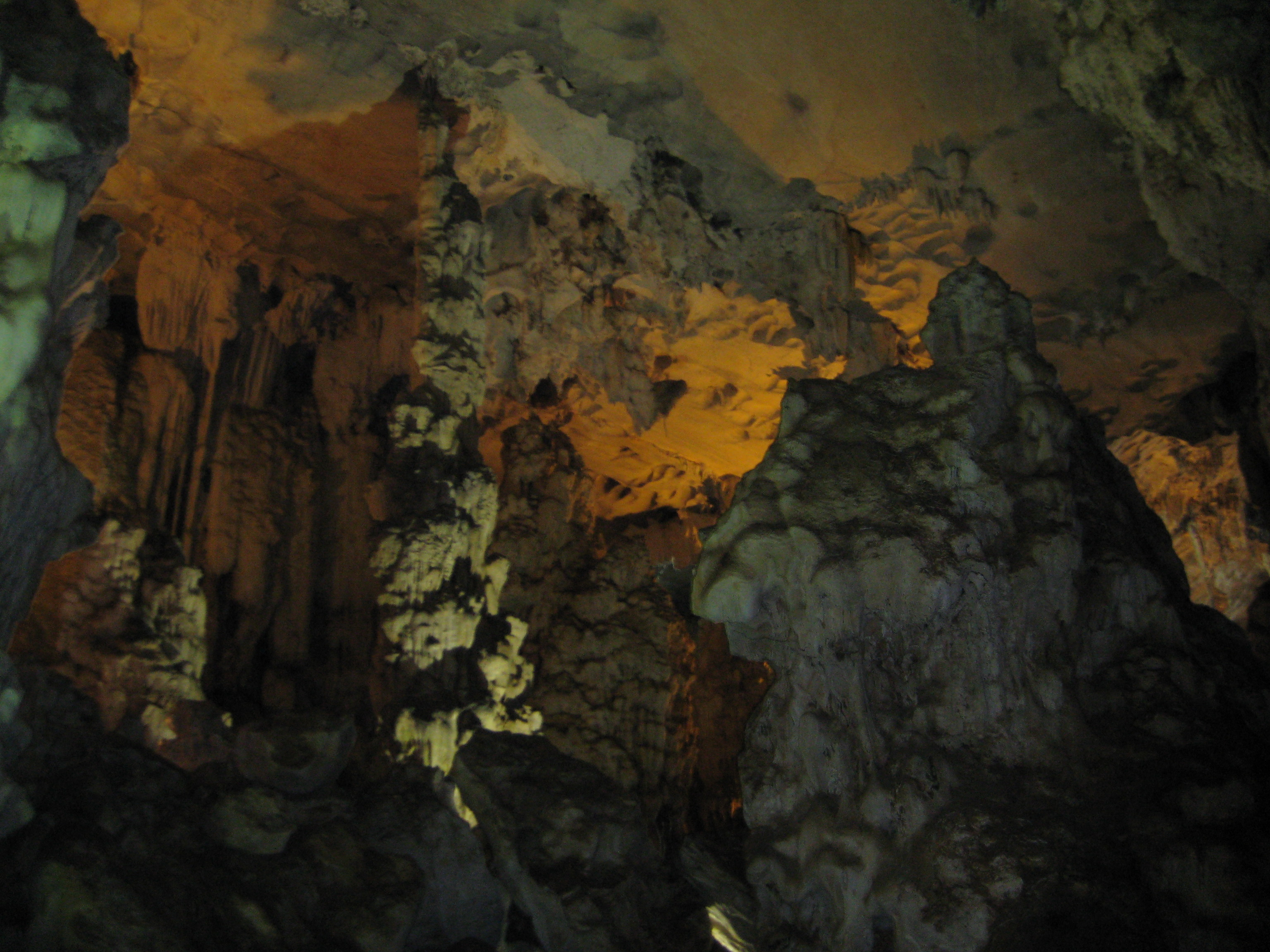
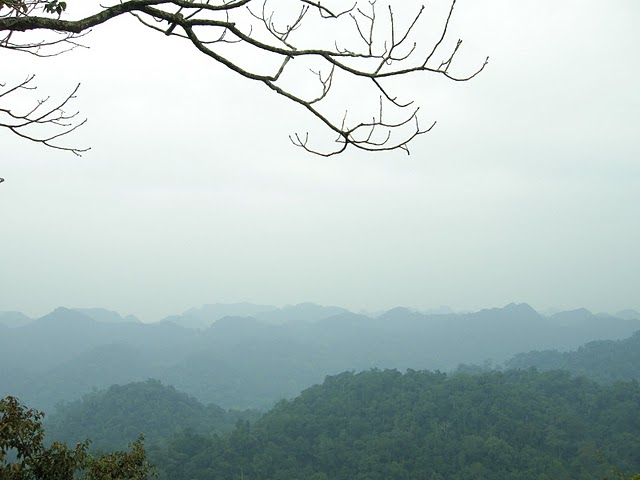
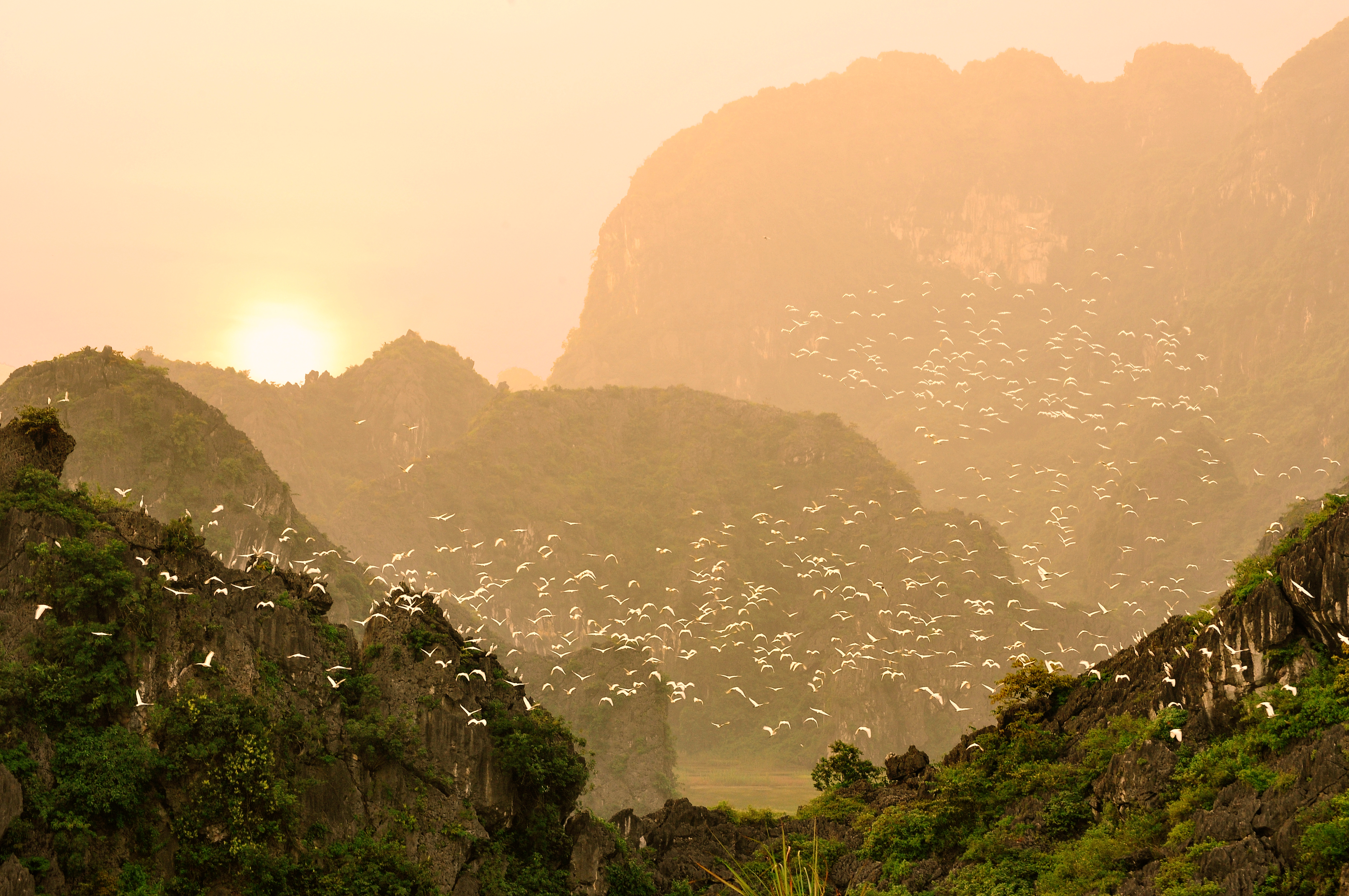
- Bích Động valley, near Tam Cốc in Tràng An UNESCO World Heritage Site • Tràng An Scenic Landscape Complex • Phát Diệm Cathedral • Bái Đính Temple • Hoa Lư • Mountain Ngọc Mỹ Nhân • Cave Vân Trình • Cúc Phương National Park • Thung Nham

- Seal
- Nickname: Serenity
- Location of Ninh Bình within Vietnam
- Interactive map of Ninh Bình
- Coordinates: 20°15′N 105°50′E
- Country: Vietnam
- Region: Red River Delta
- Capital: Hoa Lư ward

Government
  - People's Council Chair: Đinh Văn Hùng
  - People's Committee Chair: Đinh Văn Hùng

Area
  - Total: 3,942.62 km^{2} (1,522.25 sq mi)

Population (2025)
  - Total: 4,412,264
  - Density: 1,119.12/km^{2} (2,898.51/sq mi)

Demographics
  - Ethnicities: Vietnamese, Mường, Tày, H'Mông

GDP
  - Total: VND 47.205 trillion US$ 2.050 billion
- Time zone: UTC+07:00 (ICT)
- Area codes: 229
- ISO 3166 code: VN-18
- HDI (2020): ▲0.746 (15th)
- Website: ninhbinh.gov.vn

Ninh Bình (Vietnamese pronunciation: [nīɲ ɓìɲ]) is a province of Vietnam in the Red River Delta region. The province is known for natural and cultural attractions, including reserved parks in Cúc Phương National Park and Vân Long, grotto caves and rivers in Tràng An, Tam Cốc – Bích Động and Múa Caves, historic monuments in the Hoa Lư ancient capital, Vietnam's largest Buddhist worshipping complex (Bái Đính Pagoda), and the Phát Diệm Cathedral with "eclectic architectural style".

The current province was formed by merging the old Ninh Bình, Nam Định and Hà Nam provinces in 2025.

== Geography ==
Ninh Bình is located to the south of the northern Red River Delta, between the Red and Ma Rivers. It has a coastline abutting the Gulf of Tonkin.

The population is 1,010,700 people (2022), with a total area of 1,412 km^{2} (545 mi^{2}).

== Gallery ==
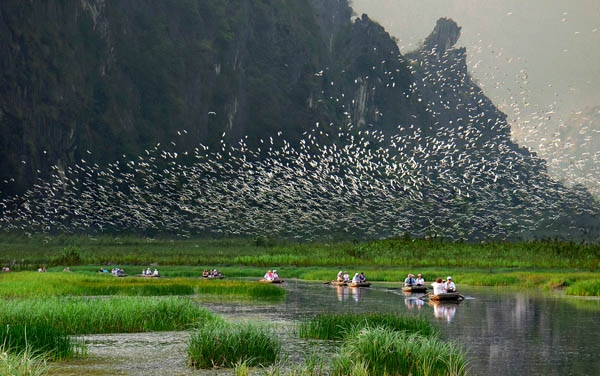
Vân Long Wetland Nature Reserve

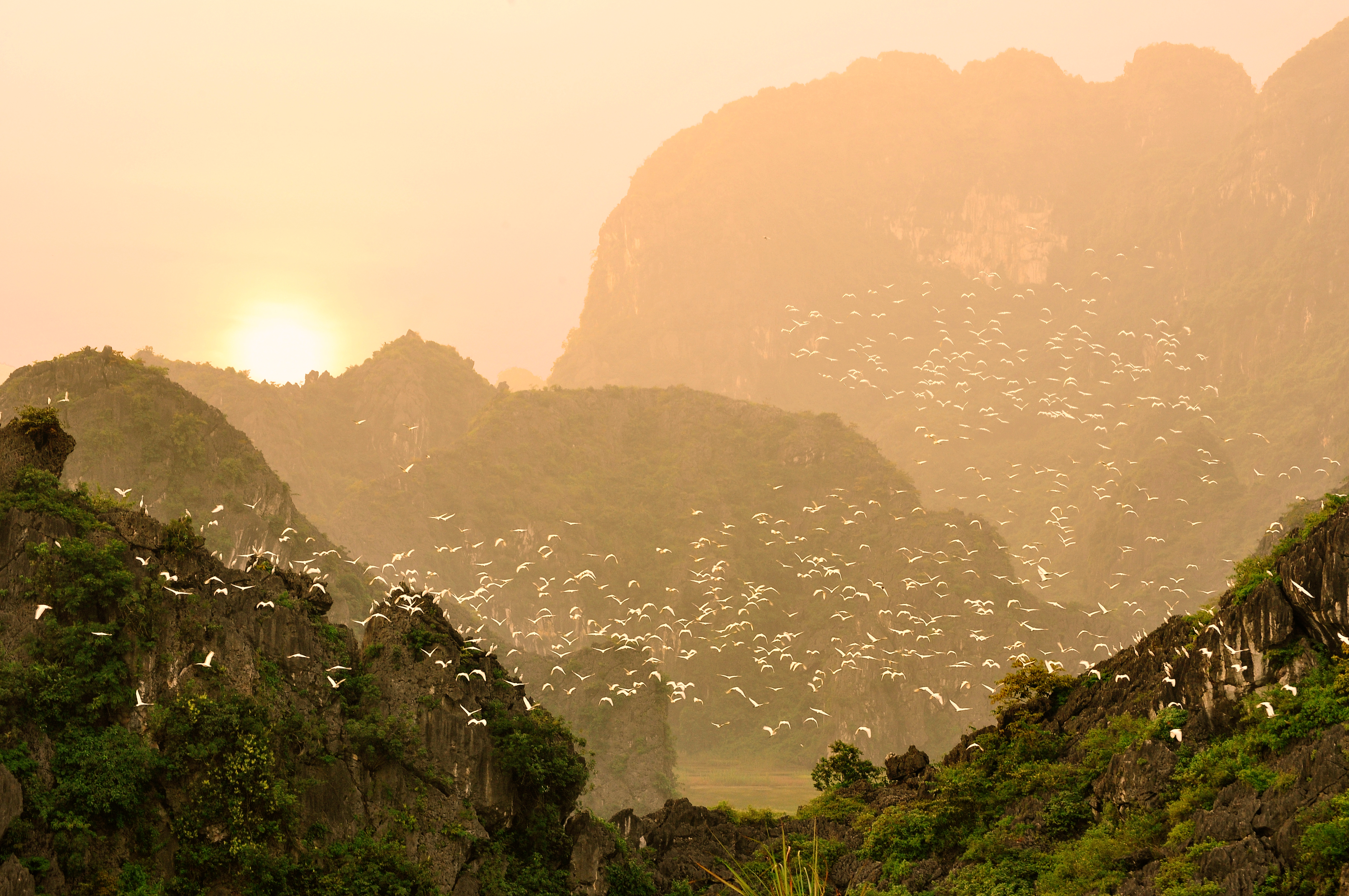
Thung Nham Bird Park

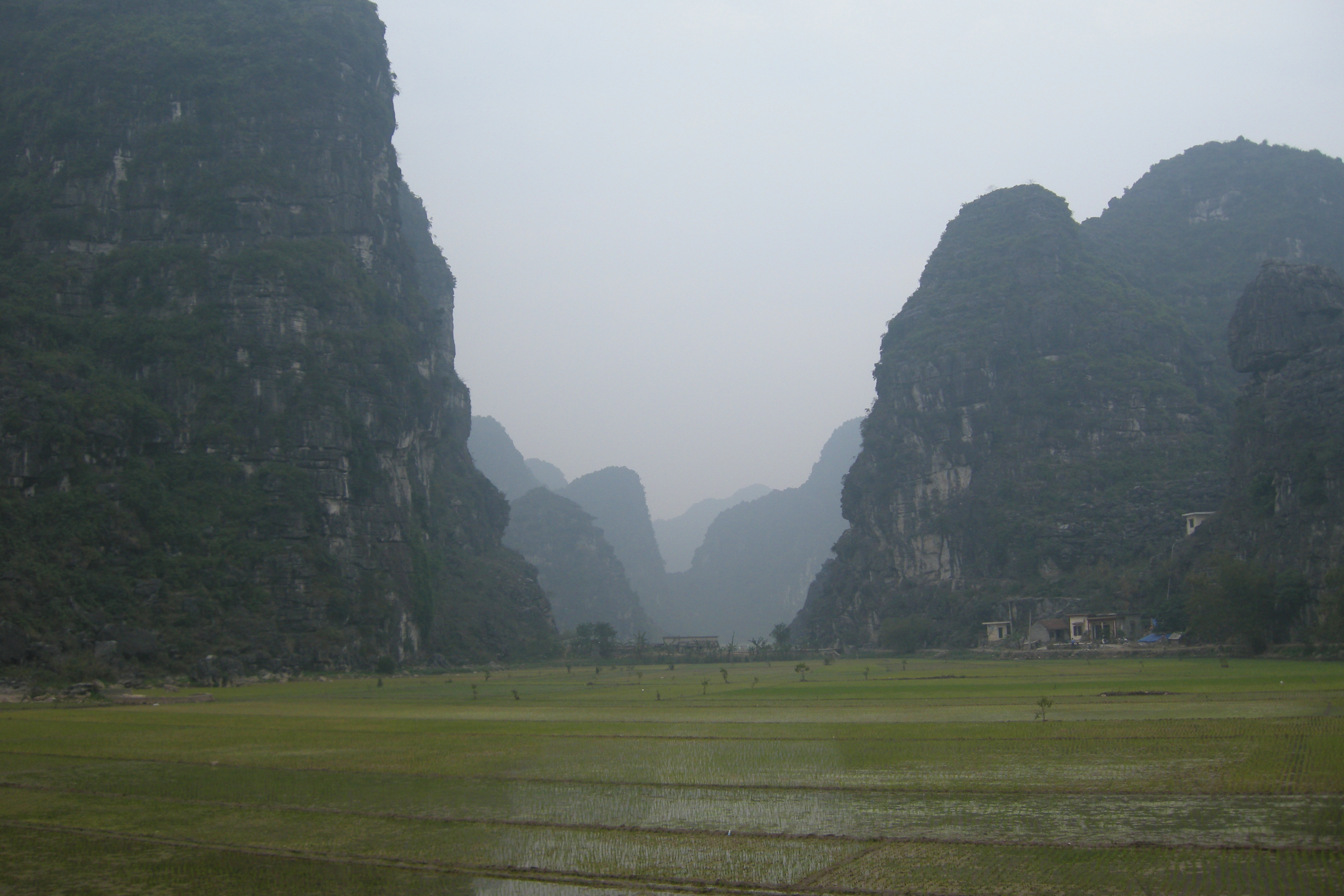
Limestone scenery

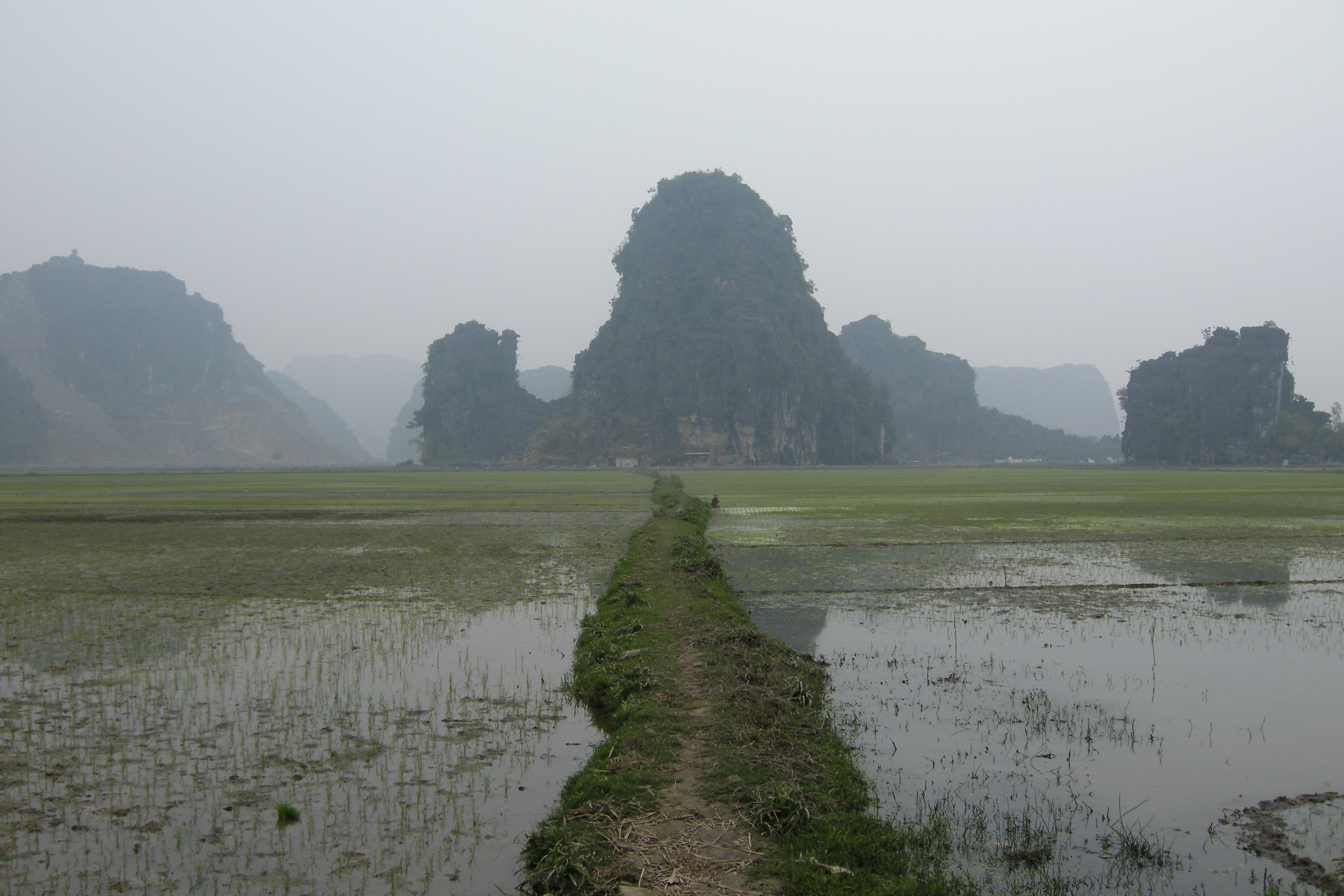
Rice paddies

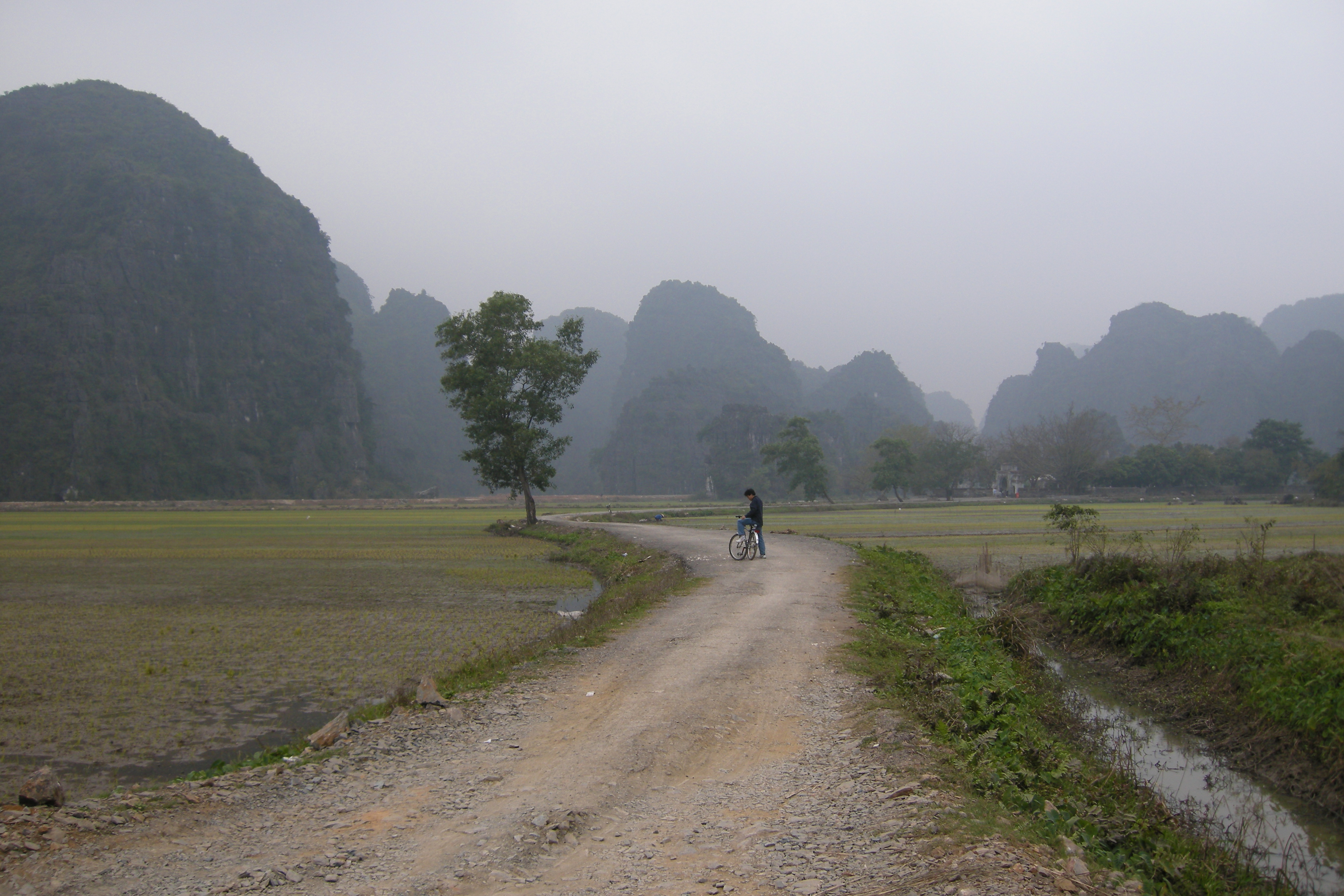
Landscape near Ninh Bình

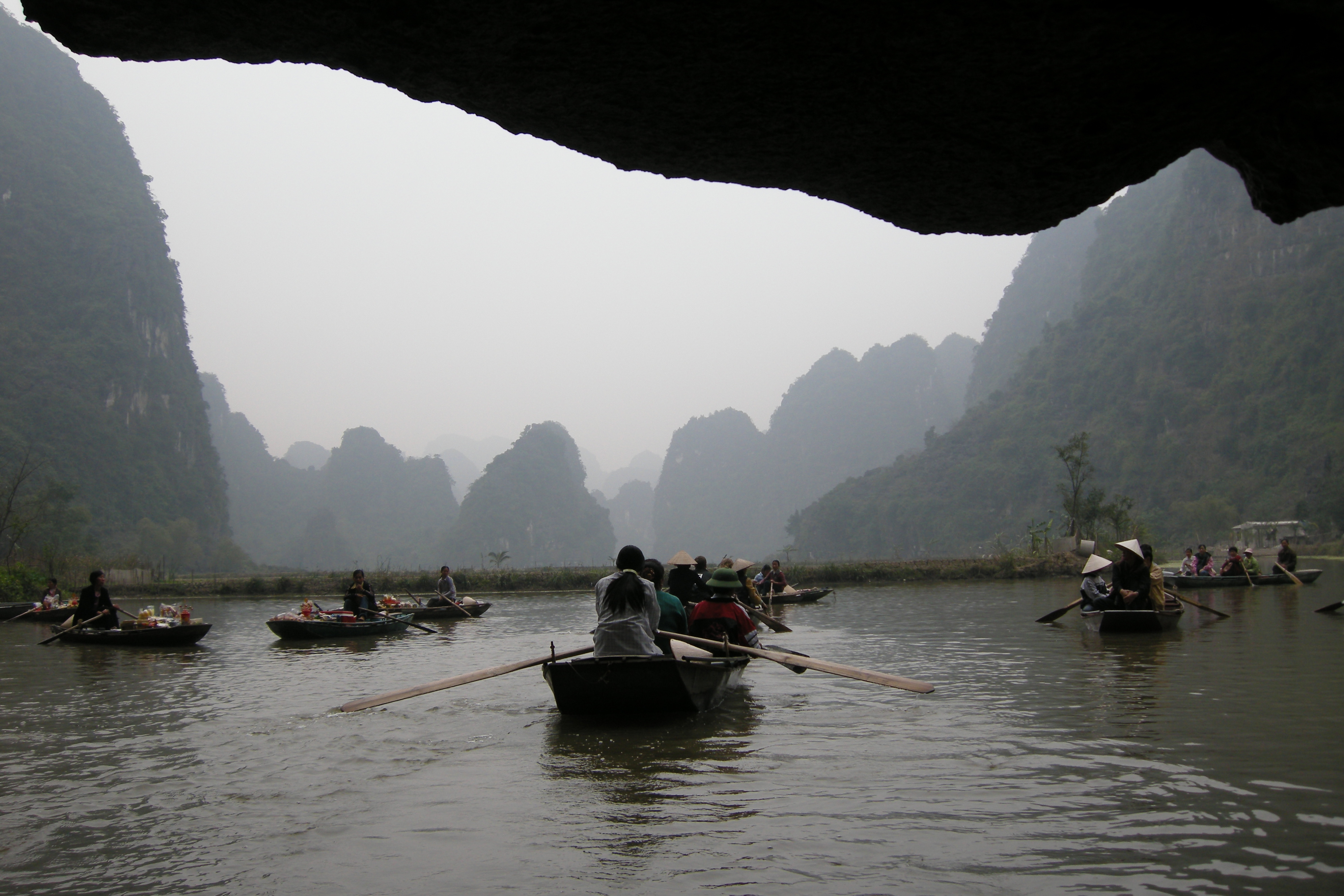
Tam Cốc – Bích Động

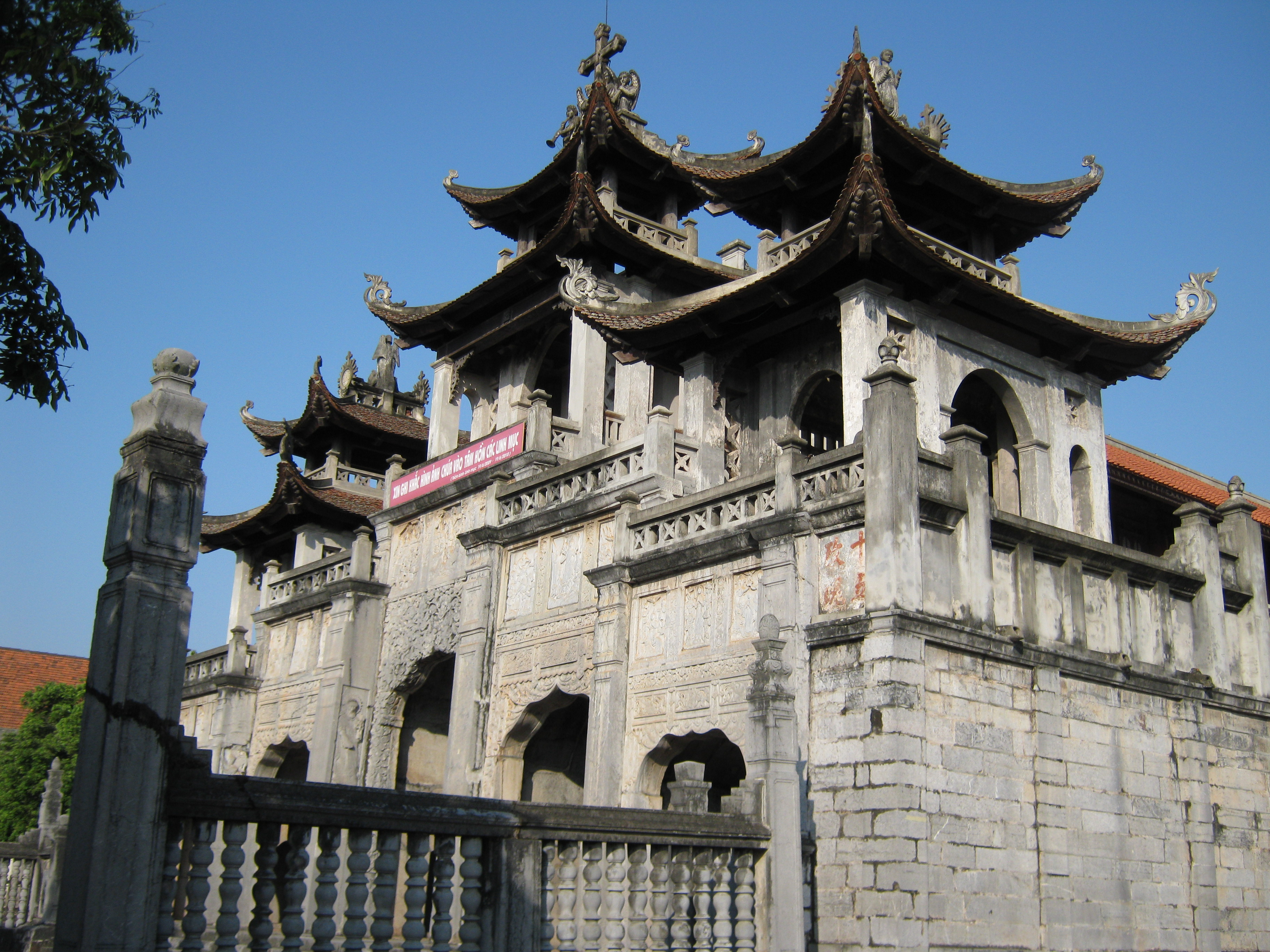
Phát Diệm Cathedral

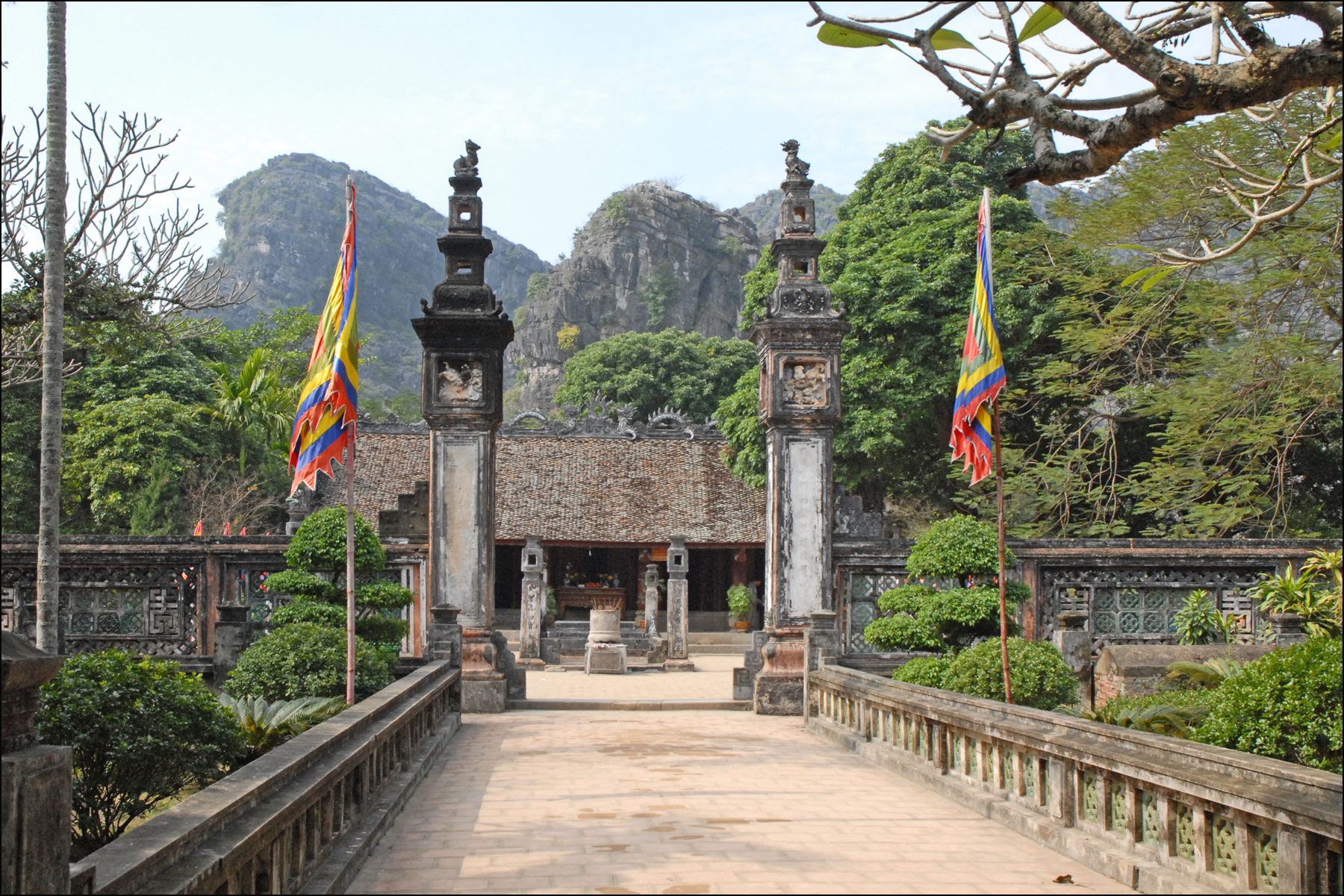
Hoa Lư - ancient capital

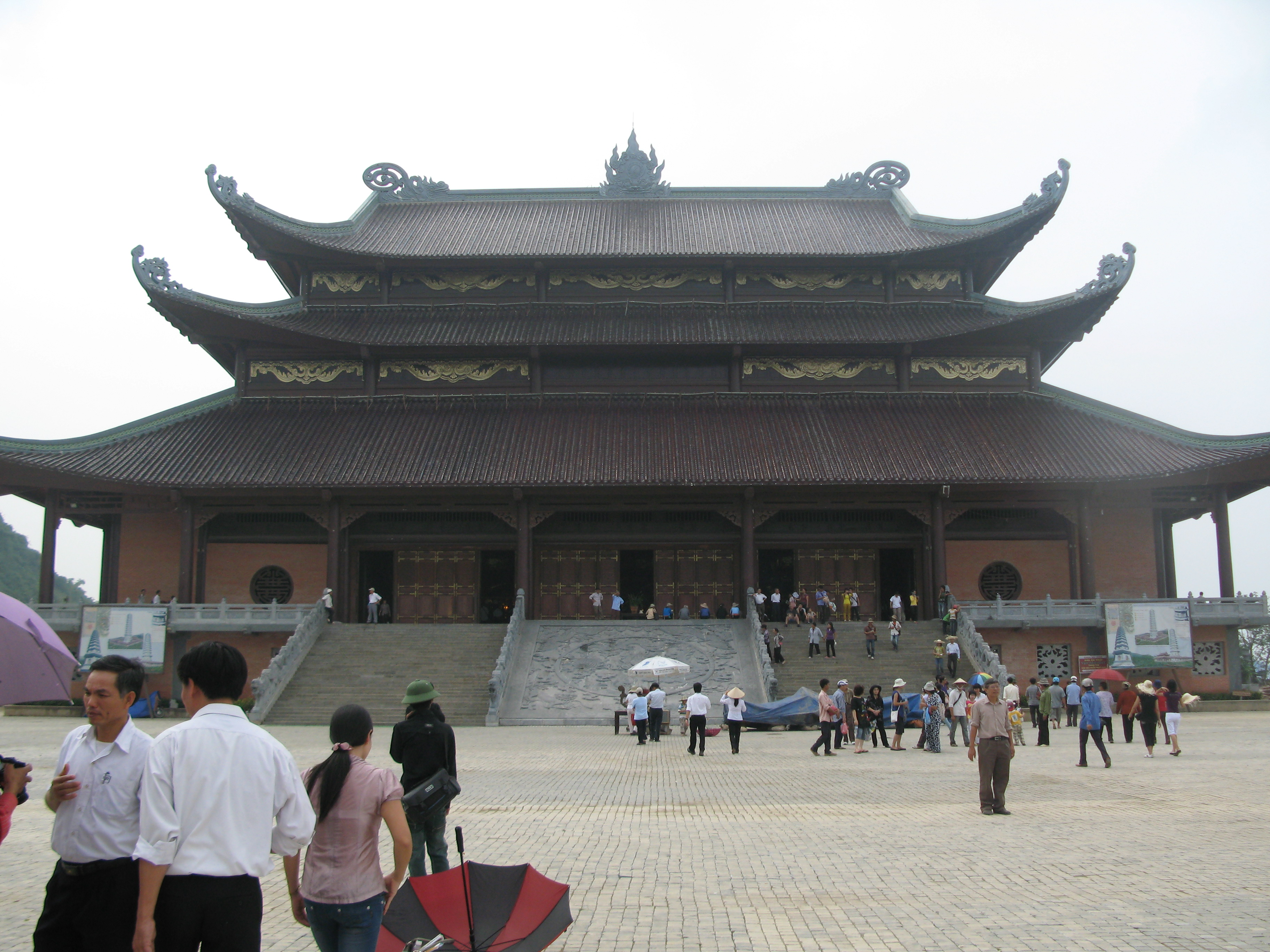
Bái Đính Pagoda

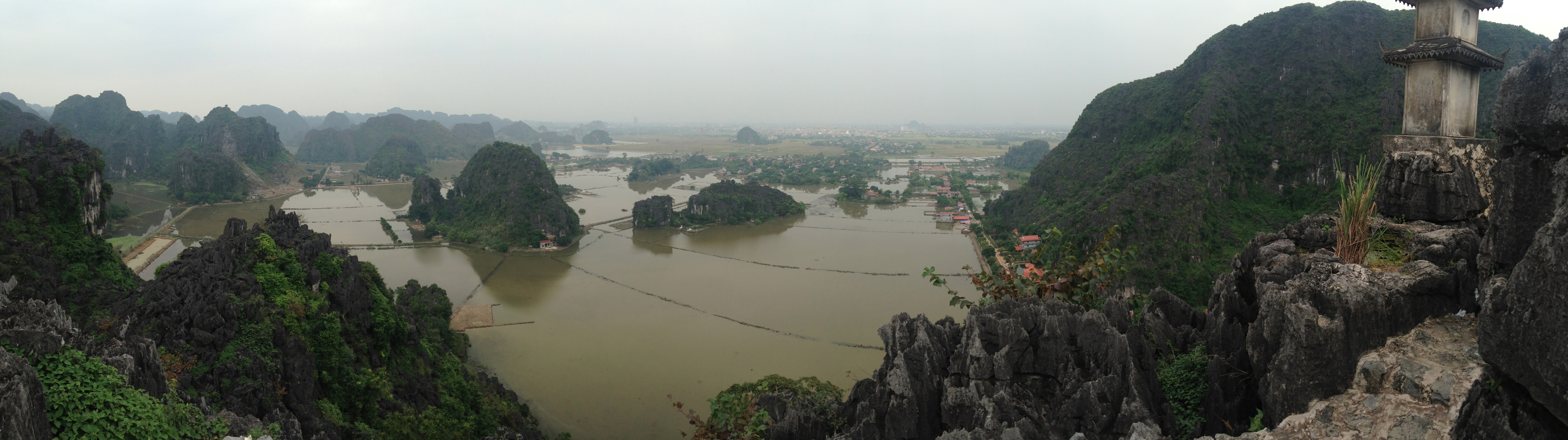
Khê Hạ village and paddies
