= Non Nước =

Non Nước may refer to:

- Non Nước Village, marble cutter village and caves near the beach in Da Nang.
- Non Nước Beach, large white sandy beach in Đà Nẵng
- Non Nước Pagoda (Hanoi), at Sóc Sơn, Hanoi
- Non Nước Hill, river-island in Ninh Bình
  - Non Nước Pagoda (Ninh Bình), on the hill in the river
- Non Nước Bridge, new concrete bridge over the River Đáy
