= Hoa Lư Ancient Capital =

Provincial city and historical capital of Vietnam

Hoa Lư Ancient Capital Cố đô Hoa Lư, 故都華閭
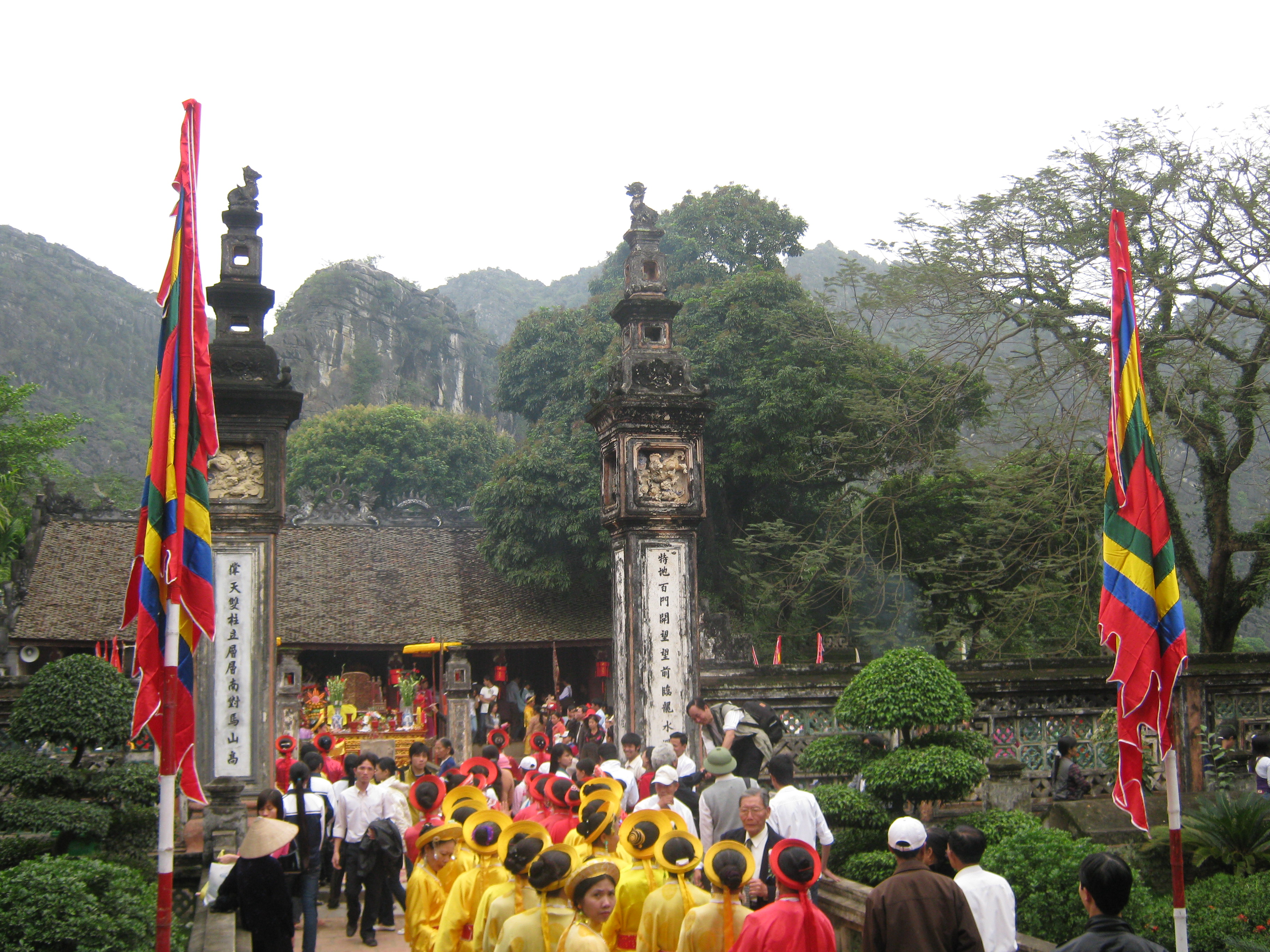
- Festival at the temple of Đinh Tiên Hoàng

- Location within Vietnam Location within Asia
- Coordinates: 20°17′10″N 105°54′24″E

Area
  - Total: 3 km^{2} (1.2 sq mi)

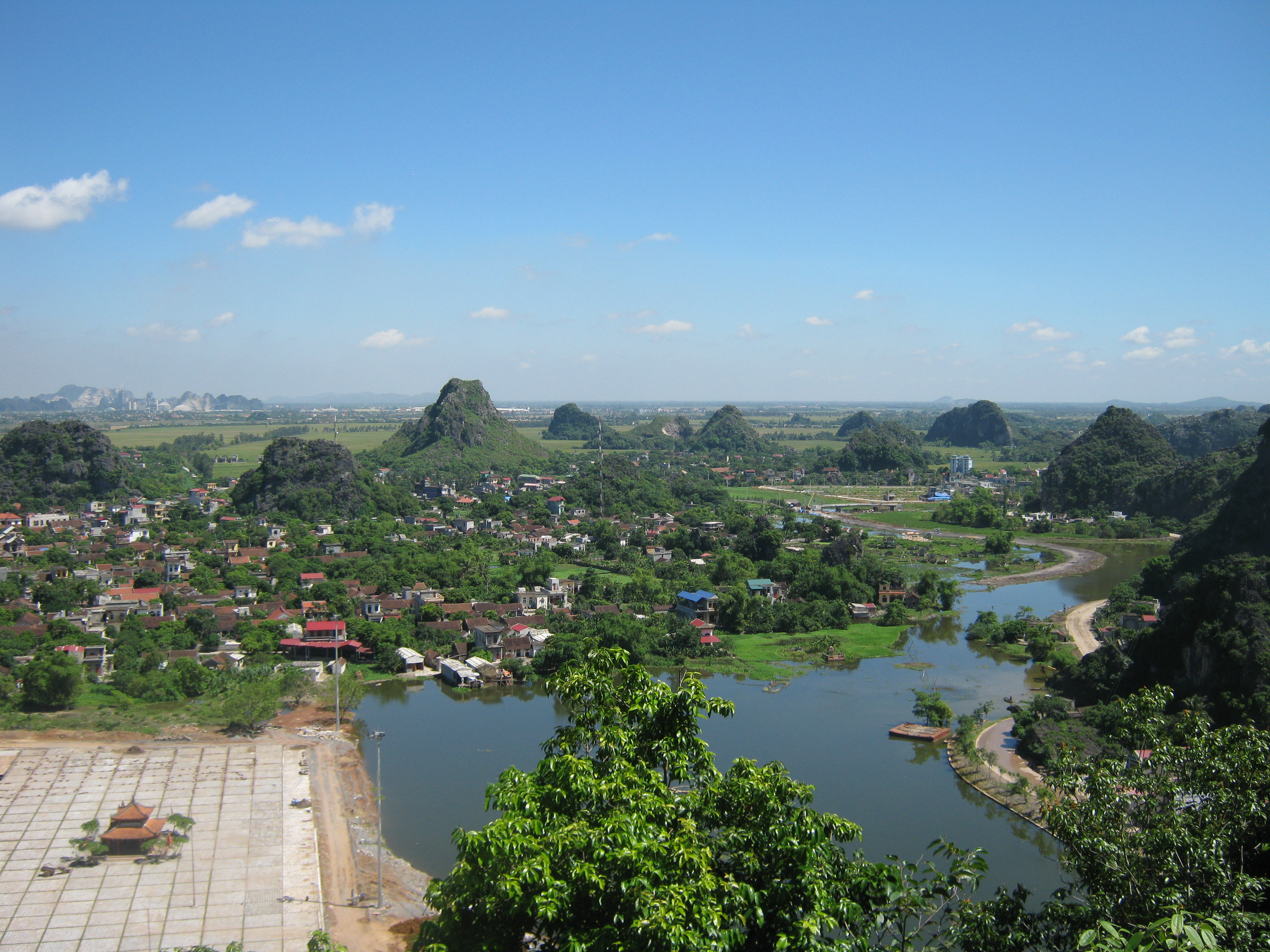
River gateway to the ancient capital of Hoa Lư

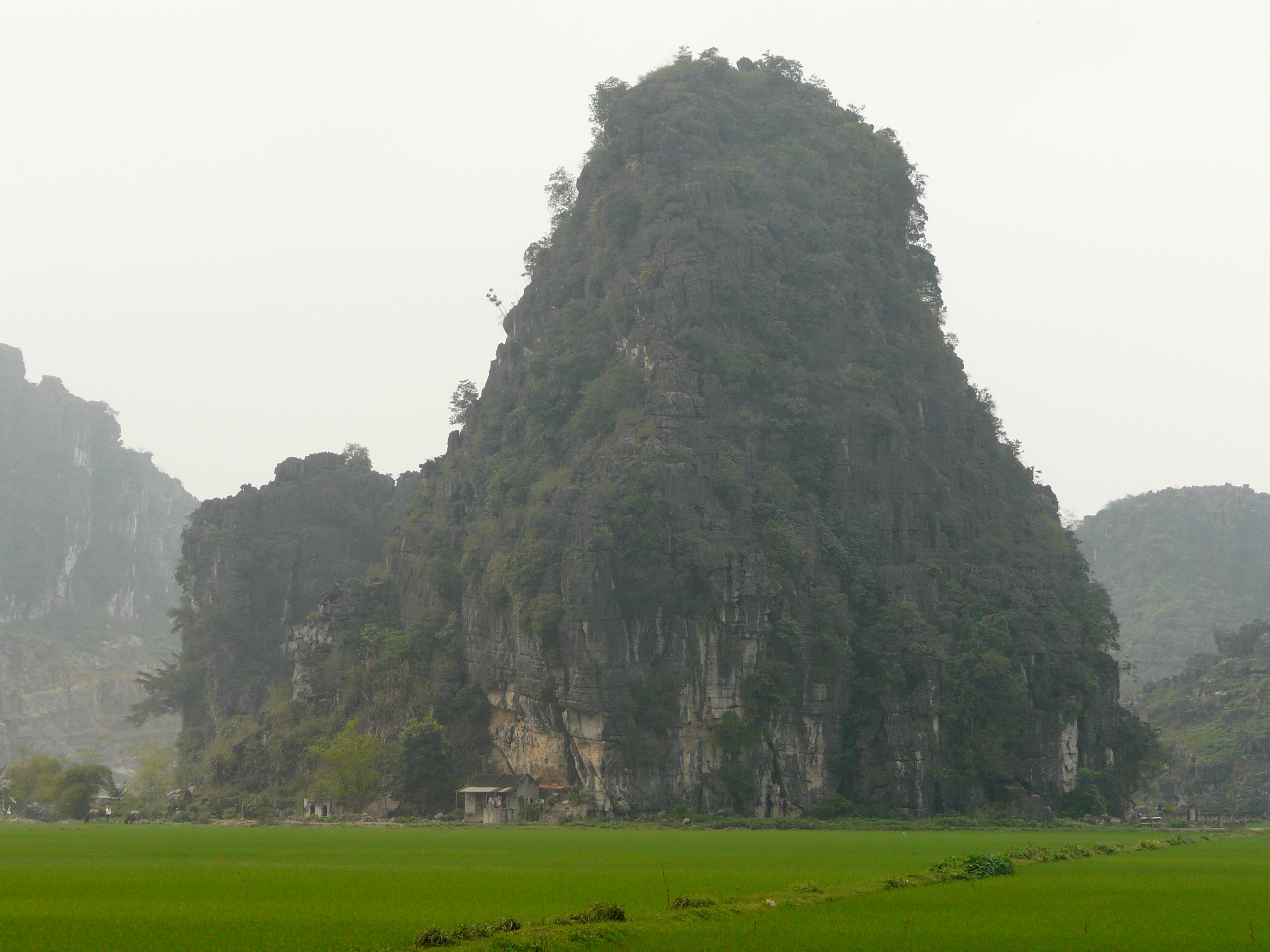
Typical limestone mountain in the area of Hoa Lư

Hoa Lư was the capital of Vietnam from 968 to 1010. It lies in Trường Yên Thượng village, Hoa Lư, Ninh Bình Province. The area is one of ricefields broken by limestone mountains, and is approximately 90 km south of Hanoi. Together with Phát Diệm Cathedral, Tam Cốc-Bích Động, Bái Đính Temple, Tràng An, and Cúc Phương, Hoa Lư is a tourist destinations in Ninh Bình Province.

In the late 10th century, Hoa Lư was the capital as well as the economic, political and cultural center of Đại Cồ Việt, an independent Vietnamese polity founded in 968 A.D. by the local warlord Đinh Bộ Lĩnh (posthumously known as Đinh Tiên Hoàng, or "First Dinh Emperor"), following years of civil war and a violent secessionist movement against China's Southern Han dynasty. Hoa Lư was the native land of the first two imperial dynasties of Vietnam: the Đinh founded by Đinh Tiên Hoàng, and the Early Lê founded by Lê Đại Hành. Following the demise of the Lê dynasty, in 1010 Lý Công Uẩn, the founder of the Lý dynasty, transferred the capital to Thăng Long (now Hanoi), and Hoa Lư became known as the "ancient capital."

The capital at Hoa Lư covered an area of 300 ha (3.0 km^{2}), including both the Inner and Outer Citadels. It included defensive earthen walls, palaces, temples and shrines, and was surrounded and protected by mountains of limestone. Today, the ancient citadel no longer exists, and few vestiges of the 10th century remain. Visitors can see temples built in honor of the emperors Đinh Tiên Hoàng and Lê Đại Hành, their sons, and Queen Dương Vân Nga, who was married first to Đinh Tiên Hoàng and then to Lê Đại Hành. The tomb of Đinh Tiên Hoàng is located on nearby Mã Yên mountain, while the tomb of Lê Đại Hành lies at the foot of the mountain.

== Layout and topography ==
The ancient capital of Hoa Lư was located in a flat valley between small but steep limestone mountains that created virtually impenetrable barriers to human traffic. Even today, many of the mountains are accessible only to the mountain goats that roam the area.

The 10th century rulers of Đại Cồ Việt took advantage of this topography in order to design enclosures that would be especially difficult to attack. In order to block the gaps between the limestone mountains, they ordered the construction of earthen walls reinforced and anchored in the soft earth by wooden stakes. In all, the capital was protected by ten sections of wall, the longest being 500m in length and the shortest 65m in length. They were approximately 10m high and 15m thick. Several sections of wall still exist and have been excavated by archeologists.

During the time it served as the capital, Hoa Lư's defenses were never actually tested by an enemy army. In 972, the king of Champa sent a fleet against Hoa Lư, but it was devastated by a storm as it tried to enter the river system from the sea and was forced to return home with great loss. In 981, two Chinese armies of the Song dynasty invaded the Đại Cồ Việt with the aim of eventually working their way south and taking the capital, but they were stopped and defeated in the northern part of the country.

The ancient capital at Hoa Lư consists of two separate enclosures, the Inner Citadel which lies to the west and the Outer Citadel which lies to the east, and which includes most of the sites visited by tourists. The two citadels are separated by a limestone mountain. Both have access to the Hoàng Long ("Golden Dragon") River that runs just north-west of the capital and that, via a system of rivers, connects Hoa Lư to the sea. In the 10th century, the dwellings of the common people, as well as the markets and the storehouses connected with the river trade, were concentrated near the river.

== Monuments in the area ==
The area of the ancient imperial capital of Hoa Lư features several dozen monuments, including the following:

- Đinh Tiên Hoàng Temple
- Lê Đại Hành Temple
- Đinh Tiên Hoàng Tomb
- Lê Đại Hành Tomb
- Nhật Trụ Pagoda
- Noi Lam Temple
- Bái Đính Temple
- Thiên Tôn Cave
- Trang An Grottoes
- Ban Long Pagoda

=== Temple of Đinh Tiên Hoàng ===
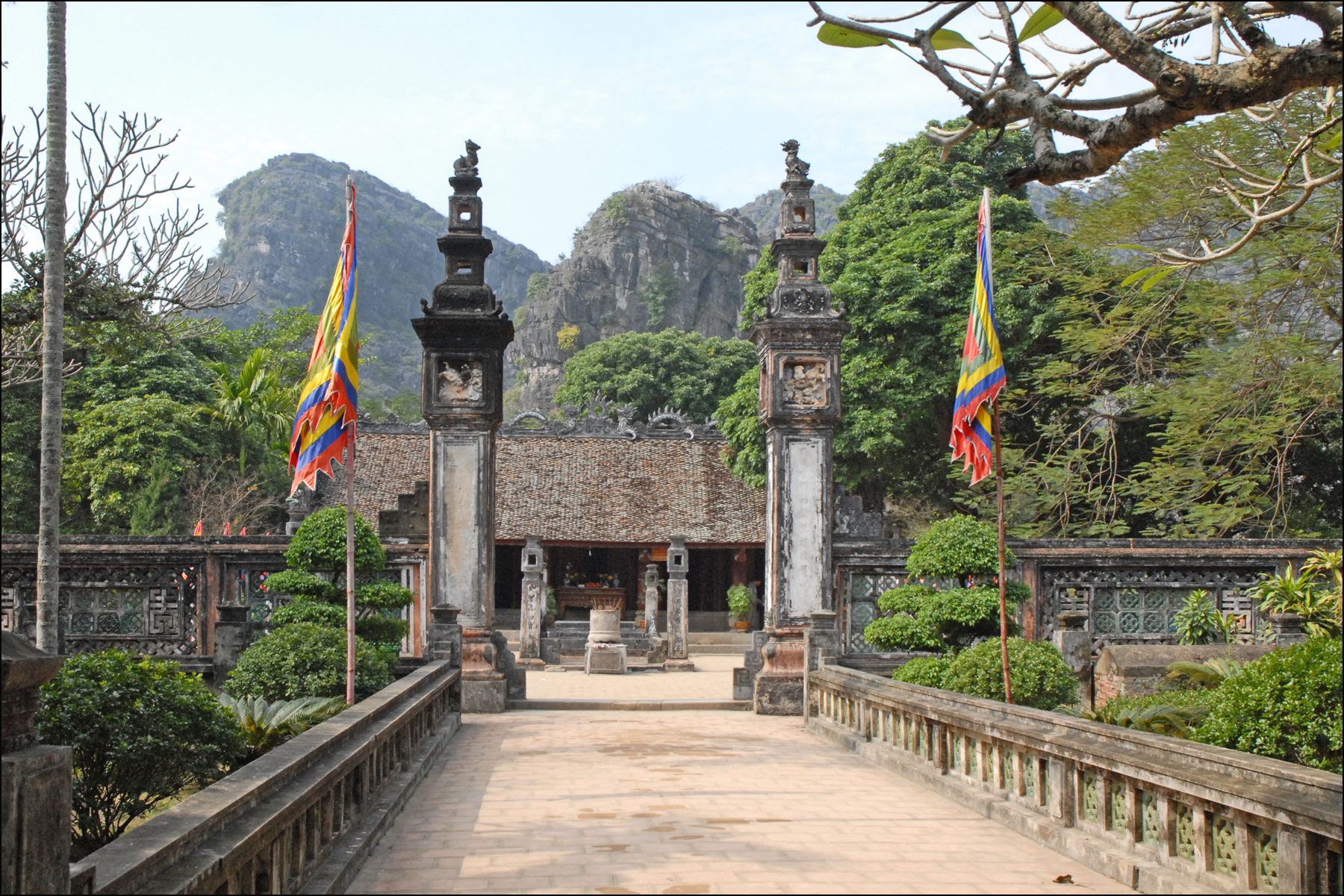
The temple of Đinh Tiên Hoàng at Hoa Lư

The temple dedicated to Đinh Tiên Hoàng was constructed by local residents near the center of the old capital in order to honor Dinh Bo Linh, the emperor who founded the Đinh Dynasty in Vietnamese history. Bộ Lĩnh grew up in this area in the mid-10th century during the reign of Ngô Quyền, a warlord who evicted Chinese occupiers from the country and declared himself king in 938. Born into the family of a high-level official, Bộ Lĩnh soon revealed his talent for government and military affairs; his childhood exploits as the leader of local children waging mock wars against the children of other villages are legendary. As he reached maturity, he also became a powerful warlord. Following the crumbling of the short-lived Ngô dynasty founded by Ngô Quyền, he defeated twelve rival warlords, reunified the country, and in 968 founded the first imperial dynasty of Vietnam. Unfortunately, due to Đinh Tiên Hoàng's failure to provide for an orderly succession, the country was again plunged into turmoil after his death, until order was reestablished by Lê Hoàn, Bộ Lĩnh's top general, who defeated his rivals and established the Early Lê dynasty, Vietnam's second imperial dynasty.

The temple to Đinh Tiên Hoàng is located on the grounds of the former main palace of the royal citadel. The location is in the "tiên thủy hậu sơn" style incorporating the principles of "phong thủy" (Chinese: "feng shui"), with a river to the front and a mountain at the back. The temple was designed in the "nội công ngoại quốc" style.

=== Temple of Lê Đại Hành ===
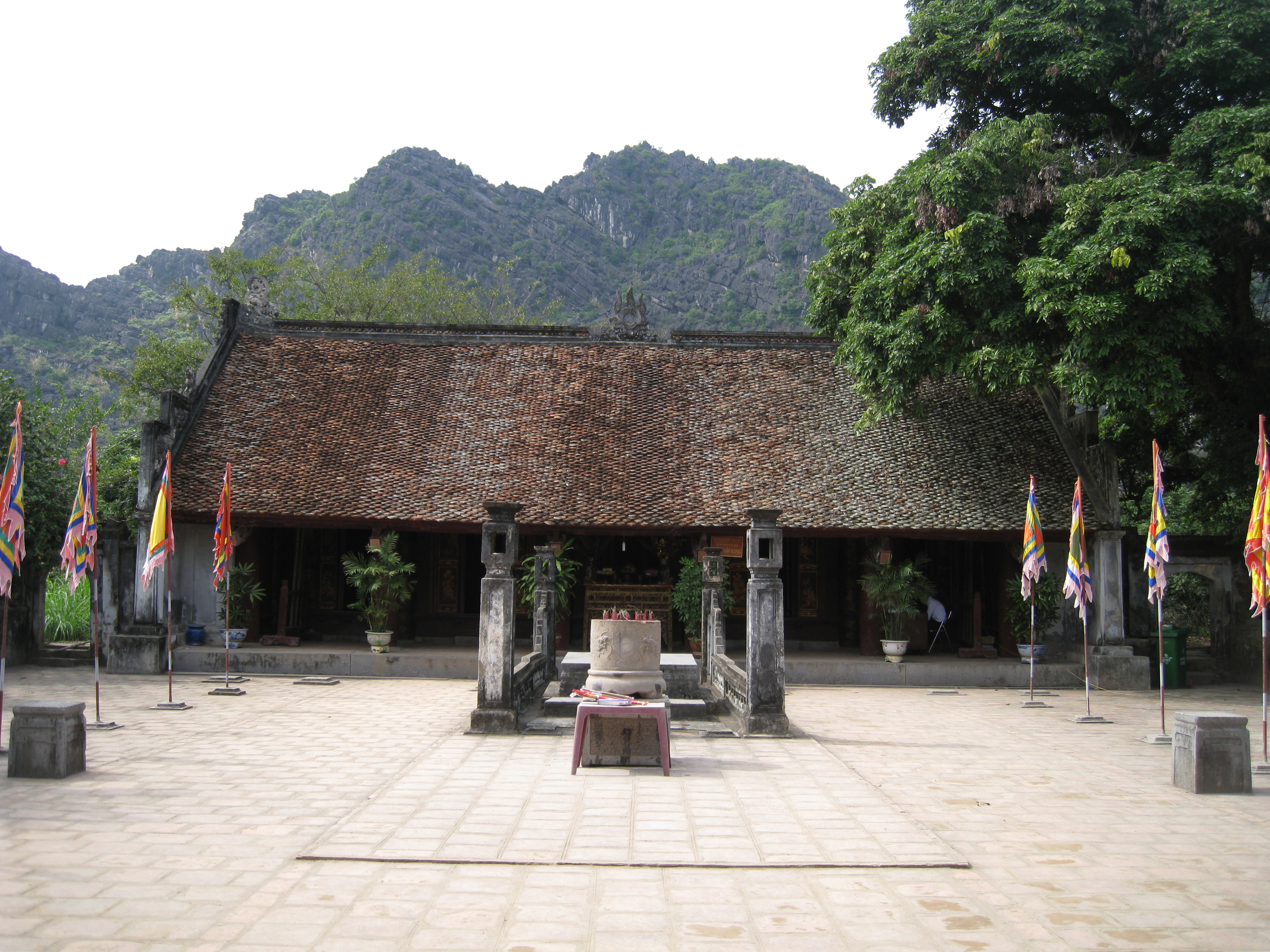
The temple of Lê Đại Hành at Hoa Lư

The temple of Lê Đại Hành is 300m north of the temple of Đinh Tiên Hoàng, in Trường Yên Commune, Hoa Lư District, and has Den Mountain as a backdrop. Lê Hoàn occupied the highest military post in the administration of Đinh Bộ Lĩnh. When Bộ Lĩnh was assassinated in 979, his six-year-old son Đinh Toàn took the throne, and Lê Hoàn served as his regent. Suspecting that Lê Hoàn was secretly planning to take over the country himself, other leading men went into rebellion. The ensuing disorder raised eyebrows at the court of the Chinese Song dynasty, which had been seeking an opportunity to reassert dominion over Vietnam following the eviction of Chinese forces by Ngô Quyền in 938. Lê Hoàn defeated his rivals, and with a Chinese invasion impending, obtained support for his takeover, declaring himself emperor and founding the Lê dynasty. He also married Đinh Tiên Hoàng's widow Dương Vân Nga, the mother of the deposed child king Đinh Toàn. In 982, his forces defeated and repelled two Chinese armies, thus ensuring the country's ongoing independence. Following his death in 1005, Lê Hoàn came to be known by the posthumous name "Lê Đại Hành". His sons fought over the succession, and order was not restored until Lý Công Uẩn took over the country in 1010 and declared the Lý dynasty.

The architecture, art, and devotional statues of the temple to Lê Đại Hành are similar to those of the temple of Đinh Tiên Hoàng. The constructions does not have stone-doorsteps and stones for propping the pillar as Emperor Đinh Tiên Hoàng's Temple. Hence, we can contemplate the temple with adequate example of the architecture and sculpture of Post-Lê dynasty period.

The "Chính Cung" part of the Emperor Lê Đại Hành Temple comprises five structural chambers. The middle chamber has a statue of Emperor Lê Đại Hành sitting on his throne and wearing a Binh Thien Hat; his face is hearty. The statue is placed on a pedestal. To its left is a statue of Empress Dương Vân Nga, who was a wife, first of Đinh Tiên Hoàng, and later of Lê Đại Hành. The statue of Empress Dương Vân Nga has a plump and charming face, ruddy skin, and many features of Viet women of that time. Her outer robe is sculpted with supple creases, loosened so as to reveal the inside of the blouse with its special patterns. Her statue displays feminine virtues and youthful qualities designed to project an image of an enthusiastic, talented, keen and beautiful woman.

=== Nhất Trụ Temple ===
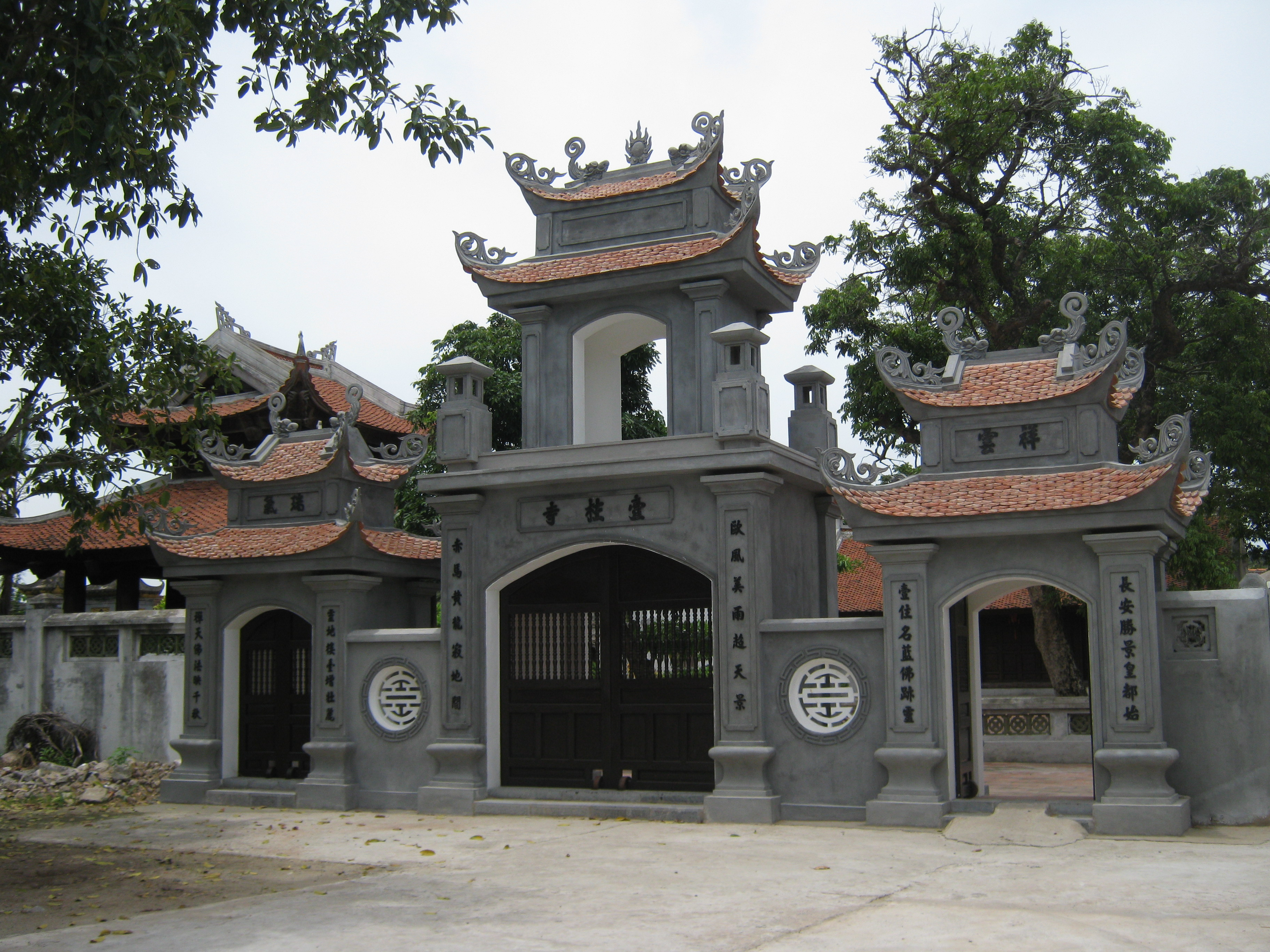
Nhất Trụ Pagoda at Hoa Lư

The construction of Chùa Nhất Trụ ("First Column Pagoda") was ordered by Emperor Lê Đại Hành. Later, Emperor Lý Thái Tông ordered the construction of a similar temple in Hanoi. The temple is still in existence and holds many artifacts from the 10th and 11th centuries. One of the most prominent original features of the architecture is the stone pillar in the temple courtyard.

=== Temple of Đinh Tiên Hoàng's daughter ===
A small temple near Nhất Trụ Pagoda is dedicated to Princess Phất Kim, the daughter of Đinh Tiên Hoàng. When Đinh Tiên Hoàng had subdued Warlord Ngô Nhật Khánh, he gave the princess to Khánh in marriage to solidify the political alliance. However, Khánh fled with the princess to the neighboring Champa kingdom in the south, plotting to attack the Hoa Lư court. A year later, after Ngô Nhật Khánh's invasion was thwarted when his fleet was shipwrecked by a storm, the princess returned to the imperial court. She was subsequently detained or punished within the palace and was eventually sent to Nhất Trụ Pagoda to become a Buddhist nun. When her father the emperor was assassinated in 979, the princess committed suicide by jumping into a well near the pagoda. The pagoda dedicated the well to her honor.

=== Thiên Tôn Cave ===
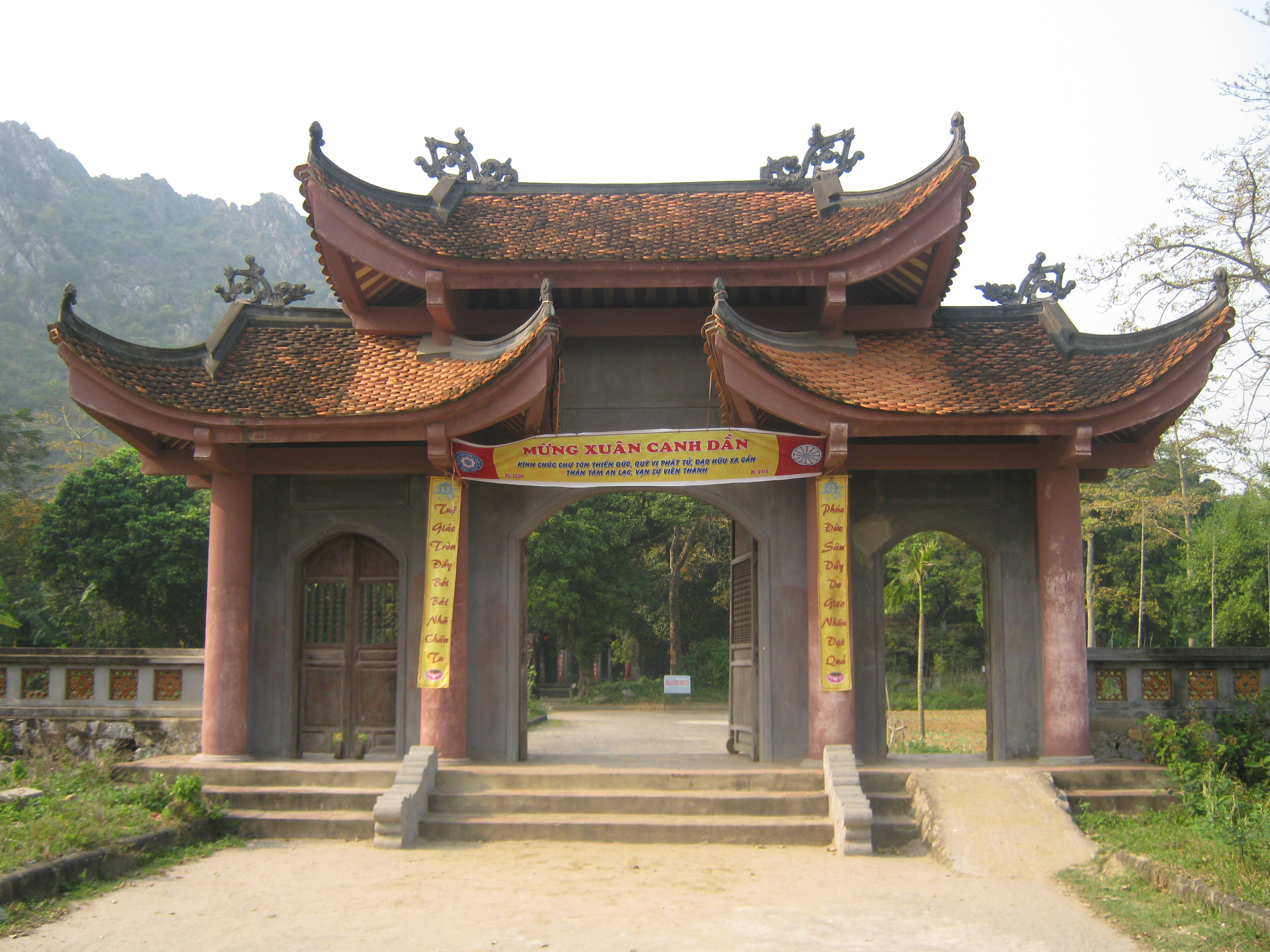
Thiên Tôn Cave

Legend has it that Đinh Bộ Lĩnh ventured into this cave and received an oracle while he was struggling for control of the country with twelve rival warlords. He made offerings to the local deity, who foretold that in the end Bộ Lĩnh would conquer all of his enemies. The oracle turned out to be true: in 968, Đinh Bộ Lĩnh defeated the last of the twelve warlords and unified the country under his personal rule as the first emperor of Vietnam.

The entire cave area presents a serene scene with many fruit trees. Thiên Tôn Cave has two chambers: the outer chamber is large while the inner one is narrower. The outer chamber of the cave is dedicated to the worship of Buddha; the inner cave is where immortals are venerated. Thus, Thiên Tôn is a bi-religious complex combining the Buddhist element of the outer chamber and the Daoist element of the inner complex. Many valuable objects are displayed inside the cave, such as a bell cast during the reign of Emperor Lê Hiển Tông of the Later Lê dynasty, a statue of Thiên Tôn, and groups of lacquered and gilded Buddhist statues. A unique feature of Thiên Tôn Cave is that all of the objects of worship and architectural details, including the pillars and the altars, were sculpted in the rocks, with stylized images of dragons, the motifs of the Lý dynasty.

== The annual festival of Hoa Lư ==
Hoa Lư hosts an annual festival in the third month of the lunar year. A procession starting at Hoang Long river winds its way to the temples of the two kings, Đinh Tiên Hoàng (Đinh Bộ Lĩnh) and Lê Đại Hành (Lê Hoàn). The festival includes ceremonies, games and a fair. It commemorates the history of Vietnam between 968, the year in which Đinh Bộ Lĩnh proclaimed himself emperor, and 1010, the year in which Lý Công Uẩn moved the capital from Hoa Lư to the area of Hanoi. The local people of Truong Yen village produce a play about the childhood exploits of Đinh Tiên Hoàng.

The King Lê Đại Hành Temple Festival commemorates Lê Hoàn, the founder of the Early Lê dynasty, and includes ritual ceremonies at his temple. Boat racing events on the Hoang Long River are organized during festival periods as part of local communal activities. Festivals are also held at Thái Vi Temple, located in the former royal retreat of Vũ Lâm, which is associated with the Trần dynasty.

== Gallery ==
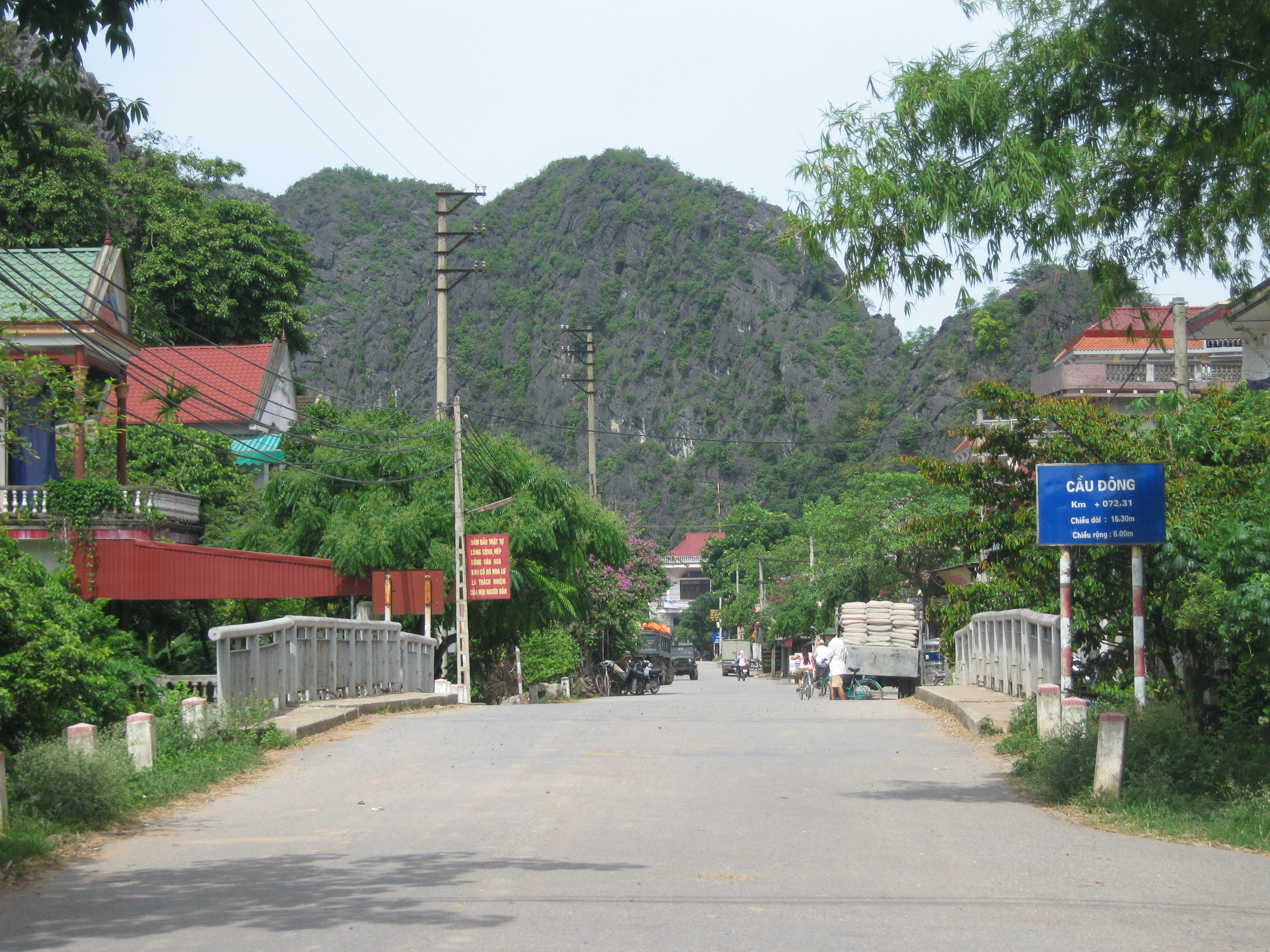
Hoa Lư Street Bridge in the east.

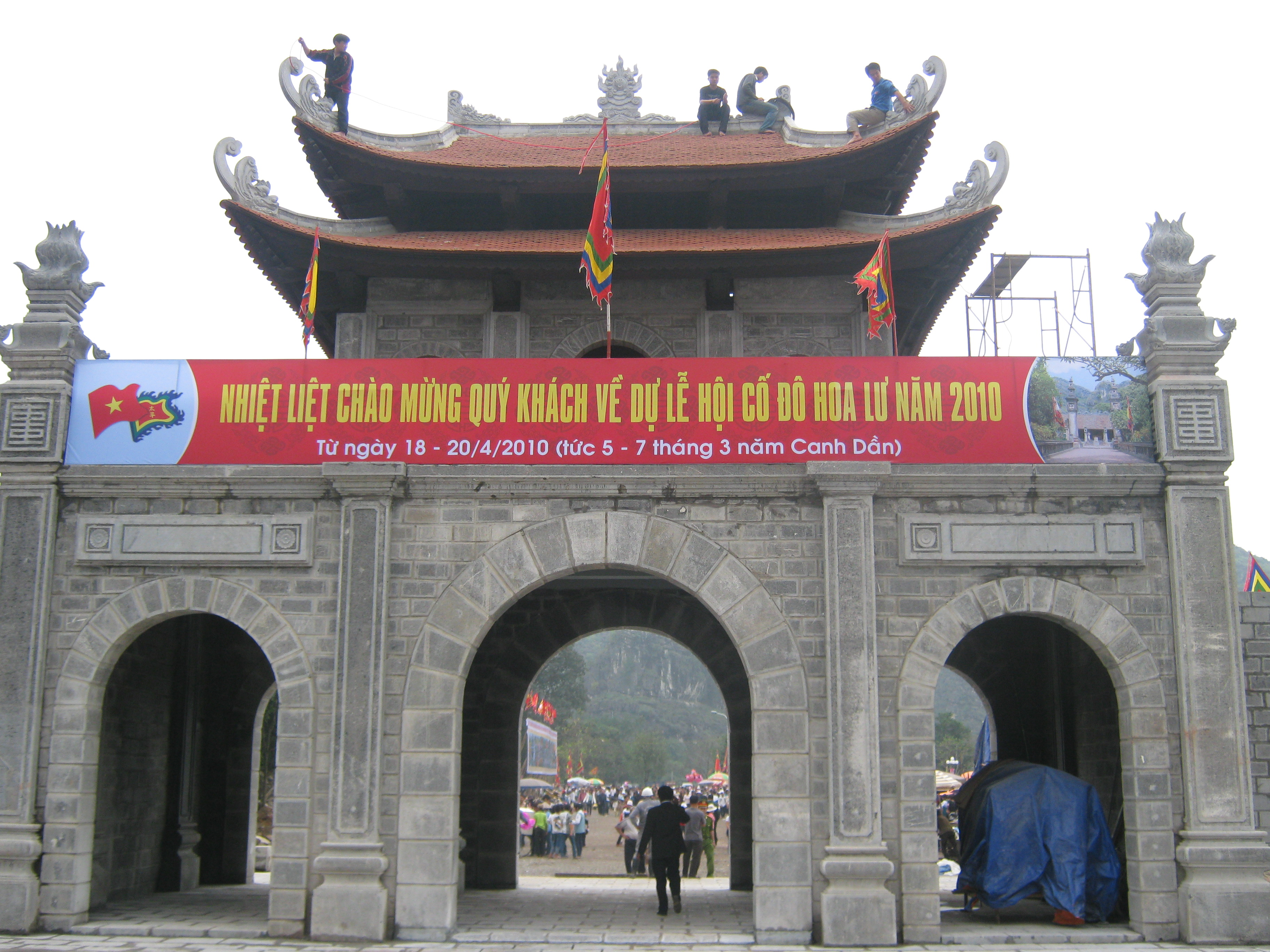
Gateway to Emperor Đinh Tiên Hoàng Temple

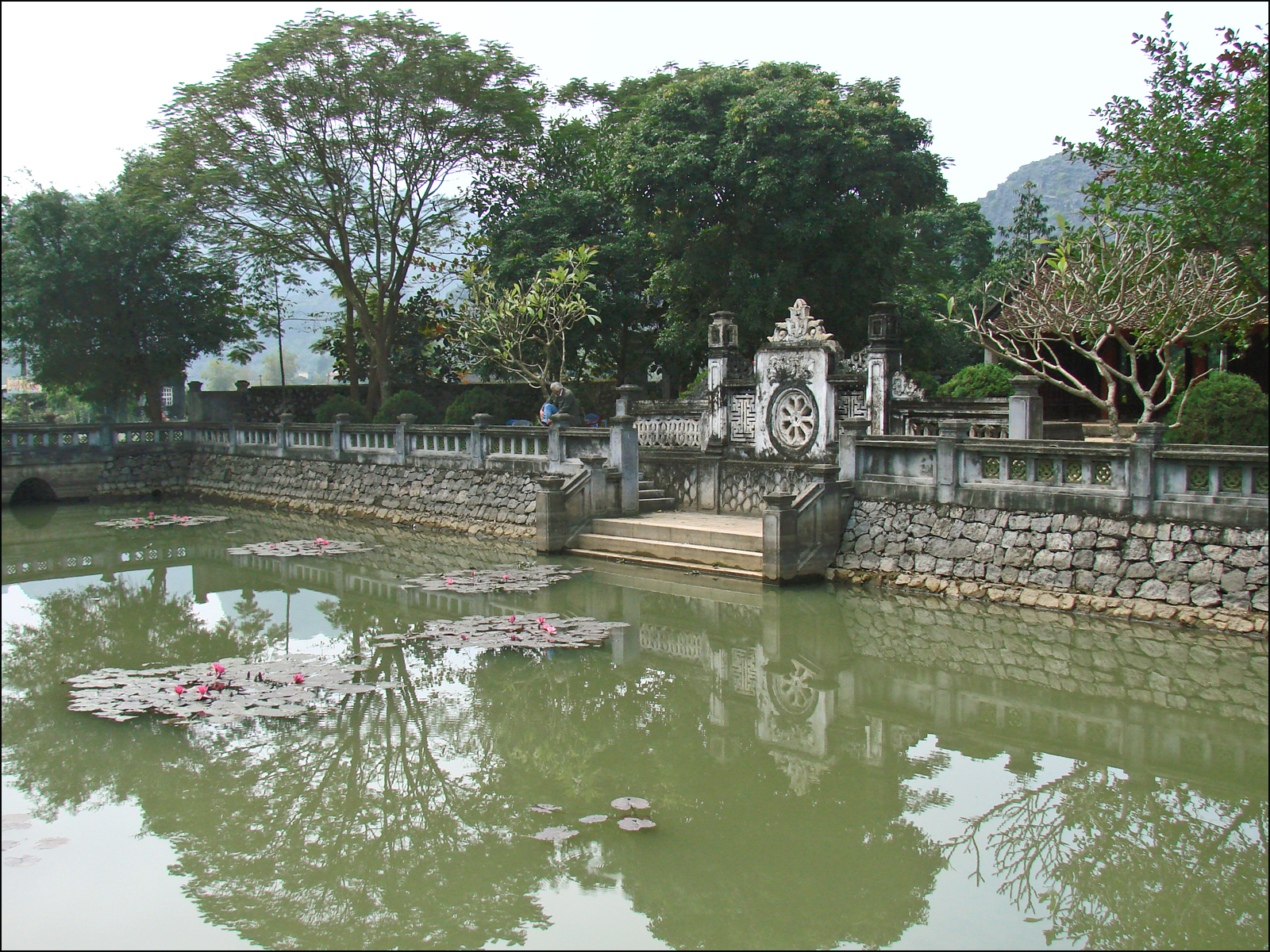
Half-moon Lake in Emperor Đinh Temple

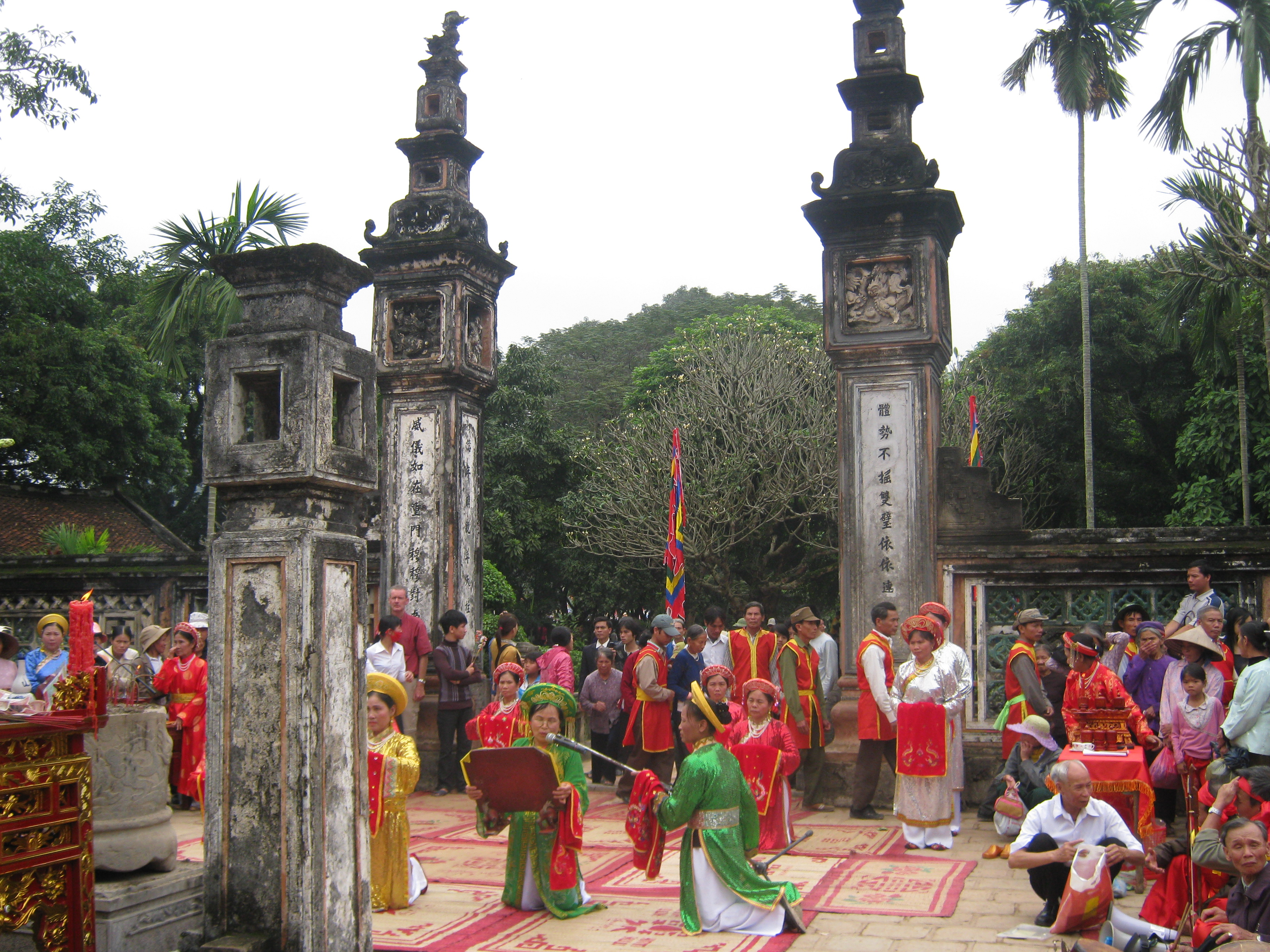
Hoa Lư ancient capital Festival

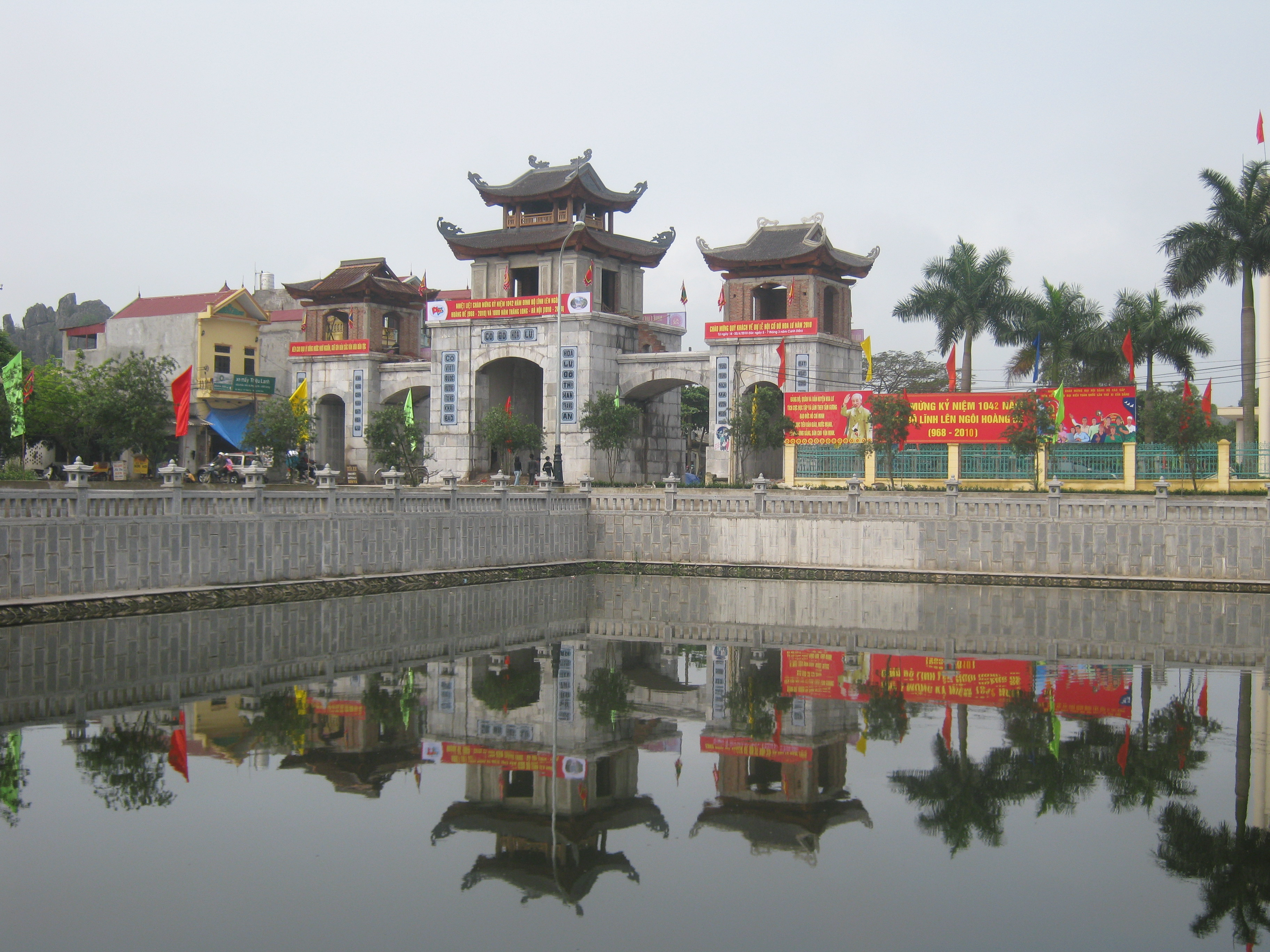
Gateway to the ancient capital of Hoa Lư

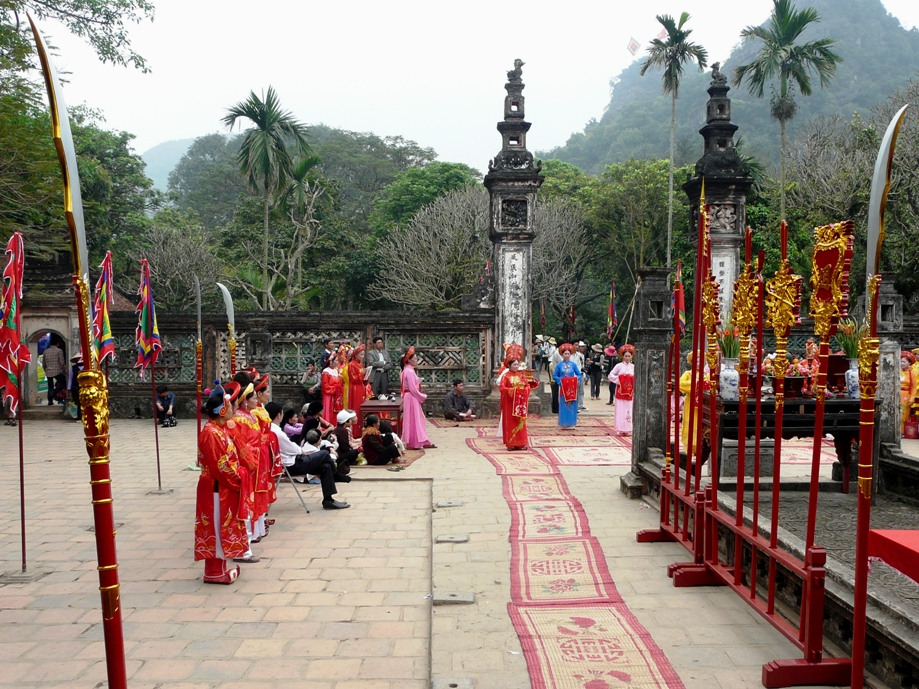
Annual festival of the Đinh and Lê Emperors, ceremony in a courtyard of the temple of Đinh Tiên Hoàng.
