= Tràng An Scenic Landscape Complex =

Trang An Landscape Complex
UNESCO World Heritage Site
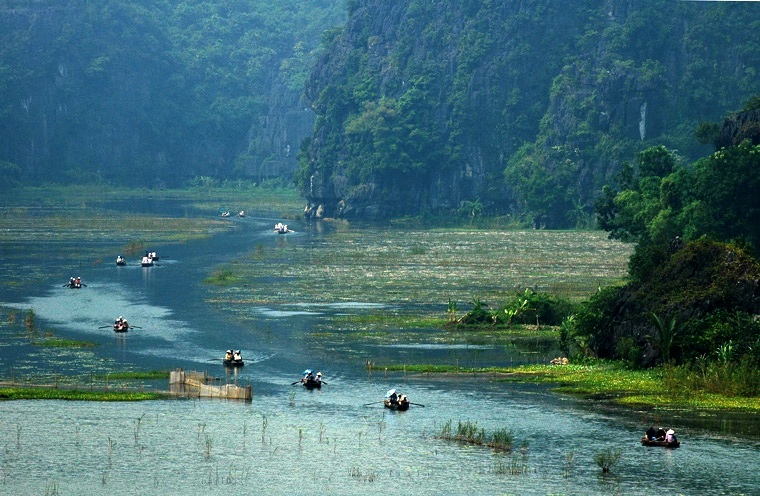
- Tam Coc landscape, part of the UNESCO heritage complex

- Location within Vietnam
- Location: Red River Delta, Vietnam
- Criteria: Cultural and Natural: (v)(vii)(viii)
- Reference: 1438bis
- Inscription: 2014 (38th Session)
- Extensions: 2016
- Area: 6,226 ha (15,380 acres)
- Buffer zone: 6,026 ha (14,890 acres)
- Coordinates: 20°15′24″N 105°53′47″E

Tràng An is a scenic area located in Ninh Bình Province, near Hoa Lư, Vietnam renowned for its boat cave tours. On 23 June 2014, at the 38th session of the World Heritage Committee in Doha, the Trang An Scenic Landscape Complex was inscribed as a UNESCO World Heritage Site.

The Trang An Scenic Landscape Complex includes Hoa Lư and Tam Cốc/Bích Động.

== Location ==
Trang An wharf is located 3 km south of Hoa Lu ancient capital, 7 km from Ninh Binh city to the west along Trang An boulevard, 16 km from Tam Diep city in the north through Tam Coc. Trang An - Tam Coc zone has an area of more than 6,172 ha, which is a special protection area of scenic spots. This special protection zone is located within Hoa Lu special-use forest, belonging to Hoa Lu ancient capital preservation plan and also under the planning of Trang An World Heritage site with an area of 12,252 ha. In the Trang An landscape complex, the center of Hoa Lu ancient capital in the north, Tam Coc - Bich Dong tourist area is in the south and Trang An eco-tourism area is in the central position. These three areas are linked together by Hoa Lu special-use forest on limestone mountains and rivers, lakes and swamps

== Diverse ecosystems ==
Trang An has two main types of ecosystems: limestone mountain ecosystem and aquatic ecosystem. The biological diversity of the communities is a major factor contributing to the creation of these two ecosystems.

The natural vegetation at Hoa Lu is limestone forests and evergreen forests in valleys between limestone areas. According to the survey results of Forest Inventory and Planning Institute (FIPI) and Ninh Binh Forest Protection Department, Trang An terrestrial ecosystem has more than 600 species of plants, 200 species of animals, many of which are in Vietnam's red list. The aquatic ecosystem consists of about 30 species of zooplanktons, 40 species of benthos, including many rare species, especially striped neck turtles that need to be protected.

Trang An has more than 310 types of rare and precious plants such as cycas, sua, Indian mahogany, orchids, Chinese yam, honeysuckle, juniper, lettuce, etc. and endangered animal species such as mainland serow, leopard, phoenix pheasant.

== Gallery ==
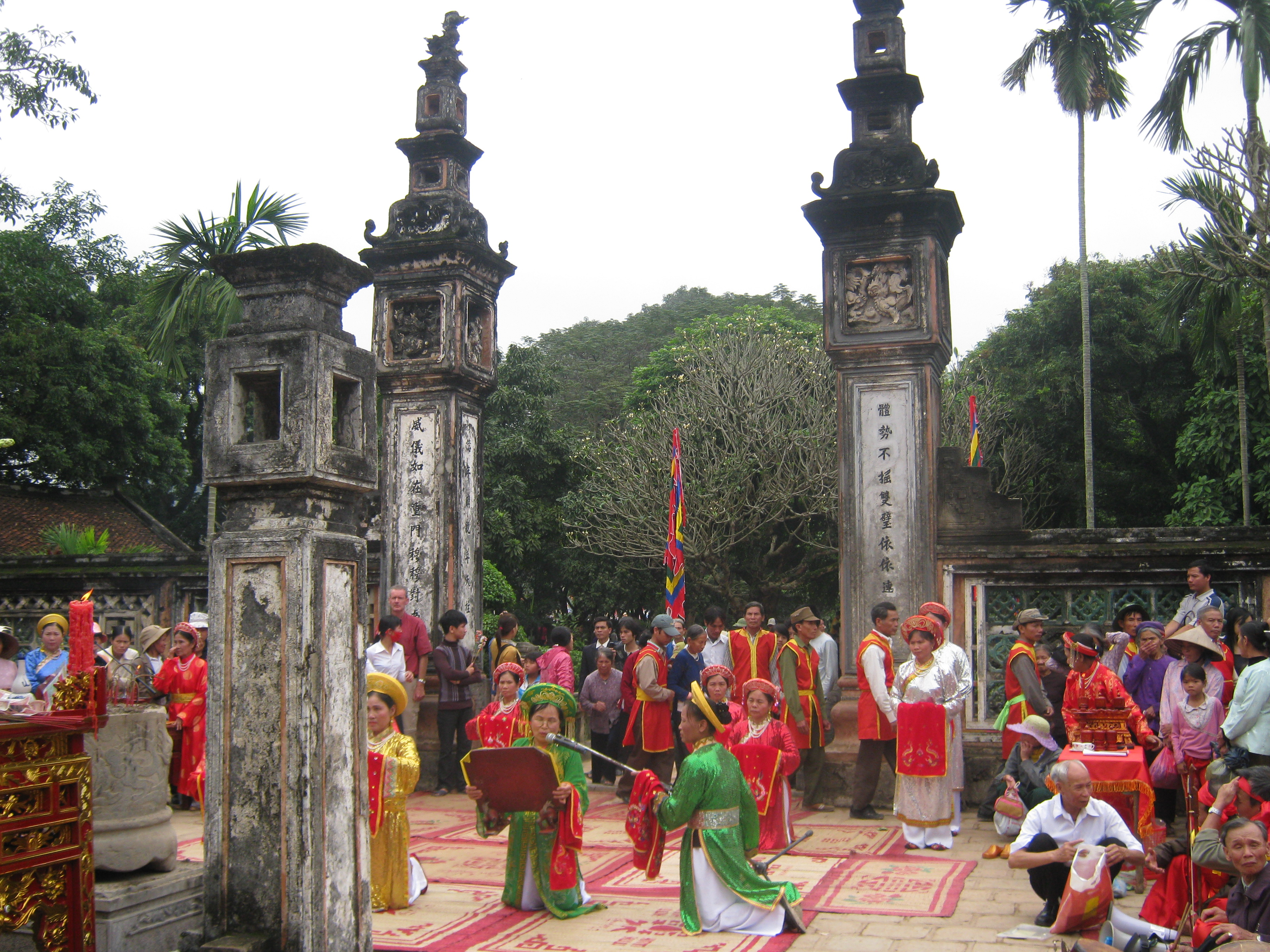
Hoa Lư ancient capital Festival

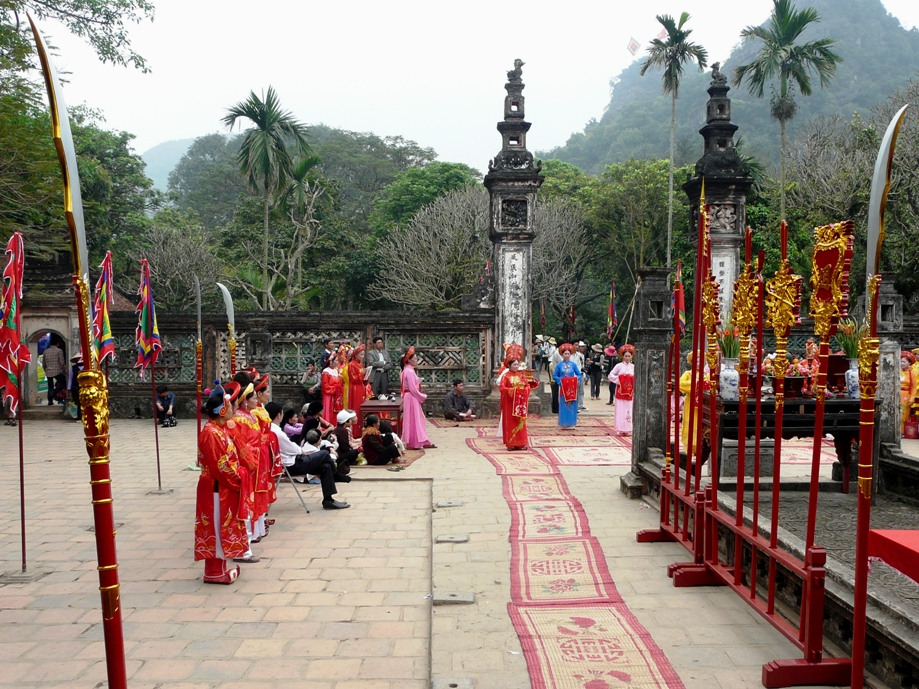
Annual festival of the Đinh and Lê kings, ceremony in a courtyard of the temple of Đinh Tiên Hoàng.

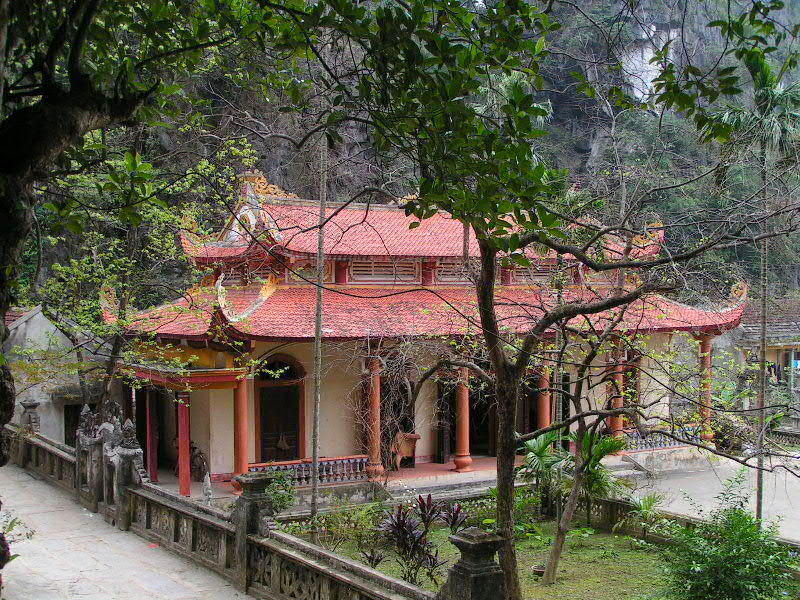
Hạ Pagoda, Ngô Đồng River

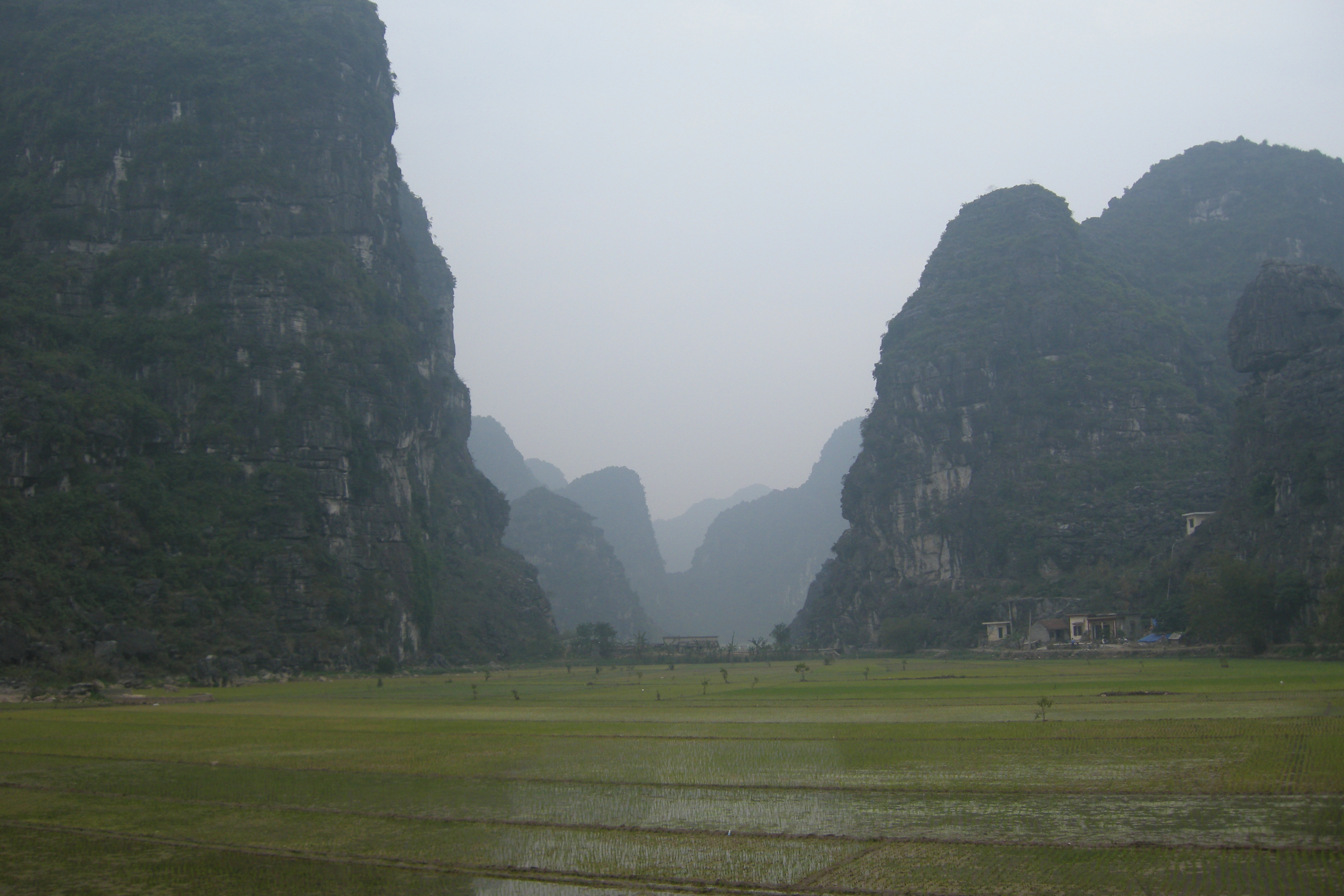
Limestone rock formations

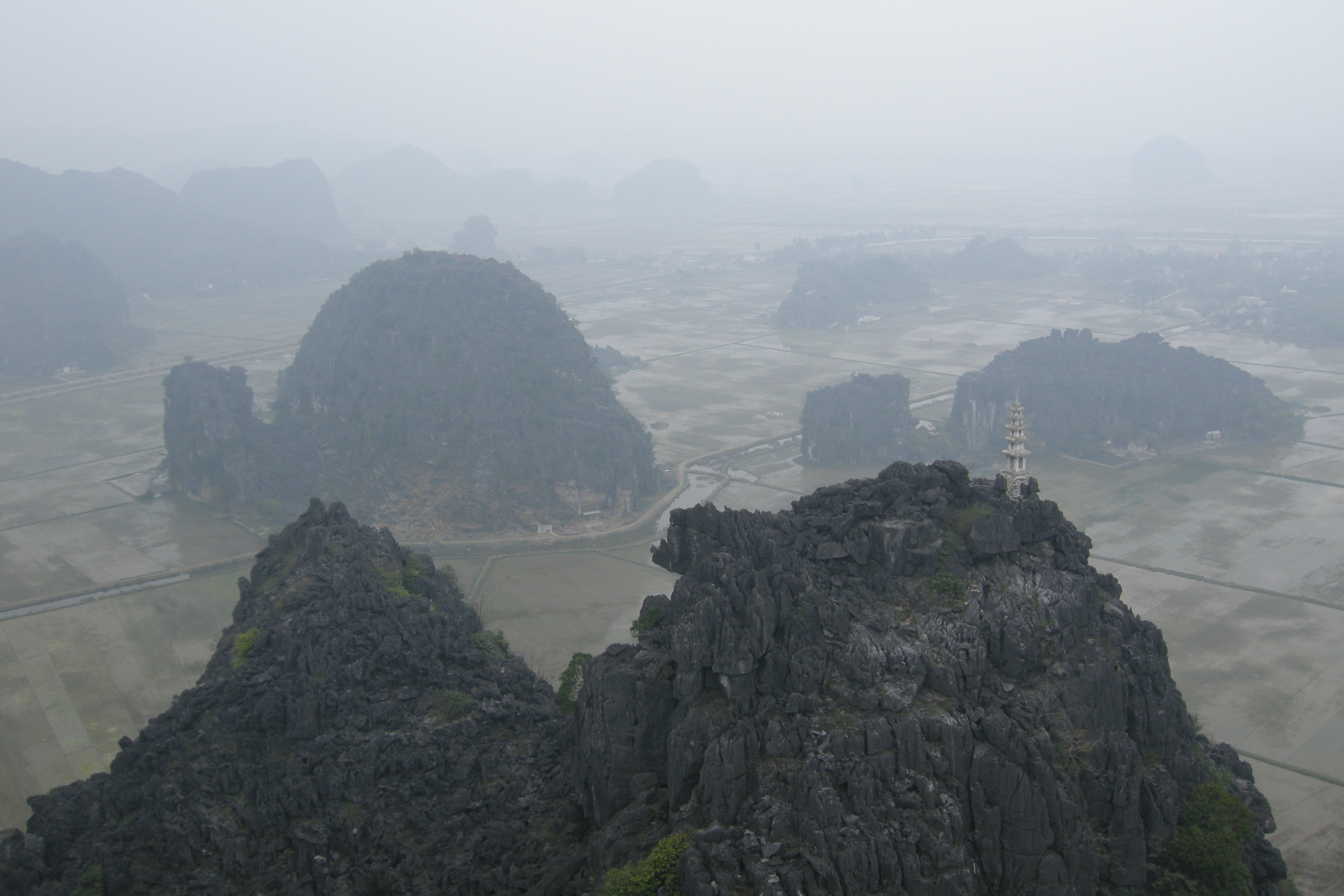
Tributaries of Ngô Đồng River

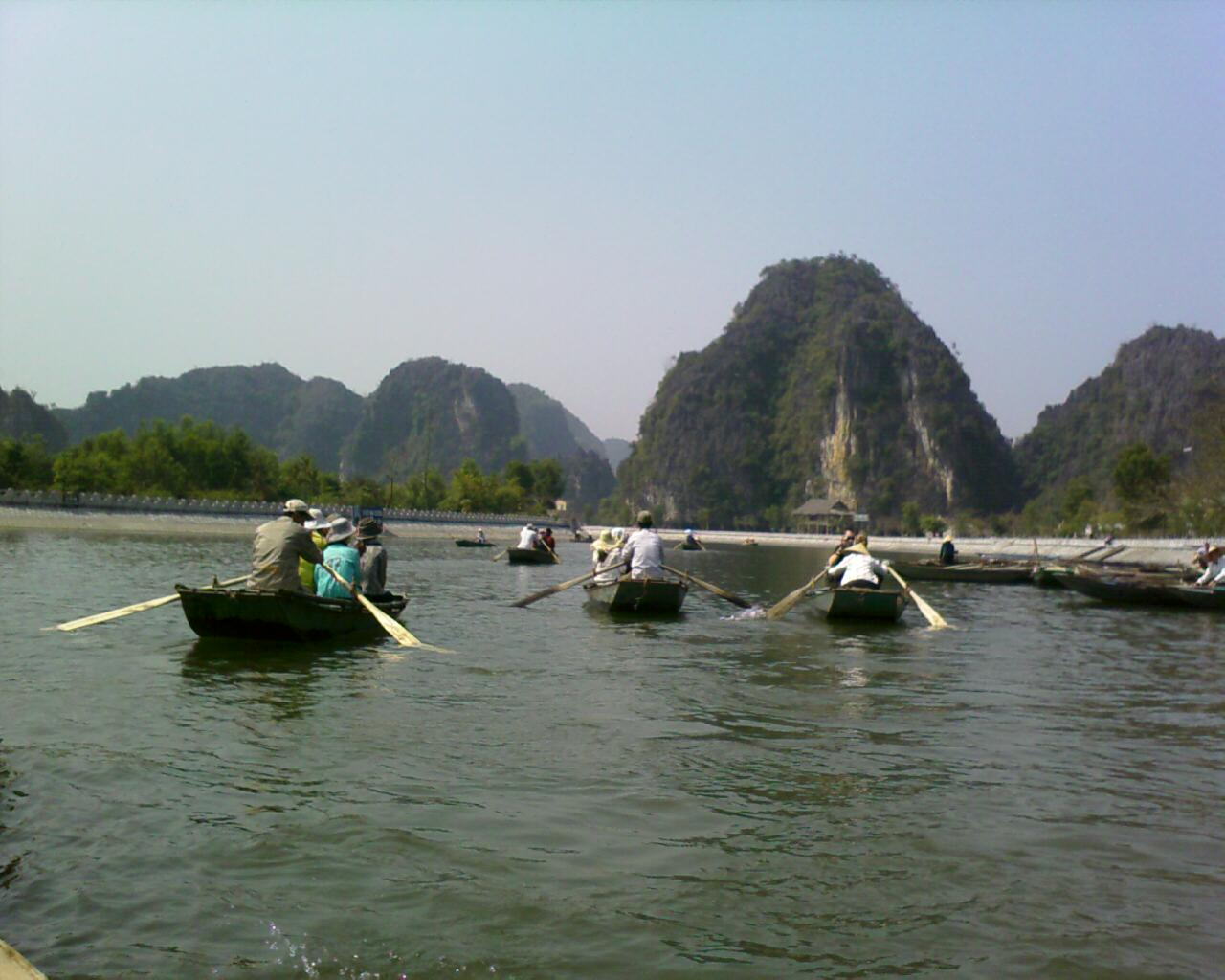
Tam Cốc in Hoa Lư Ancient Capital

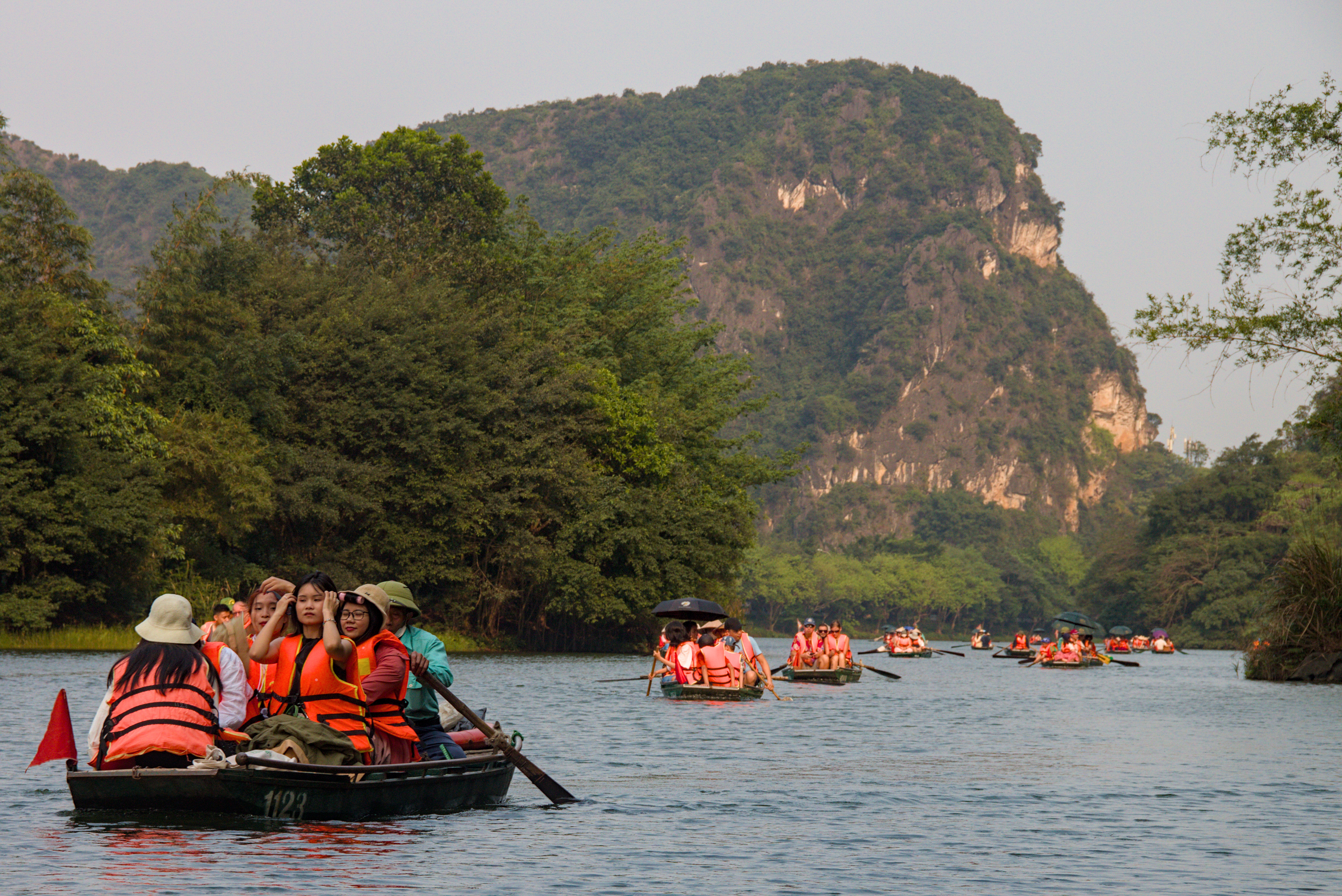
Several tourist boats on a body of water.

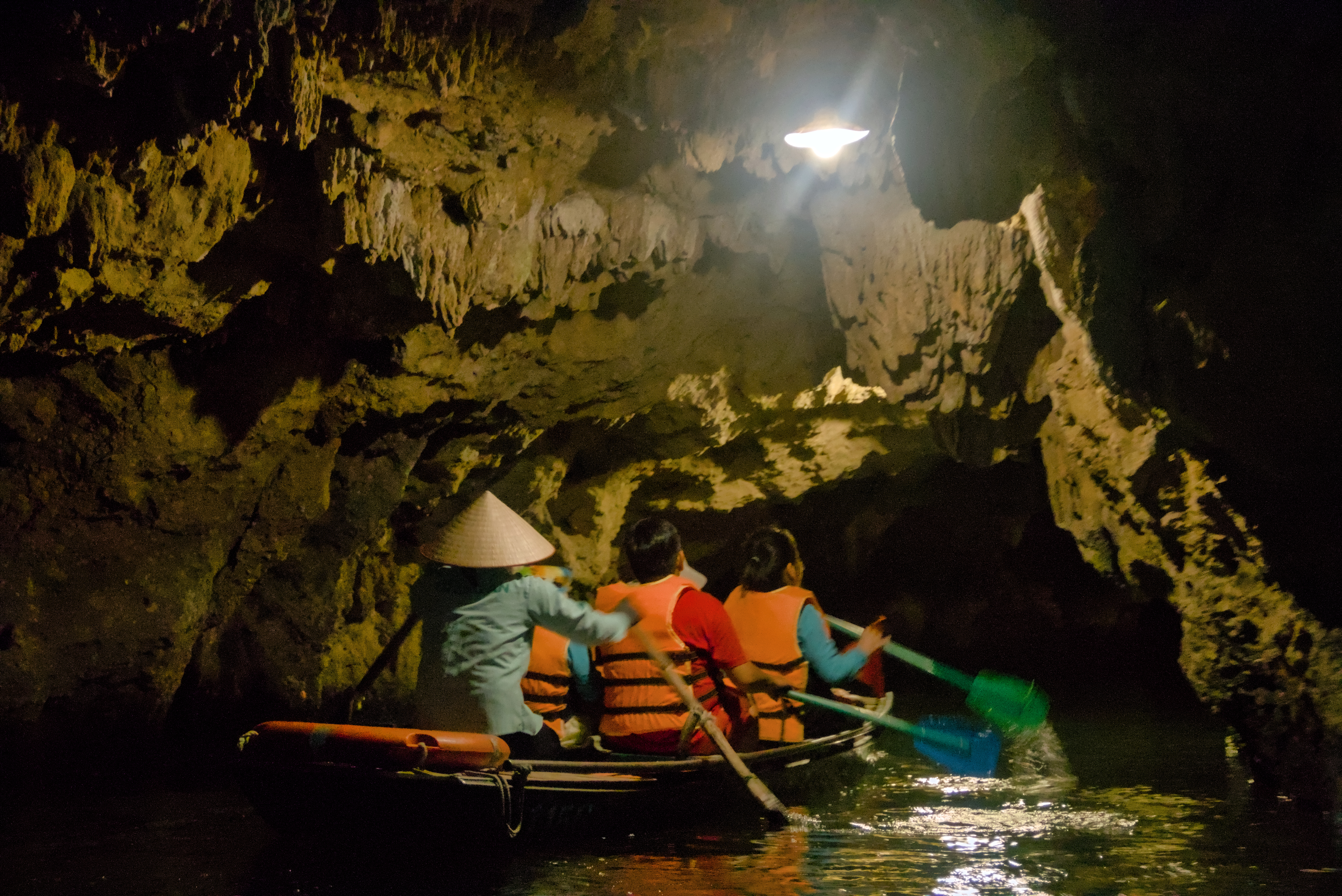
Tourist boat inside a cave.
