= Hoa Lư district =

Coordinates: 20.250°N 105.917°E

Hoa Lư district Huyện Hoa Lư
- District
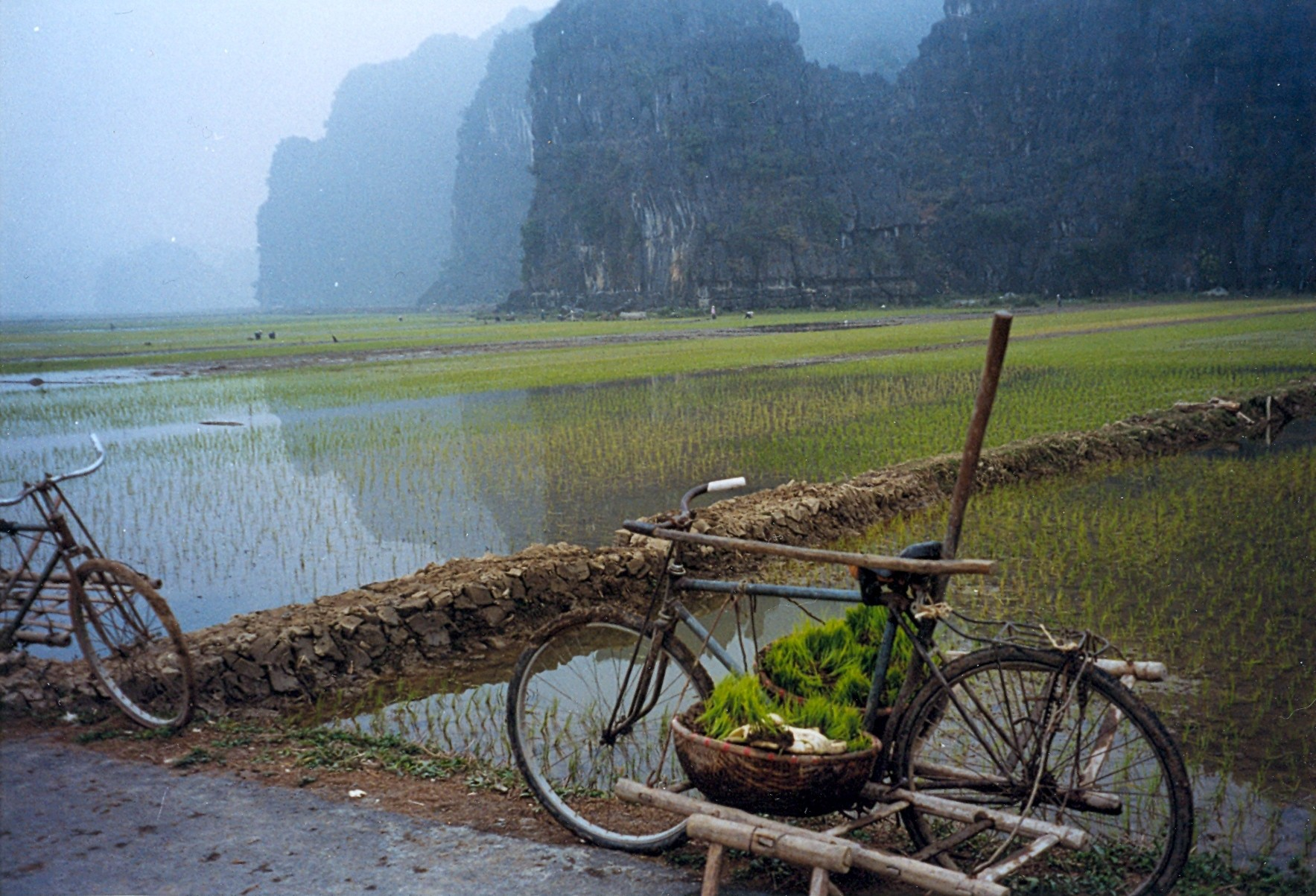
- Rice paddies in a karst landscape, Tam Cốc village, Ninh Hải commune

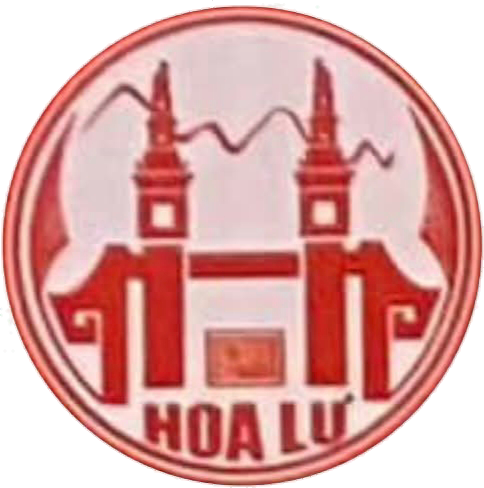
- Seal
- Interactive map of Hoa Lư district
- Country: Vietnam
- Region: Red River Delta
- Province: Ninh Bình
- Capital: Thiên Tôn

Area
  - Total: 40 sq mi (103 km^{2})

Population (2003)
  - Total: 66,932
- Time zone: UTC+7 (Indochina Time)

Hoa Lư is a former district of Ninh Bình province in the Red River Delta region of Vietnam. Before 1010, Hoa Lư served as the capital of Đại Cồ Việt. Hoa Lư Ancient Capital is located in Trường Yên Commune (vi). It comprises 10 communes and one township: Trường Yên, Ninh Hòa, Ninh Giang, Ninh Mỹ, Ninh Khang, Ninh Xuân, Ninh Vân, Ninh Hải, Ninh An, Ninh Thắng and Thiên Tôn Township. As of 2003 the district had a population of 66,932. The district covers an area of 103 km². The district capital lies at Thiên Tôn.

The district was annexed by the city of Ninh Bình and formed Hoa Lư city on January 1, 2025.

== Gallery ==
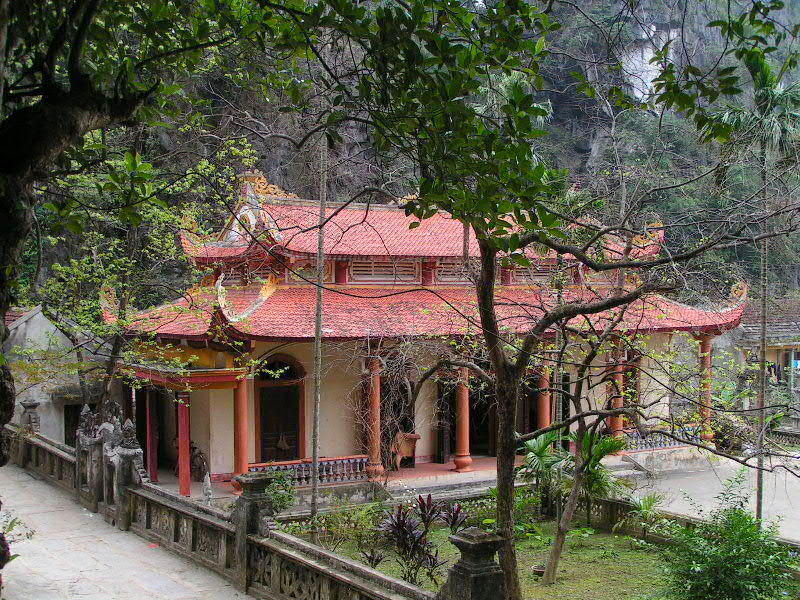
Tam Cốc-Bích Động

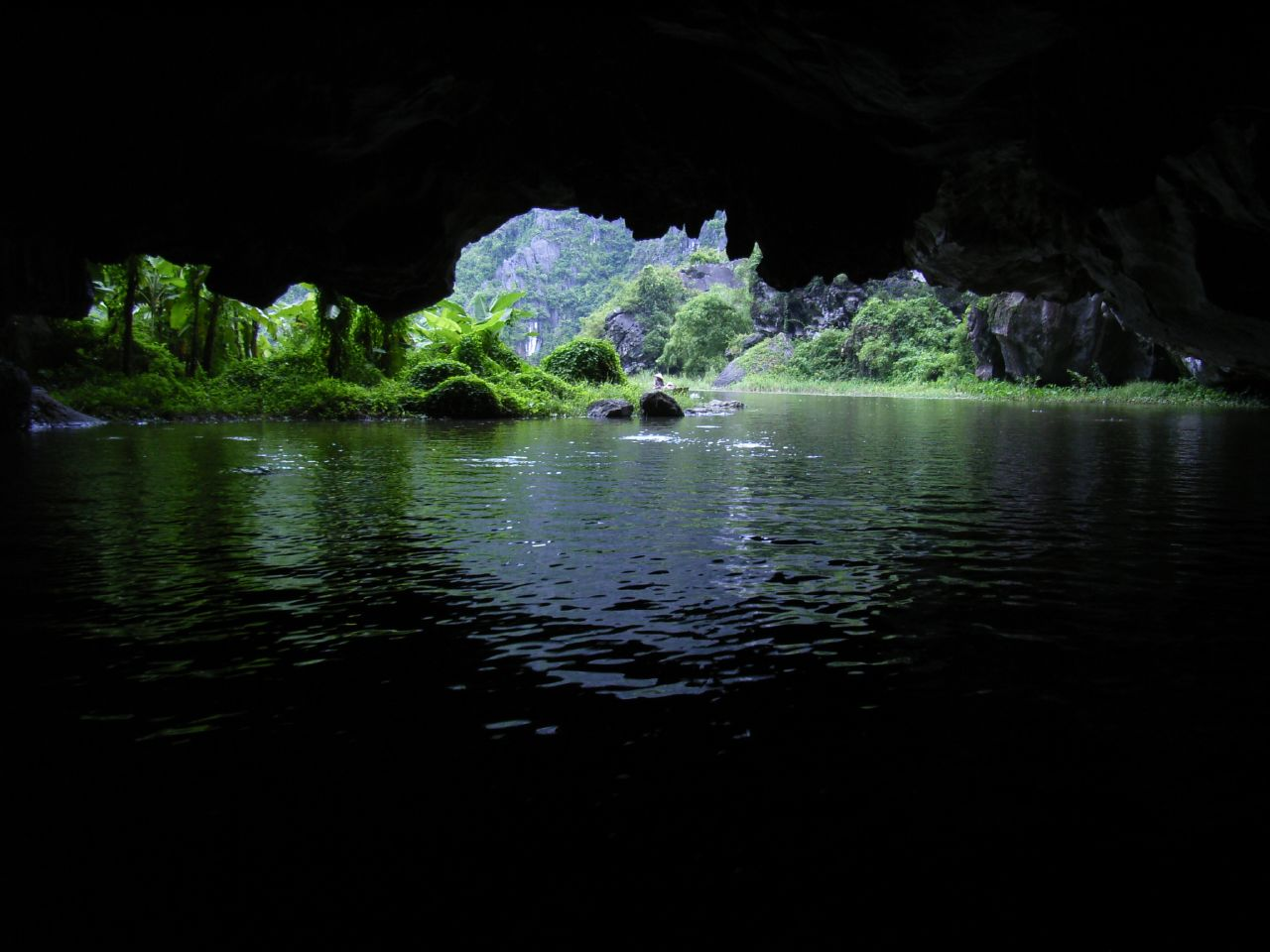
Tam Cốc-Bích Động

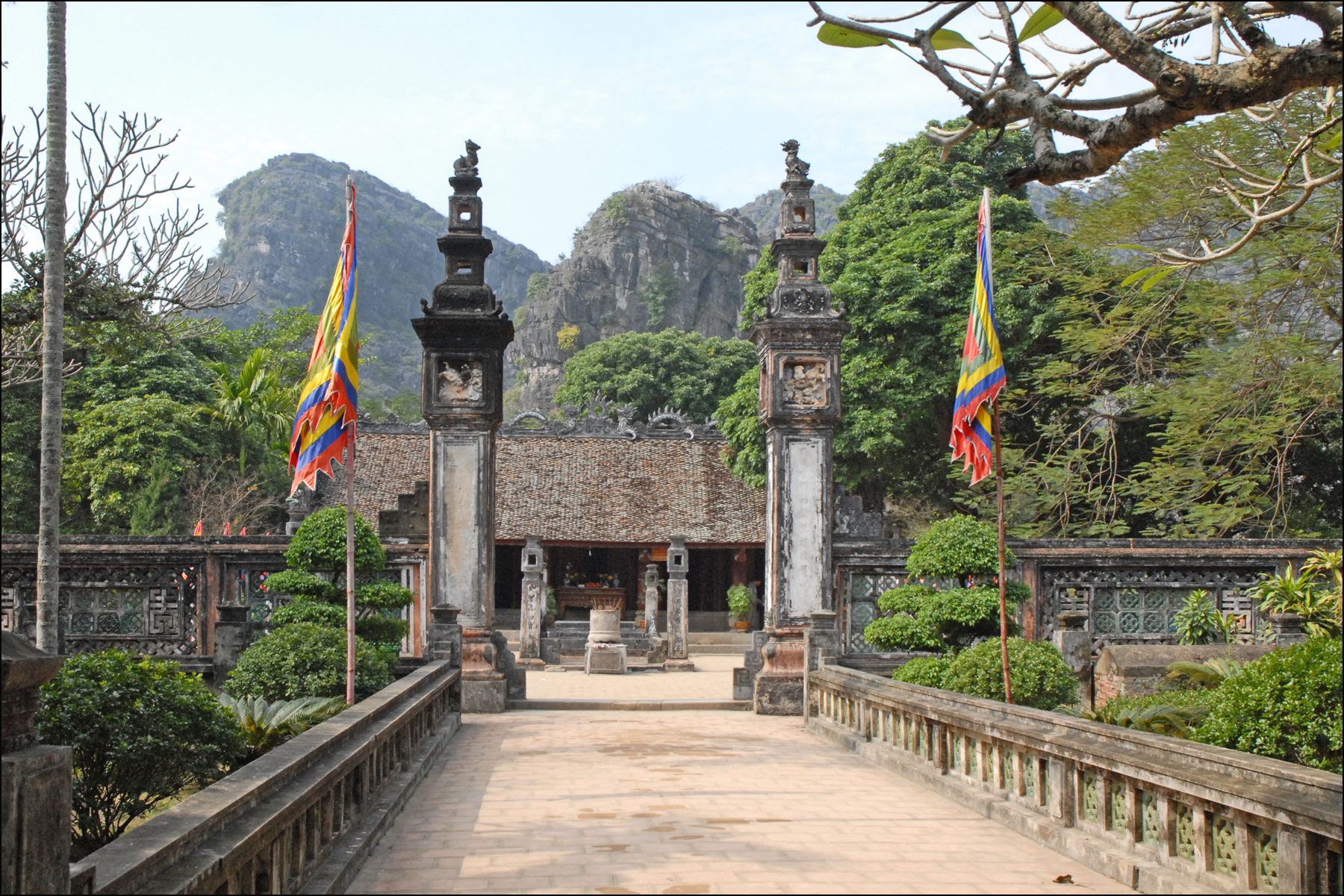
Hoa Lư Ancient Capital

== See also ==
- List of historical capitals of Vietnam
