= Non Nước Bridge =

Non Nước Bridge is a concrete bridge on Highway 10, Vietnam (vi), built in 1995 over the River Đáy between Hoa Lư city, capital of Ninh Bình Province, and Ý Yên District, Nam Định Province. There was also a railway bridge.

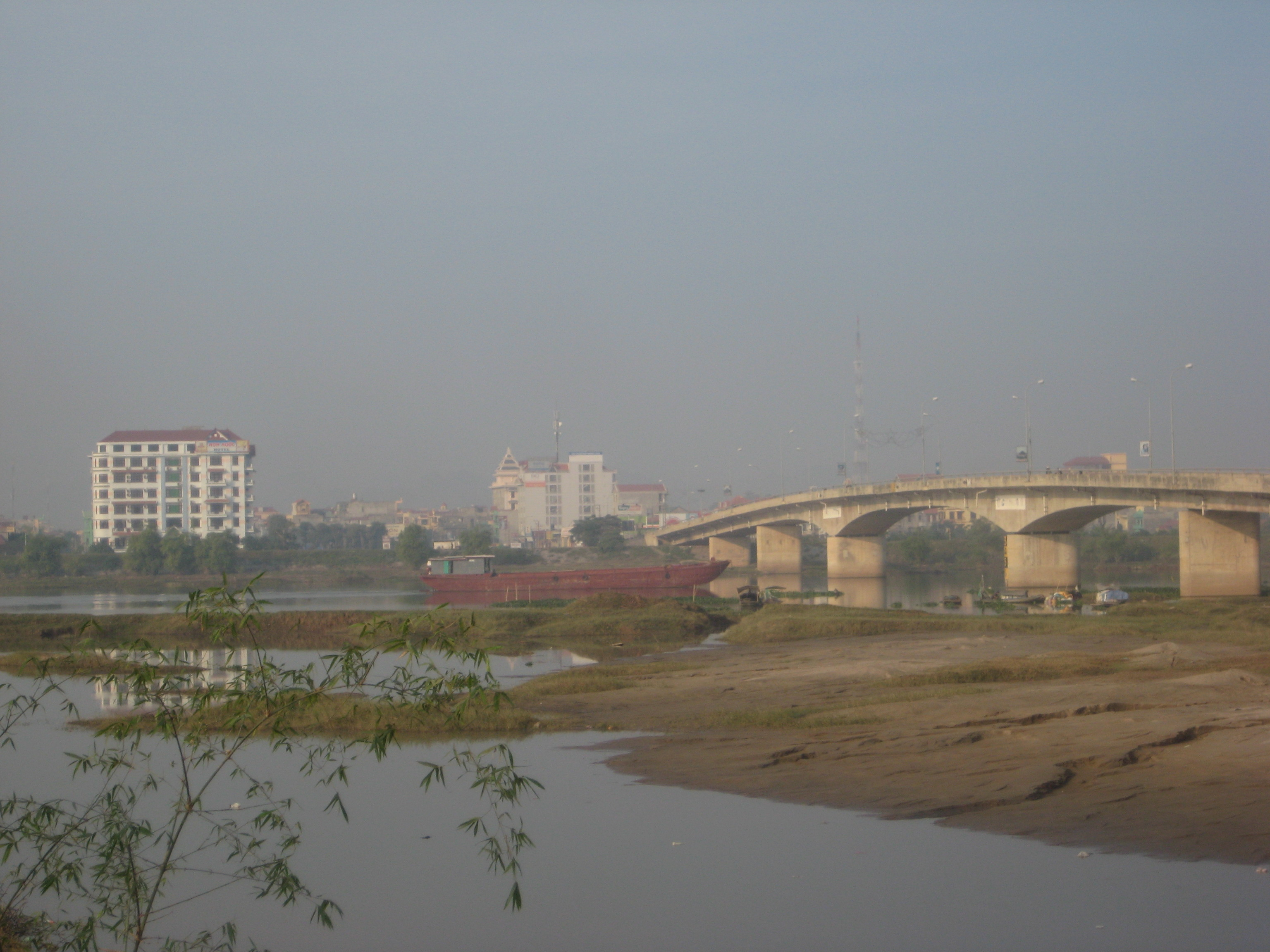
Caunonnuoc.jpg
