= Tam Cốc – Bích Động =

Popular tourist destination in north Vietnam

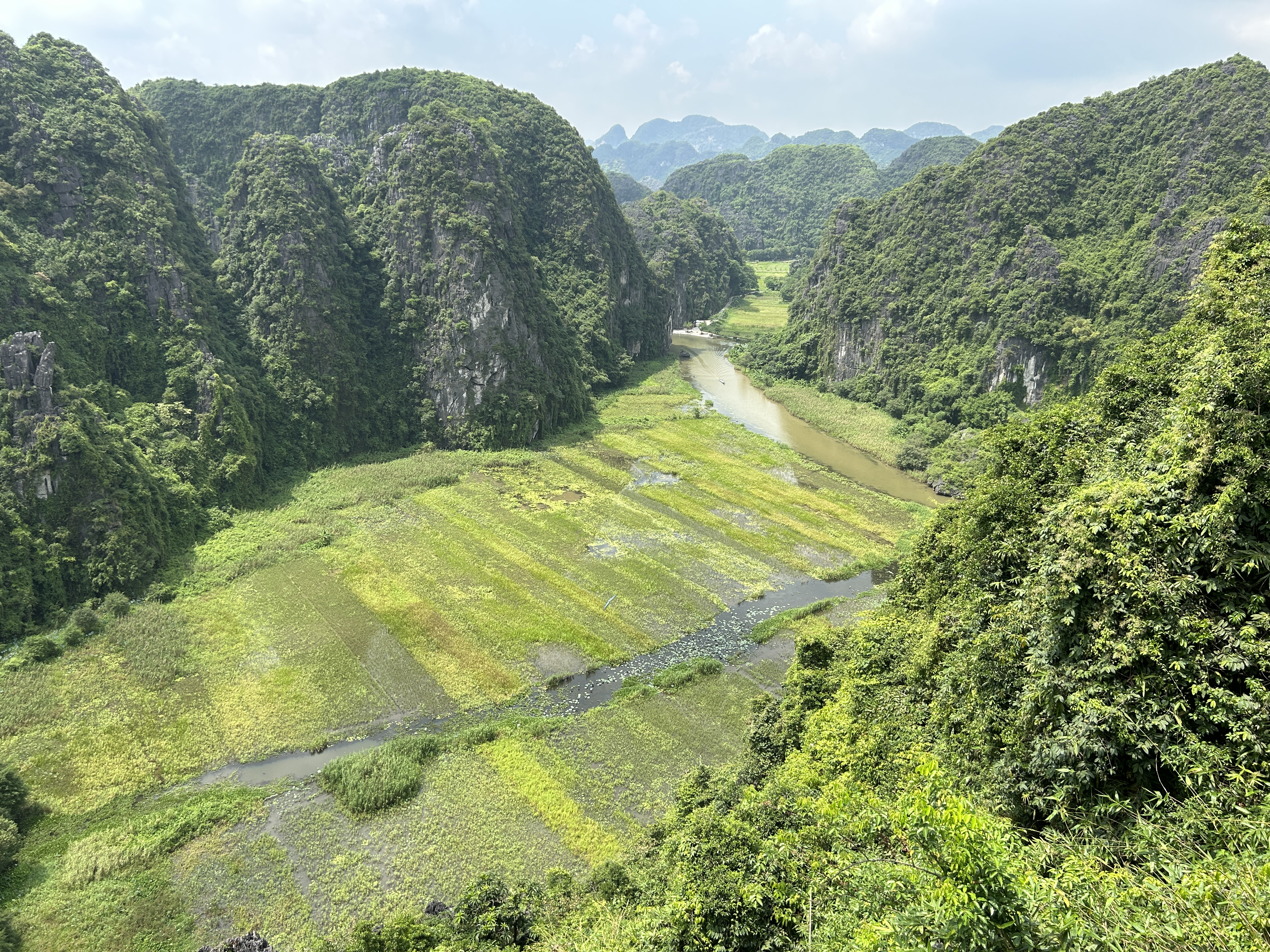
- Tam Cốc landscape viewed from the top of the mountain.
- Interactive map of Tam Cốc – Bích Động
- Location: Hoa Lư, Vietnam

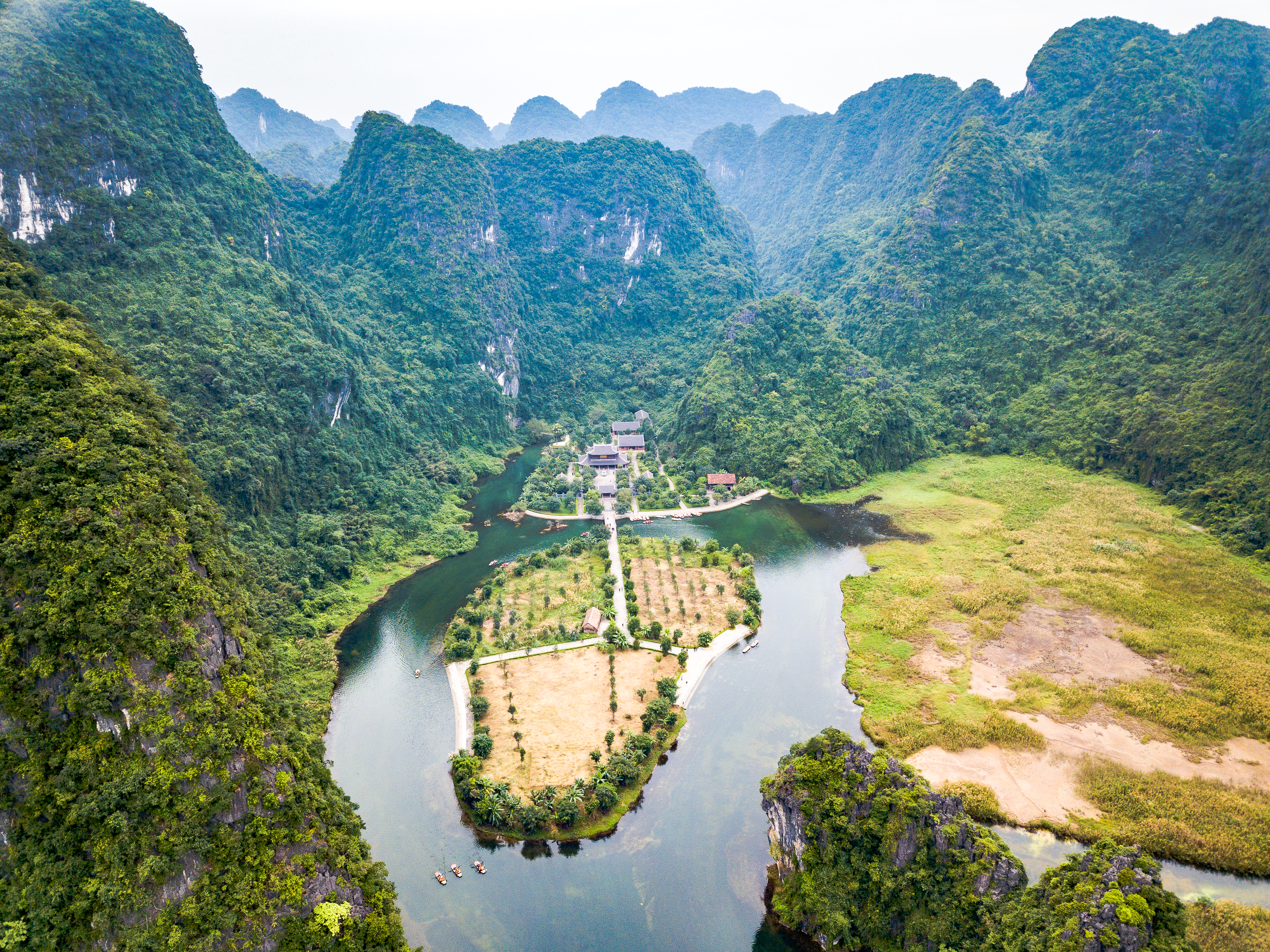
Panoramic view of part of Tam Cốc from above.

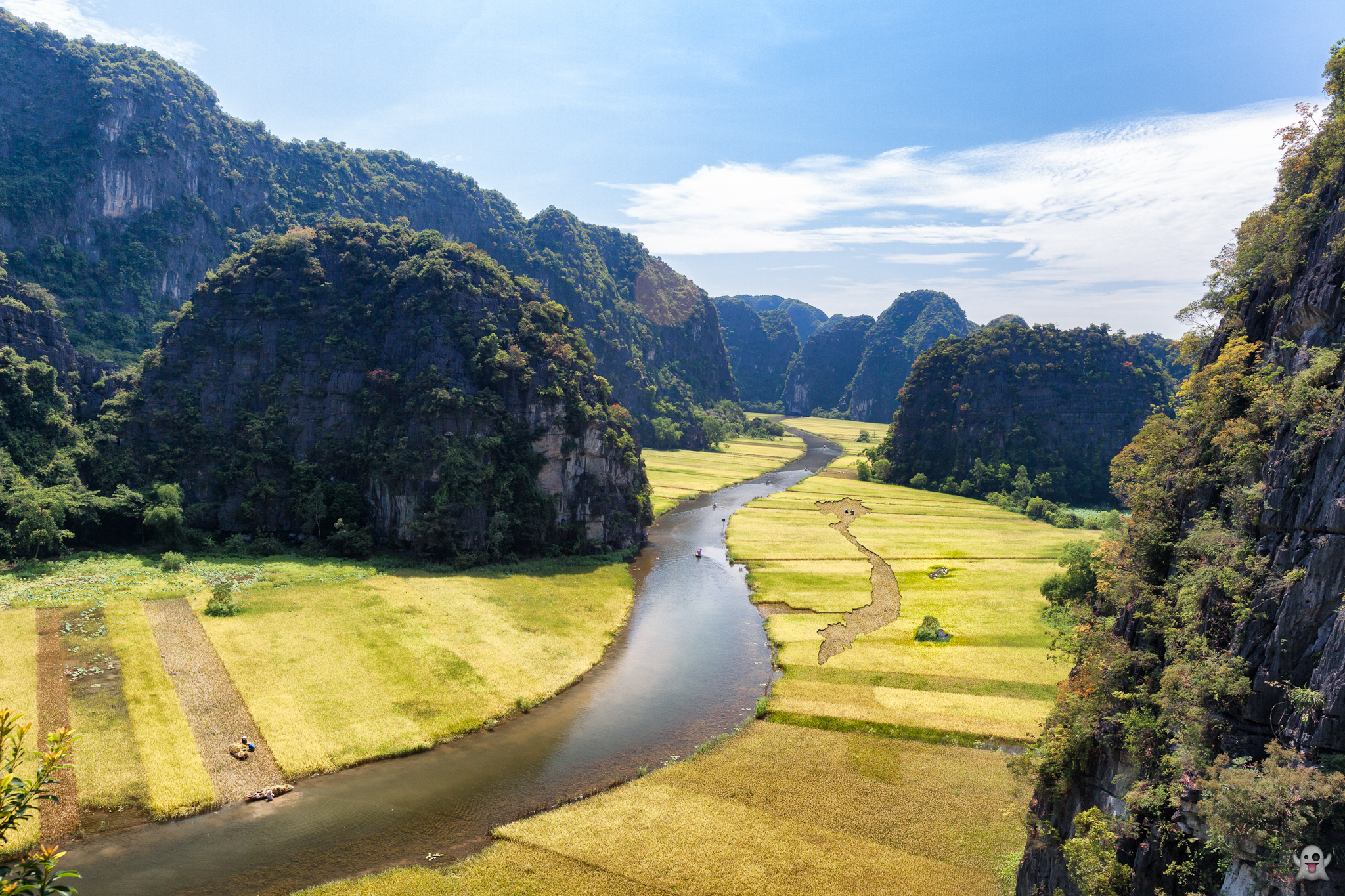
Tam Cốc in ripe rice season.

Tam Cốc – Bích Động is a popular tourist destination in north Vietnam and part of the Tràng An Scenic Landscape Complex UNESCO World Heritage site. It is located in Ninh Binh province, near the village of Tam Cốc. The closest city is Hoa Lư. It consists of two distinct attractions: Tam Cốc, a flooded cave karst system; and Bích Động, a series of mountain temples.

== Tam Cốc ==
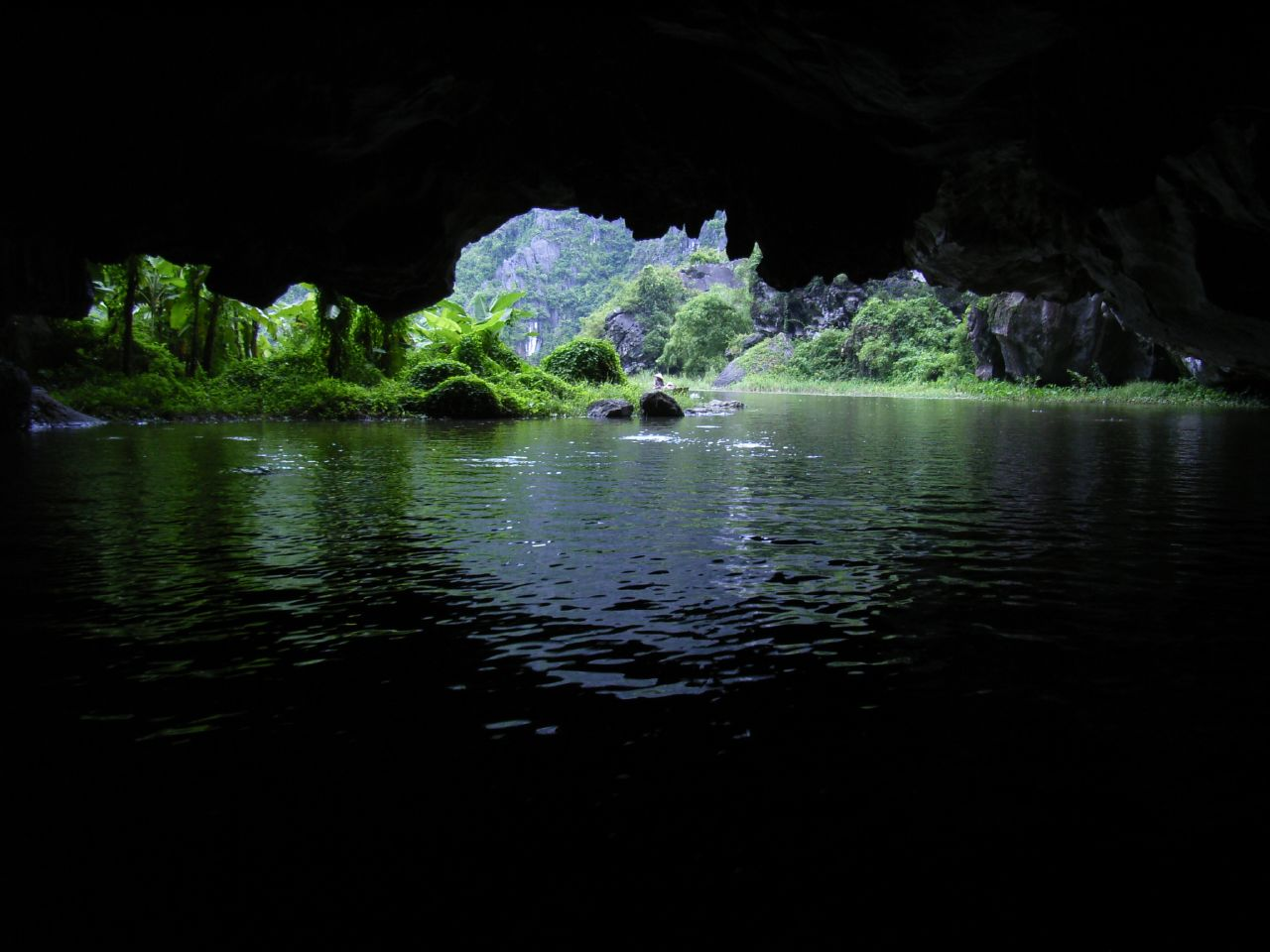
First cave

Tam Cốc, literally "three caves", consists of three natural caves — Hang Cả, Hang Hai, and Hang Ba — on the Ngô Đồng River. Tourists are taken in small boats along the river from the village of Ván Lám, through rice fields and limestone karsts, through the caves, and back. Local women serve as guides and attempt to sell embroidered goods to their passengers. The guides are well known for rowing their boats using their feet.

The area is nicknamed "the inland Ha Long Bay".

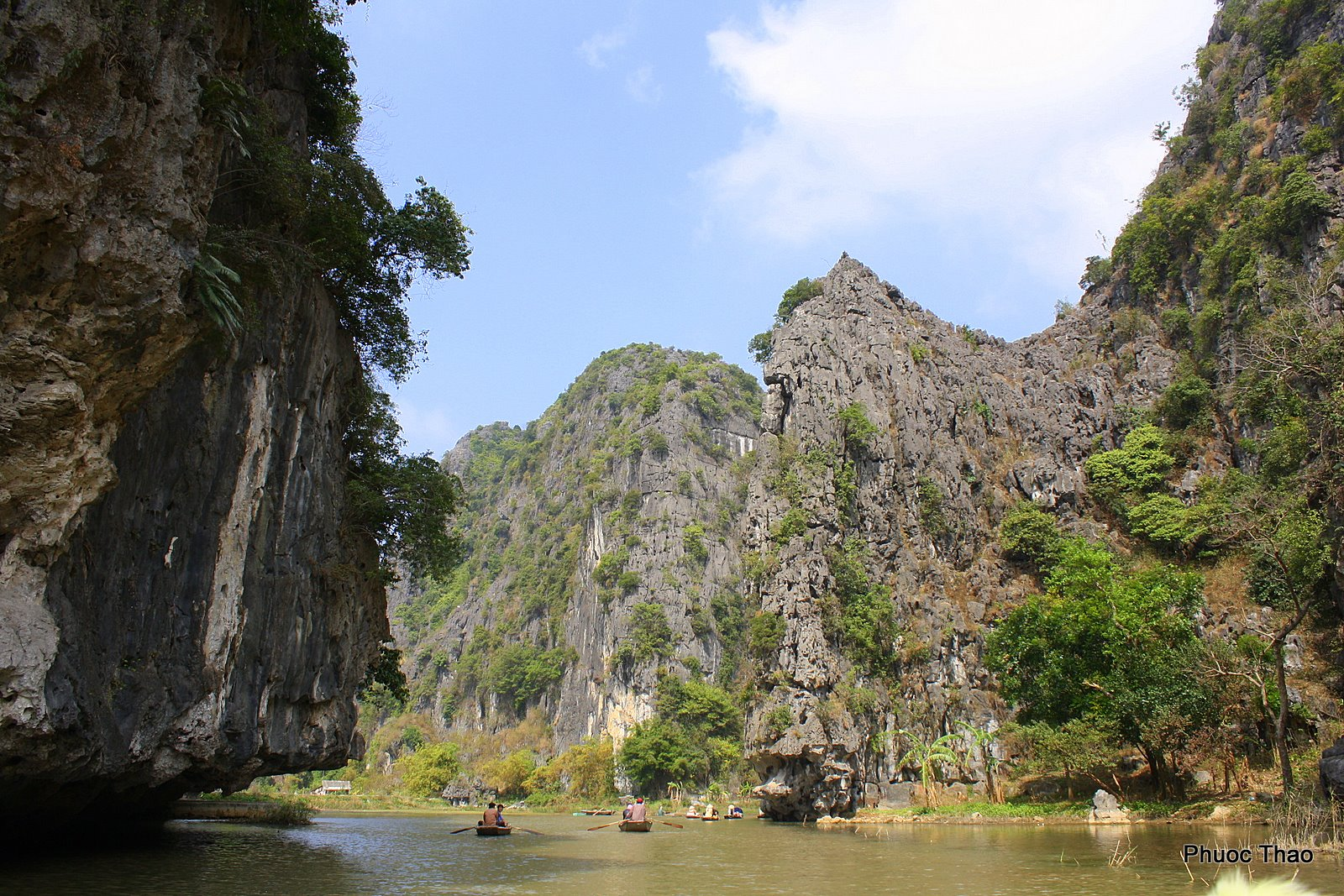
View of the Tam Cốc river and cave.

== Bích Động ==
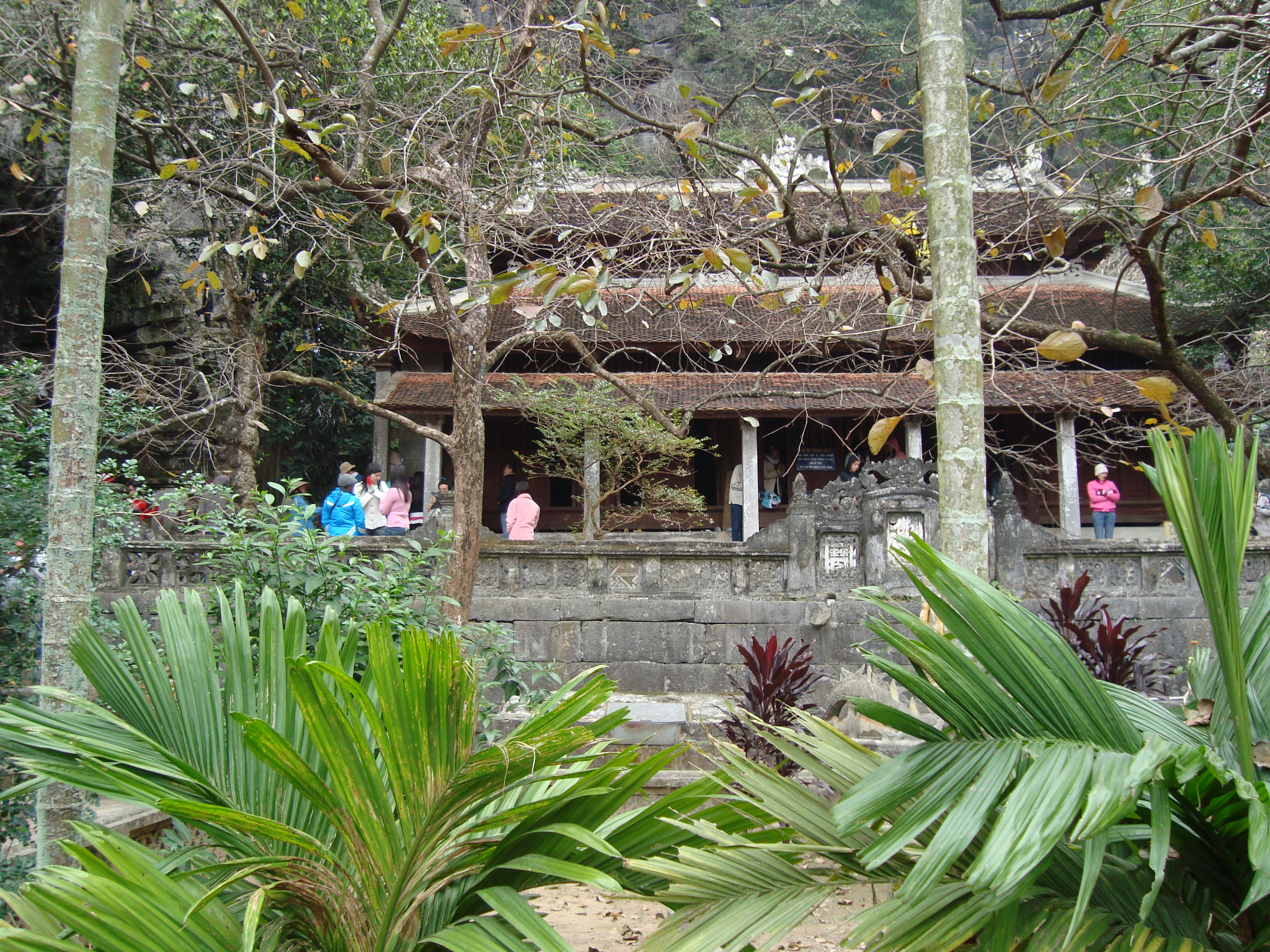
Hạ Temple

Bích Động is a temple complex, built in 1428. It is situated on nearby Ngũ Nhạc Mountain, and consists of three separate temples: Hạ, Trung, and Thượng Temples, in ascending order. Guided tours generally cover historical points and end with a view from the top.
