= Non Nước Pagoda (Hanoi) =

Buddhist temple in Hanoi, Vietnam

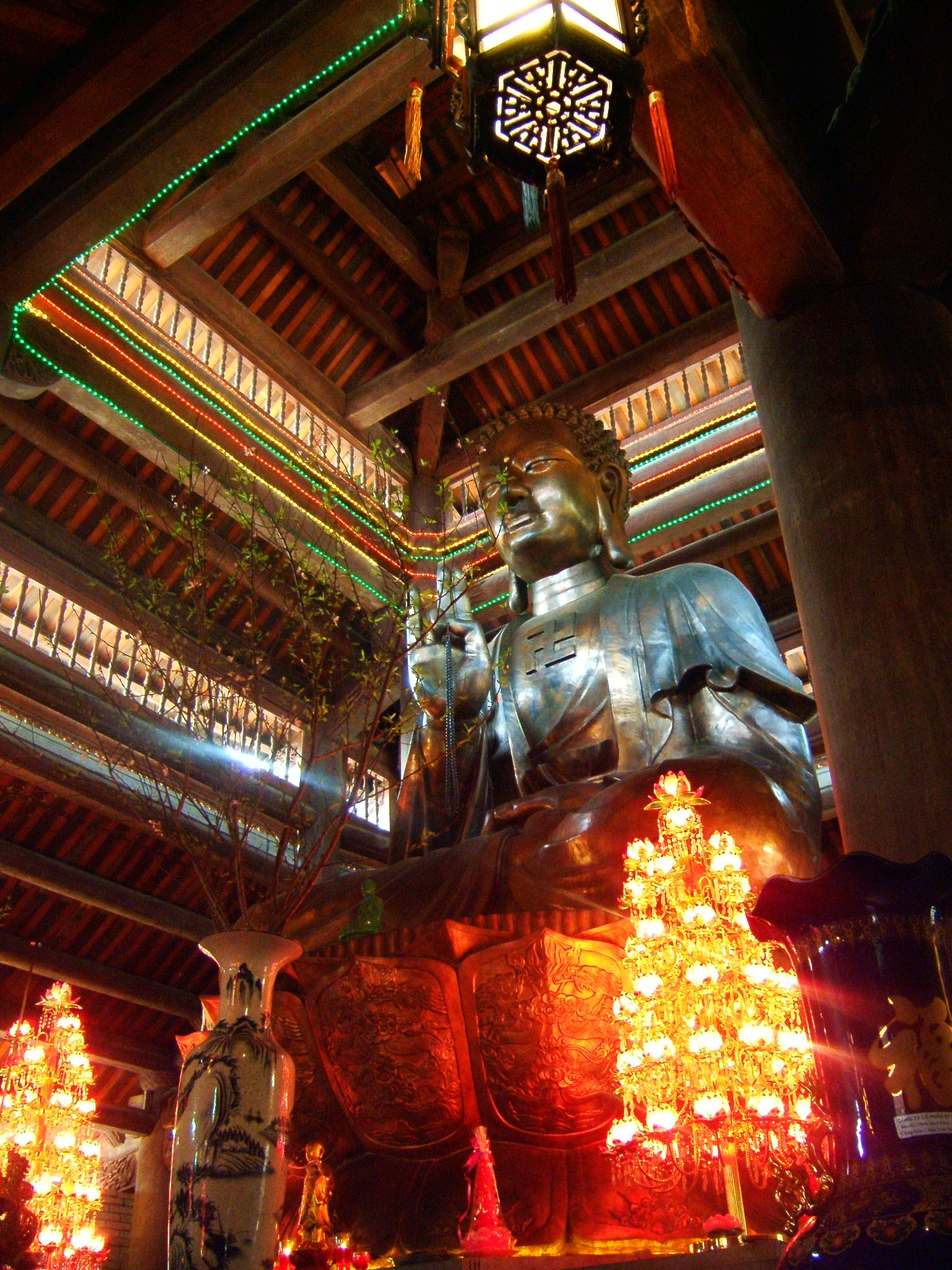
The bronze Buddha

Non Nước Pagoda, officially as ( Sóc Thiên Vương Thiền tự, 朔天王禪寺) is a Buddhist temple founded by Khuông Việt in 10th century in Sóc Sơn, Hanoi. The main attraction is a bronze Buddha.
