= Hoa Lư (city) =

City in Vietnam

- Provincial city (Class-1)
- Hoa Lư City; Thành phố Hoa Lư
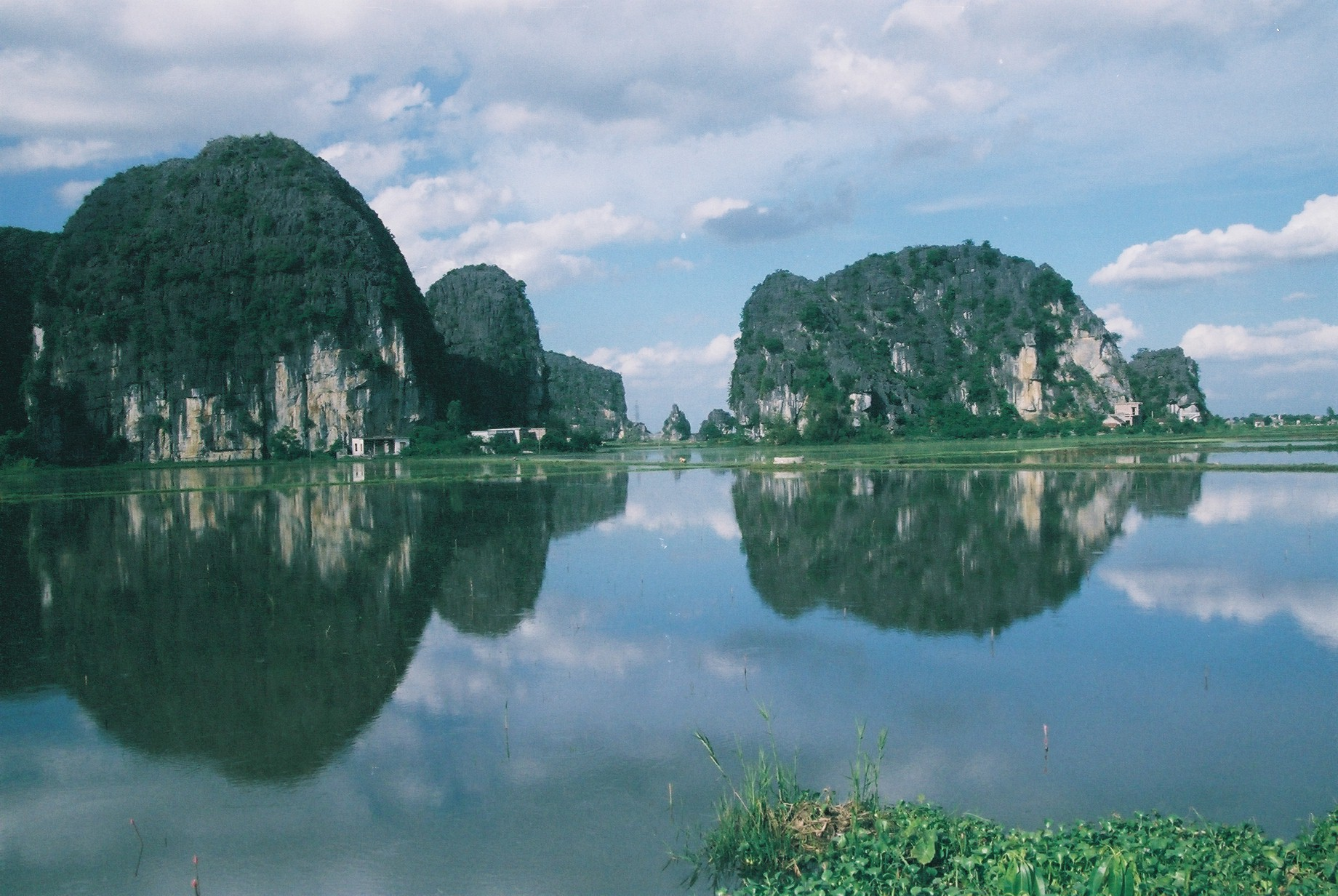

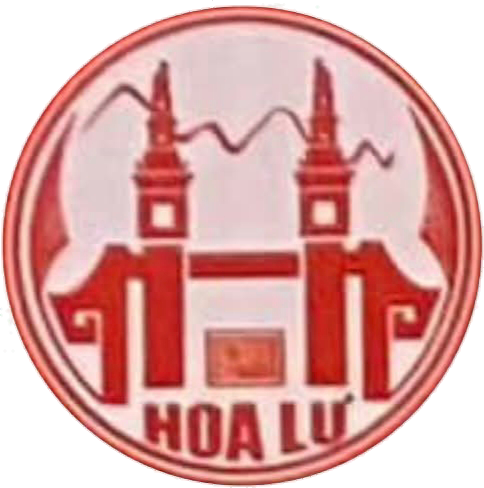
- Seal
- Interactive map of Hoa Lư
- Location of Hoa Lư in Vietnam
- Coordinates: 20°15′14″N 105°58′30″E
- Country: Vietnam
- Province: Ninh Binh

Area
  - Total: 150.24 km^{2} (58.01 sq mi)

Population (2023)
  - Total: 319,125
  - Density: 2,124.1/km^{2} (5,501/sq mi)
- Climate: Cwa

Hoa Lư is a former city in the Red River Delta of northern Vietnam. It was the capital of Ninh Bình Province.

Hoa Lư ceased to exist as a municipal city on 1 July 2025, following the elimination of district level units in Vietnam.

== Geography ==
Hoa Lư Ancient Capital is located in Trường Yên Commune (vi).

It takes 2 hours by coach to travel from Hanoi to Hoa Lư.

== History ==
The citadel of Ninh Bình (1884)

The name of Ninh Binh officially existed since 1822. During the Nguyen dynasty, in August 1884 in the Tonkin campaign, the allegiance of Ninh Bình was of considerable importance to the French, as artillery mounted in its lofty citadel controlled river traffic to the Gulf of Tonkin. Although the Vietnamese authorities in Ninh Bình made no attempt to hinder the passage of an expedition launched by Henri Rivière in March 1883 to capture Nam Định, they were known to be hostile towards the French. In November 1883, on the eve of the Sơn Tây campaign, the French occupied the citadel of Ninh Bình without resistance and installed a garrison.

On 1 January 2025, Ninh Bình city and Hoa Lư district merged to form Hoa Lư city.

== Climate ==
Hoa Lư experiences a humid subtropical climate (Köppen climate classification Cwa) with mild winters and hot, humid summers. The coldest month is January with a mean temperature of 16.6 °C (61.9 °F) and the warmest month is July with a mean temperature of 29.2 °C (84.6 °F).

Climate data for Hoa Lư
Month	Jan	Feb	Mar	Apr	May	Jun	Jul	Aug	Sep	Oct	Nov	Dec	Year
Record high °C (°F)	32.4 (90.3)	35.2 (95.4)	36.6 (97.9)	40.5 (104.9)	40.7 (105.3)	41.0 (105.8)	39.5 (103.1)	39.5 (103.1)	36.6 (97.9)	35.6 (96.1)	33.6 (92.5)	30.3 (86.5)	41.0 (105.8)
Mean daily maximum °C (°F)	19.6 (67.3)	20.2 (68.4)	22.6 (72.7)	27.0 (80.6)	31.1 (88.0)	32.9 (91.2)	32.8 (91.0)	31.9 (89.4)	30.6 (87.1)	28.4 (83.1)	25.3 (77.5)	21.7 (71.1)	27.0 (80.6)
Daily mean °C (°F)	16.6 (61.9)	17.5 (63.5)	19.9 (67.8)	23.7 (74.7)	27.3 (81.1)	29.0 (84.2)	29.2 (84.6)	28.5 (83.3)	27.3 (81.1)	25.0 (77.0)	21.8 (71.2)	18.3 (64.9)	23.7 (74.7)
Mean daily minimum °C (°F)	14.6 (58.3)	15.7 (60.3)	18.1 (64.6)	21.7 (71.1)	24.6 (76.3)	26.2 (79.2)	26.5 (79.7)	26.0 (78.8)	25.0 (77.0)	22.7 (72.9)	19.4 (66.9)	15.9 (60.6)	21.4 (70.5)
Record low °C (°F)	5.3 (41.5)	5.7 (42.3)	7.5 (45.5)	12.6 (54.7)	17.7 (63.9)	19.1 (66.4)	21.6 (70.9)	21.9 (71.4)	16.8 (62.2)	13.4 (56.1)	10.6 (51.1)	5.8 (42.4)	5.3 (41.5)
Average rainfall mm (inches)	27.9 (1.10)	26.4 (1.04)	46.3 (1.82)	74.4 (2.93)	169.3 (6.67)	210.5 (8.29)	236.3 (9.30)	314.9 (12.40)	362.4 (14.27)	219.1 (8.63)	67.3 (2.65)	28.6 (1.13)	1,783.5 (70.22)
Average rainy days	9.0	12.8	16.4	12.4	12.6	13.3	13.6	16.1	14.9	11.9	7.8	6.3	147.1
Average relative humidity (%)	84.4	87.5	89.4	88.8	84.9	82.4	82.0	85.5	85.2	82.5	80.9	80.7	84.5
Mean monthly sunshine hours	69.9	45.1	44.2	91.8	184.9	179.4	195.8	165.2	160.8	149.9	127.8	108.5	1,511.6
Source: Vietnam Institute for Building Science and Technology, Nchmf.gov.vn (August record high)
