= Xitu =

Xitu / Xītú Guó
- 5th century?–6th century?
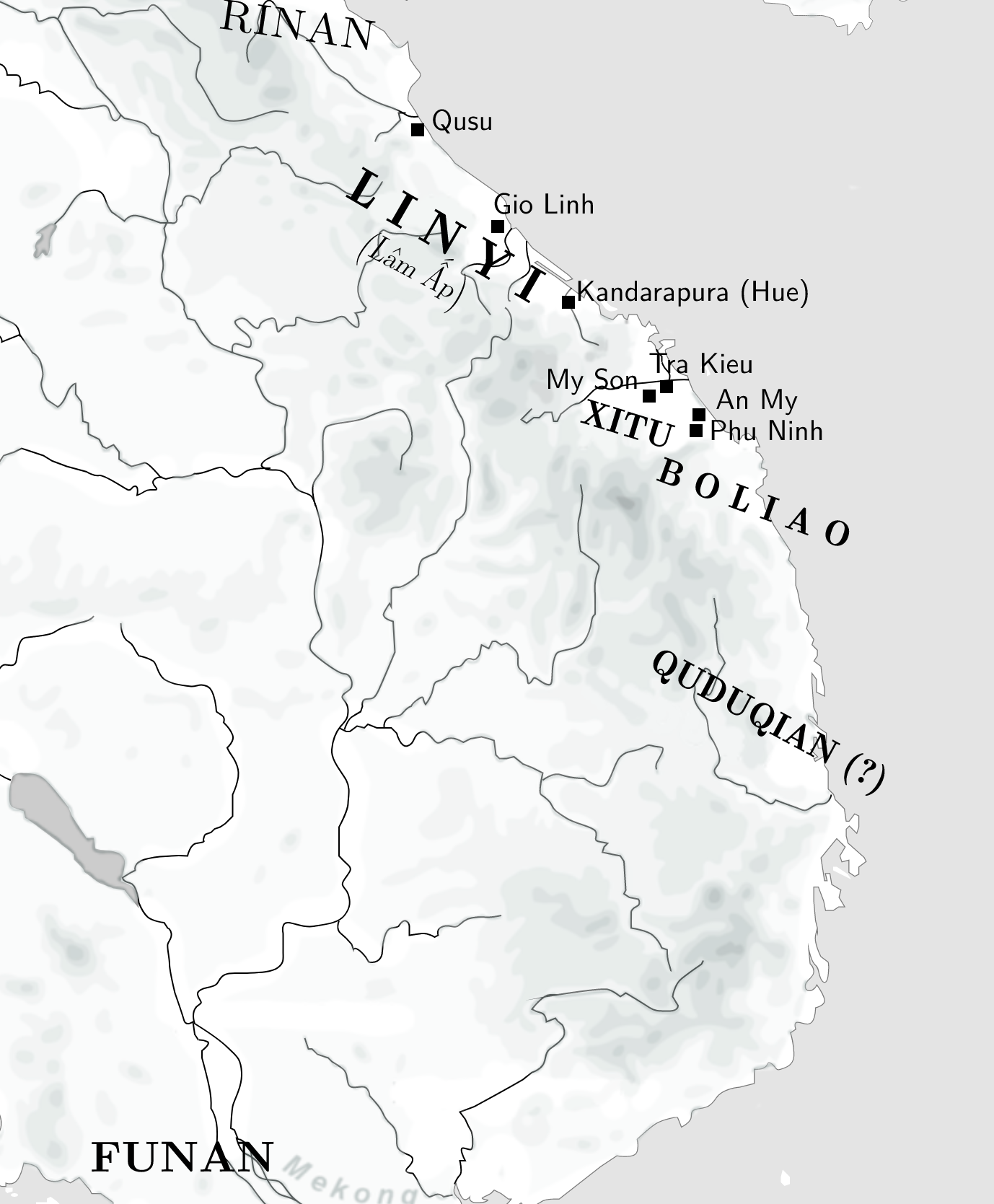
- Xitu in c. 450 AD
- Capital: Unknown; Trà Kiệu (disputed)
- Common languages: Old Cam, Chamic, Sanskrit, Katuic
- Government: Monarchy
- History
  - Established: 5th century?
  - Disestablished: 6th century?
Preceded by	Succeeded by
Sa Huỳnh culture; Han dynasty	Champa
- Today part of: Vietnam

Xitu (Vietnamese: Tây-đồ-quốc; Chinese: 西屠國; pinyin: Xītú Guó; lit. 'Kingdom of Xitu') was the Chinese designation for a historical region or a Chamic polity or kingdom that was first mentioned in the mid of fifth century AD, is believed to be one of the predecessors of Champa Kingdom. It has been proposed to be located in the Thu Bồn River Valley, present-day Quảng Nam Province, Central Vietnam.

== Background ==
The Thu Bồn River Valley was known for being one of many sanctuary zones of the Sa Huỳnh culture, a seafaring culture that was distributed across the Central Vietnam coast and had links across the South China Sea to the other side in the Philippines archipelago and even with Taiwan (through Maritime Jade Road, Sa Huynh-Kalanay Interaction Sphere), which now most archaeologists and scholars have consentient determined and no longer hesitant in linking with the ancestors of the Austronesian Cham and Chamic-speaking people.

Ancient Central Vietnam is said, during the regency of Duke of Zhou (1042–1035 BC), there was a tribe called Yuèshāng 越裳 (then Rinan) brought two black pheasants and one albino to the court of Zhou dynasty, presented as tributes. The Nanyue kingdom (204–111 BC) based from present-day Guangzhou, was founded by Zhao Tuo, a former Chinese general of Qin Shihuangdi. Nanyue projected its power into present-day northern Vietnam, which eventually then was becoming the southernmost part of Nanyue. The region was annexed by the Han emperor Wudi in 111 BC, who incorporated those territories corresponding to modern-day north and central Vietnam into the Han Empire. Central Vietnam from south of Ngang Pass in Hà Tĩnh then became known as Rinan (日南) province, meaning "south of the sun."

In 192 AD, a revolt in Rinan led by Khu Liên (區連 Qū Lián), son of a local official, killing the Han magistrate in Xianglin county (象林 Xiànglín in Chinese or Tượng Lâm in Vietnamese; modern-day Huế city). Khu Liên then established a kingdom known to the Chinese as Lâm Ấp or Linyi (Chinese: 林邑; Early Middle Chinese: *lim-ʔip). Lâm Ấp left no textual record. As reported by Chinese documents, there were several 'dozens' of small chiefdoms south of Lâm Ấp, such as Xitu, Boliao, and Quduqian. Quduqian sent an embassy to the Jin court in Luoyang in 286 AD.

By the fourth and fifth centuries AD, the first Sanskrit and Old Cam epigraphs (C. 72, C. 105, C. 147) emerged at the Thu Bồn River Valley and in Chiêm Sơn, Quảng Nam, south of Lâm Ấp. King Bhadravarman I (380–413) who left these inscriptions, was either identified as various figures in Chinese annals. Mỹ Sơn and nearby Trà Kiệu could have been the center of Cham and precedent Sa Huỳnh culture, whence their settlements initially had already begun in the 1st-2nd century, with gradually Indian Hinduism and Buddhism diffusion might have reached there via neighboring Funan kingdom in the Mekong Delta and the maritime networks.

Georges Maspero identified Bhadravarman with Fan Huda (Chinese: 范胡達; pinyin: Fàn Húdá; EMC: *buam’-ɣɔ-dɑt) in the Book of Jin. George Coedès speculates that Bhadravarman could be Fàn Fó. Most recently, British palaeographist William Southworth and French scholar Anne-Valérie Schweyer conjecture the profile of Bhadravarman with a man named Fan Dānggēnchún (范當根純)/Jiū Chóuluó (鳩酬羅), a Funanese refugee who then usurped the throne of Lâm Ấp, recorded in the History of the Southern Dynasties. Fan Dānggēnchún was a king of Xitu and conquered Linyi with support of rebels. He was bestowed by the Chinese Qi dynasty titles Chijie 持節 (Commissioner with Special Powers), Dudu Yanhai Zhujunshi 都督沿海諸軍事 (Commander-in-Chief of all Military Affairs in the Coastal Region), Annan Jiangjun 安南將軍 (General of Pacification of the South), and Linyi Wang 林邑王 (King of Linyi).

Chinese sources provided very faint descriptions of Linyi and did not give an explanation why the border of Linyi got expanded southward in the 6th century. 18th-century Vietnamese geographer Le Quy Don thought that Xitu was merged into Linyi. Modern historians, such as Rolf Stein, Southworth (2001), and Schweyer (2010), believe vice versa that early Xitu (Thu Bồn River Valley) might be the actual Champa, while Linyi could have been subsumed by Xitu (Champa) in the late fifth to sixth centuries. Andrew Hardy, a historian of Vietnam, suggests that the Linyi of what Chinese scribers had described was likely not a Chamic state and later, similar to what Southworth and Schweyer believing, it was absorbed by Champa/Chamic kingdom as Champa's power expanded north.

== Xitu in Chinese sources ==
The Chinese trade treatise Account of foreign countries to the south of Jiaozhou cited in the Imperial encyclopedia Taiping yulan gives a description of Xitu: "There are ten small kingdoms nearby, all of which are dependencies of Xitu. About two thousand barbarian families subsist here." Another stereotyped passage in the Shui Jing Zhu describes Xitu as one of 10 states surrounding Linyi, and Xitu also had its own ten vassal states and chiefdoms in adjacency.

Southworth (2001) and Schweyer (2010) link Bhadravarman of what-to-be Campa with Fan Danggenchun (Chinese: 范當根純; pinyin: Fàn Dānggēnchún; MC: *buam’-tɑŋ-kən-dʑwin)/Jiu Chouluo (Chinese: 鳩酬羅; pinyin: Jiū Chóuluó; MC: *kuw-ʥuw-la; r. ?–492), supposedly ruler of Xitu. He was a Funanese émigré. With the help of rebels in Lâm Ấp/Linyi, Fan Danggenchun conquered the country and assassinated the current king of Linyi, apparently that king might be Manorathavarman (Chinese: 范文敌, pinyin: Fàn Wéndí) and his lineage (Gangaraja dynasty), who originated from Huế. Schewyer hypothesizes that the Gangaraja dynasty of early Champa originally could have come from Linyi but then migrated south to Xitu (Quang Nam). In 484, the king of Funan Jayavarman sent a request to the Qi court to launch a punitive expedition against Linyi, whose throne reportedly had been usurped by a slave who had fled from Funan (probably Fang Danggenchun/Jiu Chouluo), however the Chinese just politely declined.

In 530, king Rudravarman I (r. 527–572 AD; Chinese: 律陁羅跋摩; pinyin: Lütuóluóbámó; MC: *lɔ-dɑ-lɑ-bɑt-mɑ), a son of the daughter of the sister of king Manorathavarman, was recognized by the Chinese as the king of Linyi. He might have tried to reconquer the lost territories of Linyi from his base in Xitu, even though he was originally from Linyi, according to Schewyer. In 541 he invaded the Jiude/Cửu Đức (Chinese: 九徳; pinyin: Jiǔdé; today Hà Tĩnh) province. Xitu historians assume this event to be the incorporation of Linyi into Xitu (the proper Campa). According to the Campa epigraphic inventory of the École française d'Extrême-Orient, inscription C. 73A at My Son (c. 600s AD) concerning Rudravarman's son Sambhuvarman (r. 572–629) and grandson Kandarpadharma (r. 629–640) is the first to omit several designations collectively referring entirely to the Chamic realm: Campādeśa (the country of the Cham), Campāpura (the cities/state of the Cham), campā (Champa), campāpr̥thivībhuj (lord of the land of Champa).

The city of Kandarpapura near Huế City might have only been established during the reign of Kandarpadharma, when he supposedly had already subjugated the remnant of Linyi, so it assuredly was not the name of the capital of former Linyi. Territorial extent of early Champa is not precisely attested because of prerequisite fluctuation.

When the Chinese Sui dynasty launched an invasion of Linyi in 605 AD led by general Liu Fang and pillaged the capital, which Southworth presumes as Trà Kiệu (Simhapura), the Chinese seized numerous war trophies including royal archives and a library of 1,350 Buddhist books written in Kunlun language, perhaps Chamic/proto-Cham/Austronesian. Michael Vickery anticipates that "Kunlun (kuruṅ) was almost certainly Mon-Khmer rather than Austronesian." He predicts that the old remnant of Linyi when being chased by Rudravarman, consisted of predominantly Mon-Khmer (Katuic or Vietic) chiefs, might have moved north and defected to Ly Bon, maintaining themselves as a high status group.

== Location ==
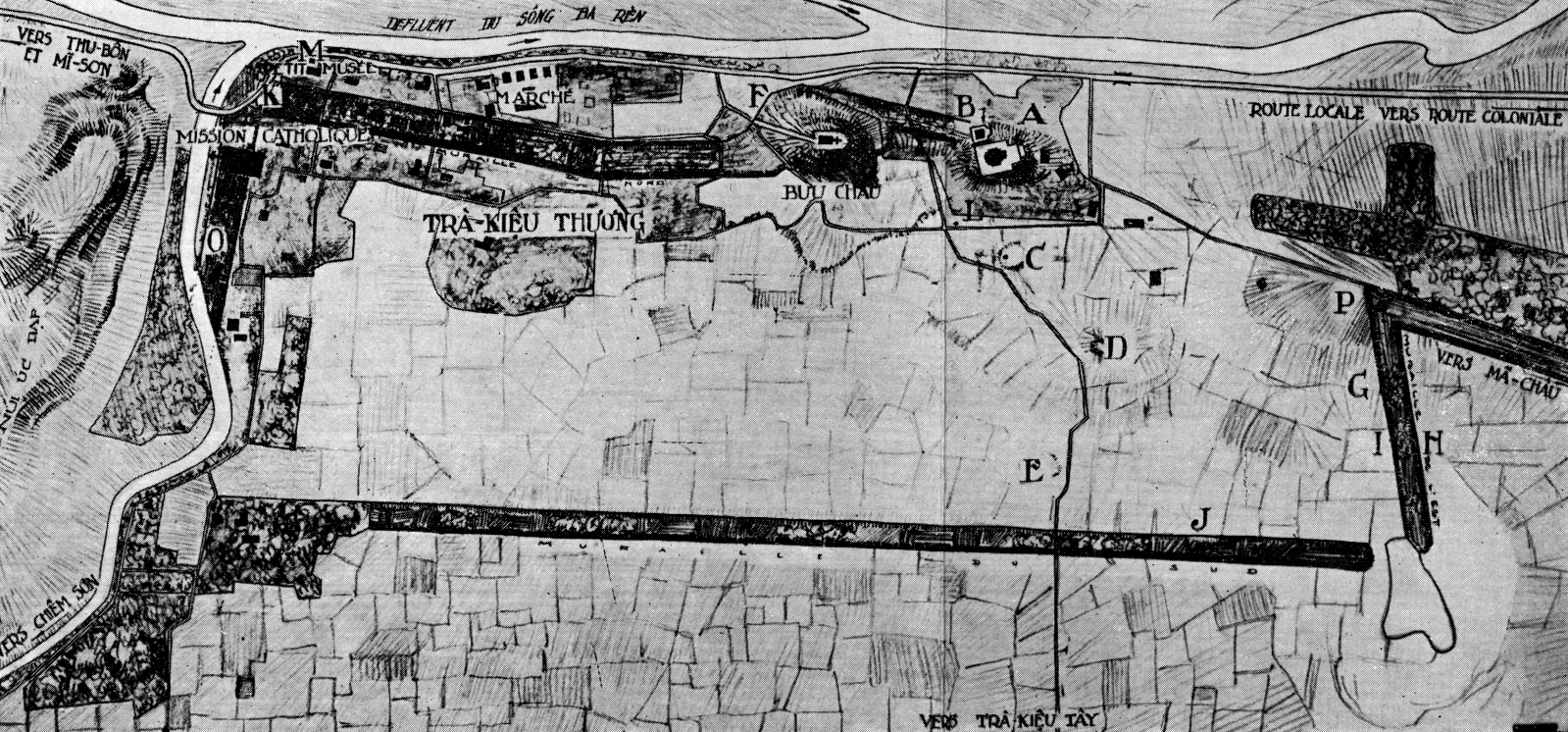
Sketch of Tra Kieu citadel from above, 1928.

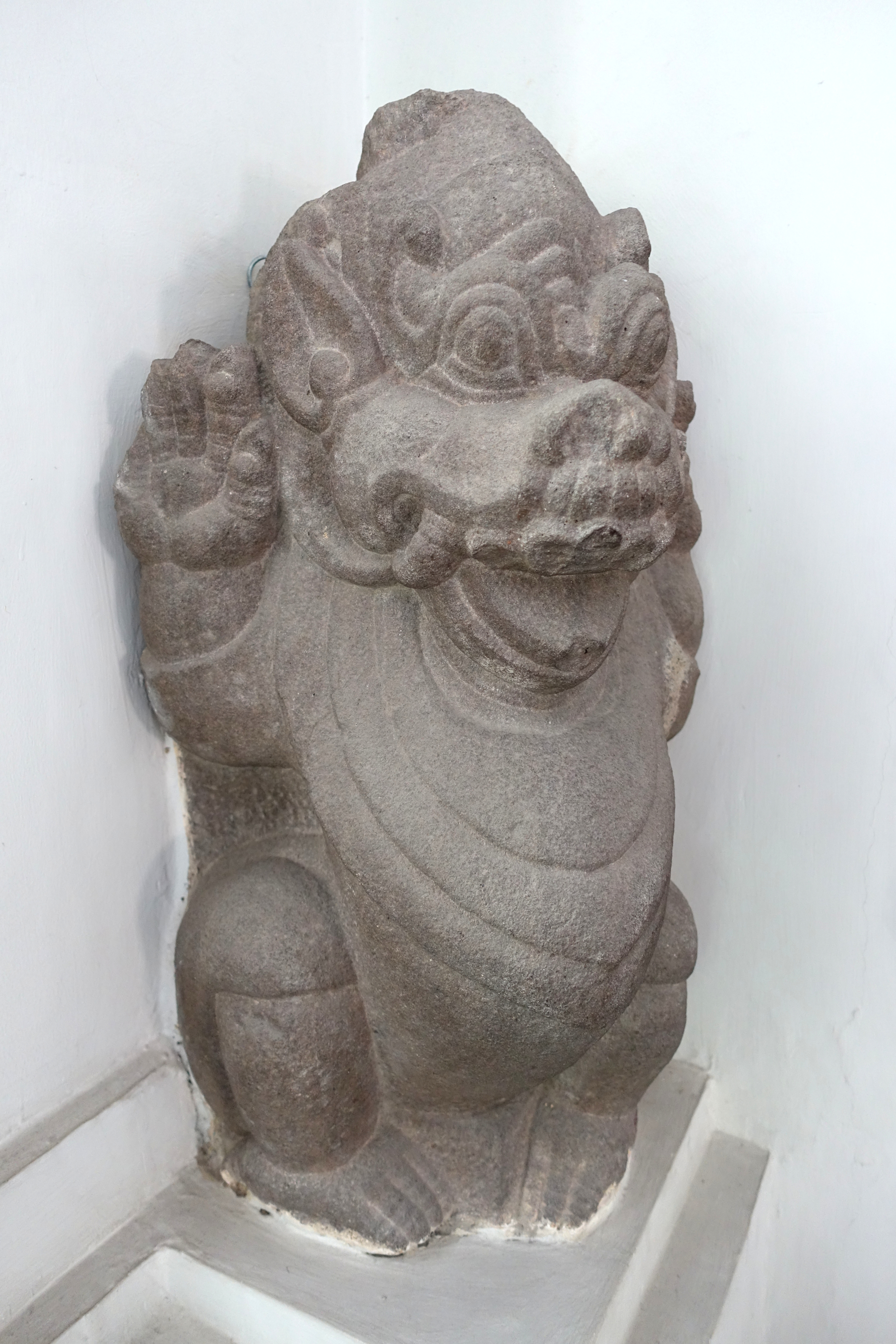
Lion sculpture from Tra Kieu, former Simhapura, c. 7th-8th century AD

Xitu is said to be 200 li (100–120 km = 62–74 miles) south of Linyi, south of the Hải Vân Pass, roughly situated in present-day Thu Bồn River Valley. Its center should have been Trà Kiệu (Simhapura) in Duy Xuyên District, Quảng Nam Province. Archaeologists maintain the mainstream thesis that Trà Kiệu is a Linyi/Lam Ap site, whilst Xitu-theory historians contend "it should be freely admitted that the Thu Bồn valley had no direct connection with Linyi." Central Vietnam, where early multi-ethnic societies and later Champa formed, is notoriously difficult to sustain local civilization and state crafting. Its long coastal area lies directly along the safe maritime route connecting China and the Southern states. The Annamite mountains with many steep slopes cut through the coast, creating many small, narrow plains and short rivers. Boundaries between those plains are extreme terrains, commonly limestone mountains covered with thick jungles. Societies there had to withstand natural hazards, such as drought, flood, and tropical cyclones. Subsistence agriculture alone could not sustain state development, and so communities had to trade with each other via maritime networks, with other places, and sometimes, became competing trade rivals. Since Chamic peoples and Austronesians in general, have been famously known for being masters of the ocean, trade activities connecting given mainland, the Philippines and the Indonesian archipelagos, had been there long before the Chinese.

The Thu Bồn River Valley is a particularly large and flat plain among them. It lies along the South China Sea and receives the ever largest amount of precipitation in Indochina, especially during the rainy season. The valley should be able to stimulate the development of a strong trade-oriented estuarine economic power during the late Sa Huỳnh era. In fact, the most valuable commodities in early Imperial China–ivory, rhinoceros horn, tortoise-shell, sandalwood and eaglewood–were sold in large quantity from Central Vietnam, far surpassing that of any other region in Southeast Asia, with the single exception of the Red River Delta. The foundation of Linyi in 192 AD, according to Southworth (2011), "was almost certainly a loose alliance of river-based chiefdoms aimed at maximizing profits from trade with the Chinese while vigorously opposing any direct imposition of Chinese state control."

Still, the relationship between Linyi and Sahuynhian Tra Kieu is unclear. Tra Kieu and nearby Go Cam were excavated in 1999-2003 (with assistance from the British Academy, the Toyota Foundation, the National Geographic Society, Harvard-Yenching Institute, and the research funds of the Institute of Archaeology, National Center for Social Sciences and Humanities in Hanoi) are surprisingly rich in the amount of Chinese culture or trade dominance ranging from the first century BC to the third century AD, with almost artifacts having Chinese style motifs and Chinese inscriptions, including Wang Mang era (9-23 AD) coins. Most Western Han bronze mirrors frequently dating from the first century BC to the first century AD are found in the west of the Hoi An area. Dong Son Heger type I drums dating back to c. 100 BC are being found scattered around Sa Huynh, near the terminus of Sa Huynh zone, and pre-Funan Go O Chua sites (near the Dong Thap Muoi swamp in the Mekong Delta), reflects pre-state trade and connection between these early communities. Early centuries AD Indian wares and Kendis-bronze kettle, are also presented in Tra Kieu and Go Cam.

By the third century, inland Trà Kiệu may have replaced Hoi An to become the main center of political power in the Thu Bồn River Valley. Communities here seemed to be absorbing Indian culture, not by happenstance, but through slowly diffusion via neighboring Funan and maritime networks utilized by Chamic seafarers. By the fifth century, it is irrefutable that the Chamic elites were accustomed to Indian religions and Indian culture. Four out of five fifth-century Sanskrit and South Brahmic epigraphs of Bhadravarman I were discovered in Quảng Nam, with one exception in Chợ Dinh, Đà Rằng River in Phú Yên province, some five hundred kilometers to the south. This inscription attests a sacrifice to the god Bhadreśvara proselytized at My Son. One of them renders Old Cham language, the first native language of Southeast Asia being written down. Bhadravarman confessed himself dharmmamahārāja, "Great King of the dharma."

Architecture and art style for this period are indeed Cham, but also a significant amount of Chinese influence as well. Cham kings constructed citadels and palaces by combining Chinese and Indian styles with their indigenous components, with Indian influences, which can be observed clearest on multifaceted roof tiles, motifs, and decorations. Hinduism might have reached through diffusion from Funan and left an impact to a larger extent than Buddhism in Trà Kiệu, compared to the Lung Khe citadel site in Northern Vietnam. Traces of Indian influence and Funanese art styles also found their way to the north, indicating a certain existence of South-North cross-cultural exchange and trade networks in 5th-6th century Vietnam. Based on the remaining materials compared to other corpora of inscriptions, Zakharov (2019) mitigates the scale of early Champa to a small princely state. However, he considers that polity was not necessarily called Champa.

== Xitu and Linyi theory ==
The classical narrative of Champa of Maspero, some derived from works of early French scholars Étienne Aymonier and Abel Bergaigne, presents a reductive version of a unified Champa Kingdom, now is widely received heavy criticism, because it intentionally misses many critical key points and lacks a fixed explanation for the preexistence of other nearby mentioned polities. By comprehensive nature, Champa was not always a unified polity ruled by a single monarch. Instead, according to new revisionist academics in the 80s such as Po Dharma & Trần Quốc Vượng, there were many different Champas in history, and this has been contesting to be true. Since that point, historians have tried to move away from the established historiographical framework which had been set up by early scholarship. French scholar Rolf Stein published a reexamination in 1947 to counter Maspero's argumentation by speculating that Linyi and Xitu must have been different kingdoms, so identification between their kings with Chinese records is null. Instead of treating Campa synonymous with the Linyi in Chinese records, Southworth (2001) in his 2001 thesis, tentatively suggests that early Champa history might have deviated into two rivaling polities and that were Linyi and Xitu (which Xitu was the actual Champa and spoke Chamic). His primary hypothetical scenario is when Xitu swallowed its northern neighbor Linyi, Chinese annalists, from their perspectives may be getting confused about the distinction between Linyi and Xitu, and then implied the name Linyi to Xitu as well, thereafter the narrative of the Xitu-Linyi dichotomy was combined. Historian Michael Vickery expresses his supportive view of the Linyi-Xitu theory in his 2005 assessment: "Along with this process the Cham, whose first center may well have been at Trà Kiệu (erstwhile Xitu), also expanded northward into what had been old Linyi territory and the Chinese — unaware of, or unconcerned with, the ethnolinguistic complexities — continued to call the region Linyi until the mid-eighth century."

Archaeologists' consensus however disputes with historians' reinterpretation of Chinese sources and Campa inscriptions. For instance, Yamagata (2011) & (2007) believes that Linyi was early Champa, and Trà Kiệu symbolizes the state development of a unified Cham polity. But Champa was also not always an absolute loosely-connected network of independent polities. Momorki Shiro admits the fact should be noted that there were periods in Champa history when the whole realm was ruled by only one single monarch and great degree of unity, indicated by those inscriptions that being erected by a single ruler in a given period and corresponding Chinese chronicles and reports, thus put some challenges to the multi-Campa theory. The history of Champa is fundamentally much more complicated rather than maximally simplifying. There were many early states had been erased from history that are very difficult to keep tracking. The unified Champa theory is incorrect, and the loosely connected federation of Cham localities theory is also partially at odds and incomplete.

== See also ==
- History of Champa
- Funan
- Other early states in Central Vietnam
  - Lâm Ấp
  - Quduqian
  - Hồ Tôn Tinh
