= Lâm Ấp =

Ancient kingdom in Central Vietnam (192–629)

Kingdom of Lâm Ấp 林邑國
- 192–629
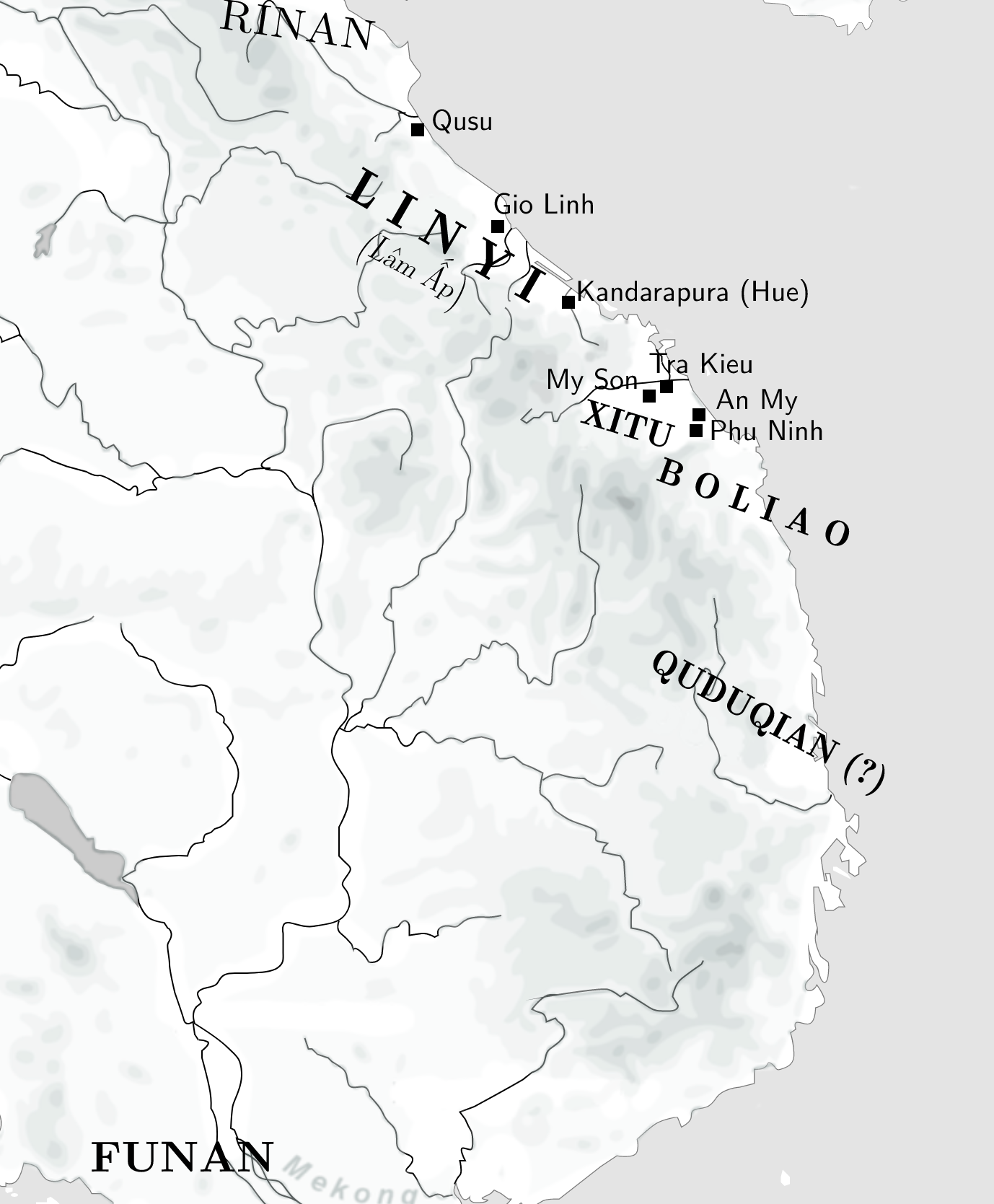
- Lâm Ấp in c. 400 AD
- Capital: Kandarapura; Simhapura (disputed)
- Common languages: Cham, Sanskrit
- Religion: Cham Folk religion Buddhism; Hinduism (After 380)
- Government: Monarchy
- King of Lâm Ấp
  - 192–220: Sri Mara
  - 572–629: Sambhuvarman
- Historical era: Classical Antiquity
  - Established: 192
  - Becoming Champa: 629
Preceded by	Succeeded by
Han dynasty	Champa
- Today part of: Vietnam

Lâm Ấp (Vietnamese pronunciation of Middle Chinese 林邑 *liɪm ʔˠiɪp̚, standard Chinese: Línyì) was a kingdom located in central Vietnam that existed from around 192 AD to 629 AD in what is today central Vietnam, and was one of the earliest recorded Champa kingdoms. The name Linyi however had been employed by official Chinese histories from 192 to even 758 AD to describe a particular early Champa kingdom located north of the Hải Vân Pass. The ruins of its capital, the ancient city of Kandapurpura is now located in Long Tho Hill, 3 kilometers to the west of the city of Huế.

Earlier western scholarship believed Linyi in Chinese records to refer to Champa itself, but Champa expansion northwards may have resulted in the Chinese applying the name Linyi to the Champa imperial city Trà Kiệu (Simhapura) along with Mỹ Sơn Sanctuary and the Thu Bồn River valley around 600 AD.

== History ==
Lâm Ấp was founded by Khu Liên (Ōu Lián 甌連, EMC: *ʔəw-lian, English: Sri Mara), a Cham leader who led a successful rebellion against the Han dynasty in Tượng Lâm (Xianglin) county (modern-day Huế city) in 192. However, the event that led to the founding of the kingdom is still debated. According to Đại Việt sử ký toàn thư, Khu Liên's rebellion broke out in 137, he led thousands of Chams to rebel against the Han prefect in Tượng Lâm. The rebellion lasted for one year, until 138 when the rebels agreed to make peace with the Han's governors. History records don't clarify the terms of the peace agreements between the Han dynasty governors and the rebels, so it remains unclear what happened to Khu Liên after that event. However, while Đại Việt sử ký toàn thư mentions his name in the uprising in 137, An Nam chí lược states that the rebellion was led by 'barbarians' and does not mention him by name. Keith W. Taylor's The Birth of the Vietnam (1983) places the uprising in 192, while no Vietnamese or Chinese historical sources record any uprising occurring in Tượng Lâm or Jiaozhi in that year. As historical sources date the year Khu Liên declared himself King of Lâm Ấp and founded the kingdom to 192, this has led to the hypothesis that 'Khu Liên' may have been a noble title used by multiple leaders, due to the gap between 138 and 192. Khu Liên might have been mentioned as Śrī Māra in the Võ Cạnh stele which was erected around 4th century AD.

During the Three Kingdoms period of China, turmoil plagued the region of Jiaozhou. In 248, Lâm Ấp force invaded from the south, seized most of Rinan, and marched on into Jiuzhen, provoking major uprisings there and in Jiaozhi. One Jiaozhi rebel commanded thousands and invested several walled towns before Wu officials got him to surrender. The maternal grandson of Khu Liên, Phạm Hùng attacked Jiaozhou with aid from Funan.

In the early period of Jin dynasty, the imperial court favored the southern trade networks with the prosperous kingdoms of Funan and Lâm Ấp. Along with this brief peacetime "boom" in the southern trade, Jiaozhi and Jiuzhen enjoyed some autonomy from China until the 320s. Frustrated by the difficulty of trade, Lâm Ấp itself resorted from 323 to seaborne raids on northern ports in Jiaozhou. In 347, king Fan Wen (范文) attacked Jin-controlled Jiaozhou with 40–50,000 troops. In 399, Phạm Hồ Đạt (Fàn Húdá) or Bhadravarman I (r. 380?–413?) tried to seize the coast of Jiaozhou and Rinan, and was driven back by Du Yian, the Chinese governor of Jiao. In 413, he attacked Jiao again, but was defeated, captured and beheaded by the Governor of Jiaozhou, Du Xuedu. His son Gaṅgārāja or Fan Dizhen/Phạm Địch Chớn soon abdicated the throne and went on pilgrimage to the Ganges river in India, although that might be two different persons. In 420, Phạm Dương Mại I (r. ?–421) launched a new attack against the Jin, but was driven back and more than half of Lâm Ấp's people were slaughtered. In 431, his son Phạm Dương Mại II (r. 421–446) again attacked, but again was driven back. The next year, Phạm Dương Mại II sent an embassy to the court of Liu Song asking for the appointment of Prefect of Jiao, which was declined. He then turned against the Khmers and annexed the Khmer district of Panduranga.

In February 446, the Liu Song dynasty led by Tan Hezhi invaded Lâm Ấp, captured Lâm Ấp's capital (near modern Huế). The Chinese attackers plundered its eight temples and treasury, carrying off 100,000 pounds of gold. Despite that, the revived Lâm Ấp was flourishing on the ever more lucrative passing sea trade.

The destruction of Lâm Ấp capital in Huế paved the way for the subsequent emergence of several Chamic kingdoms and chiefdoms south of Lâm Ấp that their connections are remaining unclear, and the country fell into chaos. South of Lam Ap there was the Kingdom of Xitu (Western Citadel) in the Thu Bồn River valley, and Chinese histories told that a refugee from Funan, Jiu Choulou, who "collaborated with the rebels, conquered Linyi and proclaimed himself king" or a usurper named Bhadravarman/Fan Dānggēnchún 范當根純 from Xitu that assassinated the current king because he was the head of the lineage of king Wéndí 文敌 or Manorathavarman in 490 AD, acknowledged by the Chinese in the next year. By 530, a descendant of king Wendi, Rudravarman I (r. 529–572), was recognized as king of Linyi by the Chinese Liang dynasty.

In 534, Rudravarman I sent an embassy to China. In 543, he attacked Lý Bôn in Jiaozhou who was in revolt against the Liang dynasty but was defeated by Lý Bôn's general Phaum Tu. In 595, Sambhuvarman (r. 572–629) sent a tribute gift to the Sui dynasty. In 605 Yang Chien ordered Liu Fang to invade Lâm Ấp. Chinese troops captured the Cham capital of Trà Kiệu, plundered the city. While returning to China, Liu Fang and his army were decimated by diseases.

Since 629, the Chams had used the name "Champa" (Vietnamese: Chăm Pa) to refer their state. Sambhuvarman's son Kandarpadharma (r. 629–640) was the first Cham king officially to offer the title śrī campeśvara (Lord of Campa) of Campādeśa (the country of Champa). However official Chinese historical texts maintained to usage of the name Linyi for a while, until the last Linyi mission to the Tang court in 749 was reported having been sent by a ruler named Lútuóluó 盧陀羅, or perhaps Rudravarman II (r. 741–758), but is still blunder in some extent.

From the mid-8th century, Chinese xenonym for Champa had changed from Linyi to Huánwáng (環王), an area that likely located in the north of the realm.

By the 9th century Zhànchéng 占城 (MC: *tɕiam-dʑiajŋ) had been become the official Chinese designation for Champa, makes it clear that Champa was directly former Linyi, although there were earlier Chinese Buddhist pilgrims Xuanzang and Yijing mentions of "Champa" in the name "Zhàn Pó" 占婆. Historian Anton O. Zakharov anticipates that the Linyi/Lâm Ấp of Chinese and Vietnamese histories and the center of Cham kingdom in Cham history are seemed unlikely to be related.

== Linyi and Champa theory ==
Recent academics, tracing from the work of Rolf Stein in 1947 with new archaeological and historical evidence, discard the early French scholar Georges Maspero's classical narrative of 'a vividly unified Champa'. Michael Vickery, an outspoken critic of Maspero's The Champa Kingdom, expresses that there was never a single Champa in history and the linking of Linyi kings to Champa kings is an illusion. From 220 to 645, Chinese annals give almost the same title for rulers of Linyi: Fan 范 (MC: *buam’), that may be connected with the Khmer title poñ found in seventh century Khmer inscriptions. Vickery proposes that the Linyi (Huế) of what Chinese historians had described, was not the actual Champa or Chamic at all. Instead, Linyi's demographics might have been predominantly Mon-Khmer, perhaps the Vieto-Katuic ethnolinguistic branch. The Cham, originally from Tra Kieu and the Thu Bồn River valley, were expanding northward and absorbed the old Linyi during the fifth and sixth centuries AD. Chinese annalists, unaware of that Chamic northward expansion, maltreated the whole realm as Linyi but it was not. Only centuries later when the Chinese figured out Champa and the Cham, the polities had already developed to become important trade partners or established political ties with Imperial China.

== Culture ==
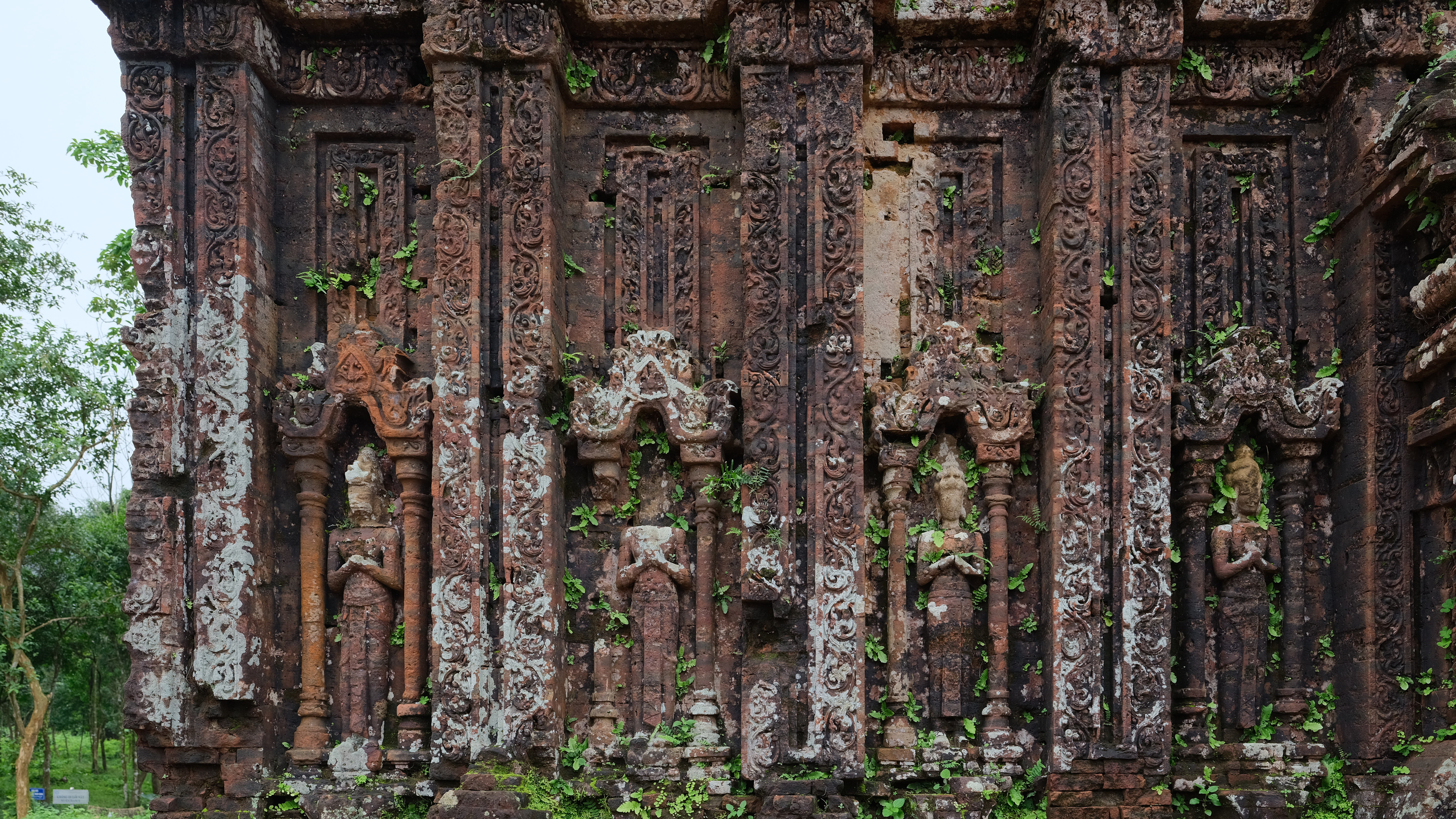
My Son Temple in Tra Kieu

The later capital of Lam Ap in the Thu Bồn River valley, Simhapura, was founded by King Bhadravarman in late-fourth century. Although there are disputes among historians and researchers about Tra Kieu, archaeologists, such as Yamagata (2007), believe that Lam Ap was early Champa, and Trà Kiệu symbolizes the state development of a unified Cham polity. The third inscription of Bhadravarman is the oldest surviving text in Cham language and also any Southeast Asian language. He was also the first known person to order the constructing of the first Śiva lingam, a symbol of Saivaism, in the region. His temple was reported having been destroyed by fire in the six century, and still remains today as one of oldest historical structures in Southeast Asia ever been built and used.

Archaeological excavations recovered artifacts from Go Cam, near Tra Kieu (Simhapura) dated from late second century AD to the third century show that early Lâm Ấp had a significant amount of Chinese influences before the Indianization. These artifacts include some fragments of tiles and seal inscribed Chinese characters "Seal of the Envoy of the Yellow God," however they might be artifacts left by the previous Han Rinan government. It appears that early Champa also might have been a commercial center, with Roman/Mediterranean and Indian ware sherds, blue glass cullet, glass jewelry rediscovered among Chinese sealings, roof tiles, mirrors, coins, daggers, silk, and pottery.

From the third to fifth centuries, there were dozens of small Chamic kingdoms and chiefdoms popped up south of Hue to modern-day Phan Rang. Stone sculptures of Cham folk divinities admixed with Hindu aesthetic dating from fifth to sixth centuries AD were found in those settlements.

== Rulers ==
- Khu Liên 192–220
- Phạm Hùng 220–284
- Phạm Dật 284–336
- Phạm Văn 336–349
- Phạm Phật 349–380
- Phạm Hồ Đạt 380–413
- Gangaraja (Phạm Địch Chớn) ?–?
- Manorathavarman ?–?
- Gangarajavarman II (Phạm Địch Văn) ?–420
- Phạm Dương Mại I 421–431
- Phạm Dương Mại II 431–446
- Jaya Jayavarman I (Phạm Thần Thành) 455–472
- Fan Danggenchun/Jiu Chouluo 472?–492?
- Phạm Chư Nông 492–498
- Phạm Văn Tẩn 498–510
- Jaya Devavarman (Phạm Thiên Khởi) 510–526
- Jaya Vijayavarman 526–529? (弼毳跋摩, MC: *bit-tshwiajh-bɑt-mɑ)
- Rudravarman I 529–572
- Jaya Sambhuvarman (Phạm Phạn Chí) 572–629

== See also ==
- Xitu
- Boliao
- Quduqian
- Hồ Tôn Tinh

== Sources ==
- Aymonier, Etienne (1893). The History of Tchampa (the Cyamba of Marco Polo, Now Annam Or Cochin-China). Oriental University Institute. ISBN 978-1-14997-414-8.
- Boisselier, Jean (1963). La statuaire du Champa (in French). Paris, France: École Française d'Extrême-Orient. ASIN B0014Y6TPQ.
- Coedès, George (1968). Walter F. Vella (ed.). The Indianized States of Southeast Asia. trans.Susan Brown Cowing. University of Hawaii Press. ISBN 978-0-824-80368-1.
- Glover, Ian (2011), "Excavations at Gò Cấm, Quảng Nam, 2000–3: Linyi and the Emergence of the Cham Kingdoms", in Lockhart, Bruce; Trần, Kỳ Phương (eds.), The Cham of Vietnam: History, Society and Art, Hawaii: University of Hawaii Press, pp. 54–80
- Hall, Daniel George Edward (1981). History of South East Asia. Macmillan Education, Limited.
- Higham, Charles (2014). Early Mainland Southeast Asia: From First Humans to Angkor. River Books. ISBN 978-6-1673-3944-3.
- Kiernan, Ben (2019). Việt Nam: a history from earliest time to the present. Oxford University Press.
- Yamagata, Mariko (2011), "Trà Kiệu during the Second and Third Centuries CE: The Formation of Linyi from an Archaeological Perspective", in Lockhart, Bruce; Trần, Kỳ Phương (eds.), The Cham of Vietnam: History, Society and Art, Hawaii: University of Hawaii Press, pp. 81–101
- Maspero, Georges (2002). The Champa Kingdom. White Lotus Co., Ltd. ISBN 978-9-74753-499-3.
- Miksic, John Norman; Yian, Goh Geok (2016). Ancient Southeast Asia. Routledge.
- Vickery, Michael (2009), "A short history of Champa", in Hardy, Andrew David; Cucarzi, Mauro; Zolese, Patrizia (eds.), Champa and the Archaeology of Mỹ Sơn (Vietnam), NUS Press, pp. 45–61, ISBN 978-9-9716-9451-7
