= Gò Cấm =

Vietnamese Iron Age archaeological site

The location of the Go Cam site.

Gò Cấm is an archaeological site located in Duy Trung Commune, Duy Xuyên district, Quảng Nam province, Vietnam. The site is located nearby to another significant site, that of Trà Kiệu. Both are considered important sites for understanding the history of the Hindu Champa Kingdom.

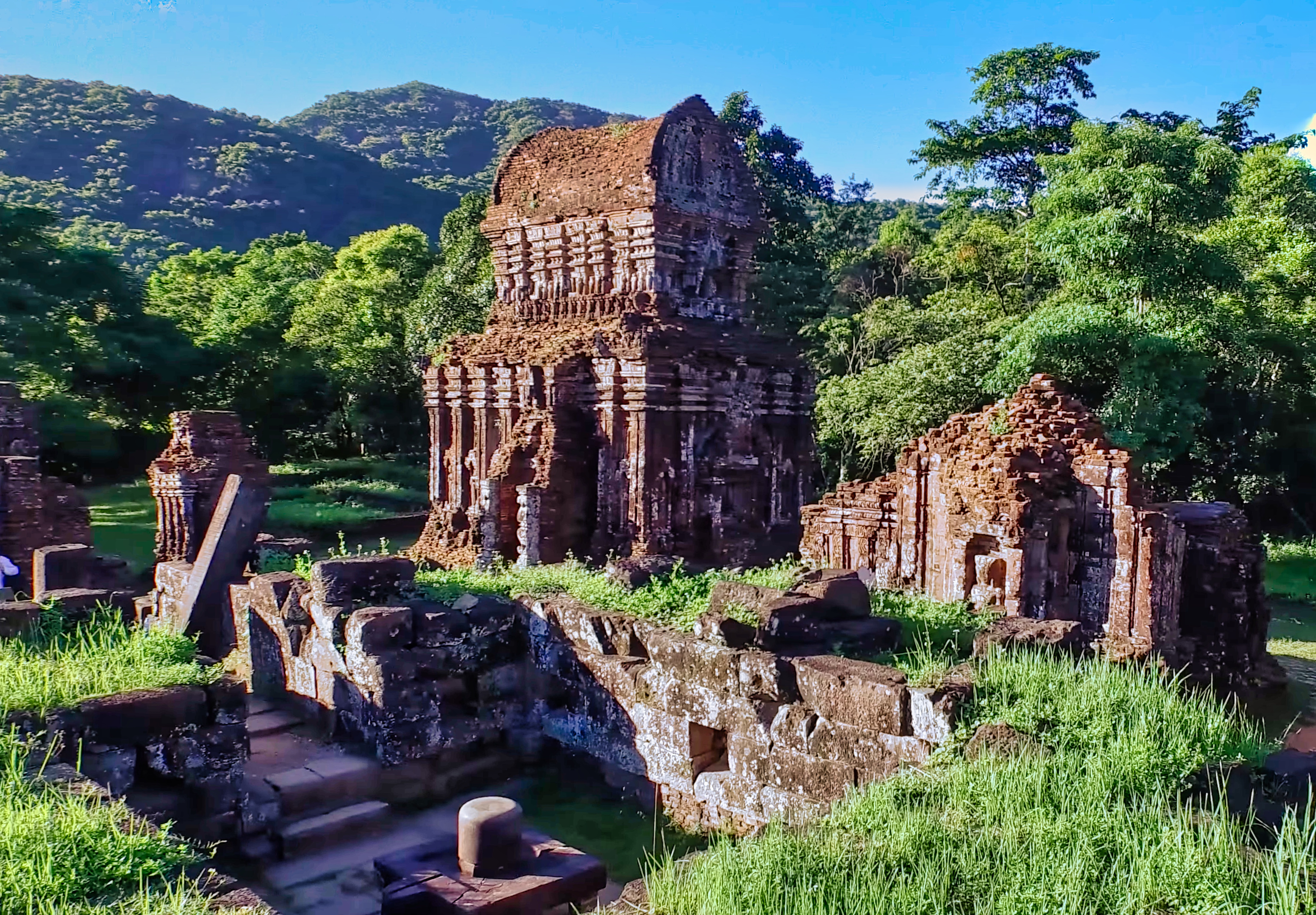
The ruins of nearby Champa site My Son, in the Thu Bon River valley.

== Geography ==
Gò Cấm is located to the south of the Ba Ren river, itself a tributary of the greater Thu Bon River valley, an area characterised by "rice paddy fields and a complex network of ditches". Another nearby river, Cay Thi originates in My Son, connecting Chiem Son Tay, Trà Kiệu, Go Cam and Hoi An. Go Cam is 3.5 kilometres downstream from Trà Kiệu, and located 15 km away from Hoi An, on the coast. Go Cam is found at 108° 15' 90" East and 15° 48' 53".

== History ==
Go Cam is a settlement closely related to Trà Kiệu, one of the major Cham capitals between 4th and the 8th century AD. Go Cam, as with Trà Kiệu, was connected by the Cay Thi river to polities like My Son and Chiem Son Tay, which saw the dispersal of elements of Han Chinese and 1st millennium AD Indian culture (including the name "Champa" itself) through the branches of the Mekong Delta, across the Truong Son Mountain Ranges.

Research at Go Cam has demonstrated two main periods of activity at the site. The first is an earlier, lower layer containing evidence of Sa Huynh settlement, mainly through pottery. The second is a later, upper layer containing more extensive evidence for occupation, including a large burned building, ovoid jars, stamped pottery as well as iron, bronze and a variety of exotic artefacts. The significance of archaeological research Go Cam is twofold. First, in understanding the degree of continuity and change between these two archaeological horizons, which appear to represent the transition between prehistory to the emergence of Champa in eastern Vietnam. Second, in informing the degree to which Han China and India were instrumental in shaping Champa culture in its incipient form.

== Material Culture ==
The material culture of the Go Cam settlement is extensive, with tens of thousands of pottery sherds document over the five seasons of archaeological excavation. The preserved burnt building, also presents a wealth of evidence for interpretation.

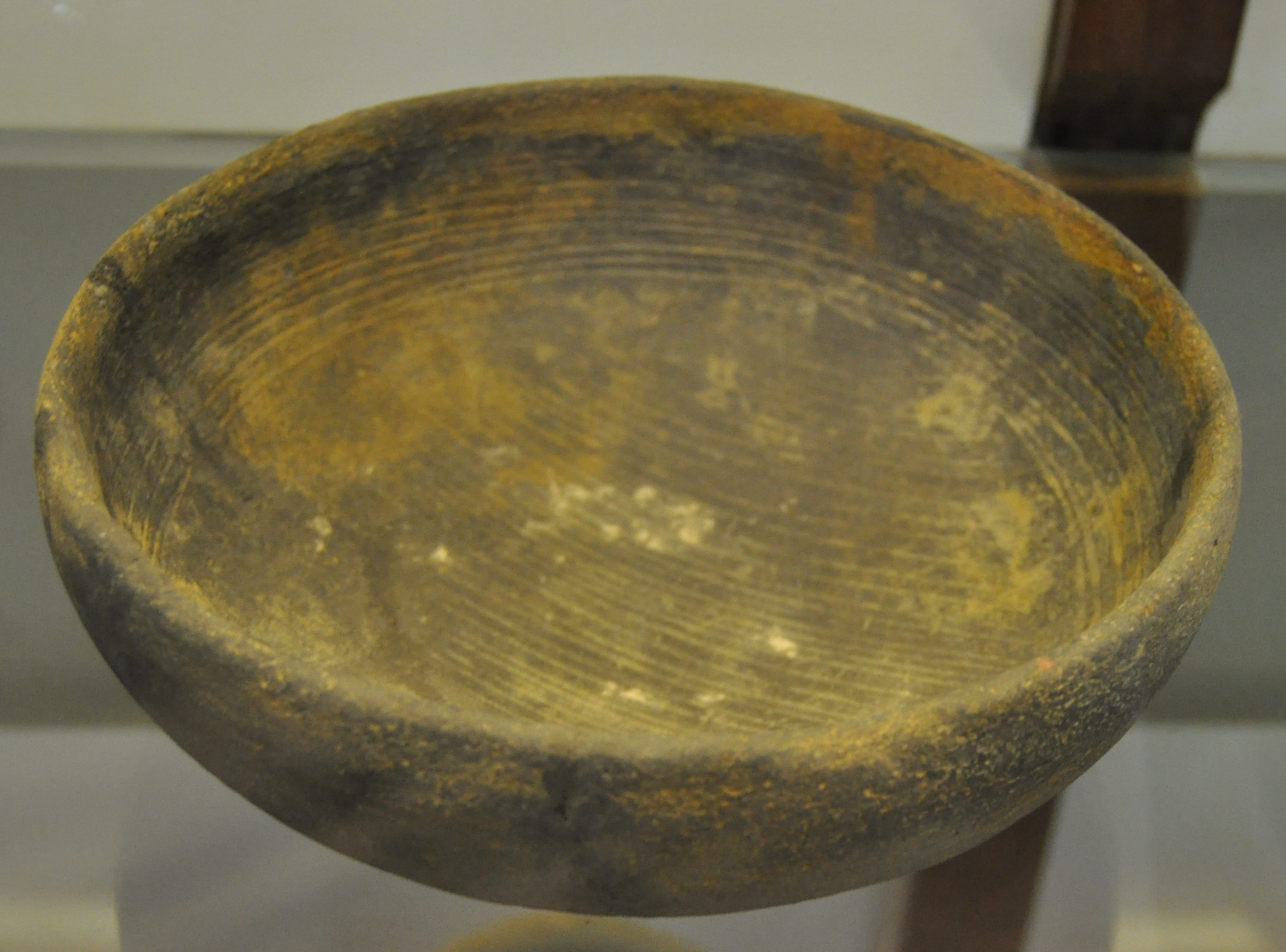
An example of an Sa Huỳnh unfooted ceramic bowl.

=== Ceramics ===
The principle evidence for the earlier, distinctly Sa Huỳnh period of occupation is a wealth of ceramic types found at the site. Ovoid jars, of which tens of complete and hundreds of broken samples were excavated at Go Cam, demonstrate a temporal continuity between Go Cam and the earliest layers of Trà Kiệu, in the 1st and 2nd centuries AD. The propensity for various other forms of local ceramics, such as broad, cord marked cooking pots, and unfooted shallow bowls, similarly indicates a distinctive Sa Huynh cultural context. In later layers, examples of increasingly exotic ceramics, such as various glaze or semi-glazed Han ceramics demonstrate the Chinese and Indian influence that characterises the formative stages of Cham civilisation. In particular, two unfired clay sealings, bearing extant Chinese script which Ian Glover (2006, p. 224) described as "the most outstanding findings", represent the earliest examples of such seals found in Vietnam.

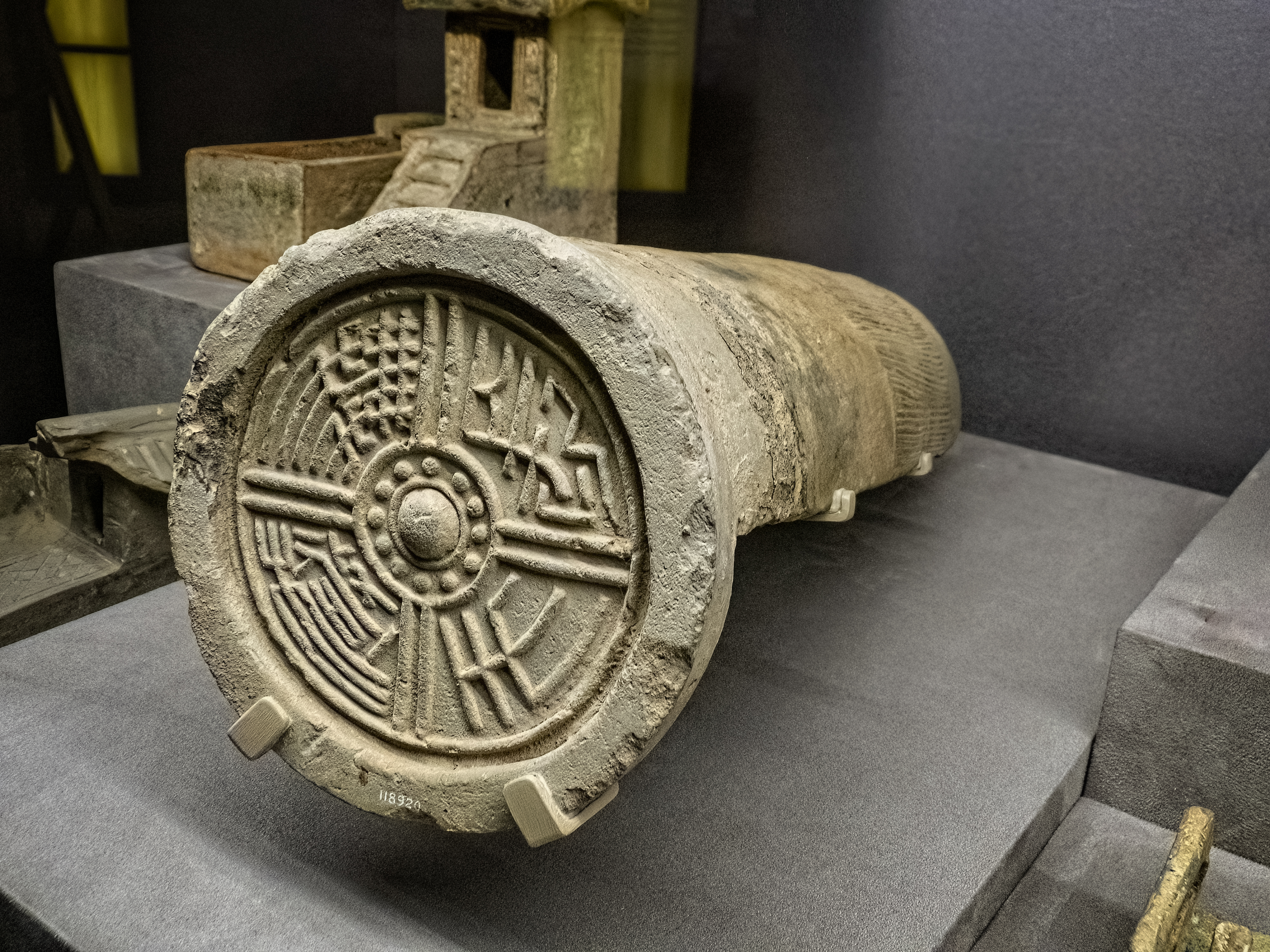
Semi-cylindrical contemporary Han Chinese roof tiles similar to those found at Go Cam.

Evidence for increasing Indian influence is demonstrated in various sherds of Indo-Roman rouletted ware, various glass beads, and an unusually design ceramic jar with stamped designs reminiscent of styles found in contemporary south Indian contexts.

=== Burnt Wooden Building ===
The most extensive archaeological remains at the site were that of a burnt wooden structure, the extent of which was revealed in subsequent excavations to be at least 13 by 7.8 metres. Various radiocarbon dates were taken from the carbonised structure, which when paired with the material culture, placed the construction of the building around the late 2nd century AD. Layers beneath the remains of the building containing early Sa Huynh cultural deposits, has led researchers to determine it was constructed upon an earlier site. The Han manufactured roofing tiles, some of which being longer than 60 cm, support the dating of the structure to a period referred to by the researchers as 'proto-Champa'.

== Linyi vs Champa theories ==
Another approach to understanding the historical significance of Go Cam is in its relationship with Linyi, also known as Lâm Ấp, a Kingdom located in Central Vietnam dating from the 2nd to the 7th century AD. Proponents of Linyi theory, a model stemming from research surrounding early aerial photography conducted by J.-Y. Claeys in 1927, argue against the concept of an emerging 'unified Champa', a concept developed by mid-20th century sinologists such as Rolf Stein and Georges Maspero.

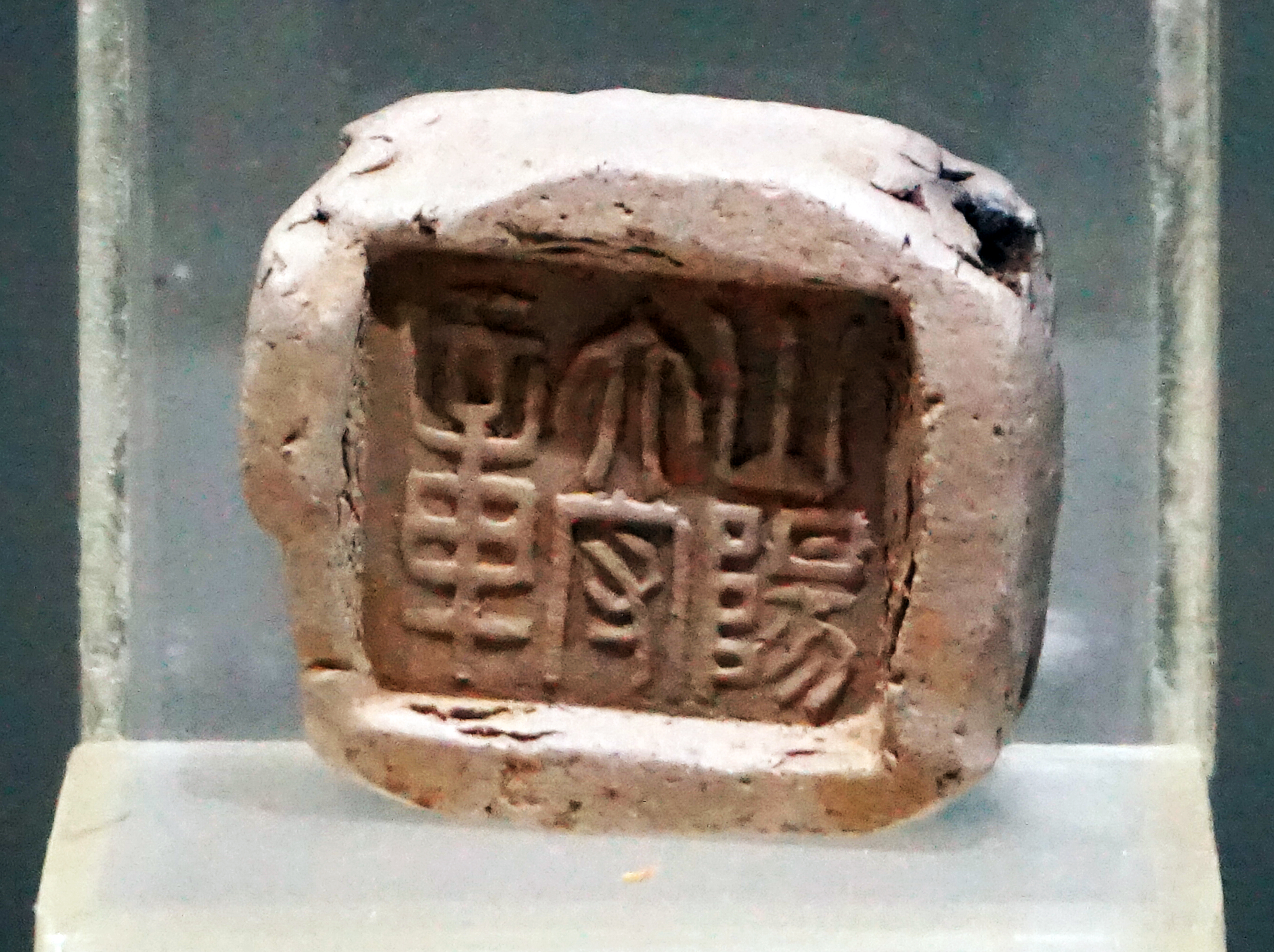
Extant Han Chinese clay sealing, bearing Chinese script. Those found in Go Cam are the only of their kind in Vietnam.

Recent historical and archaeological evidence has led to scholars such as Michael Vickery identifying continuity between Chinese influence in the region, and the etymological similarity of the titles for rulers of Linyi, and 7th century AD Khmer titles, both attested in historical annals and inscriptions. The considerable presence of Chinese cultural influence at both Go Cam and Tra Kieu led scholars such as Claeys to identify Tra Kieu as the capital of Linyi, though this remains unproven, and has received considerable academic scrutiny and criticism.
