= Our Lady of Trà Kiệu =

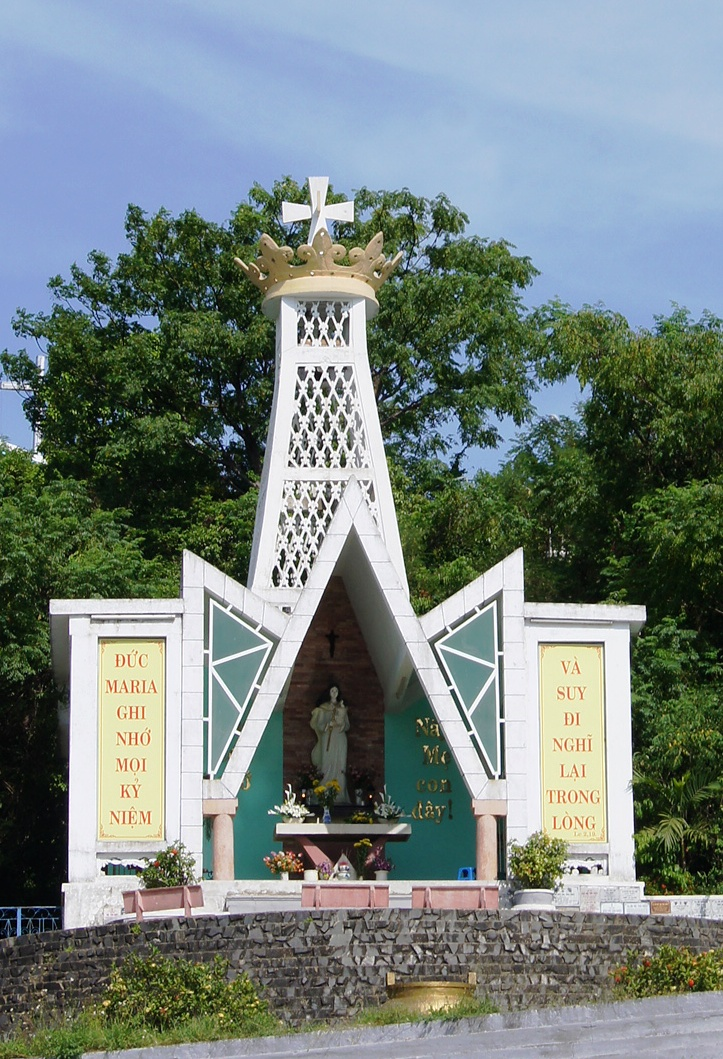
The Shrine of Our Lady of Trà Kiệu in Duy Xuyên district, Quảng Nam province

Our Lady of Trà Kiệu (Vietnamese: Đức Mẹ Trà Kiệu) is the name given by Vietnamese Catholics to a Marian apparition in a shrine built in 1898 on Bửu Châu hill east of Trà Kiệu village in Duy Sơn commune, Duy Xuyên district, Quảng Nam province, Vietnam. The shrine was dedicated to Our Lady Help of Christians in remembrance of the Virgin Mary's help in the Catholic resistance to the Cần Vương movement at this location in 1885. On May 31, 1971, Bishop Phêrô Maria Phạm Ngọc Chi selected Trà Kiệu as the location of the Marian Center of the Roman Catholic Diocese of Đà Nẵng. The diocese organizes an annual Our Lady of Trà Kiệu Festival on May 31.

== See also ==
- Our Lady of La Vang
