= Hồ Tôn Tinh =

Legendary, semi-mythical period in the Chams historiography

Hồ Tôn Tinh (Chinese: 胡猻精, Husunxing) or Hồ Tôn (Chinese: 胡猻, Husun) was an ancient Champa kingdom that was mentioned in some Vietnamese textbooks.

== History ==
The first mention of Hồ Tôn Tinh was from the 14th-century semi-fictional work of Lĩnh Nam chích quái, with "The story of Dạ Xoa" (Chinese: 夜叉王傳, Vietnamese: Truyện Dạ Xoa):

昔在上古辰，南越甌貉國之外有妙岩國，王號夜叉王。一曰長明王，一曰十頭王。其國北接胡猻精國，胡猻精國王曰十車王，太子曰微〔徵〕姿。微姿之妻曰白靜后娘，容貌美麗，世所罕有，夜叉見而悅之，乃率眾攻圍胡猻精國，擒得白靜后娘，微姿怒，遂領獼猴眾，拔山塞海，盡為平地，攻破妙岩國，殺夜叉王，復取靜后而還。蓋胡猻國，乃獼猴之精。今占城國是也。

In ancient time, aside from Nanyue and Âu Lạc, there was another country called Diệu Nghiêm, its ruler was Dạ Xoa (also known as King Trường Minh or Ten-Head King). The north of this country bordered Hồ Tôn Tinh State, Hồ Tôn Tinh's king was called Dasharatha ("Ten Chariots King"), and its crown prince was Vi Tư, whose wife was Bạch Tịnh, known for her unique beauty. King Dạ Xoa was excited about this, so he led an army, attacked Hồ Tôn Tinh, and successfully kidnapped princess Bạch Tịnh. Vi Tư, with anger, brought an army of monkeys, razed mountains and seas into plains, destroyed Diệu Nghiêm, killed Dạ Xoa, and escorted Bạch Tịnh backed home.

— 夜叉王傳、嶺南摭怪

=== Territory ===
The 15th-century national chronicle of Đại Việt sử ký toàn thư (ĐVSKTT) and Trần Trọng Kim's 20th-century Việt Nam sử lược (VNSL) both mentioned Hồ Tôn Tinh as a southern neighboring country of the semi-mythical Hồng Bàng–ruled kingdom, with ĐVSKTT said that Hồ Tôn bordered Văn Lang (2524–258 BC) while VNSL believed it bordered Xích Quỷ (2879–2524 BC).

南接胡孫國，即占城國，今廣南是也。

To the south [of Văn Lang 文郎] borders the country of Hồ Tôn, which is the country of Champa, now is part of Quảng Nam.

— 卷之一、鴻厖氏紀、大越史記全書

=== Ruling clan ===
According to the 19th century veritable records of Đại Nam thực lục, volume 33 of Đại Nam chính biên liệt truyện sơ tập, Hồ Tôn was a Cham kingdom ruled by the Việt Thường clan (Chinese: 越裳氏, Yueshang).

占城，古胡孫國，屬越裳氏部。

Champa, was the ancient country of Hồ Tôn, belonged to the Việt Thường clan.

— 卷之三十二、占城、大南正編列傳初集、大南寔錄

=== Fall ===
There was no mention of to why or how Hồ Tôn Tinh might have collapsed. But since the country was believed to be located somewhere in Quảng Nam, it is possible that Hồ Tôn Tinh fell because of an invasion from Nanyue.

== Influence from Indian culture ==
According to Huber in La Légende du Ramayana en Annam, Etudes indochinoises, the story of Hồ Tôn Tinh was probably the ancient Champa's version of Ramayana. There, Dasanana' was named Dạ Xoa, Rama was called Prince Vi Tư, and Sita was Princess Bạch Tịnh.

== See also ==
- Lâm Ấp
- Xitu
- Quduqian
