= Sui–Lâm Ấp war =

605 Chinese invasion of Champa

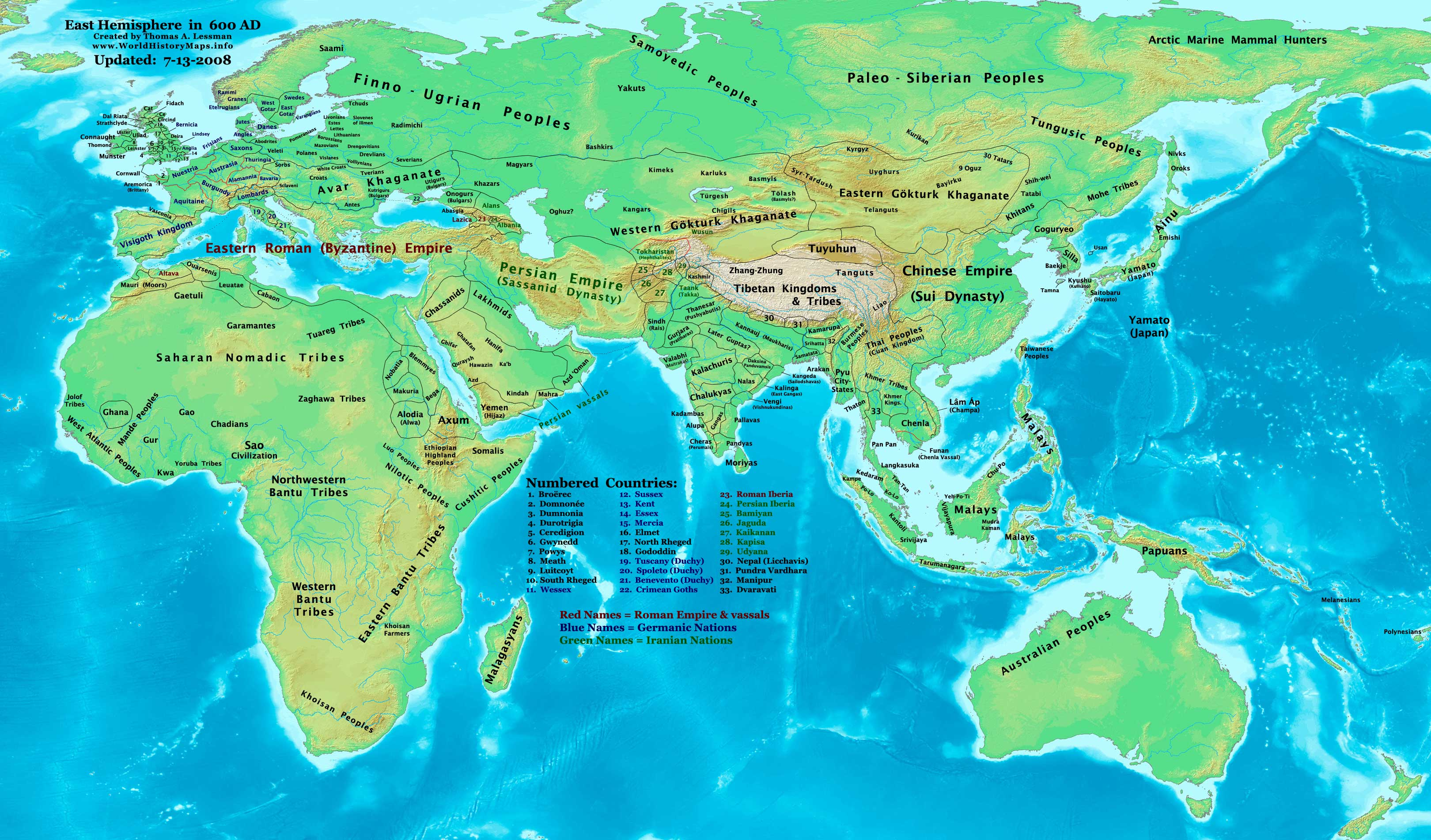
- Sui empire and Lâm Ấp on the world map
Date	605
Location	Central Vietnam
Result	Sui victory
Territorial changes	Sui dynasty briefly ruled over Champa territories

Belligerents
Lâm Ấp	Sui dynasty

Commanders and leaders
Sambhuvarman (Phạm Phạn Chi)	Emperor Yang of Sui; Liu Fang

Strength
–	27,000

Casualties and losses
Unknown	Unknown

The Sui–Lâm Ấp war was an invasion launched by the Chinese Sui dynasty against the Cham kingdom of Lâm Ấp in 605.

== Background ==
Around 540s, the region of Jiaozhou (northern Vietnam) saw the uprising of the local Lý clan led by Lý Bí. In 589, the Sui dynasty defeated the Chen dynasty and unified China proper. As the authority of the Sui gradually consolidated in this region when Lý Phật Tử, the ruler of Vạn Xuân in Jiaozhou accepted Sui overlordship. In 595, king Sambhuvarman (r. 572–629) of Lâm Ấp, a Cham kingdom with its capital Kandapurpura located around modern-day Huế, prudently sent tribute to the Sui. However, there was a myth in China which postulated that Champa was an immensely rich area, sparking the interest of Sui officials.

In 601, the Chinese official Xi Linghu forwarded an imperial summons for Phật Tử to appear at Chang'an, the Sui capital. Deciding to resist this demand, Phật Tử sought to delay by requesting that the summons be postponed until after the new year. Xi approved the request, believing that he could keep Phật Tử's allegiance by exercising restraint. However, Xi was accused of taking a bribe from Phật Tử, and the court grew suspicious. When Phật Tử openly rebelled early in 602, Xi was promptly arrested; he died while being taken north. In 602, Emperor Wen of Sui ordered general Liu Fang to launch a surprise attack on Phật Tử from Yunnan with 27 battalions. Unprepared to resist an assault of this scale, Phật Tử heeded Fang's admonition to surrender and was sent to Chang'an. Lý Phật Tử and his subordinates were decapitated to preclude future trouble. From recaptured Jiaozhou, Yang Jian authorized Liu Fang to attack Lâm Ấp, located south of Jiaozhou.

== Course ==
The Sui invasion of Champa consisted of a land force and a naval squadron led by Liu Fang. Sambhuvarman deployed war elephants and confronted the Chinese. Linyi's elephant corps at first found some success against the invaders. Liu Fang then ordered troops to dig booby traps and covered them with camouflaged leaves and grass. The elephants alerted by traps, turning back and trampling on their own troops. Disarraying Cham army were then defeated by Chinese archers. The Chinese force broke through to the capital and pillaged the city. Among their spoils were eighteen golden tablets dedicated to the memory of the eighteen preceding kings of Lâm Ấp, a Buddhist library comprising 1,350 works in the local language, and an orchestra from a kingdom in the Mekong basin. The Sui immediately set up an administration in Lâm Ấp and divided the country into 3 counties: Tỷ Ảnh, Hải Âm and Tượng Lâm. On the route back to China, the invading force was hit by an outbreak of disease which killed large numbers of the officers and men, including Liu Fang.

== Aftermath ==
The Sui effort to administer parts of Champa directly was short-lived. Sambuvarman reasserted his power and sent an embassy to the Sui to "acknowledge his fault." The Cham quickly regained independence during the troubles accompanying the collapse of the Sui empire, and sent a gift to the new Tang Empire's ruler in 623.

== Bibliography ==
- Schafer, Edward Hetzel (1967), The Vermilion Bird: T'ang Images of the South, Los Angeles: University of California Press, ISBN 9780520011458
- Taylor, Keith Weller (1983), The Birth of the Vietnam, University of California Press, ISBN 9780520074170
- Wright, Arthur F. (1979), "The Sui dynasty (581–617)", in Twitchett, Denis Crispin; Fairbank, John King (eds.), The Cambridge History of China: Sui and T'ang China, 589-906 AD, Part One. Volume 3, Cambridge: Cambridge University Press, pp. 48–149, ISBN 9780521214469
