= Quduqian =

Kingdom of Quduqian
- 3rd century–?
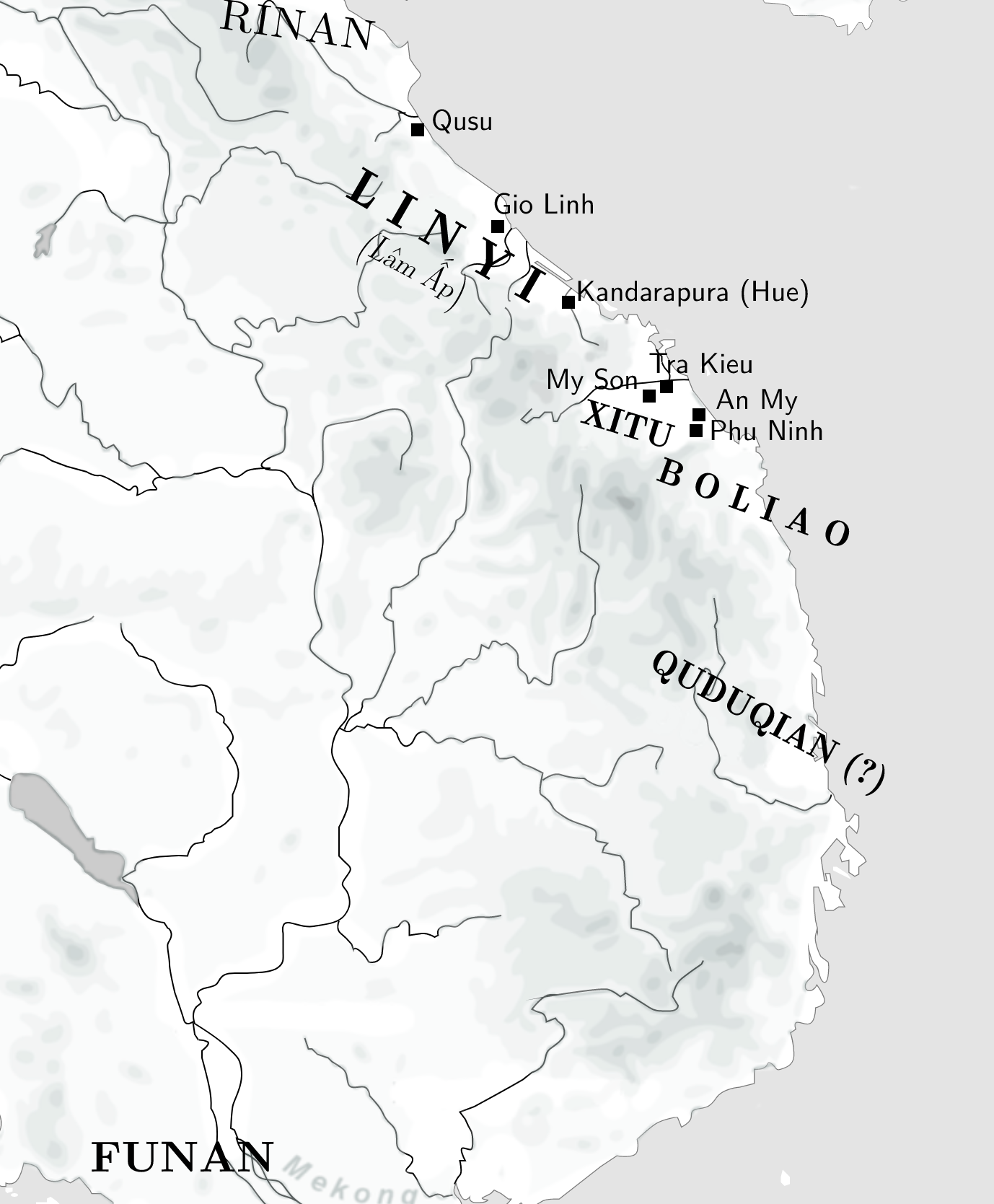
- Quduqian in c. 300 AD
- Common languages: Chamic languages, Bahnaric languages
- Historical era: Classical Antiquity
  - Established: 3rd century
  - Disestablished: ?
Preceded by	Succeeded by
Sa Huỳnh culture; Han dynasty	Champa
- Today part of: Vietnam

Quduqian (Vietnamese: Khuất-đô-can; Chinese: 屈都乾; pinyin: Qūdūqián) was the Chinese designation for an ancient kingdom, chiefdom, or a polity that perhaps located around Binh Dinh province, Central Vietnam, then became part of Champa Kingdoms.

According to the Book of Jin, Quduqian situated 600 li or 186 miles/300 kilometers south of Boliao (波遼國, Tam Kỳ). Quduqian sent an embassy to the Jin court in Luoyang in 286 AD.

== See also ==
- History of Champa
- Other early states in Central Vietnam
  - Lâm Ấp
  - Xitu
  - Boliao
  - Hồ Tôn Tinh

== Sources ==
- Miksic, John Norman; Yian, Goh Geok (2016). Ancient Southeast Asia. Routledge. ISBN 978-0-41573-554-4.
- Schweyer, Anne-Valérie (2010). "The Birth of Champa". Crossing Borders in Southeast Asian Archaeology, Berlin: 102–117 – via HAL.
