= Old Cham =

Ancient writing of Champa kingdom greatly influenced by Sanskrit

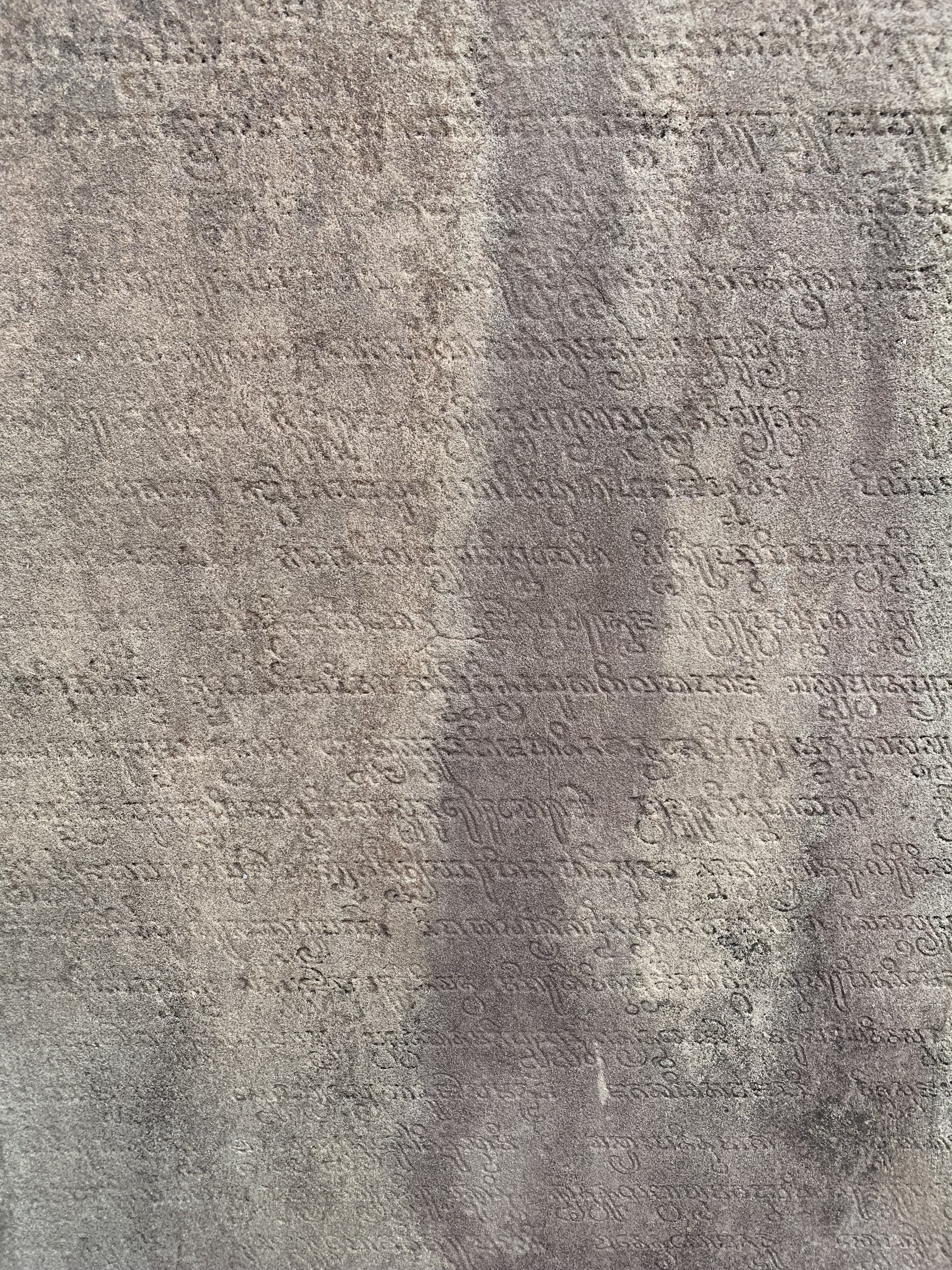
- Native to: Champa
- Region: Central Vietnam
- Era: 4th century–15th century AD
- Language family: Austronesian: Malayo-Polynesian; Malayo-Chamic; Chamic; Old Cham
- Early forms: Proto-Austronesian: Proto-Malayo-Polynesian; Proto-Chamic
- Writing system: Pallava

Language codes
- ISO 639-3: ocm

Cham has the oldest literary history of any Austronesian language. The Dong Yen Chau inscription, written in Old Cham, dates from the late 4th century AD.

== Cham Script ==
The Cham people had their own script, known as the Cham script, which was used for inscriptions on temple walls, steles, and other surfaces. This script is descended from the ancient Indic scripts and is one of the distinguishing features of Cham culture. It has been used for religious and ceremonial purposes.

== Inscriptions ==
Many Old Cham inscriptions have been found on archaeological sites in the areas that were once part of the Champa kingdom. These inscriptions provide valuable insights into the history, religion, and society of the Champa people. Some of the inscriptions are written in the Cham script, and others are in Sanskrit.

== Cultural and religious ==
Old Cham originated from Proto-Chamic languages, however under cultural influence from India, it was greatly influenced by Sanskrit. Old Cham was closely tied to the cultural and religious practices of the Champa Kingdom. Inscriptions often contain information about religious rituals, temple dedications, and the deeds of rulers. Sanskrit, as well as Old Cham, was used in religious texts and inscriptions. In addition, the names of Champa principalities Indrapura, Amaravati, Vijaya, Kauthara, and Panduranga are of Sanskrit origin.

== Transition and decline ==
As the Champa kingdom faced external pressures and eventual annexation by the expanding Vietnamese state, the use of the Old Cham language declined. The language underwent changes and adaptations, and the Cham people became increasingly influenced by the dominant culture of the region.

== Modern times ==
While the Old Cham language is not commonly spoken in its original form today, elements of it have survived in the contemporary Cham language, which is still spoken by Cham communities in Cambodia and Vietnam. Efforts are made to preserve and revitalize the Cham language, and the Cham script is still used for certain ceremonial and religious purposes.
