= Sambhuvarman =

King of Lâm Ấp (d. 629)

Jaya Sambhuvarman
- King of Campādeśa; King of Lâm Ấp (Bestowed by the Sui dynasty)

King of Lâm Ấp
- Reign: 572–629 AD
- Coronation: 572 AD
- Predecessor: Rudravarman I
- Successor: Kandarpadharma
- Born: Unknown
- Died: 629; Simhapura, Champa
Names
- Phạm Phạn Chí (范梵志)
- Dynasty: Simhapura dynasty
- Father: Rudravarman I

Jaya Sambhuvarman of Champa (Chinese: 商菩跋摩 / Shang-bèi-bá-mā), personal name Fan Fanzhi (Chinese: 范梵志), was the king of Lâm Ấp from 572 to 629 AD.

== Relation with Sui China ==
In 595 AD, Sambhuvarman sent tribute to the Sui dynasty of China. Due to a myth that Champa was an immensely rich area, Sui officials began to take a special interest in it; in 605 Yang Chien ordered general Liu Fang to invade Lâm Ấp. Sambhuvarman's army faced off against the Chinese forces with many war elephants. At first they had some success, but Liu Fang's troops dug ditches and covered them with twigs. The elephants were alarmed by the ditches and retreated, causing disorder in Sambhuvarman's army. It was completely routed, with immense slaughter. Liu Fang pursued the Cham remains as far as the bronze column of Ma Yuan.

The capital, Kandapurpura near present-day Huế, was abandoned. Within eight days, the Chinese forces arrived and pillaged the city. Their plunder included over one thousand Buddhist books as well as the gold tablets commemorating the reigns of the previous eighteen kings. The Sui immediately set up an administration in Lâm Ấp and divided the country into 3 counties: Tỷ Ảnh, Hải Âm and Tượng Lâm. Liu Fang cut a stone inscription to commemorate his victory and then started for China, but on the way the army was hit by an outbreak of disease which killed large numbers of the officers and men, including Liu Fang.

The Sui effort to administer parts of Champa directly was short-lived. Sambhuvarman reasserted his power and sent an embassy to the Sui to "acknowledge his fault." The Cham quickly regained independence during the troubles accompanying the collapse of the Sui empire, and sent a gift to the new Tang Empire's ruler in 623.

== Legacy ==
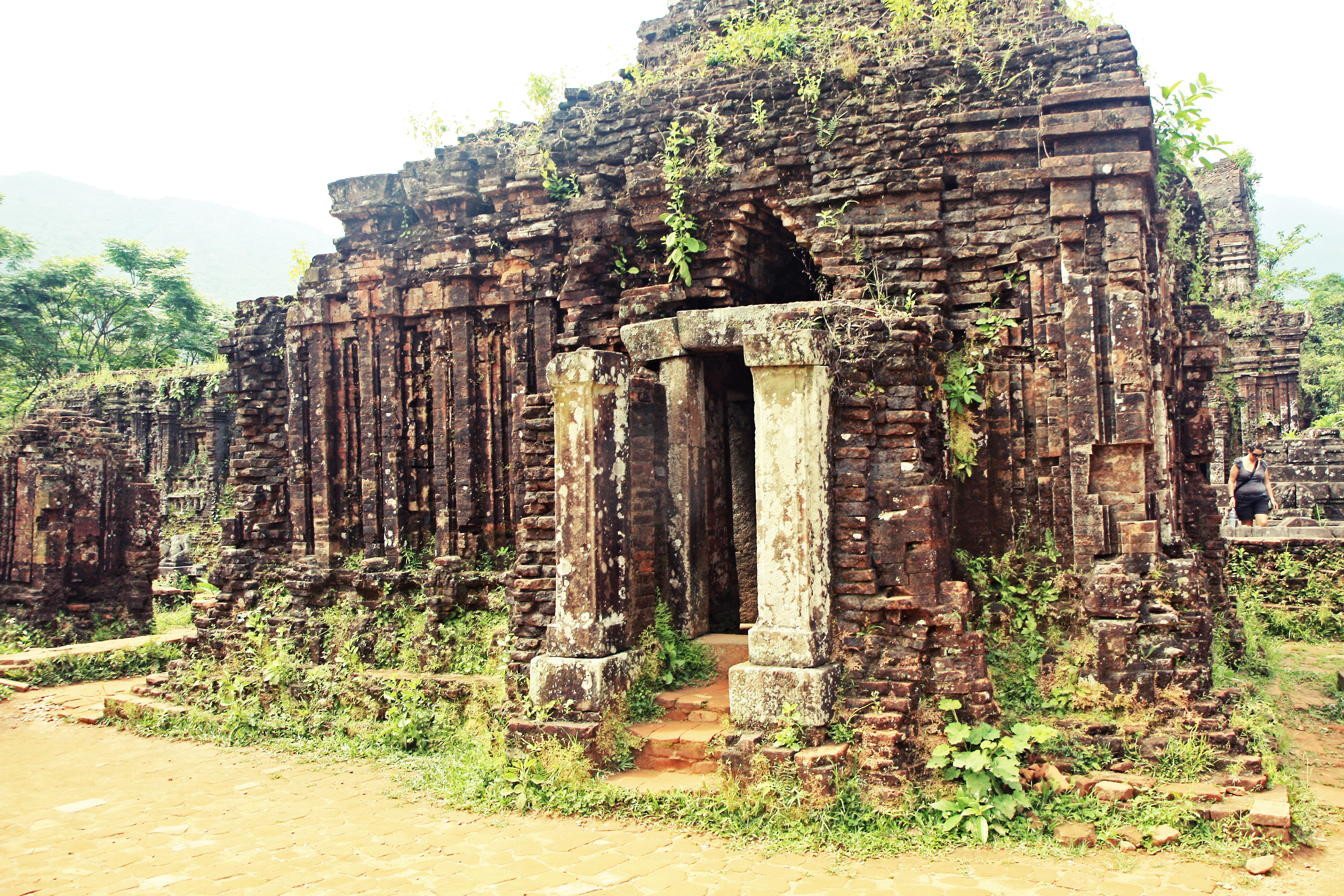
Temple at Mỹ Sơn.

Around 600 AD, Sambhuvarman authorized the construction of the Mỹ Sơn Bhadresvara temple. He reinstalled the god under the name Sambhu-Bhadresvara, and erected a stele to document the event. The stele affirmed that Sambhu-Bhadresvara was the creator of the world and the destroyer of sin, and expressed the wish that he "cause happiness in the kingdom of Champa." The stele also applauded the king himself, claiming that he was "like a terrestrial sun illuminating the night" and that his glory rose "like the moon on an autumn evening."

== Bibliography ==
- Aymonier, Etienne (1893), The History of Tchampa (the Cyamba of Marco Polo, Now Annam Or Cochin-China), Oriental University Institute, ISBN 978-1-14997-414-8
- Higham, Charles (2014), Early Mainland Southeast Asia: From First Humans to Angkor, River Books, ISBN 6-1673-3944-9
- Hubert, Jean-François (2012), The Art of Champa, Parkstone International, ISBN 978-1-780-42964-9
- Maspero, Georges (2002), The Champa Kingdom, White Lotus Co., Ltd, ISBN 978-9-74753-499-3
- Ngô, Văn Doanh (2005), Mỹ Sơn relics, Hanoi: Thế Giới Publishers, OCLC 646634414
- Schafer, Edward Hetzel (1967), The Vermilion Bird: T'ang Images of the South, Los Angeles: University of California Press, ISBN 978-0-52001-145-8
- Taylor, Keith Weller (1983), The Birth of the Vietnam, University of California Press, ISBN 978-0-520-07417-0
- Wright, Arthur F. (1979), "The Sui dynasty (581–617)", in Twitchett, Denis Crispin; Fairbank, John King (eds.), The Cambridge History of China: Sui and T'ang China, 589-906 AD, Part One. Volume 3, Cambridge: Cambridge University Press, pp. 48–149, ISBN 978-0-521-21446-9

Preceded by Rudravarman I 529–572	King of Champa; 572–629	Succeeded by Kandarpadharma 629–?
