= Đông Yên Châu inscription =

Oldest Austronesian inscription, located in Vietnam

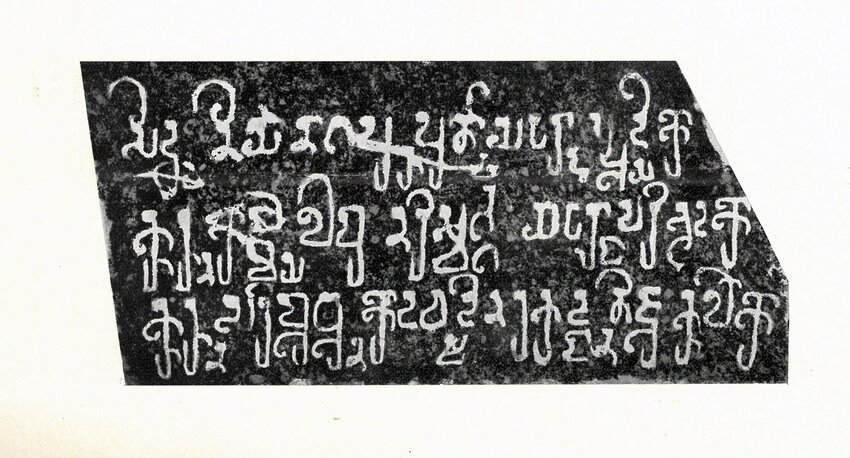
- Rubbing of the inscription, taken by George Cœdès
- Material: Stone
- Writing: Pallava script
- Created: c. 350 A.D.
- Discovered: 1936 (90 years ago) northwest of Trà Kiệu (near Indrapura), Vietnam
- Language: Old Cham

The Đông Yên Châu inscription is an Old Cham inscription written in Pallava script, found in 1936 at Đông Yên Châu, northwest of Trà Kiệu, which used to be the old Champa capital known as Simhapura, in central Vietnam. The inscription was written in prose, is the oldest document of Cham (and indeed of any Austronesian language), and testifies to the existence of indigenous beliefs among the ancient Cham people of the Champa kingdom. Though not itself dated, the phrasing of the inscription is identical to those of dated Sanskrit inscriptions of Bhadravarman I of the second dynasty, who ruled Champa at the end of the 4th century CE. It contains an imprecatory formula ordering respect for the "naga of the king", undoubtedly a reference to the protective divinity of a spring or well. This vernacular text shows that in the 4th century, the land that now constitutes modern-day central Vietnam was inhabited by an Austronesian-speaking population. The evidence, both monumental and palaeographic, also suggests that Hinduism was the predominant religious system.

The fact that the language in the inscription shares some basic grammar and vocabulary with Malay has led some scholars to argue that the inscription contains the oldest specimen of Malay words in the form of Old Malay, older by three centuries than the earliest Srivijayan inscriptions from southeastern Sumatra. However, most scholars consider it established that this inscription was written in Old Cham instead. The shared basic grammar and vocabulary comes as no surprise, since Chamic and Malayic languages are closely related; both are the two subgroups of a Malayic–Chamic group within the Malayo-Polynesian branch of the Austronesian family.

== Text ==
The language of the inscription is not far from modern Cham or Malay in its grammar and vocabulary. The similarities to modern Malay and Cham grammar are evident in the yang and ya relative markers, both found in Cham, in the dengan ("with") and di (locative marker), in the syntax of the equative sentence Ni yang naga punya putauv ("this that serpent possessed by the king"), in the use of punya as a genitive marker, and so on. Indian influence is evident in the Sanskrit terms siddham, a frequently used invocation of fortune; nāga ("serpent, dragon"); svarggah ("heaven"), paribhū ("to insult"), naraka ("hell"), and kulo ("family"). The text of the inscription itself, associated with a well near Indrapura, is short but linguistically revealing:

Transliteration

Siddham! Ni yang nāga punya putauv.
Ya urāng sepuy di ko, kurun ko jemā labuh nari svarggah.
Ya urāng paribhū di ko, kurun saribu thun davam di naraka, dengan tijuh kulo ko.

Word-for-word English equivalent

fortune! this (that) serpent possess king.
(O) person respect (in) him, for him jewels fall from heaven.
(O) person insult (in) him, for one-thousand year remain (in) hell, with seven family he.

English translation

Fortune! this is the divine serpent of the king.
Whoever respects him, for him jewels fall from heaven.
Whoever insults him, he will remain for a thousand years in hell, with seven generations of his family.

Malay translation

Sejahtera! Inilah naga suci kepunyaan Raja.
Orang yang menghormatinya, turun kepadanya permata dari syurga.
Orang yang menghinanya, akan seribu tahun diam di neraka, dengan tujuh keturunan keluarganya.

Western Cham translation

Nabuwah! Ni kung nāga milik patao.
Hây urāng adab tuei nyu, ka pak nyu mâh priak yeh hu plêk mâng syurga mai.
Hâi urāng papndik harakat pak nyu, ka ye saribau thun tram di naraka, hong tajuh mangawom nyu.

Vietnamese translation

Thời vận! Đây là xà thần của người.
Ai tôn trọng người, với ngươi vàng bạc rơi từ thiên đường.
Ai sỉ nhục người, kẻ đó sẽ ở địa ngục nghìn năm, với bảy đời gia đình hắn.

Dong Yen Chau	Proto-Chamic	Malay	Meaning	Notes
ni	*inĭ, *inɛy	ini	this	Short form ni survives; from Proto-Austronesian *i-ni.
nāga		naga	serpent/dragon	From Sanskrit नाग (nāga)
punya		punya	possess	
putauv	*pataw, *pɔtaw		king	
urāng	*ʔuraːŋ	orang	person/people	
sepuy		sopan	to respect	Possibly borrowed from Sanskrit śúbh ("to beautify, to embellish, an auspicious offering") or śobhā́ ("distinguished merit").
labuh	*labuh	labuh	to drop	In modern Malay, labuh means to drop something while it's still attached (e.g., sail, anchor, curtain, skirt)
nari		dari	from	
svarggah		syurga	heaven	From Sanskrit स्वर्ग (svarga)
saribu	*saribɔw	seribu	one thousand	
thun	*thun	tahun	year	From Proto-Malayo-Polynesian *taqun
davam		diam	to stay/remain, also means "silent"	
di	*dĭ	di	in	
naraka		neraka	hell	From Sanskrit नरक (naraka)
dengan	*dəŋan	dengan	with	From Proto-Malayo-Polynesian *deŋan
tijuh	*tujuh	tujuh	seven	
kulo		keluarga	family	From Sanskrit कुल (kula, "family; clan; lineage"). Compare with Malay keluarga, from Sanskrit kula + varga.

== See also ==
- List of languages by first written accounts

== Bibliography ==
- Abdul Rahman Al-Ahmadi (1991), "Old Malay scripts (pre-Jawi) of Champa and Srivijaya", Excerpta Indonesica, 42–48, Centre for Documentation on Modern Indonesia, Royal Institute of Linguistics and Anthropology
- Abdul Rashid Melebek; Amat Juhari Moain (2004), Sejarah Bahasa Melayu (History of the Malay language), Utusan Malaysia Publications, ISBN 978-9-6761-1809-7
- Bellwood, Peter; Glover, Ian (2004), Southeast Asia: From Prehistory to History, Routledge, ISBN 978-0-4153-9117-7
- Coedès, George (1968), The Indianized States of Southeast Asia, University of Hawaii Press, ISBN 978-0-8248-0368-1
- Guy, John (2014), Lost Kingdoms: Hindu-Buddhist Sculpture of Early Southeast Asia, Metropolitan Museum of Art, ISBN 978-0-3002-0437-7
- Marrison, Geoffrey Edward (1975), "The Early Cham language and its relation to Malay", Journal of the Malaysian Branch of the Royal Asiatic Society, 48 (2 (228)): 52–59, JSTOR 41492110
- Arkib Negara Malaysia (2014), Persada Kegemilangan Bahasa Melayu (Malay language at the glorious stage)
- O'Reilly, Dougald J.W. (2006), Early Civilizations of Southeast Asia, AltaMira Press, ISBN 978-0-7591-0278-1
- Thurgood, Graham (1999), From Ancient Cham to Modern Dialects: Two Thousand Years of Language Contact and Change, University of Hawaii press, ISBN 978-082-4831-89-9
