= Phạm Văn =

King of Champa

Fan Wen (Vietnamese: Phạm Văn, Chinese: 范文) was the King of Champa from 336 to 349. Fan Wen was the commander in chief to Fan Yi, and, after Fan Yi's death in 336, he seized the throne. In 340, he sent an embassy to Eastern Jin dynasty of China to request the province of Jiaozhi. His request was denied, and so Fan Wen recaptured Rinan in 347. He died two years later on another campaign.

Fan Wen has been described as an ethnic Chinese sold into slavery as a child to a barbarian chieftain. Legend states he caught two carp while tending goats, and hid them from his master. He was surprised to see them turned into two stones, one of which had iron in it. He forged two sabres and prayed, "If I split this rock when I hit it, let the divine virtue embodied in it make me a king." At fifteen, he fled and sought refuge with a Cham merchant, traveling to Western Jin dynasty of China in 315, before settling in Champa. He then entered the employ of Fan Yi, using his knowledge of martial art and city fortifications. He used the trust he gained to alienate Fan Yi from his children.

Preceded by Fan Yi 284–336	King of Champa; 336–349	Succeeded by Fan Fo 349–380
