= Phạm Dật =

Fan Tat (范逸) also known as Phạm Dat or Fan Yi was the King of Champa, then known as Lin-yi, from 284 to 336. In 284, the King sent the first Cham envoy to the Chinese Emperor's Court. He died in 336, and was succeeded by his commander in chief. Fan came to the throne after a protracted campaign led by his predecessor Fan Hsiung who led attacks on the Chinese province of Jiaozhi.

The son of Fan Hiong, Fan Yi employed Fan Wen, a Chinese knowledgeable in the martial arts, including city fortifications.

Preceded by Fan Hsiung c. 270–280	King of Champa; 284–336	Succeeded by Fan Wen 336–349
