= Bhadravarman I =

- King of Lâm Ấp; Dharma-Maharaja
- Reign: 380–413
- Predecessor: Phạm Phật
- Successor: Gangaraja (Phạm Địch Chớn)
- Died: 413

Bhadravarman or Phạm Hồ Đạt (Chinese: 范胡达; pinyin: Fànhúdá; Vietnamese: Phạm Hồ Đạt, Middle Chinese: buam’-ɣɔ-dɑt, Sanskrit Bhadravarman, literally "Blessed armour" but also meaning the Jasminum sambac flower), was the king of Champa from 380 to 413. In 380, Bhadravarman, the son or grandson of Fan Fo, took the throne with the regal name Dharmamahārāja Śrī Bhadravarman I, "Great King of the Law Bhadravarman".

He is the first Champa king to have varman suffixed to his name. The use of the honorific title varman, very common amongst the Pallava dynasty kings, was borrowed by the kings of Cambodia. Also the same year, the King moved the capital to Simhapura in Quảng Nam Province. He built temples and palaces, all facing north, at Mỹ Sơn and Trà Kiệu. Significantly, Bhadravarman was a renowned scholar, well-versed in all four Vedas and the author of several inscriptions in Sanskrit. He invited learned Brahmins from India to settle in his kingdom.

In 399, Bhadravarman went on a military campaign up north and succeeded in capturing the Vietnamese provinces of Rinan and Jiuzhen (Vietnamese: Cửu Chân). He continued on his temple-building campaign as well, building Cham towers along the coast up north. From 405 to 413, he continuously battled the Chinese governor Du Xue. However, at their last confrontation, Bhadravarman disappeared without a trace after he was defeated by the governor.

Two of his sons, Chen Chen and Na Neng were killed in 413, while another son, Ti Kai, fled with his mother. Bhadravarman's son, Ti Chen, Gangaraja, abdicated the throne and left for India. The kingdom then transitioned into civil war.

Preceded by Fan Fo 349–380	King of Champa; 380–413	Succeeded by Gangaraja
