= Phạm Phật =

- King of Lâm Ấp
- Reign: 349–380
- Predecessor: Phạm Văn
- Successor: Bhadravarman I
- Died: 380

Phạm Phật (Chinese: 范佛 pinyin: Fàn Fó, Vietnamese: Phạm Phật) was the king of Champa from 349 to 380, and the son of Fan Wen.

In 353, the King was defeated by the Jin governor of Jiaozhi. The governor also recaptured Rinan, which had been captured by Fan Fo's predecessor, Fan Wen.

Preceded by Fan Wen 336–349	King of Champa; 349–380	Succeeded by Fan Hu Ta 380–413
