= Duy Xuyên district =

Coordinates: 15.800°N 108.167°E

Duy Xuyên district Huyện Duy Xuyên
- District
- Interactive map of Duy Xuyên district
- Country: Vietnam
- Region: South Central Coast
- Province: Quảng Nam
- Capital: Nam Phước

Area
  - Total: 115 sq mi (298 km^{2})

Population (2003)
  - Total: 183,060
- Time zone: UTC+7 (Indochina Time)

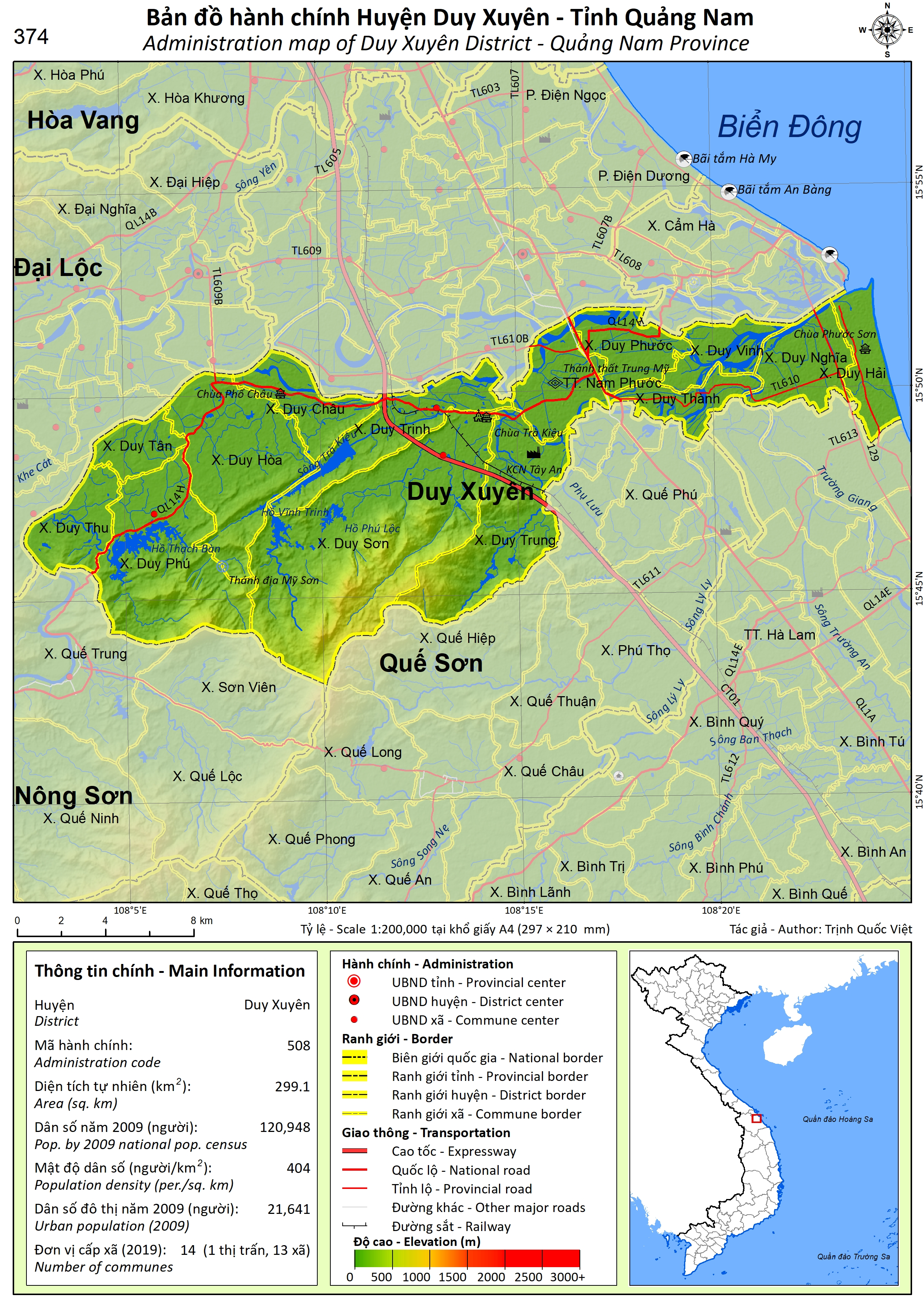
Administration map of Duy Xuyên district

Duy Xuyên is a former district (huyện) of Quảng Nam province in the South Central Coast region of Vietnam. As of 2003 the district had a population of 129,616. The district covers an area of 298 km^{2}. The district capital lies at Nam Phước.
