= Trà Kiệu =

Village in Da Nang, Vietnam

Coordinates: 15°49′18″N 108°13′55″E

Trà Kiệu is a village in Duy Xuyên commune, Da Nang city, Vietnam.

== Geography ==
Trà Kiệu is located in the Thu Bồn river valley 18 kilometres (11 mi) inland west of Hội An (halfway between Hội An and My Son Sanctuary), which has since moved putting the site on the southern bank of the Bà Rén river, a tributary of the Thu Bồn river.

== History ==
Trà Kiệu was the first capital city of the Hindu Champa Kingdom, then named Simhapura, from the 4th century to the 8th century CE. The site has been known to the western world since the late 19th century. Today nothing remains of the ancient city except the rectangular ramparts. Bửu Châu or jade hill overlooks the site and is known as the citadel of the Simhapura. There are also signs of a border wall for the ancient city, though it is currently unknown if this was for defense, hierarchical segregation, irrigation, or something else entirely. There has been much debate regarding Trà Kiệu, as it is believed by some to be the capital city of Champa Kingdom and by others to be the capital city of the Kingdom of Lâm Ấp (Linyi). Trà Kiệu also has two main ceramic phases: the first consists of basic ceramics for household use and roof tiles marked with textile impressions. The second phase brings about the iconic roof tiles with faces on them. There are two main theories about why the faces start appearing on the tiles: the first is that Hinduism had such a strong influence that workers at Trà Kiệu began carving faces into roof tiles. The second theory is that there was an Indian mask maker who introduced and popularized the face motifs as this style of decoration on roof tiles.

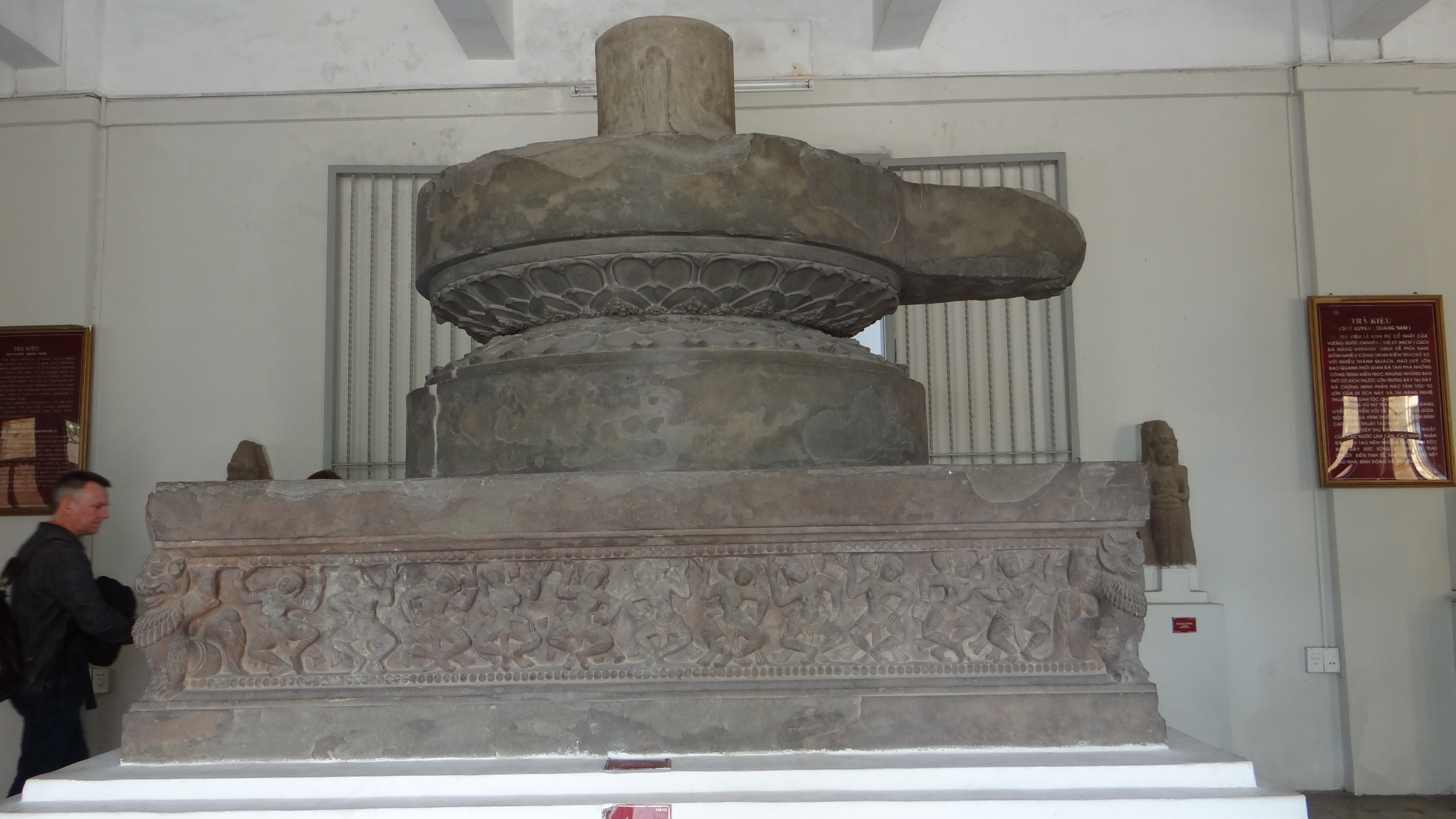
The Trà Kiệu pedestal of the 10th century supports a massive lingam and ablutionary cistern.

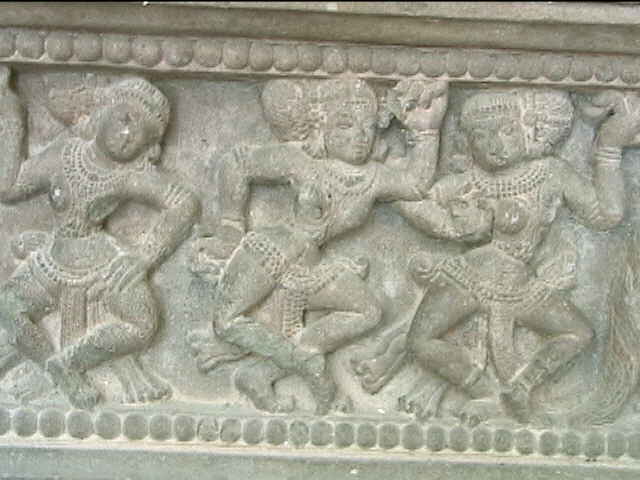
A row of apsaras, or celestial nymphs, is depicted on the base of the Trà Kiệu Pedestal.

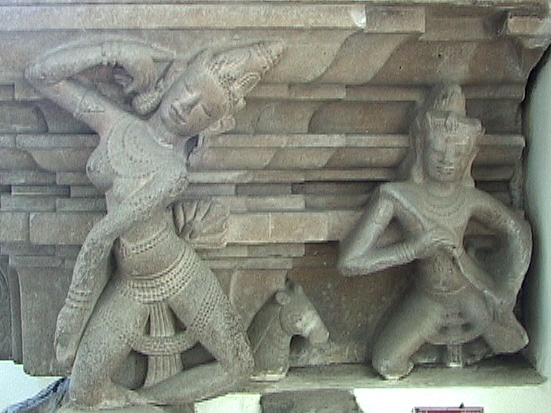
The Dancers' Pedestal of Trà Kiệu features this apsara or dancer and gandharva or musician.

=== Champa theory ===
Occupation of the Trà Kiệu site began in the 1st-2nd century, while Cham influence at the site didn't begin until the mid to late 4th century. The city of Simhapura, now known as Trà Kiệu, had its perimeter walls built in the early centuries of the Common Era which support the above statements. While Champa influence began traveling out of India and into South-Eastern Asia in the 4th century, Simhapura isn't believed to have become the capital of the Champa Kingdom until the 10th century AD. Further mentions of Simhapura dating from the 11th century (1074–1076) when king Harivarman IV decided to restore the city back to its golden age. Evidence of Cham influence in Trà Kiệu are sketches from Claeys that show the district foundations on which Cham built their towers. There's evidence of bricks both broken and intricately laid that denote the Cham's influence in Trà Kiệu. Additionally, the border wall was made of brick which tells us that Trà Kiệu had enough Cham influence to fashion their border walls after the Cham style. There was additionally a lot of Cham style pottery found at Trà Kiệu, and while this is not definitive evidence there was enough pottery to make it highly significant. Ultimately, while there is no absolute proof of the Champa Theory, there is significant evidence of Chinese influence as well. However, the Cham influence is undeniable and many Vietnamese Archeologists conclude that Simhapura now known as Trà Kiệu was the capital of the Champa Kingdom.

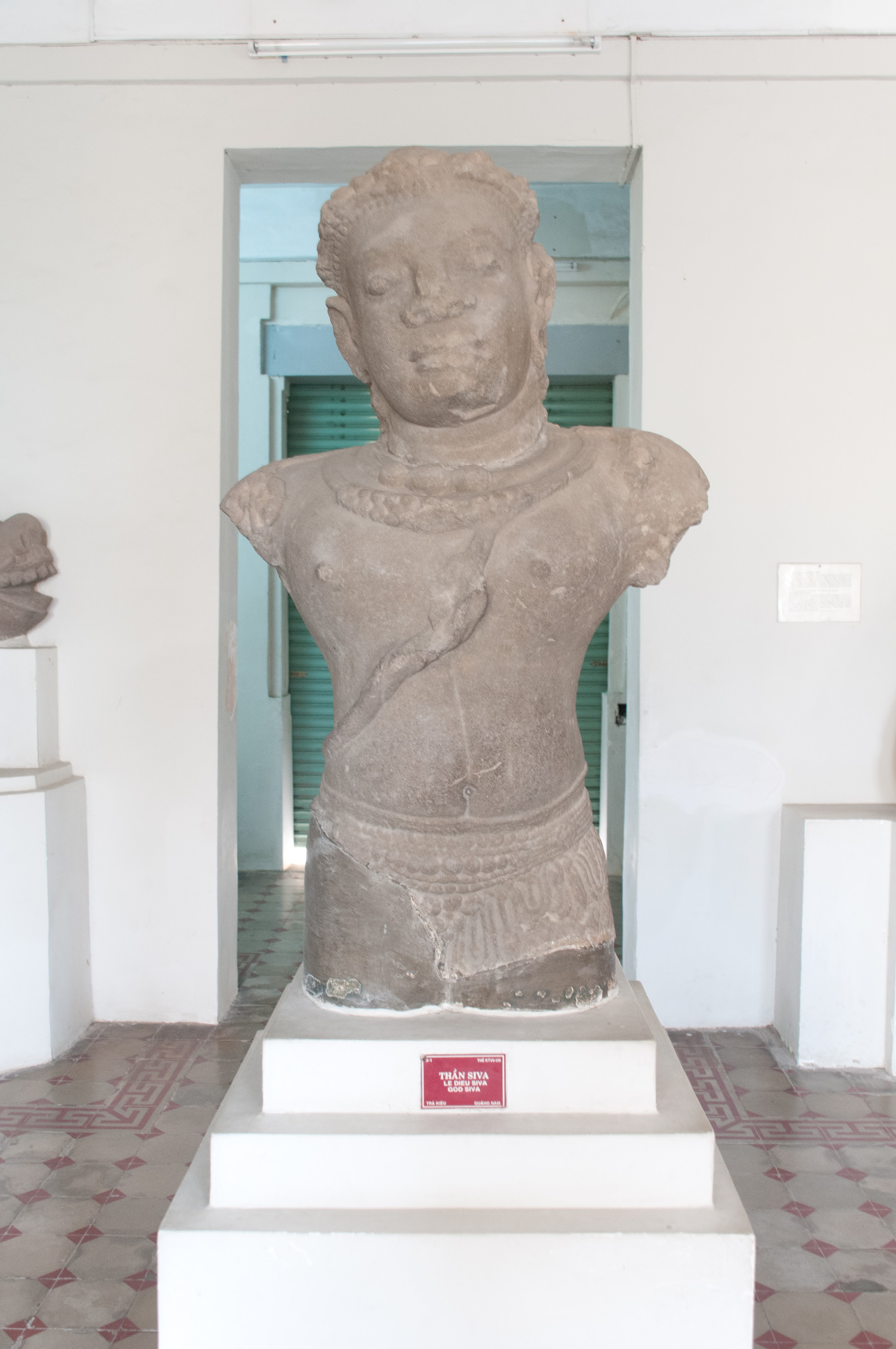
Stone sculpture of the god Siva on a pedestal and on display at the Museum of Cham Sculpture (Da Nang). The presence of Siva gives some credence to the Champa theory

=== Lin Yi theory ===
This theory is proposed by Leonard Aurousseau, who sent out the original documenter of Trà Kiệu, J.-Y. Claeys. Claeys conducted flyovers of Trà Kiệu in 1927 and his research went on to undermine Aurousseau, who thought Trà Kiệu was the capital of the Lin Yi empire that enveloped parts of Vietnam. This deviates even from the later developed "Champa theory" explained above because Aurousseau believed Trà Kiệu to be the city that was invaded by China in the 5th century. This theory was based on the ancient Chinese records of the invasion and was a shot in the dark as the precise location of Lin Yi has remained uncertain. It was unclear from said Chinese records if Lin Yi referred to a Kingdom or a City.

Another scholar, Andrew David Hardy, theorizes the name Lin Yi may have been used by the Chinese as a catch-all for a hostile Vietnamese polity. According to Hardy, Lin Yi was located north of Cham territory and was likely not a Cham settlement and was instead later absorbed into the Champa polity as it expanded north. He further theorizes that the Chinese simply extended the name Lin Yi to the Champa Thu Bồn valley. As with Aurousseau's theory, Hardy bases this hypothesis on speculation and on documentation of China's interactions with the Champa, as well as an elusive Vietnamese polity.

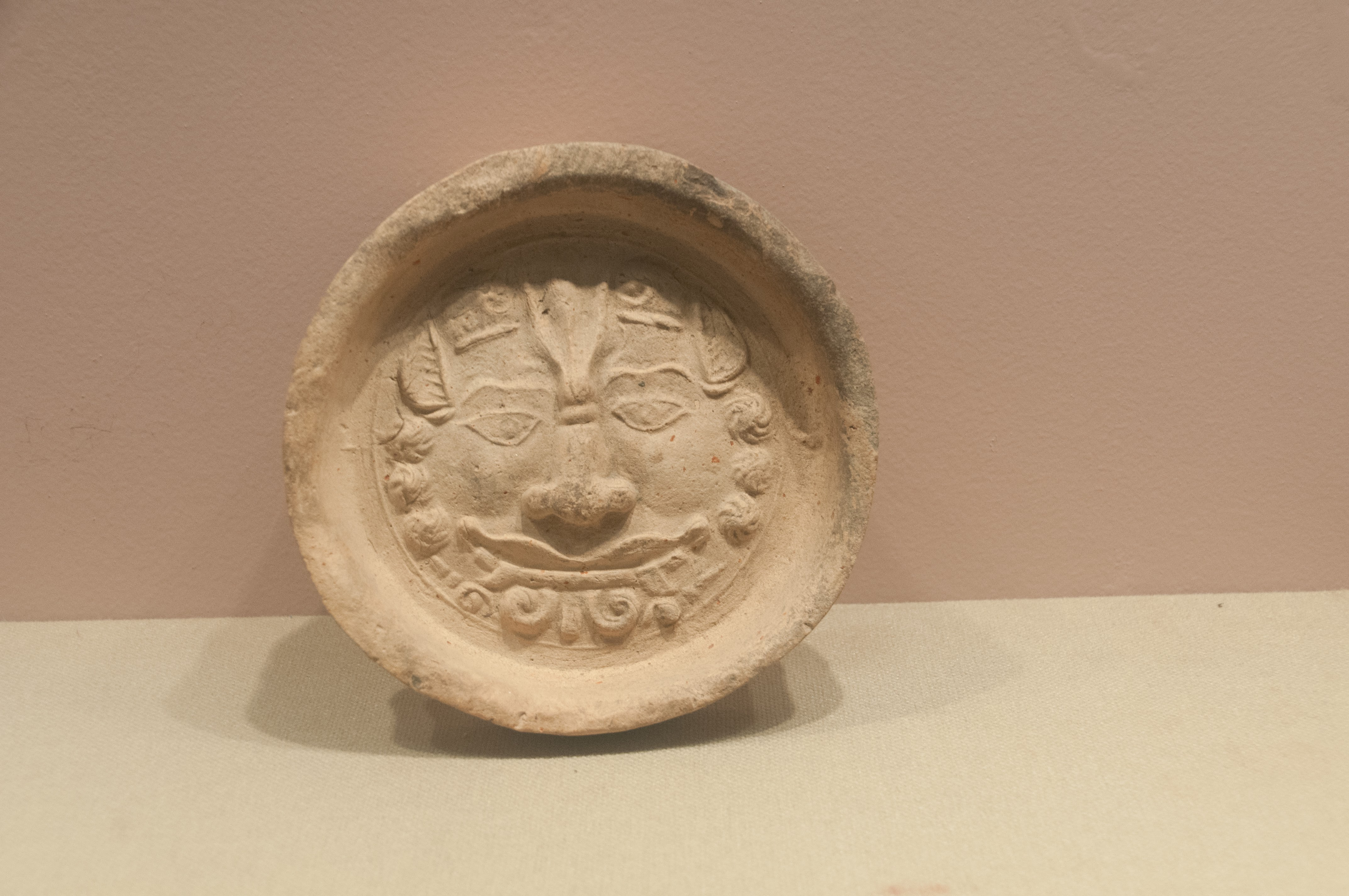
Ceramic end tile with decoration from Trà Kiệu. Example of roof tiles with face motif.

=== Chronology ===
There are two main phases in the chronology of Trà Kiệu, which are as follows: Trà Kiệu I Phase (which can be further subdivided into Ia and Ib) and Trà Kiệu II Phase. The largest difference between Trà Kiệu I and II Phase lie in the styles of roof tiles found at the site. Trà Kiệu I Phase is represented by the presence of roof tiles with textile impressions, while Trà Kiệu II Phase roof tiles lack impressions. Roof tiles from Trà Kiệu II Phase are instead decorated with motifs of human faces. A further breakdown of the chronology of Trà Kiệu from researcher Trường Giang Đỗ is as follows:

- Trà Kiệu I Phase
  - A range of pottery of coarse fabric, including:
  - Ovoid jars, cord-marked jars, lids, dishes, bowls, pedestal cups and stoves and roof tiles
- Trà Kiệu I Phase Ia
  - Roof tiles marked with textile impressions
- Trà Kiệu II Phase
  - No roof tiles with textile impressions on concave surface, instead decorated with human faces
  - Eaves tiles with human face motifs can be dated from the third century CE, likely from the second quarter and onwards

=== Origins of face motifs ===
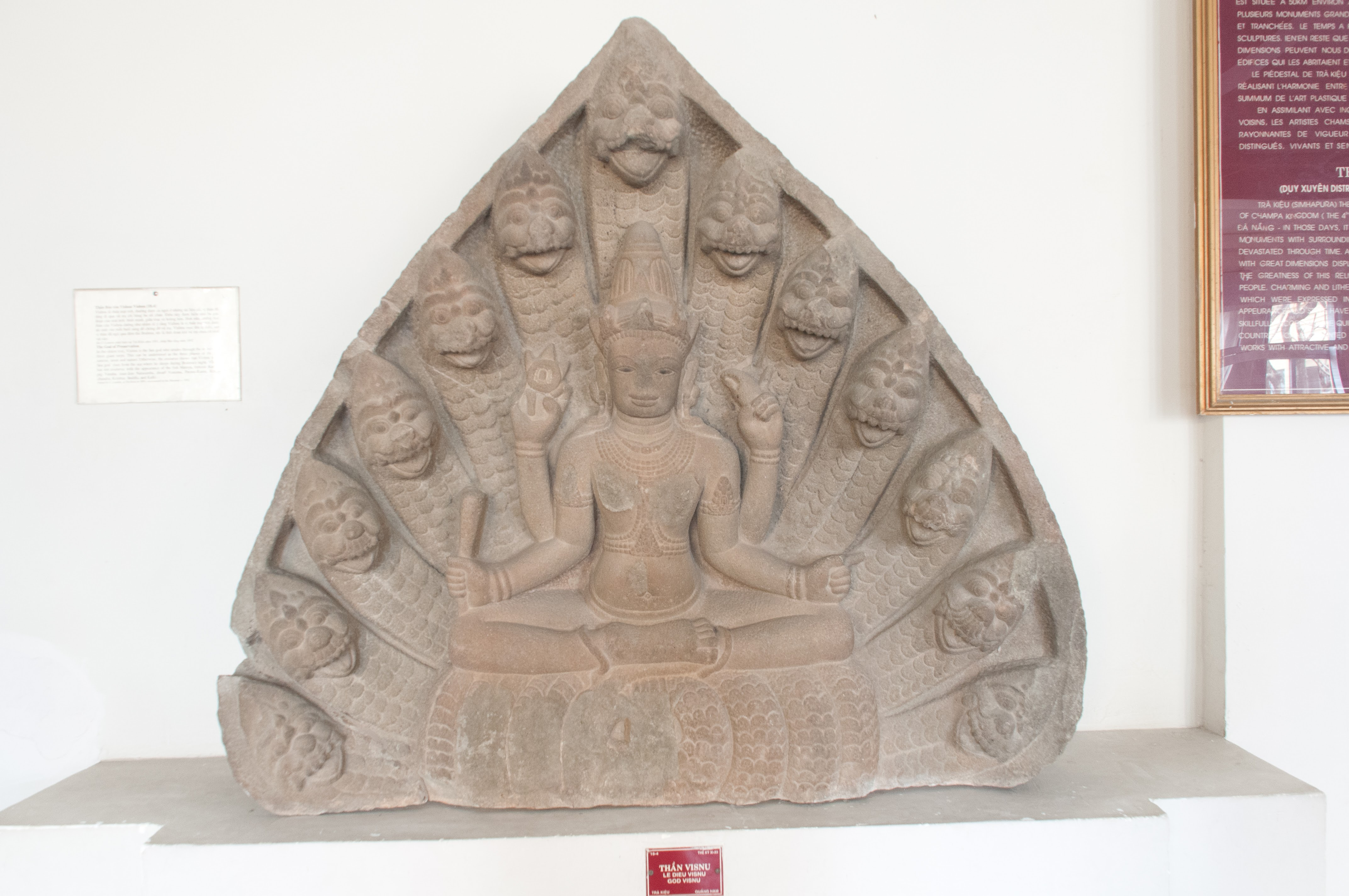
Stone image of the god Visnu on display at the Museum of Cham Sculpture. (Da Nang) This Visnu gives further evidence to the Hindu face motif theory.

The leading theory on the origins of the face motifs on roof tiles from Trà Kiệu comes from Japanese researcher Nishimura Masanari, who studied roof tiles excavated from the site of Lũng Khê in Thuận Thành district, Bắc Ninh province, and compared them to roof tiles excavated from Nanjing, China. Roof tiles from these locations include face motifs similar to those found at Trà Kiệu. The main difference in the styles of these tiles is that those excavated from Lũng Khê also feature lotus motifs, which are not seen in Trà Kiệu. Dr. Nishimura attributes this difference in motif styles to religious and ideological differences, mainly that of Hinduism (face motif) and Buddhism (lotus motif). His theory states that the spread of Buddhism did not have as much as an impact at Trà Kiệu as it did at Lũng Khê, and that Trà Kiệu may have had more Hindu influence. An additional theory of Indian influence is the possibility that the face motif roof tiles at Trà Kiệu may have been introduced and popularized by an Indian mask maker.

=== 19th century ===
In 1885, Catholic residents defeated a siege of the village by the Cần Vương movement, crediting a Marian apparition for their survival. In 1898, a shrine to Our Lady of Trà Kiệu was built on Bửu Châu hill. An annual religious festival has taken place there since 1971.

== Transportation ==
The village is served by the Trà Kiệu station of the North–South railway.

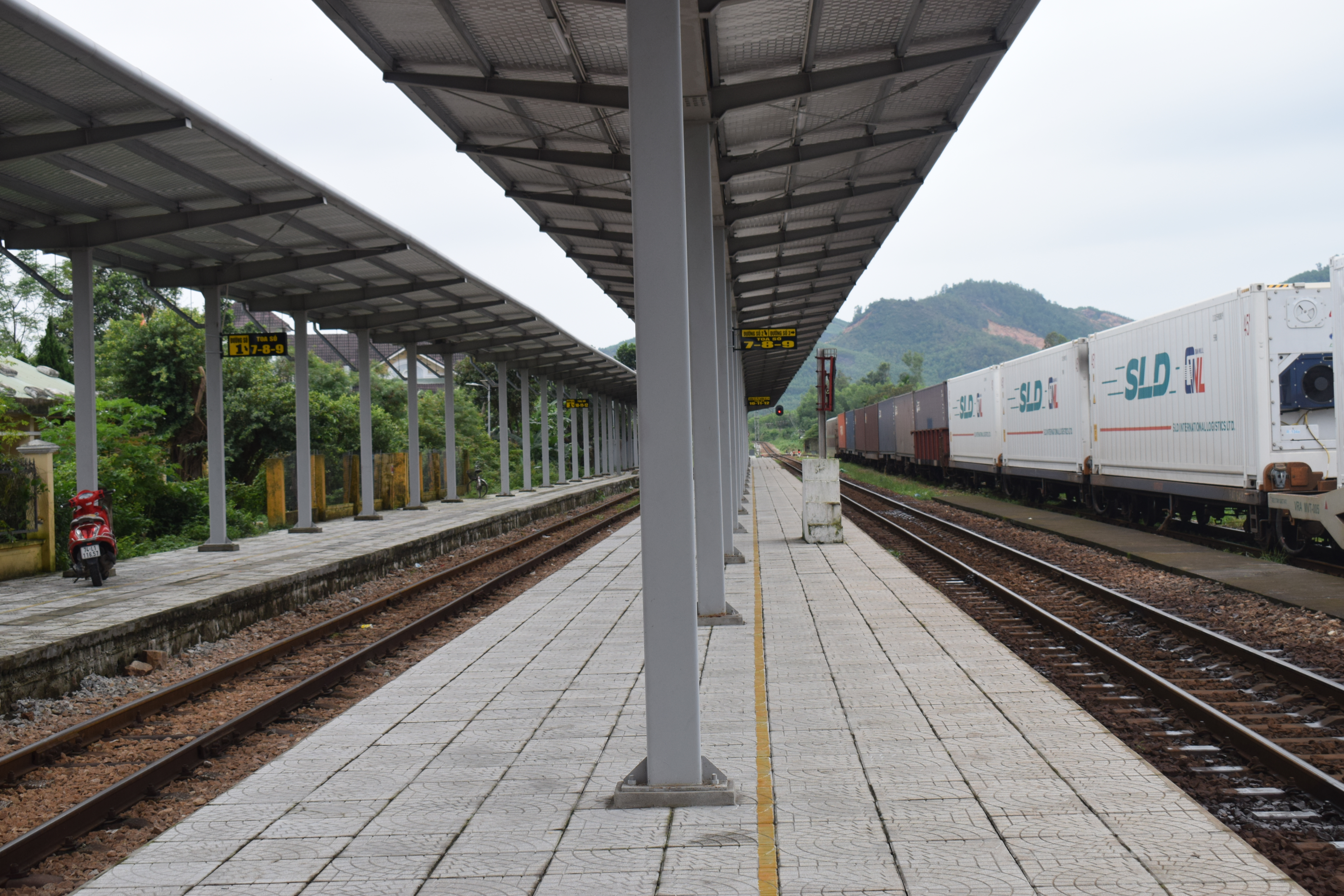
Trà Kiệu Railway Station

== See also ==
- Art of Champa—Trà Kiệu Style
- Đông Yên Châu inscription
