= Thu Bồn River =

River in Vietnam

Thu Bồn
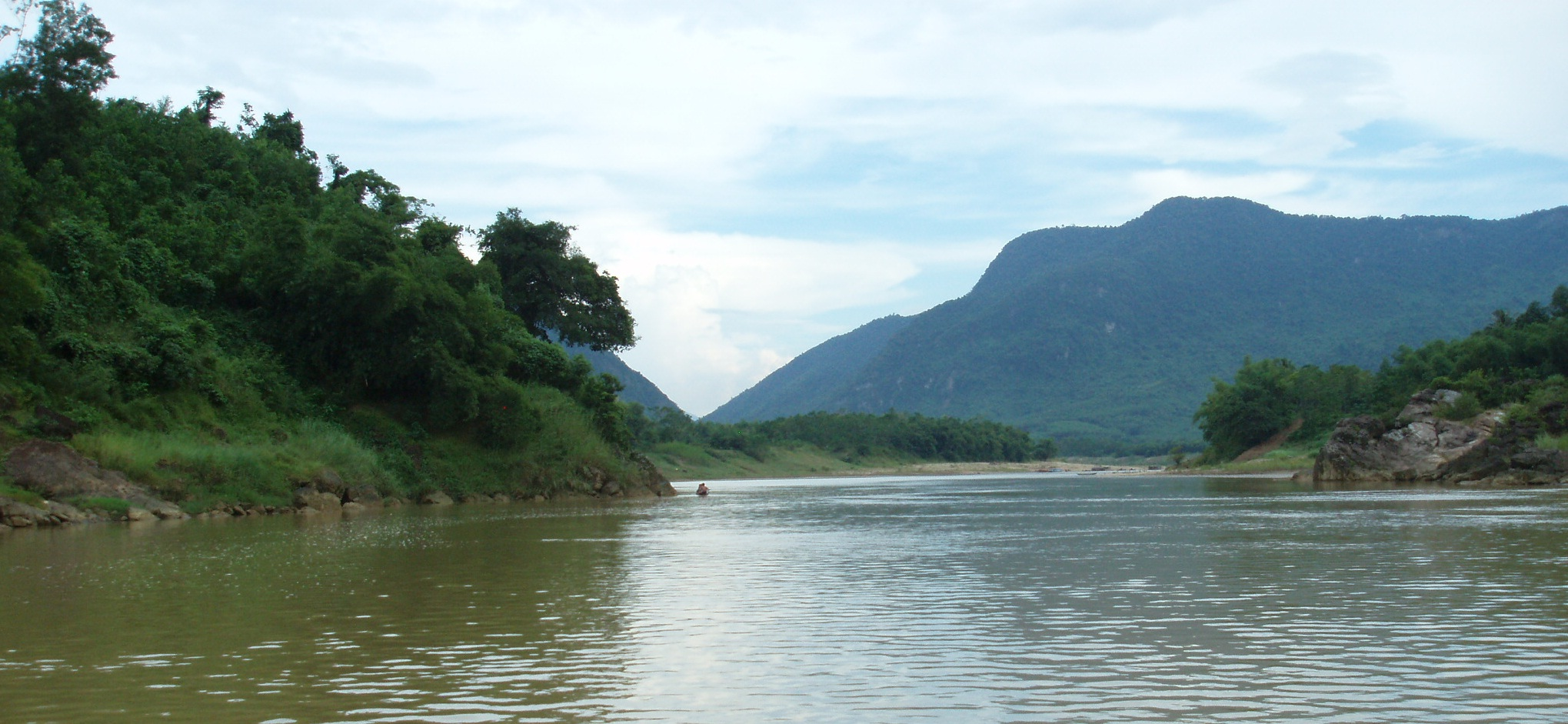
- Upstream of Thu Bồn river

Location
- Country: Vietnam
- Municipality: Da Nang

Physical characteristics
- Source: Confluence of Tranh and Tiên
  - location: boundary of Việt An and Hiệp Đức communes
  - coordinates: 15°34′11″N 108°07′09″E
- Mouth: South China Sea
  - location: boundary of Duy Nghĩa commune and Hội An Đông ward
  - coordinates: 15°52′30″N 108°23′41″E
- Discharge
  - location: mouth
  - average: 611 cubic metres per second (21,600 cu ft/s)

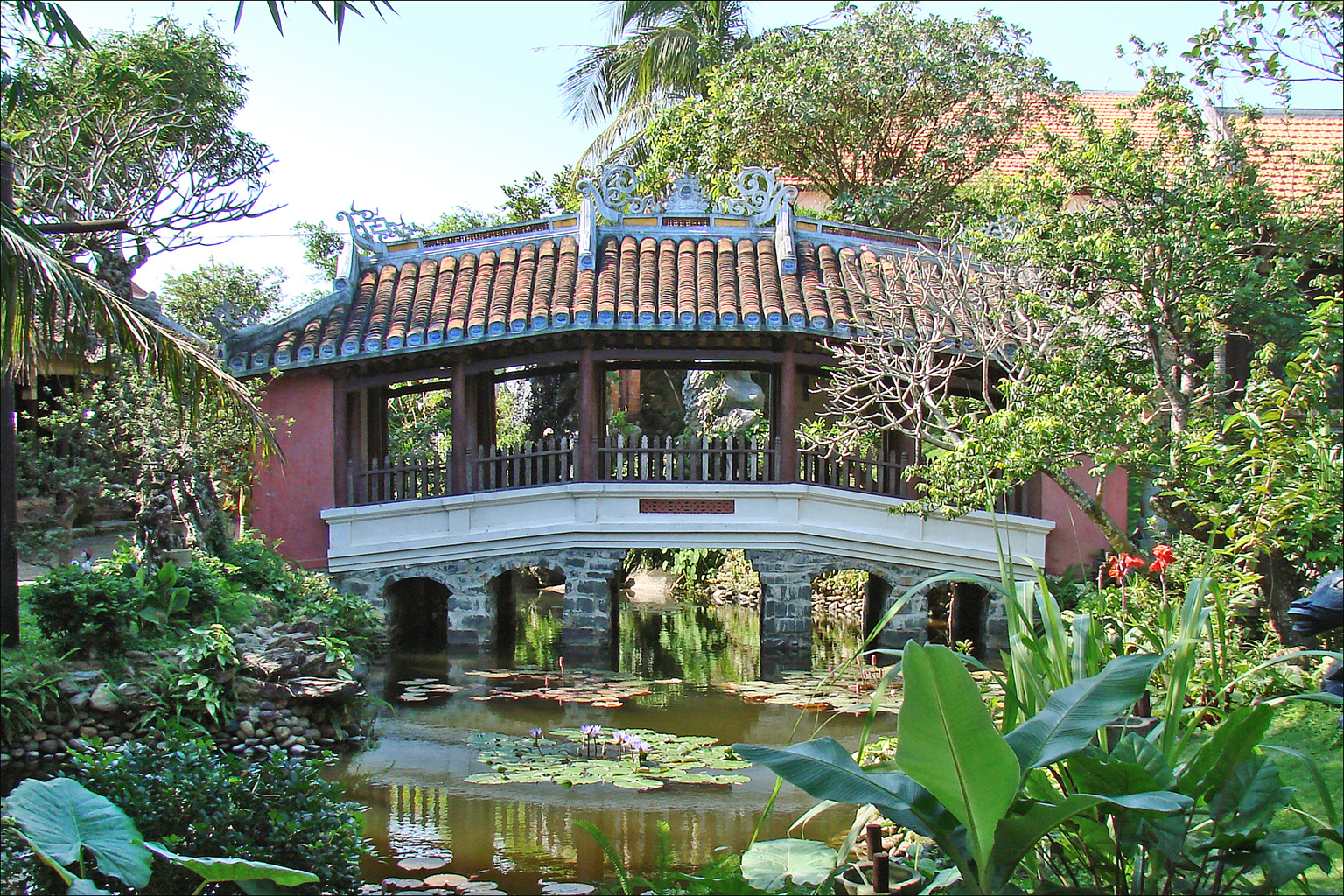
A bridge spanning a branch of the Thu Bồn River in Hội An

The Thu Bồn River (Vietnamese: sông Thu Bồn) is a river in central Vietnam, located in the municipality of Da Nang. It is formed by the confluence of the Tranh and Tiên Rivers on the boundary of Việt An and Hiệp Đức communes. It flows through several parts of the Da Nang municipality, among others the town of Hội An, before emptying into the South China Sea on the boundary of Duy Nghĩa commune and Hội An Đông ward.

The Thu Bồn valley was a centre of Champa culture from 700 until the Vietnamese conquest in 1471. A Cham port used to be located at cửa Đại, the mouth of the river. Today boat trips from Hội An up river to Mỹ Sơn are a tourist attraction.
