= Daughter of Kandarpadharma =

Queen regnant of Champa
- Reign: ?–653
- Predecessor: Bhadresvaravarman
- Successor: Vikrantavarman I

Queen consort of Champa
- Tenure: 653–?
- Spouse: Vikrantavarman I
- Dynasty: Simhapura dynasty
- Father: Kandarpadharma

The daughter of Kandarpadharma (fl. 653), whose name is unknown, was the queen regnant of Champa in ?–653.

She was the daughter of king Kandarpadharma, and the sister of king Prabhasadharma.

Prabhasadharma originally succeeded to the throne after the death of his father Kandarpadharma. However, in 645 one of the king's ministers killed both the king and all males of the royal family in favor of the king's nephew Bhadresvaravarman. This left no males to reign, therefore the throne went to Bhadresvaravarman's aunt when Bhadresvaravarman was deposed by ministers.

According to New Book of Tang, when Bhadresvaravarman was deposed, the daughter of Kandarpadharma became queen regnant by ministers of Champa. However, the female monarch could not stabilize the country. So the ministers brought Vikrantavarman I to Champa and made him new king. When Vikrantavarman I ascended the throne of Champa, she went from queen regnant to his queen consort.

In New Book of Tang, her name is unknown, and she is just called the daughter of Kandarpadharma.

A suggested name for her was Isanavarman.

Preceded by Bhadresvaravarman 645–?	Queen regnant of Champa ?–653	Succeeded by Vikrantavarman I 653–686
