= Culture of Champa =

Culture of place in present-day Vietnam

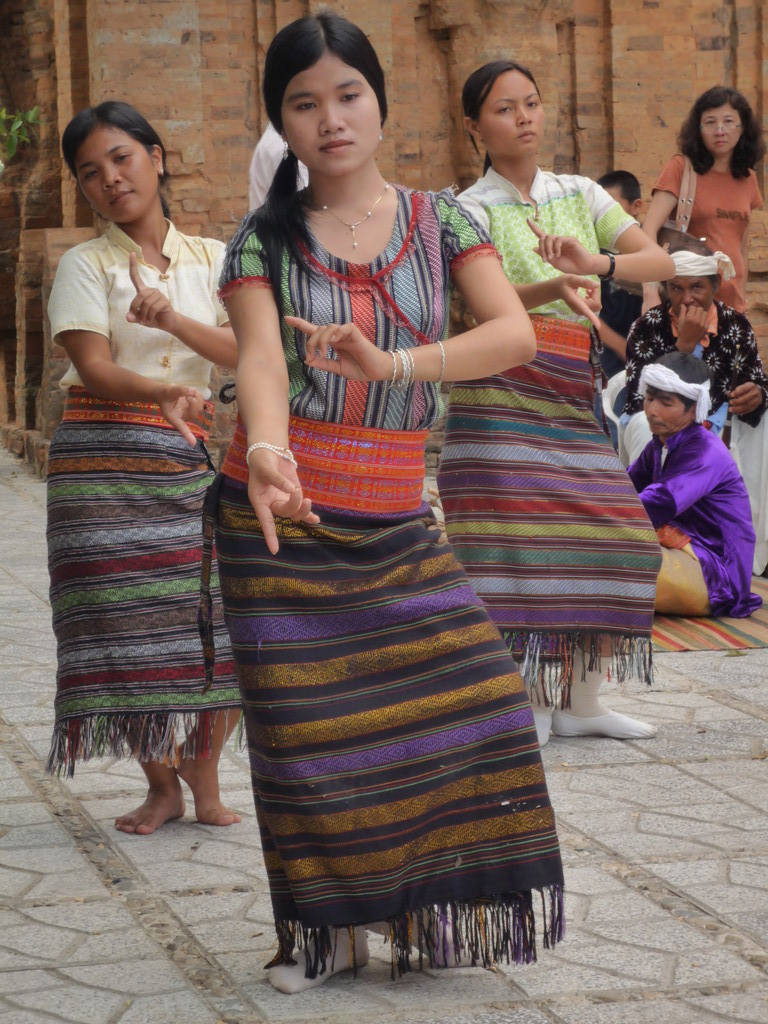
Modern Chams, descendants of the ancient population of Champa

The culture of Champa, a medieval kingdom in what is now central and southern Vietnam, was largely shaped by Indian culture, that integrated pre-existing local customs and traditions. The daily life of the ancient Chams was oriented toward the sea, significantly influencing the lifestyle and culture of the inhabitants of coastal valleys. Additionally, Indian religions —primarily Hinduism and to a lesser extent Buddhism— played a significant role in Cham life, incorporating deities from local cults and beliefs into their extensive pantheon.

Its population was relatively homogeneous, with the ancient Chams being the dominant ethnic group. Only on the peripheries of their state did the Chams interact and partially intermix with their neighbors—Vietnamese to the north, Khmers to the south, and highland tribes to the west. (Note: Additionally, in major Cham ports such as Hoi An, Chinese merchant quarters had long existed.) Settling the coastal regions of central Vietnam in the early centuries CE, by the 5th century, the Chams were heavily influenced by Indian civilization, adopting Hinduism and Indian scripts. The so-called "March to the South" Nam tiến —a gradual colonization of Cham lands by the Vietnamese, beginning in the 11th century— had an important significance for the subsequent history of the Chams.

In the 1471 Champa–Đại Việt War, the Vietnamese sacked the Cham capital of Vijaya and conquered most of the country. Only the two southern Cham kingdoms, Kauthara and Panduranga, retained some autonomy. Despite losing their main ethnic territory and a partial shift from Hinduism to Islam, the Chams largely preserved their national identity and sense of belonging to their once-brilliant ancestral culture. Few Cham inscriptions that have survived provide details about the daily life, culture, and customs of ordinary Chams; most information pertains to ruling dynasties and religious matters.

== Sources ==
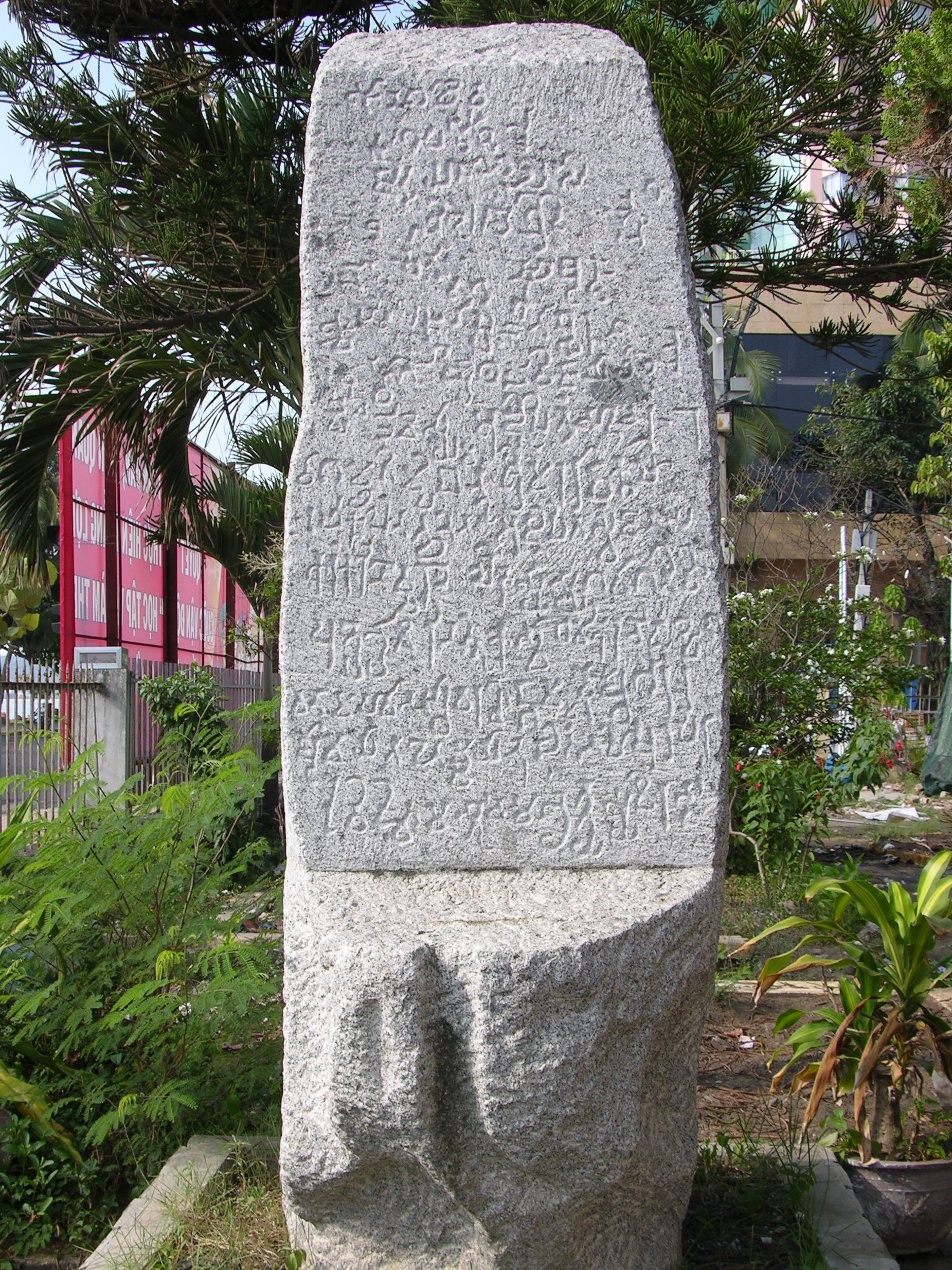
A replica of a Cham stele with an inscription in Sanskrit

The primary sources of information about Cham society include:

- archaeological sites;
- inscriptions in Sanskrit and the ancient Cham language;
- Chinese and Vietnamese annals.

Brick and stone structures, as well as various sculptures, ceramics, and metal artifacts found during archaeological excavations, are often difficult to date precisely. Additionally, it is frequently impossible to attribute a particular object or structure to a specific style by which art historians classify Champa's art.

Many ancient inscriptions have not survived due to wars that ravaged Champa's territory in antiquity, as well as in modern and recent times. The discovery and publication of the main body of ancient Cham inscriptions occurred in the 19th and early 20th centuries. Texts in Sanskrit constitute about one-third of the known corpus today, but their translations require verification based on more recent archaeological findings.

Texts in the ancient Cham language, due to their complexity, are poorly studied and published far less frequently than Sanskrit texts. The ancient Cham language is now considered a dead language. It contains many Sanskrit words with lost meanings, and its syntax and lexicon significantly differ from the modern spoken Cham language. Moreover, the script has changed so much that modern Chams can no longer understand ancient inscriptions. A common issue with Champa's written sources (both in Sanskrit and Cham) is that they provide only an "official" version of the country's history, written from the perspective of the Cham elite (kings, clergy, and high-ranking officials), almost entirely ignoring the lives of ordinary people.

Various Chinese and Vietnamese historical chronicles are external sources and are not always objective. They report on relations between states (Champa and China, Champa and Dai Viet, Champa and southern neighbors), reflecting the centralized empires' perceptions of the fragmented state that Champa was, often distorted by their own biases. In areas such as geography, history, or ethnography, Chinese and Vietnamese sources possess a significant degree of objectivity; however, in analyzing Champa's political system, they are not free from prejudice. The Chams, for their part, did not record their views of the Vietnamese or Chinese socio-political systems in writing, preferring other genres of literature.

== Ethnogenesis and settlement ==
The Chams, an Austronesian people, settled central Vietnam's coastal valleys in the early centuries CE, establishing multiple kingdoms. Likely originating from the Malay Archipelago, possibly northwest Borneo, their language is related to Malay and Acehnese with Sanskrit influences. They succeeded the Sa Huynh culture, though its impact on Cham ethnogenesis is unclear. The Chams displaced and assimilated indigenous Mon-Khmer tribes, influencing groups like the Raglay, Churu, Jarai, Ede, and Mnong, now known as mountain Chams and Thương.

Their territory spanned from the Red River Delta to the Mekong Delta, bordered by the Annamite Mountains. They populated the Linyi principality and were significant in the Khmer Funan kingdom. New Austronesian settlers from Sumatra, Java, Borneo, and beyond assimilated rapidly. (Note: In 1318, a Cham king, Che Nang, fled to Java after defeat by the Vietnamese.) The first Cham state emerged around Sinhapura, Linyi's capital (modern Quang Binh–Quang Nam). By 875, with the Indrapura dynasty, Champa's center shifted to Indrapura, later Kauthara, Panduranga, and Vijaya, covering Quang Binh to Ninh Thuan. (Note: Chinese chronicles called Champa Zhancheng ("Divine City").)

Since the 11th century, the Vietnamese March to the South colonized northern Cham lands. The Khmers briefly conquered Champa in 1145 and 1190, influencing its culture. Champa prospered in the 14th century, capturing Thang Long, but Vietnamese conquest resumed, and in the Champa–Đại Việt War they captured and sacked Vijaya in 1471. Only Kauthara and Panduranga remained semi-autonomous, adopting Islam via the Malacca Sultanate. By 1499, Vietnamese decrees banned Cham intermarriage and, in 1509, massacred Cham communities.

Around 1025, the Vietnamese initiated the March to the South, a prolonged colonization of Cham lands through military and diplomatic means. Starting in Nghe An (1036), they annexed Cham territories by 1069, reaching Hai Van Pass by the 12th century. The Chams briefly recaptured areas in 1103. In the 14th century, King Jaya Simhavarman III ceded lands via marriage, sparking conflicts. By 1402, further Cham territories were lost. The Fourth Era of Northern Domination (1407–1428) paused expansion, but by 1433, assimilated Chams in Quang Nam supported the Vietnamese. In 1471, Vijaya's fall led to Cham assimilation, with survivors relocating to Kauthara and Panduranga.

Champa was an urban civilization with fortified cities at river mouths, facilitating trade and defense. Major cities included Vishnupura, Sinhapura, Indrapura, Vijaya, Kauthara, Panduranga, Virapura, and Rajapura. These served as clan centers supporting or vying for power. The capital, called Champapura, shifted with dynasties until Vijaya became permanent from the 12th to 15th centuries.

== Social hierarchy ==
Although Champa's political model was largely borrowed from India, the social system retained numerous distinctions. Cham society did not follow the caste system in its Indian form; in Champa, Brahmins were not placed above kings, and secular and spiritual authorities were closely intertwined.

According to Cham inscriptions, at the top of the social hierarchy were Brahmins (the priestly class) and Kshatriyas (kings and princes of individual Cham clans). Among the priesthood, the royal Brahmin (purohita), a close advisor to the monarch, and selected Brahmins who compiled royal genealogies stood out. All Brahmins were under special protection, their lives valued above others. A marriage between a woman from the kshatriya varna and a Brahmin significantly elevated the bride's family status, though inscriptions do not mention marriages of Brahmin women with kshatriyas. The status of a Brahmin in Champa was not higher than that of a king, but an alliance with a Brahmin family was highly prestigious. Thus, unlike in India, Champa's hierarchical system allowed marriages between Brahmins and women from royal families.

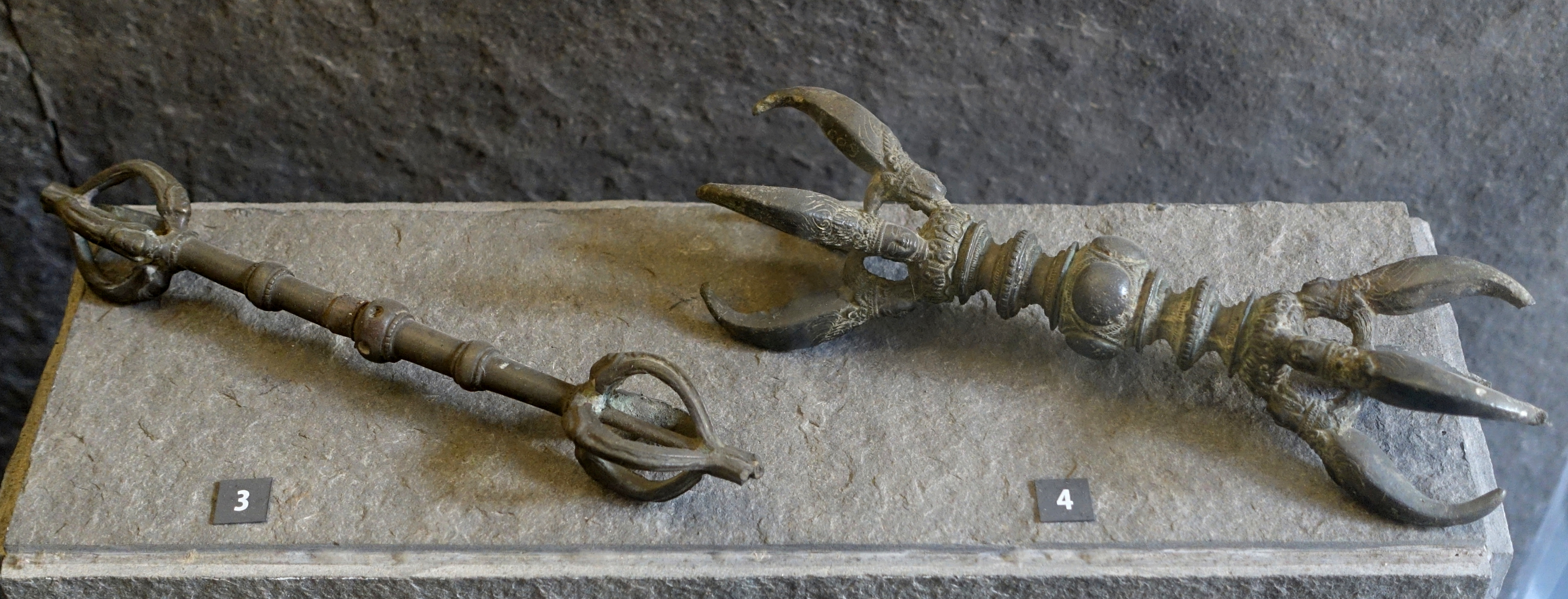
Bronze vajra. 10th–13th century. Museum of Vietnamese History in Ho Chi Minh City

Among kshatriyas and lower classes, the king held unquestioned authority, embodying the image of a god on earth (most often Shiva, sometimes Indra). Champa's social hierarchy was predominantly hereditary. Both positions within the royal family and ranks or offices among court officials were inherited. These hierarchies often overlapped, as many high-ranking officials belonged to the royal family or were related to influential priestly families.

Cham inscriptions provide little information about commoners, so modern historians know little about free peasants or artisans. However, inscriptions mention temple slaves, including both prisoners of war and villagers serving at temples. Nevertheless, a specific locality was crucial for a claimant to royal power, as they had to reference their connection to the ruling dynasty by mentioning their origin from a particular village (grama) or city (pura). Mentioning one's birthplace indicated native roots, legitimizing claims to authority. Additionally, performing funeral rites for immediate ancestors or mythical clan founders tied an individual to a specific place. Every Cham was primarily identified through their geographical connection ("so-and-so from such-and-such village") and only secondarily through kinship ("so-and-so, son of so-and-so").

In addition to temple slavery, debt slavery existed in Champa. Any poor person unable to support their family could sell a family member or themselves into slavery to settle debts. Another category of slaves included criminals sentenced to hard labor for the state. However, the most numerous group of slaves remained prisoners of war, enslaved during frequent raids on neighboring countries (Vietnamese, Khmers, Lao, and highlanders).

== Daily culture ==
The ancient Chams lived in isolated coastal valleys and were oriented toward the sea, renowned as skilled navigators, traders, and fishermen. They also interacted with their Western and Southern neighbors, sending trade caravans through mountain passes to the lands of the Lao, Khmers, Mons, and Thais. In the north, the Chams, having adopted Indian cultural norms, were historically influenced by Chinese civilization. Surviving manifestations of Cham culture primarily belonged to priests and the royal court (created on their orders and according to their tastes), with folklore constituting only a small part.

Cham society was strongly tied to native localities and only then to family. For this reason, deities of the land held a significant place in Cham religion. The Chams were closely connected to ancestral cemeteries and kuts (ancestral tombs), with festivals dedicated to the clan temple, village, and ancestors playing a major role.

Education in Champa was limited to the elite. Princes of royal blood were raised by personal mentors who taught them the art of governance according to Dharma. Additionally, young men studied Indian philosophical and religious treatises, archery, and horseback riding. Apart from references to the education of royal children, no other evidence of education exists in Cham texts.

=== Calendar and festivals ===
The daily rhythm of Cham life was determined by seasons, lunar cycles, and harvests. Kings used a calendar system heavily influenced by religion. The Chams adopted the Ancient Indian calendar, incorporating Indian astronomy and a system of lunar months but were unfamiliar with the division into weeks. Numerous ephemerides existed in Champa, used by royal priests, astrologers, and ordinary Brahmins to determine auspicious days for establishing temples, ascending the throne, holding festivals, weddings, and funerals. Surviving Cham ephemerides vaguely resemble modern horoscopes.

Year numbers in Sanskrit texts were often represented by symbolic words to fit poetic meter. For example, words denoting emptiness (air, sky, etc.) represented zero; words for singular objects (earth, moon, etc.) represented one; and words for paired objects (eyes, ears, etc.) represented two. Thus, a date might be recorded as "year of fingers (10), tastes (6), and eyes (2)," meaning "1062 Shaka" (1140 CE), or "year of planets (9), mountains (7), and eyes (2)," meaning "972 Shaka" (1050 CE). Years were recorded either with numerals (mainly in prose Cham inscriptions) or symbolic words (in Sanskrit poetic inscriptions).

Peasants measured months by lunar phase changes and years by seasonal shifts. Sanskrit inscriptions used Indian month names, while Cham inscriptions designated days and months with ordinal numbers (except for the last two months, which had names). Sanskrit inscriptions in Champa mention months such as Chaitra or Tapasya, Vaishakha, Jyeshtha or Daistha, Ashadha or Shuchi, Ashvina, Magha, and Phalguna (all precise dates in texts refer to temple consecrations). Months like Shravana, Bhadrapada, Kartika, Margashirsha, and Pausha are not mentioned. Likely, the monsoon (July–September) and typhoon (October–December) months were considered inauspicious for major religious ceremonies, as no records of temple events exist for these periods.

The month was divided into two halves: waxing and waning moon (called "light" and "dark" halves in Sanskrit texts). Lunar month days were counted separately for each half, e.g., "5th day of the waxing moon of the 4th month." Days of the week were named after planets: Sunday (Sun), Monday (Moon), Tuesday (Mars), Wednesday (Mercury), Thursday (Jupiter), Friday (Venus), and Saturday (Saturn). Whether the Chams divided the day into hours and minutes is unknown, but they likely used water and sundials, as did their Khmer neighbors.

Cham inscriptions rarely discuss festivals. The calendar included a local New Year around February, with indirect evidence of festivals tied to the agricultural year and religious celebrations. However, while texts mention numerous temple consecrations, deity proclamations, and coronations, none describe how these festivals or accompanying ceremonies were conducted, nor do they provide dates for religious holidays.

=== Family ===
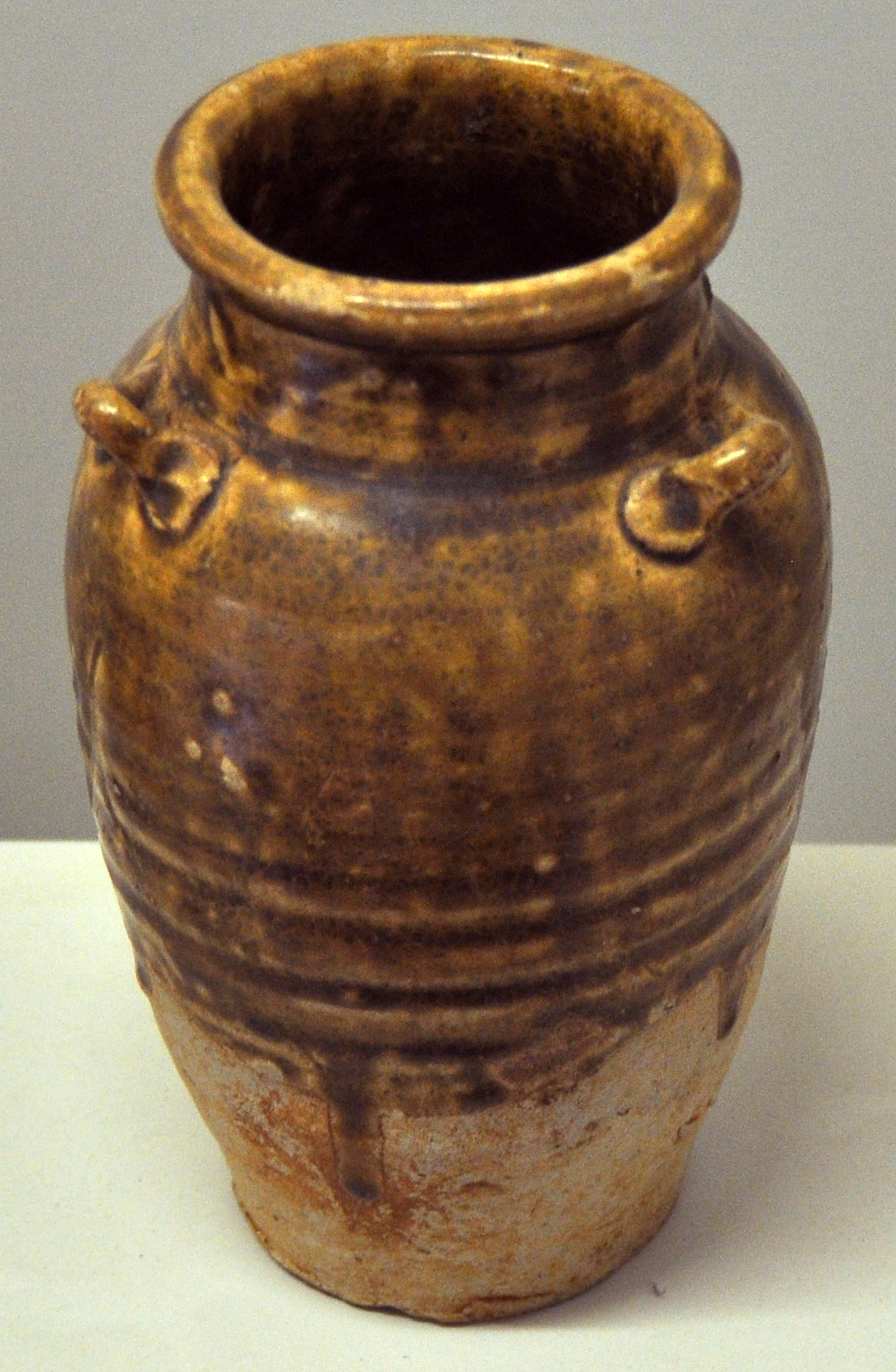
Cham jug, 13th–14th century

Unlike Khmer reliefs, Cham reliefs never depicted children. In the few inscriptions mentioning young princes ascending the Cham throne, it is explicitly stated that the child "lacked their own judgment". There is also a theory that children were not mentioned due to superstitions to avoid the evil eye. However, daughters, especially the youngest, played a significant role at the royal court, and their birth was highly desired.

Little is known about Cham marriage ceremonies, with only fragmentary evidence from Chinese chronicles. Typically, a matchmaker was required, and after successful matchmaking, the calendar of "auspicious days" was strictly followed. Relatives and friends helped the bride and groom dress at their respective homes. The groom was then sent for, proposed to the bride at her home, and she accepted. During marriage ceremonies, families honored ancestral altars and household spirits. By the 12th–13th centuries, Cham marriages were likely matrilocal — couples lived in the wife's mother's home, with the husband fully dependent on his wife's family.

In case of divorce, the husband returned to his family home, keeping only what he brought to the marriage. Children always remained with the mother's family, as did all jointly acquired property. If the husband brought a cow, he could take it upon divorce but had to leave its calves with his former wife.

These customs were closely tied to the longstanding matrilineal system in Champa, where kinship and inheritance were traced through the maternal line. Inscriptions often indicate that royal succession passed through the female line: after a king's death, his sister's son (nephew) inherited the throne. This highlights the significant role of women in Cham society, further reinforced by the cult of the goddess Po Nagar, the patroness of Champa.

Cham kings practiced polygamy, marrying women from various regions to form alliances with noble families. All sons from these marriages were potential heirs to the throne, so genealogies emphasized connections through their mothers and wives. The matrilineal kinship system allowed individuals to affiliate with a specific dynasty. The primary goal of these genealogies was not to prove the purity of a claimant's lineage but to secure support from as many allies as possible. Nothing is known about polygamy among ordinary Chams.

Cham inscriptions contain little information about family or daily life. Names were personal only, with no mention of parents' names or surnames. Children were often named after gods to invoke their protection or after virtues like "wisdom," "courage," or "mercy," believed to guide their lives. Sanskrit and Cham names coexisted. In royal families, names included the dynasty or the name of a mythical ancestor; in noble families not aspiring to the throne, names included the city of origin. Tracing Cham dynastic genealogies in depth is nearly impossible due to the lack of preserved archives or text collections spanning multiple generations.

=== Housing ===
Cham houses faced north, likely due to the intense heat. Commoners' homes had thatched roofs, while those of the elite were tiled (excavations have uncovered many tile fragments, indicating their widespread use). Commoners' houses had roof eaves extending no higher than a meter from the ground. Cham houses were likely not built on stilts and were predominantly single-story. Housing in Champa followed a hierarchy based on the homeowner's social status, with established levels for roof height and doorframe size.

Cham household items

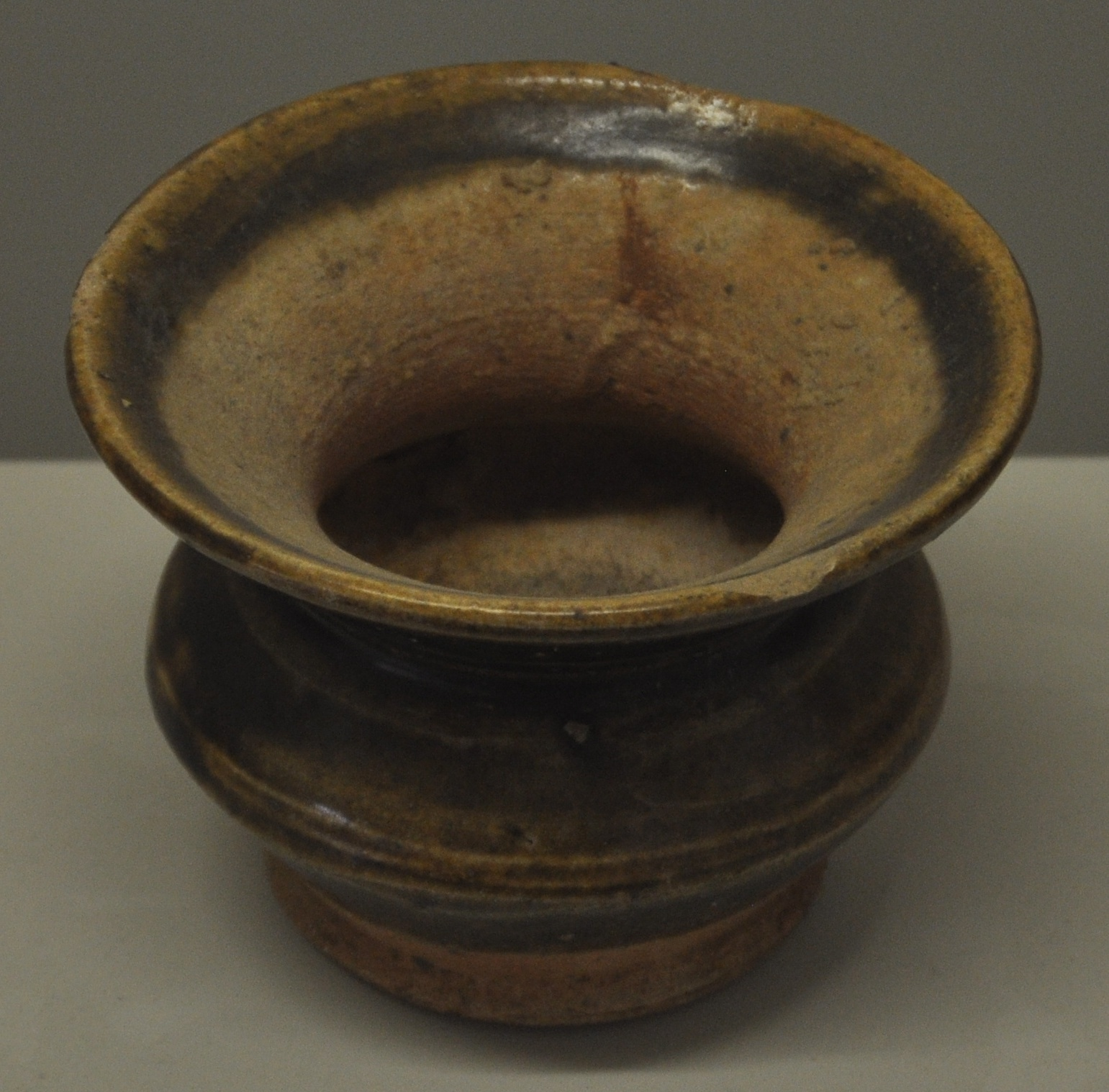
Spittoon, 13th–14th century

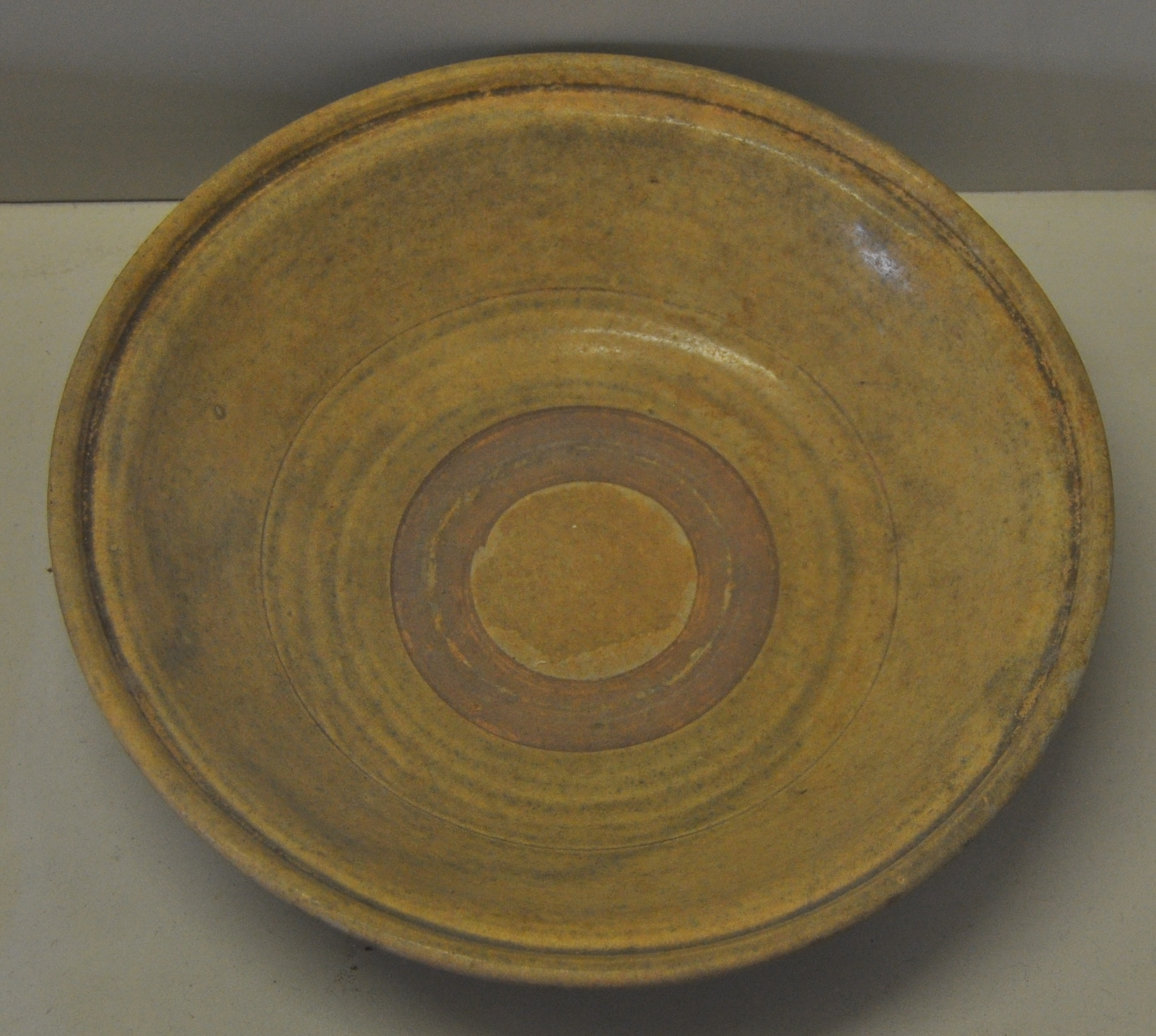
Plate, 13th–14th century

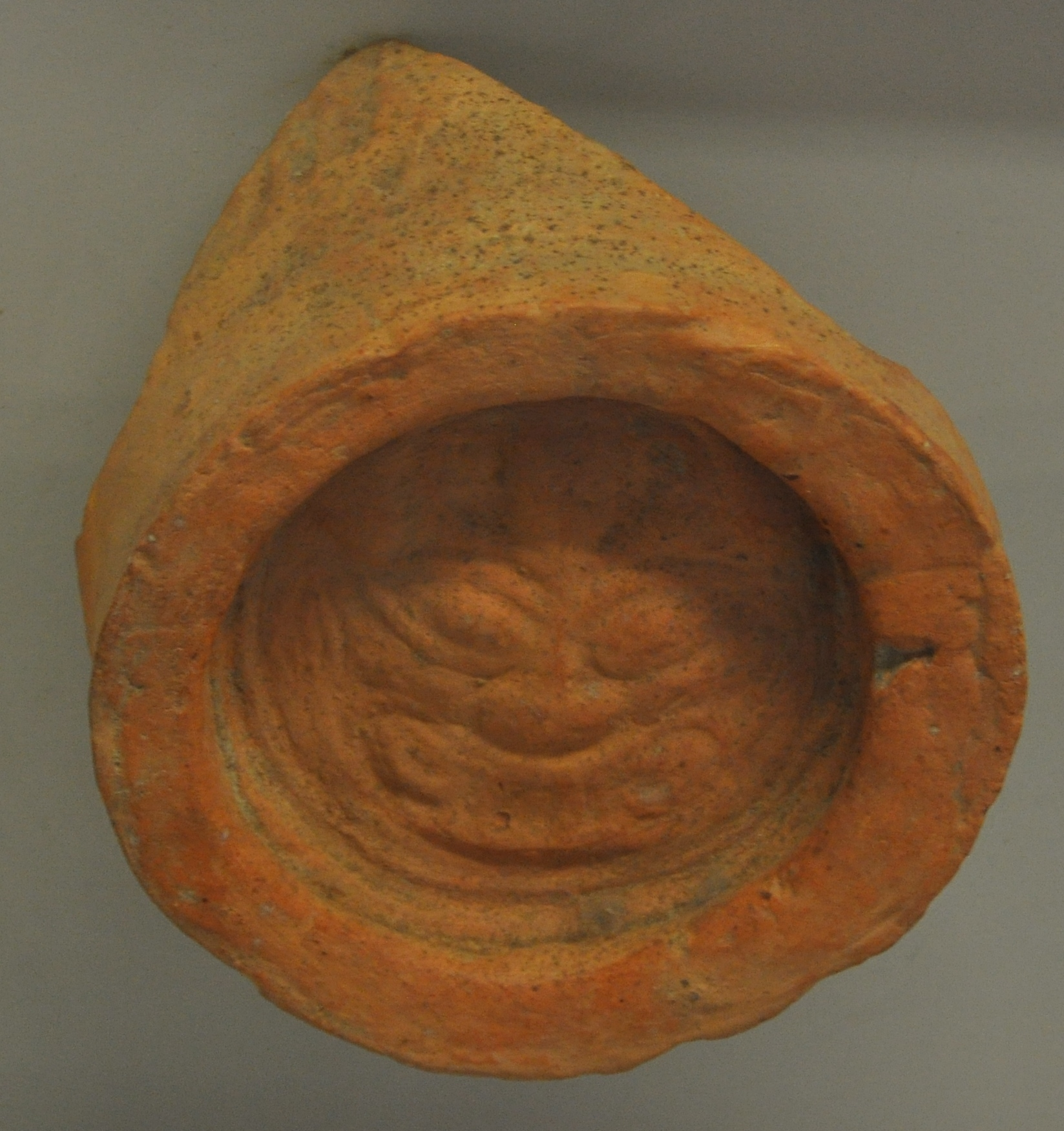
Roof tile, 11th–13th century

Families lived in multiple houses arranged around a shared courtyard in a specific order: the parents' and young children's house, the married woman's house, a guest house, a kitchen, and outbuildings (including a rice storage shed). Notably, the youngest daughter and her husband lived in the house where rice was stored. As the family's successor, she managed all family affairs. When building a new house, families performed rituals and made offerings to the spirit of the land and the spirits of the trees used in construction.

=== Leisure ===
During religious festivals, the Chams held various games and theatrical performances, some accompanied by sacrifices to the gods. The main games were polo, wrestling, chess, and cockfights. Depictions of horses appear from the 10th century. A relief from Quang Tri province in the Da Nang Cham Sculpture Museum shows two riders with long polo sticks. The horses are depicted in full tack with stirrups (the tack, except the bridle, resembles Chinese designs). Some Cham reliefs depict wrestlers in combat. The Chams also played a game with a shuttlecock and used swings, likely introduced from India as part of a religious ceremony involving swinging a deity's statue.

=== Healthcare ===
Life expectancy in Champa was low, and epidemics were frequent (texts suggest adolescents ascended the throne more often than men in their forties). Medical practices were accompanied by magical incantations and prayers. Monks prepared herbal remedies and recited tantras to ward off illness. Recovery was considered a miracle attributed to the gods, thanked through sacrifices. Illnesses were often blamed on evil spirits, believed to appear if ancestor and spirit cults were neglected. The Chams chewed betel leaves mixed with areca nut seeds, spices, wood resin, and slaked lime. Nobles spat the resulting red saliva into ornate spittoons. Betel chewing was stimulating and breath-freshening but damaged teeth and oral tissues. Unlike the Vietnamese, the Chams did not practice tooth blackening.

=== Clothing and adornments ===
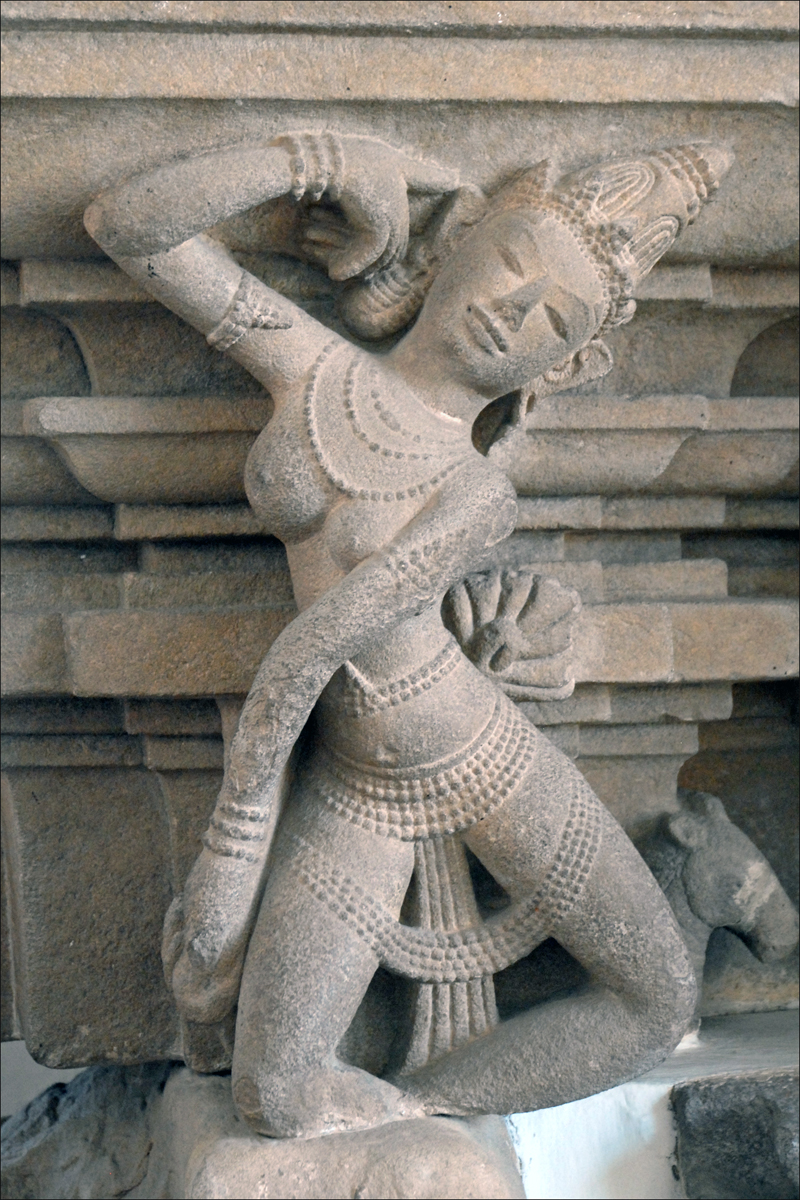
Dancer from a Cham altar, 7th–8th century

According to Cham statues and reliefs, women wore long, colorful sarongs, while dancers wore light trousers for ease of movement. Fabrics were decorated with embroidery and trimmings. Men wore a sampot—a piece of cloth tightly wrapped around the waist with a long flap passed between the legs and secured at the back. This flap was richly embroidered and adorned with jewelry. Commoners went barefoot, with only kings and gods depicted in sandals on reliefs.

Gods were often depicted bare-chested, but there is no evidence that most Chams dressed similarly. Royal garments consisted of colorful dresses with woven patterns, tied with cords decorated with pearls or gold plates. Kings wore thin shirts under their dresses, embroidered with braids or edged with gold.

For informal audiences, kings wore only a shirt. Formal attire was cinched with a gold belt adorned with pearls and decorated with flower garlands. Kings wore red leather sandals with embroidered designs. They adorned their necks, chests, fingers, and wrists with numerous jewelry pieces. Headwear, crowns, and diadems varied with fashion. Men typically wore their hair loose, though in the north, it was braided. Women tied their hair into a chignon secured with a band. Many noblewomen wore diadems with precious stones and dangling earrings.

== Literature ==
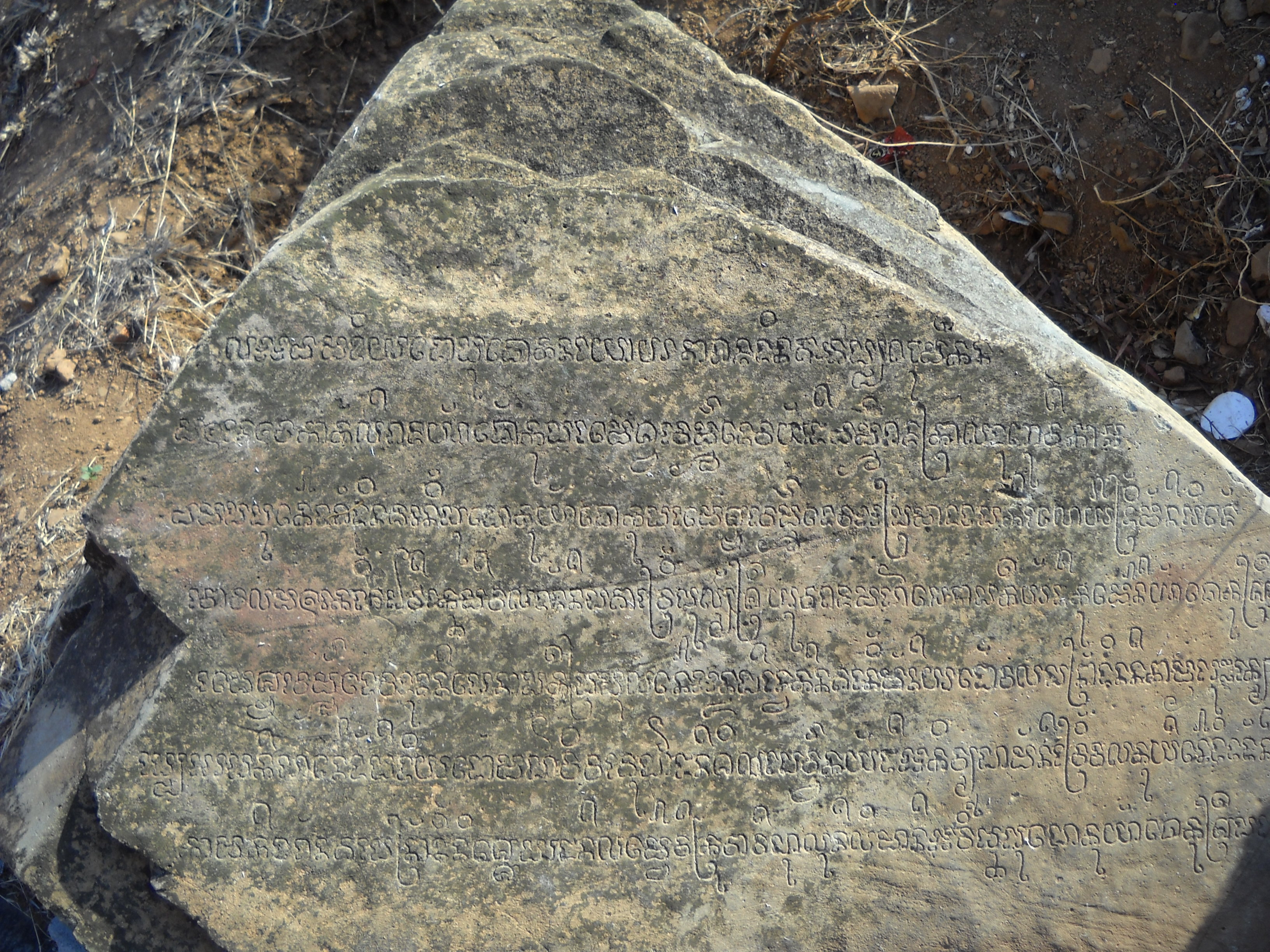
Stone inscription from the Po Klong Garai temple

Due to Indian influence, the Chams adopted the Pallava script and began using stone inscriptions to proclaim political and religious decrees. These inscriptions offer an internal perspective on Cham society, though fragmentarily, as they primarily reflect the views of the Cham elite who created them. The elite wrote and read in Sanskrit, while speaking Cham in daily life.

Cham society was bilingual, but this bilingualism was not simply "Sanskrit for the elite, Cham for commoners". The Sanskrit used in Cham inscriptions was not pure or highly literary, as in the Khmer Empire at its peak. Educated Chams did not master Sanskrit perfectly, and their poetic inscriptions contain many errors, disregarding the rules of meter and prosody. Understanding Sanskrit texts was likely not essential for the Chams, as they were primarily addressed to the gods. Sanskrit was, in effect, a foreign language for Champa, serving as a political tool overlaid on pre-existing local institutions.

The earliest Cham inscriptions date to the 5th century, dated only by paleography (the first author-dated text is from 658 CE). In the 5th century, under Indian influence, the Chams began regularly recording significant events. The first mention of the "land of the Chams" dates to the 7th century, when the Chams, despite their country's division into small kingdoms, recognized themselves as a single ethnic group. Stone inscriptions were primarily created to mark a ruler's authority over a territory. Thus, inscriptions allow reconstruction only of Champa's official history from the perspective of the ruling elite — kings, courtiers, Hindu and Buddhist clergy, and local princes (rajas).

The Pallava script was initially used to write in Sanskrit, so all inscriptions from the 5th to 9th centuries are in Sanskrit. These served as symbols of authority but were incomprehensible to most ordinary Chams. Moreover, Sanskrit inscriptions contain many barbarisms and solecisms, indicating not only limited knowledge of the language but also superficial understanding of Indian culture. In the 9th century, the first texts in the Cham language, part of the Austronesian language family (closely related to Malay and some Indonesian languages), appeared. Cham inscriptions used the same script as Sanskrit texts, with diacritical marks to indicate Cham pronunciation. Many Sanskrit texts were duplicated in Cham.

Despite the emergence of writing, the Cham language remained secondary, used for details such as land measurements in donations, while Sanskrit was used for worship. From the 9th to 11th centuries, Sanskrit was the more common language for inscriptions; from the 11th to 13th centuries, it was gradually replaced by Cham, which became the sole language of texts in the 13th to 15th centuries. From the 16th century, inscriptions disappeared, replaced by manuscripts in Middle Cham.

Only inscriptions on stone, brick, and silver or gold ritual objects have survived. (Note: The Chams did not use paper but wrote on finely processed, smoke-darkened sheepskin with sharpened bamboo sticks. No traces of these parchment documents remain.) These are official texts with political, religious, and legal content. However, oral Cham literature existed, including heroic epics recited from memory, fairy tales, legends, and proverbs. Reciters often performed with musicians and dancers, accompanying excerpts from the Ramayana and Mahabharata with music and dance.

== Religion ==
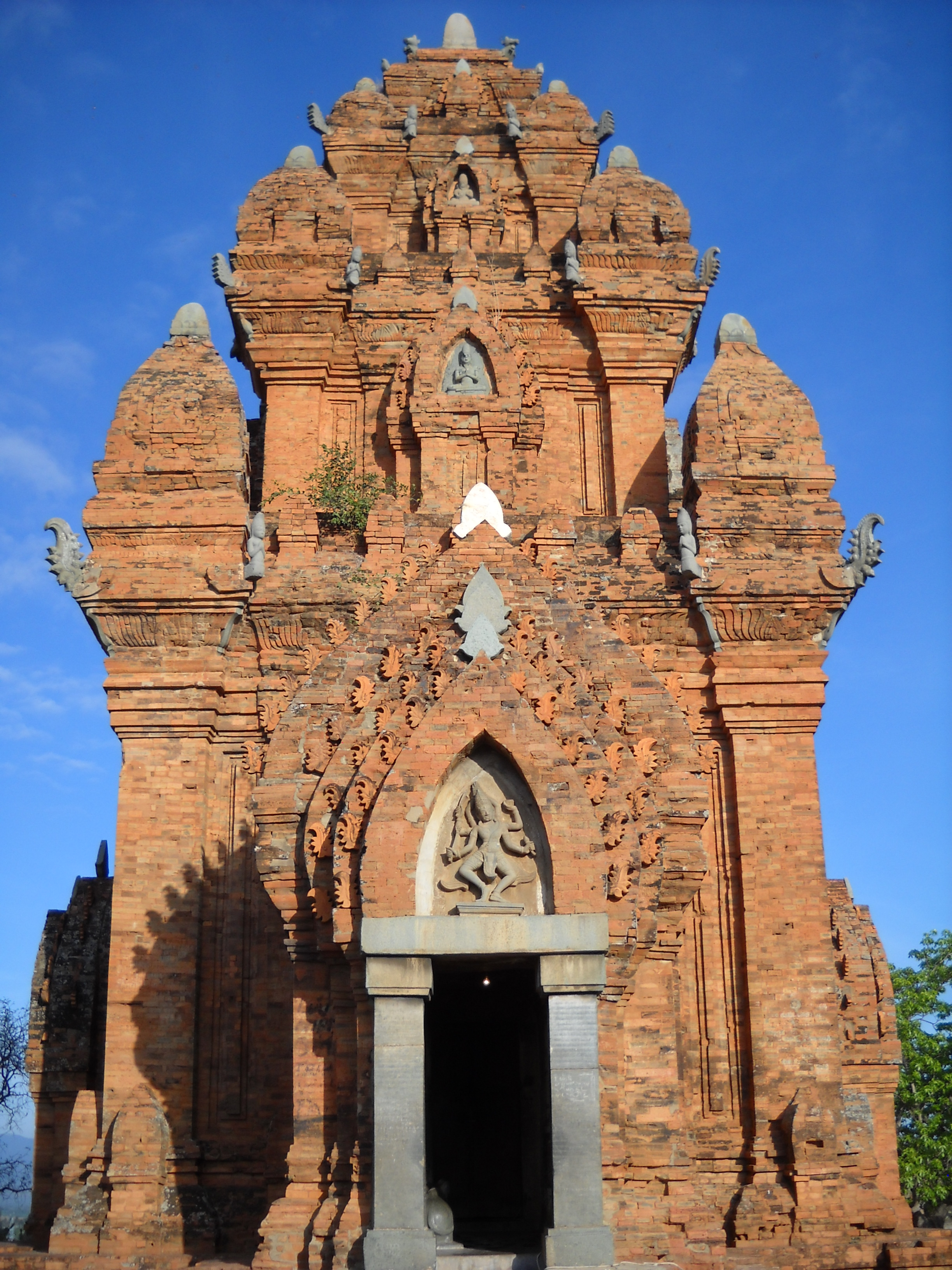
Po Klong Garai temple in Ninh Thuan province

In Champa, the history of the dominant religion was closely tied to royal authority. New religions and religious movements from abroad were gradually assimilated with older beliefs and rituals, particularly nature spirit cults and ancestor worship.

A hallmark of Champa was religious tolerance, with no religious practices excluding others; they intermingled and complemented each other. The difference was that Indian deities were part of a "cosmic" system, while local ones belonged to a "local" system. Thus, Hinduism and Buddhism from India coexisted peacefully with local beliefs.

Indian religions were adopted by the Chams in the early centuries CE through trade contacts with Indian merchants. Initially, Cham navigators likely visited South Indian ports, followed later by Indian ships reaching Champa's shores. The main trade route between India and Indochina ran from the Bay of Bengal through the Malacca Strait to the South China Sea.

The Chams adopted the Indian socio-political system not through a mass influx of Indians bringing their religion and culture but through the influence of a small number of merchants and monks. The Cham elite, attracted by Indian culture, first adopted these innovations. They then adapted this culture, along with Sanskrit, to Champa's context, expressed in specific monuments (temples, sculptures, and inscriptions). From the 5th century, trade links were supplemented by direct cultural influence from Indian civilization.

This influence was both political and religious. The small kingdom of Linyi, mentioned in Chinese chronicles, was the first to be Indianized. Subsequently, Cham kingdoms and principalities adopted Indian religions, along with artistic, political, and cultural models. The adoption of Sanskrit, primarily as the language of the cultural elite and clergy, was a key factor in spreading these models.

Hinduism and Buddhism appeared in Champa around the same time and always coexisted peacefully with local beliefs. However, Hinduism quickly became a political tool for royal authority. Despite their differing goals, many Cham inscriptions simultaneously praised Shiva and Buddha, and monks studied both philosophical-religious teachings. In Cham religious culture, Mahayana Buddhism and Shaivism were closely related, with some kings and nobles building temples and monasteries for both faiths. Shiva and Buddha were likely seen as very similar in Cham religious culture. The cult of Shiva did not exclude the later cult of Vishnu.

Cham sculptures of bodhisattvas
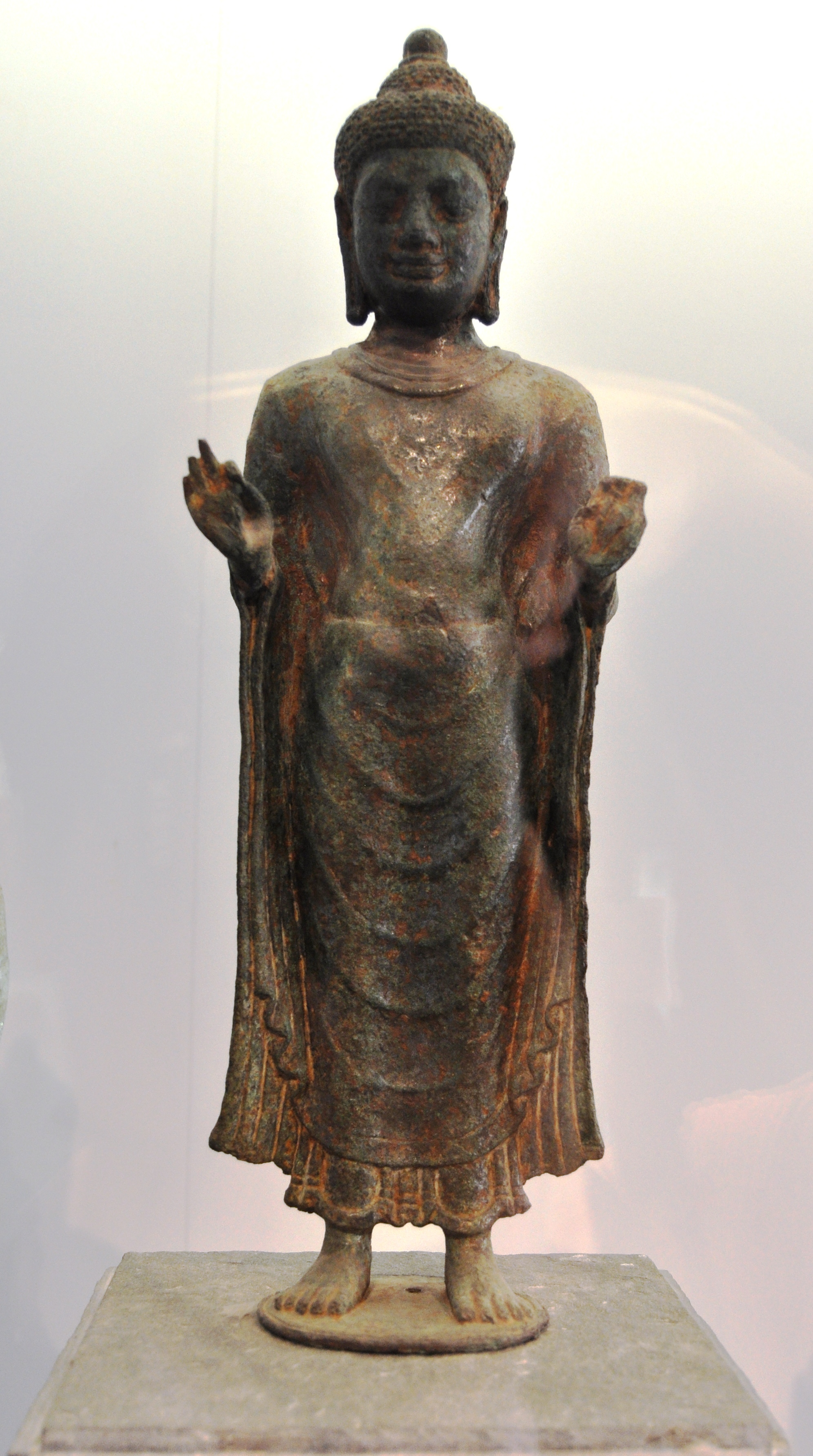
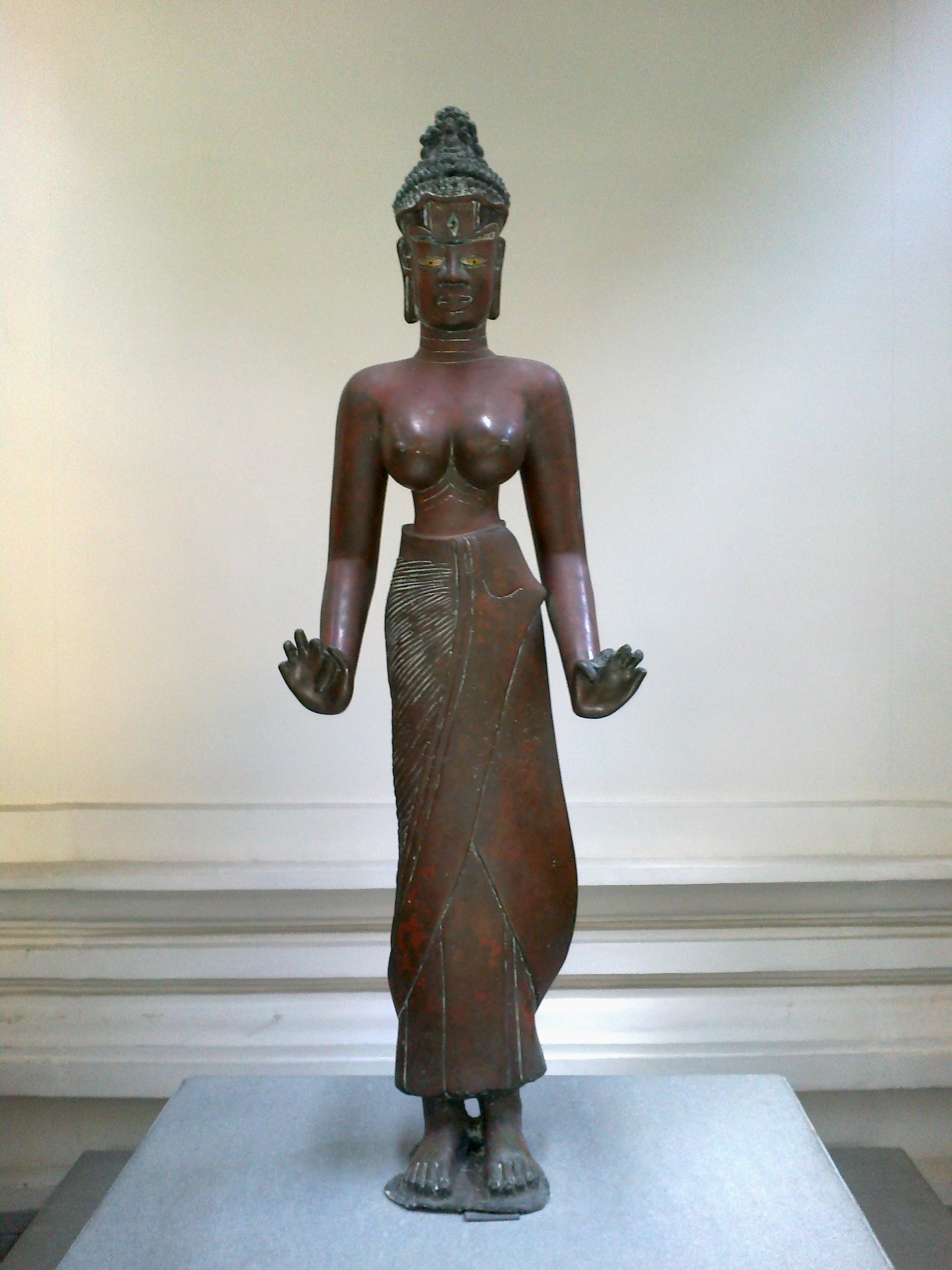
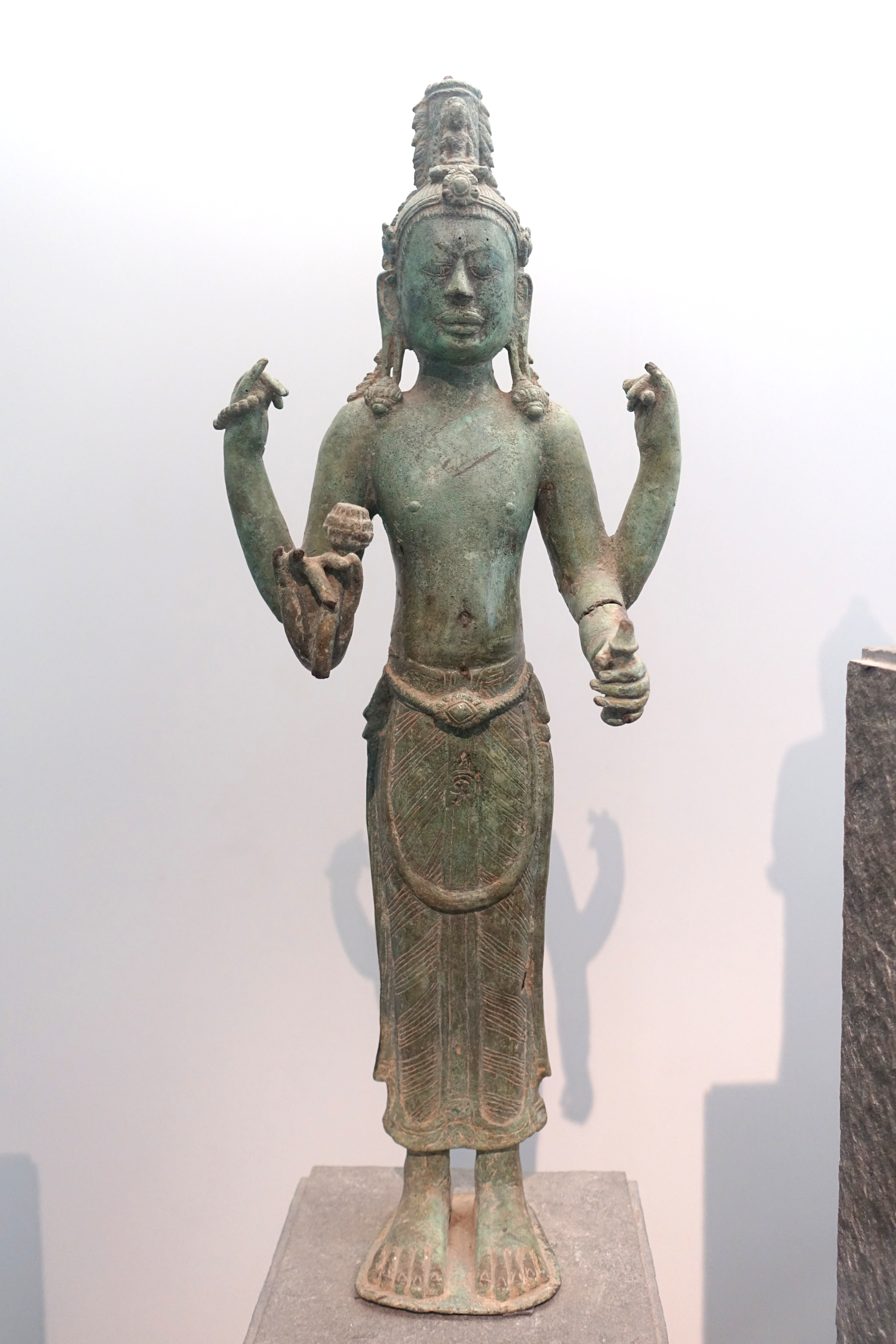

Buddhism was widely represented in Champa's court culture. Its flexibility regarding the number of worshipped deities allowed the inclusion of ancestor worship, particularly of female ancestors. Additionally, Cham Buddhism, with a strong inclination toward Vajrayana, incorporated many local spirits and esoteric imagery. Cham architecture rarely featured funerary monuments like stupas, intended for storing relics. Only the unique Buddhist sanctuary of Dong Duong preserved small stupas. Apart from the iconography of Buddha and bodhisattvas, little distinguishes Buddhist temples from Hindu ones in Champa.

=== Shaivism ===
Hinduism in the form of Shaivism became Champa's dominant religion from the advent of writing (around the 5th century). The earliest written traces of Cham history coincide with significant political and religious changes. Through maritime trade, rulers who gained royal titles and the Cham elite adopted Indian writing, customs, and religion. Before this, the country existed as a tribal society, leaving few traces — visible in ancestor worship and some customs but with no archaeological or written records from the pre-Hindu period.

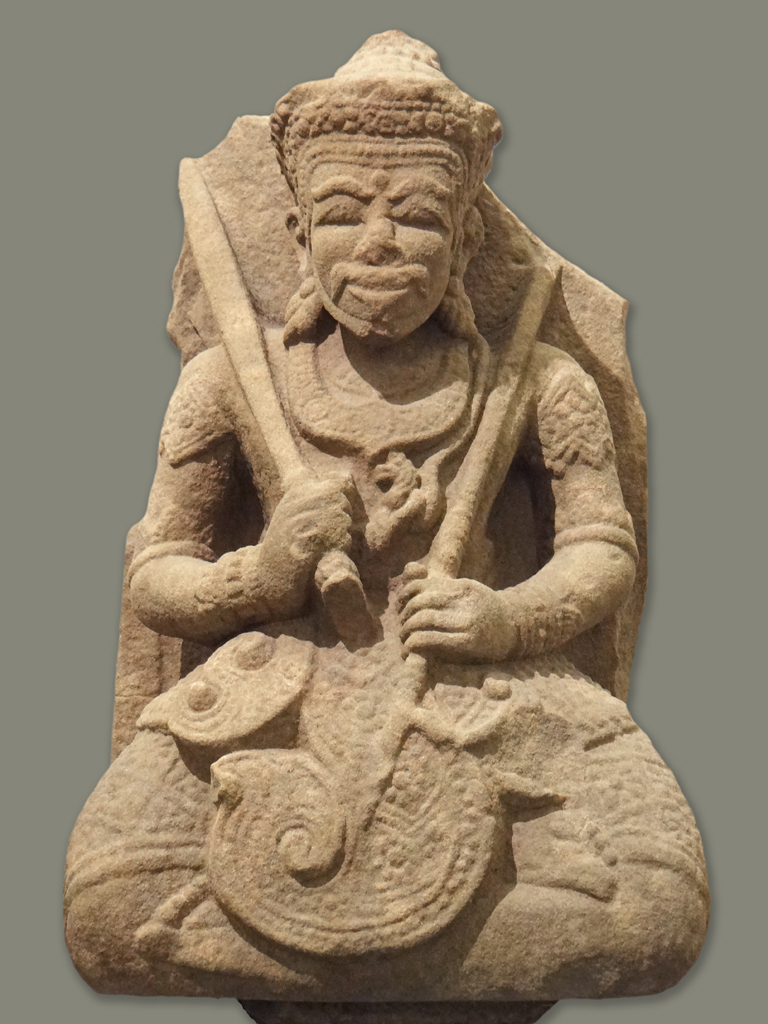
Shiva sculpture, 14th–15th century

The Cham king Bhadravarman I, who ruled in the late 4th to early 5th century, was a scholar of the Vedas. He invited prominent Brahmins from India to settle in Champa and actively promoted Hinduism among his subjects. After him, all Cham kings cultivated the idea of their "divine election," where the king relied on the support of a patron god. Bhadravarman is credited with founding the My Son sanctuary in the Thu Bon River valley and establishing the cult of Bhadreshvara, which became the personal deity of Cham kings and the patron of royal authority.

From Bhadravarman's time, Hinduism remained closely tied to Champa's ruling elite. Kings called themselves "descendants of Shiva," and inscriptions referred to them as "earthly gods." Hinduism allowed kings to be seen as intermediaries between the heavens, home of the gods, and the earth, where people lived. It also enabled genealogical constructions rooted in mythology, explaining the divine nature of royal authority. Some Cham kings were likened to Vishnu or Indra, but Shaivism generally remained the leading Hindu religion.

According to Cham inscriptions, under Bhadravarman, the Hindu pantheon worshipped by the Chams included Shiva and his consort Uma, as well as Bhadreshvara (an incarnation of Shiva whose sacred footprints were venerated by kings and royal families). Even then, Cham kings made generous donations to My Son and neighboring temples, particularly to the lingams installed there.

By the 6th century, the Hindu pantheon worshipped in various sanctuaries (usually established by the king, less often by family members or prominent nobles) was largely established. Most frequently mentioned are Shiva, Vishnu, Brahma, and their consorts Parvati, Lakshmi, and Sarasvati, respectively, as well as Indra, Kubera, Ganesha, Agni, Varuna, Surya, and Vayu (the lokapalas symbolized the five elements needed for sacrifices). Most depictions of these gods adhered to Indian canons.

Throughout Champa's history, local Hinduism was highly selective, excluding harsh rituals, strict taboos, or terrifying deities like Bhairava or Kali. Cham iconography never depicted gods in fearsome forms. All deity names reflected their benevolence and willingness to aid humans. Thus, the Cham pantheon was smaller than the Indian one due to the absence of "dark forms" of many gods. However, unlike the Khmers, the Chams gave significant prominence to female deities. Frequent citations of the Agamas and other scriptures indicate the spread of various sectarian Hindu movements in Champa, such as Shaiva and Pashupata.

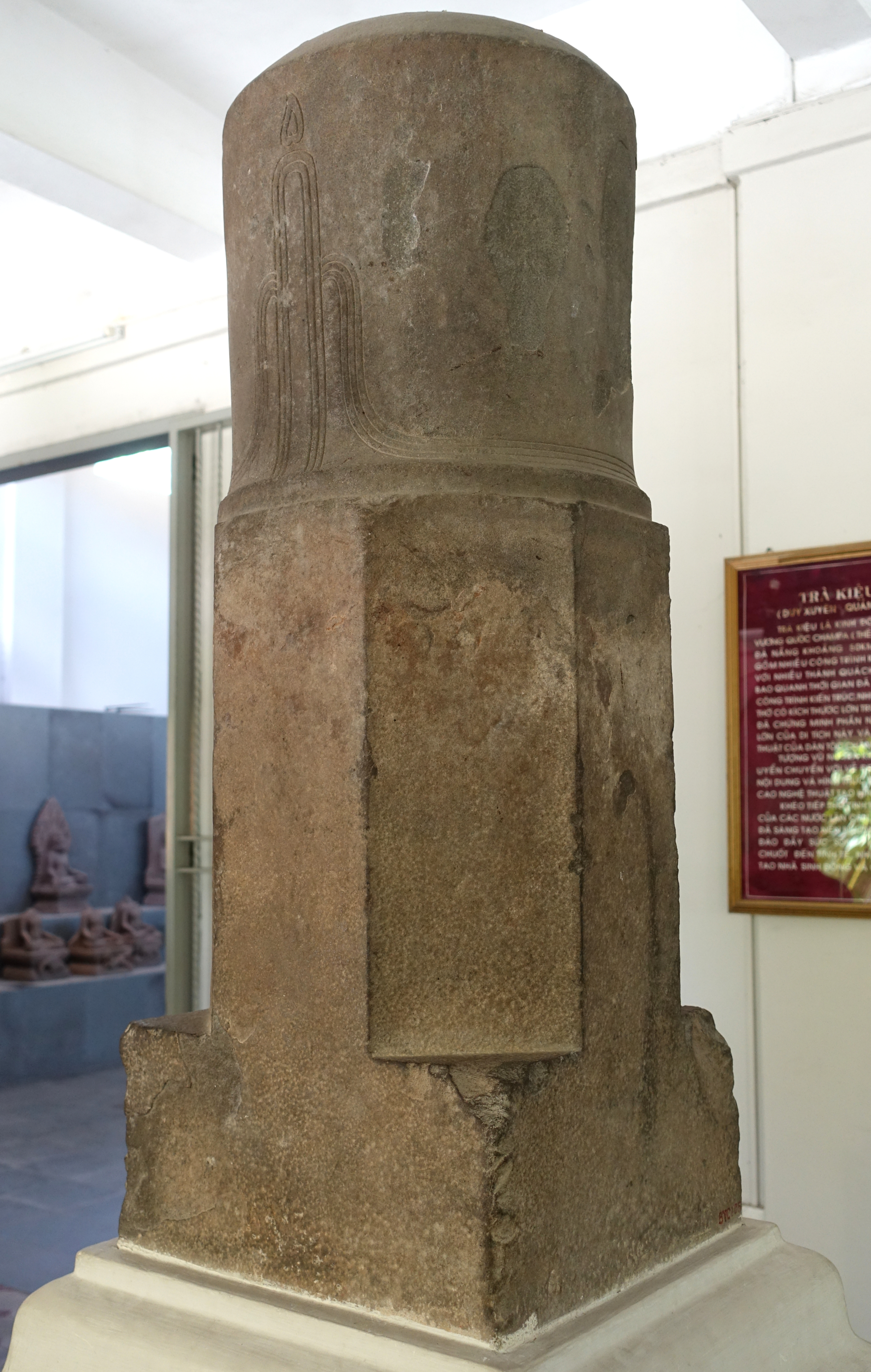
Lingam from Tra Kieu, 7th–8th century

The cult object of Shaivism—the lingam—was considered a "sign" of the deity, a phallic symbol representing the universe and nature, originating from the female principle Yoni. Lingams were made from stones, often natural ones found locally or specifically installed in sanctuaries. In Champa, the lingam cult became popular partly because it inherited the ancient worship of sacred territories around wild stones. Each lingam symbolized a specific Shiva, the patron god of the locality, on whom the local population's prosperity depended. Cham kings gave lingams they installed their own names, as kings were also considered a form of Shiva (notable examples include the lingams of Bhadravarman and Sambhuvarman).

Lingams were constantly offered milk and food. The most sacred were "self-manifested" lingams (svayambhu), believed to emerge from the earth. Superstitious Chams believed that removing such lingams would lead to the downfall of both Champa and the ruling dynasty. From the 7th century, inscriptions mention mobile lingams used in processions and other religious ceremonies, as well as mukhalinagas — "lingams with faces," depicting the god emerging from the lingam to incarnate in the king. Such a king was called Shivamukha ("face of Shiva"), as the face "emerging" from the lingam was that of the god dwelling within.

Mukhalinagas were of two types: lingams carved with the deity's face and koshas—ornamental covers for lingams. Koshas were made of gold or silver, depicting one or multiple faces of the god, and inlaid with precious and semi-precious stones (rubies, diamonds, sapphires, topazes, and quartz). Multi-faced koshas had four, five, or six faces, symbolically guarding different directions and regions of Champa. Over time, koshas themselves became objects of worship, venerated alongside the lingam. Koshas were used in religious processions, representing their lingams, and are mentioned only in royal inscriptions, adorning lingams in royal temple complexes like My Son, Po Nagar, and Dong Duong.

=== Vaishnavism ===
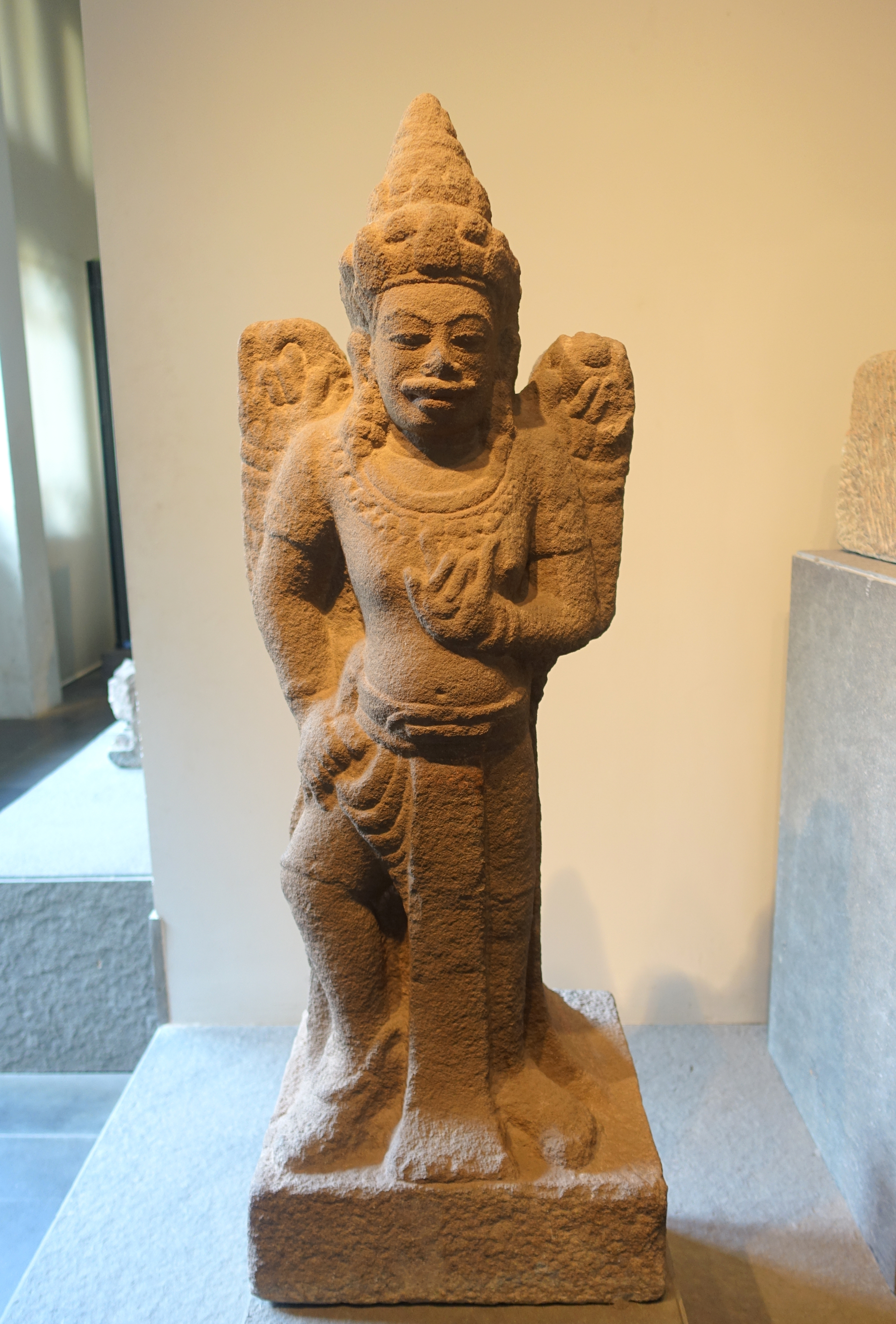
Vishnu sculpture, 10th century

Vaishnavism entered Champa from Funan or Chenla, where characteristic depictions of crowned Vishnu date back to the 5th century. It likely arrived, like other Indian religions, through traders and sailors frequenting Cham ports. Most references to the Vaishnavite cult in Cham inscriptions date to the mid-7th century and are associated with King Vikrantavarman I.

He was a long-time ally of the Khmers, married to the daughter of King Ishaanavarman I, but was expelled from Chenla for unknown reasons. Vikrantavarman left the most traces of the Vishnu cult in Champa, though Vaishnavism did not gain widespread or lasting popularity among the Chams. This religious freedom among royal dynasty members was due to the fact that, while all kings revered Shiva as Champa's patron, each was free to patronize their personal gods.

Vaishnavism was likely adopted by the ruling Cham dynasty from the Khmers due to close contacts between the neighboring states. This is evidenced by the style of temple E1 in My Son, built under Khmer influence in the mid-7th century. Later traces of Vaishnavism in Champa are sporadic, but references to the Ramayana and Vaishnavite elements in the iconography of some temples suggest the cult of Vishnu persisted. For instance, a depiction of Krishna on a pedestal from Tra Kieu (10th century) and sculptural scenes from the Ramayana on the base of a Shaivite temple indicate that Vaishnavism existed within a syncretic Hindu pantheon after Vikrantavarman's reign.

=== Temple centers ===
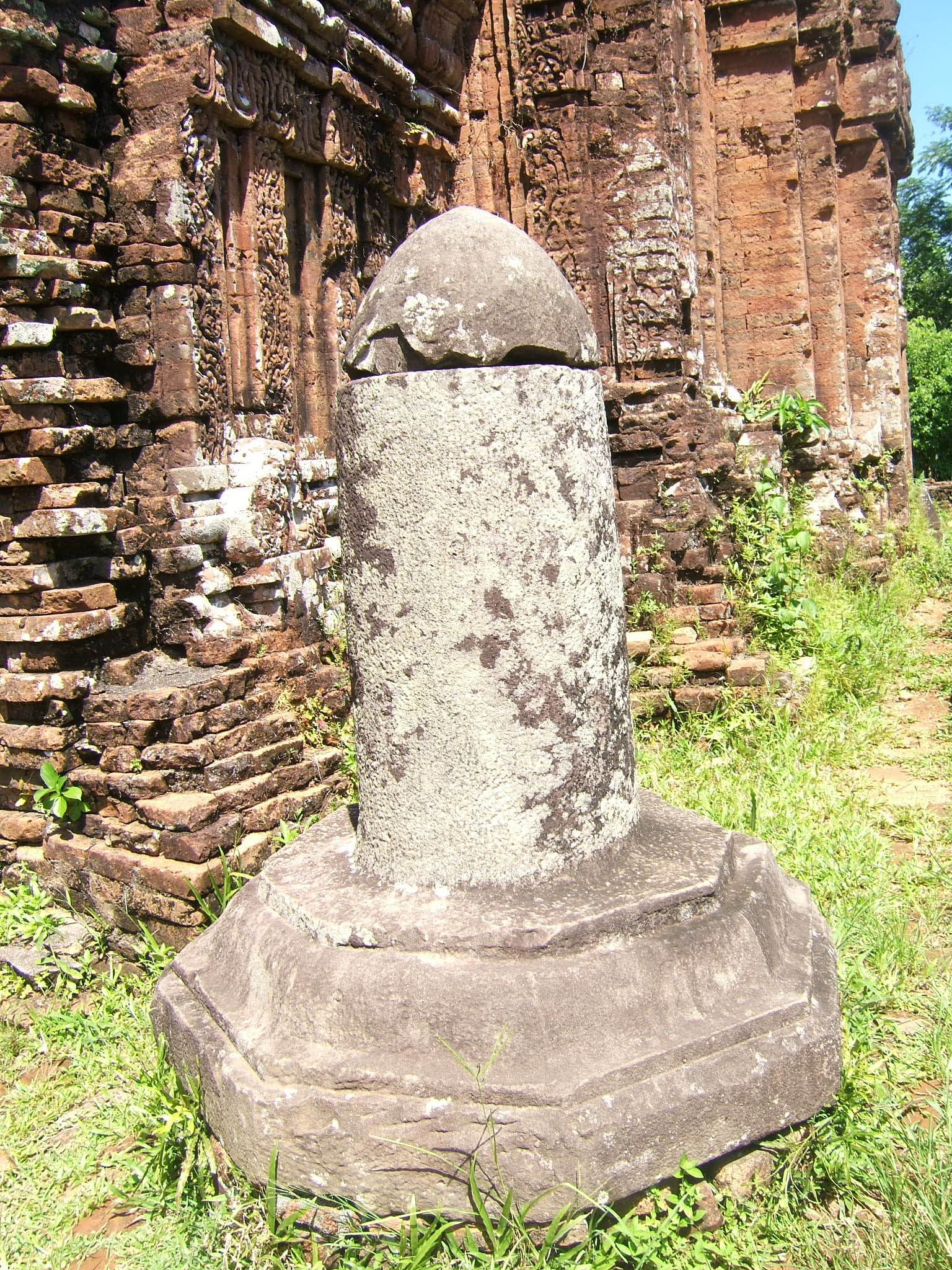
One of the lingams of My Son, dated to the 10th century

The cult of Shiva, closely linked to royal authority and specific ruling dynasties, was organized around two main temple centers in Champa: My Son (modern-day Duy Phu village, Duy Xuyen district, Quang Nam province) and Po Nagar (modern-day Nha Trang, Khanh Hoa province). Initially, both temples were dedicated to Shiva, worshipped in the form of a temple lingam. In My Son, this was known as Bhadreshvara, while the name of the mukhalinaga ("lingam with a face") in Po Nagar is unknown. In both temples, kings added their names to the lingams to signify divine patronage. For example, King Bhadravarman worshipped Ishvara Bhadreshvara (bhadra ishvara, meaning "benevolent lord"), and King Sambhuvarman worshipped Ishvara Shambhubhadreshvara (shambhu bhadra ishvara, meaning "auspicious and benevolent lord"). By building a temple for their personal patron god in My Son, each successive Cham king linked the royal cult of Champa to the ancient god Bhadreshvara.

From the 5th–6th centuries, My Son established a reputation as a sacred royal site, regardless of where Champa's capital was or which dynasty held the throne. By the mid-7th century, alongside Bhadreshvara's lingam, other deities were worshipped in My Son in the form of lingams, reflecting the popularity of the royal ancestor cult. From the mid-8th to mid-9th centuries, no new inscriptions appeared in the My Son area; they are found only in the southern kingdoms of Kauthara and Panduranga, suggesting a shift in Champa's center. Most royal inscriptions come from the Po Nagar temple in Kauthara. The goddess Po Nagar—Champa's earthly goddess, identified in Sanskrit texts as Bhagavati, Shiva's consort—came to prominence.

The "lingam with a face" (mukhalinaga) appeared in the Po Nagar temple in the 7th century. According to inscriptions, it protected Kauthara from various calamities. The lingam depicted Shiva and Bhagavati merged in one body. In 774, Po Nagar was destroyed by invaders, but a decade later, King Satyavarman rebuilt the temple, installing the Satyamukhalinaga. Around this time (late 8th century), Bhagavati was called the "goddess of Kauthara," and her cult as the patroness of kings quickly evolved into the patroness of Champa.

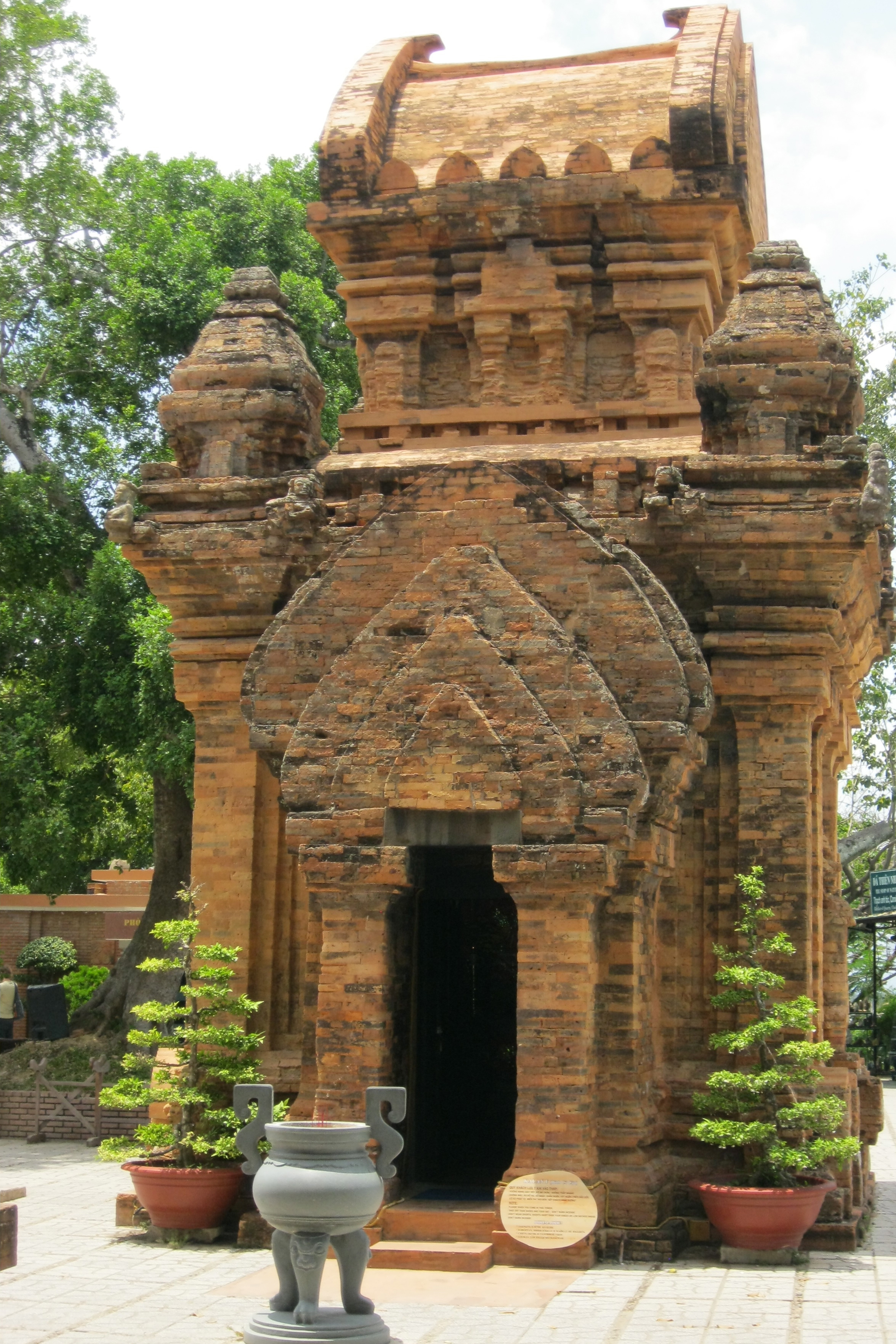
Ganesha temple in the Po Nagar complex

Later Cham texts no longer mention Po Nagar's legendary lingam; the cult now centered on the goddess of Champa, Yang Pu Nagara (or Po Nagar). A new temple, the largest in the complex, was built in her honor, emphasizing elements of Shaktism, while elements of Bhadreshvara's cult—My Son's deity—were diminished. Thus, in southern Champa, the cult of the goddess Po Nagar (Bhagavati) became independent of Shiva's cult (Bhadreshvara) and existed autonomously.

Under King Indravarman I, the center of royal authority shifted to the new capital, Virapura, in Panduranga (its exact location is unknown). Continuing tradition, Indravarman established the cult of a new god, Indrabhadreshvara. When the Indrapura dynasty solidified its rule in the second half of the 9th century, its founder, the Buddhist Jaya Indravarman (also Indravarman II), continued worshipping Bhadreshvara in My Son. New texts reflect evolving religious beliefs, using mythology to narrate the legitimacy of the new dynasty and Bhadreshvara's superiority over Po Nagar of Kauthara.

Followers of Bhadreshvara and Po Nagar sought to prove the greater "antiquity" of their deity (Bhadreshvara's adherents introduced the legendary ancestor King Uroja, sent to earth by Shiva himself). The history of My Son's lingam changed, now described as a gift from Shiva, making the patron god of Champa the personal patron of the "king of kings."

From the 11th century, Champa waged constant wars with Dai Viet. Despite this, both major sanctuaries continued receiving generous offerings from kings and courtiers. Ishanabhadreshvara was the primary god of Champa's kings, while Po Nagar was the guardian of the land and a powerful earthly deity, embodying the "nourishing earth." During conflicts with the Vietnamese and Khmers, male and female deities became equal. Even the Vietnamese revered Po Nagar, seeing her as a "goddess of the land" who brought rain (in 1069, alongside other Cham deities, the Vietnamese elevated Po Nagar to a guardian spirit of Dai Viet).

In the late 12th century, the Khmers captured Champa, and many temples were destroyed or looted. In 1233, King Jaya Parameshvaravarman II donated a statue of Po Nagar to the Kauthara temple, and in 1234, he gifted a silver kosha with a golden face to the My Son temple. Few epigraphic sources from after the 14th century survive, but they indicate both cults persisted. The cult of Po Nagar (Bhagavati) encapsulated Cham beliefs about the land, while the cult of Shiva (Bhadreshvara) placed Cham kings under heavenly protection. As long as Champa remained strong, both sanctuaries thrived, but with the weakening of the state and royal authority, both temple complexes declined (Po Nagar less so, as it was in the unconquered south).

=== Mahayana and Vajrayana ===
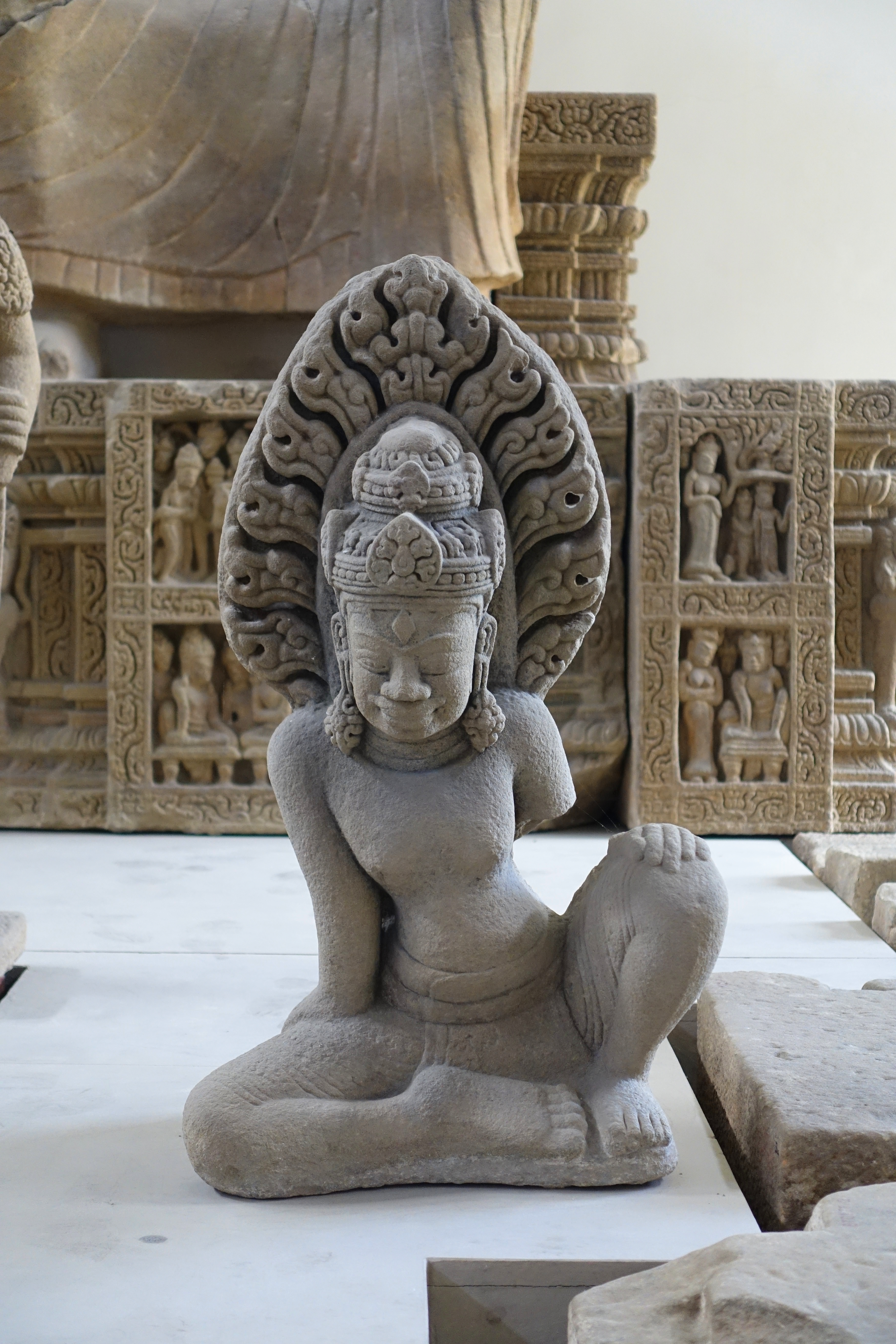
Buddhist sculpture from a pedestal in Dong Duong, late 9th–early 10th century

Almost all Cham kings were versed in both Hindu and Buddhist teachings. Archaeological findings show that Buddhism spread in Champa simultaneously with Hinduism. Neither inscriptions nor Cham iconography provide evidence of Theravada Buddhism; this tradition spread among the Chams much later. In ancient times, Champa practiced only Mahayana and Vajrayana. Inscriptions referencing Mahayana Buddhist rituals appear in the 9th century and disappear in the second half of the 12th century. However, Buddhism's influence was limited in inscriptions, as they were primarily a tool of royal authority, which predominantly followed Shaivism.

Buddhism's influence on the broader population was far greater than on the ruling elite, as evidenced by numerous archaeological monuments. At certain times, Cham kings were Buddhist adherents, though they continued to worship Shiva as Bhadreshvara or Shambhubhadreshvara. Some kings were called chakravartinraja ("king who turns the wheel of Dharma"), indicating their Buddhist allegiance. The founder of the Indrapura dynasty, Jaya Indravarman, a Buddhist, established the Avalokiteshvara monastery named Lakshmindra Lokeshvara (modern Dong Duong) in 875. After him, many Indrapura dynasty kings and their courtiers patronized Mahayana monks and monasteries.

Even after the Indrapura dynasty ended in the late 10th century, Buddhism coexisted with Hinduism, not competing but occupying its place in the elite's culture. The Bodhisattva Avalokiteshvara was widely depicted in Cham art. Dong Duong (modern Thang Binh district, Quang Nam province) featured stupas, possibly indicating later Vietnamese influence, as the Chams did not traditionally build such structures. The temple complex's architecture shows Khmer and Javanese influences, with Chinese elements in its sculpture. Buddhism in the Dong Duong monastery was likely infused with foreign influences.

In the mid-11th century, King Jaya Parameshvaravarman of Panduranga founded a Buddhist monastery, and in the 1080s, the Buddhist king Paramabodhisattva belonged to another dynasty. Apart from a few Sanskrit inscriptions indicating various Mahayana forms and its evolution into Vajrayana, most Cham Buddhist monuments cannot be precisely dated. The creation periods of notable sites like the Marble Mountains caves in Quang Nam and the Phong Nha area in northern Quang Binh are unknown. In Phong Nha, many terracotta medallions depicting Buddha, Avalokiteshvara, and a female deity (possibly Tara or Prajnaparamita) were found.

Vajrayana, or Tantric Buddhism, spread in Southeast Asia between the 8th and 10th centuries. An inscription from the early 10th century at the Pramudita Lokeshvara monastery describes the practice of secret and symbolic tantras. Cham Vajrayana emphasized the cult of three "major" Buddhas: Shakyamuni, Amitabha, and Vairochana, and three "minor" Buddhas: Vajradhara, Lokeshvara, and Vajrasattva. Many Tantric teachings and practices coexisted with Shaivism.

=== Local cults ===
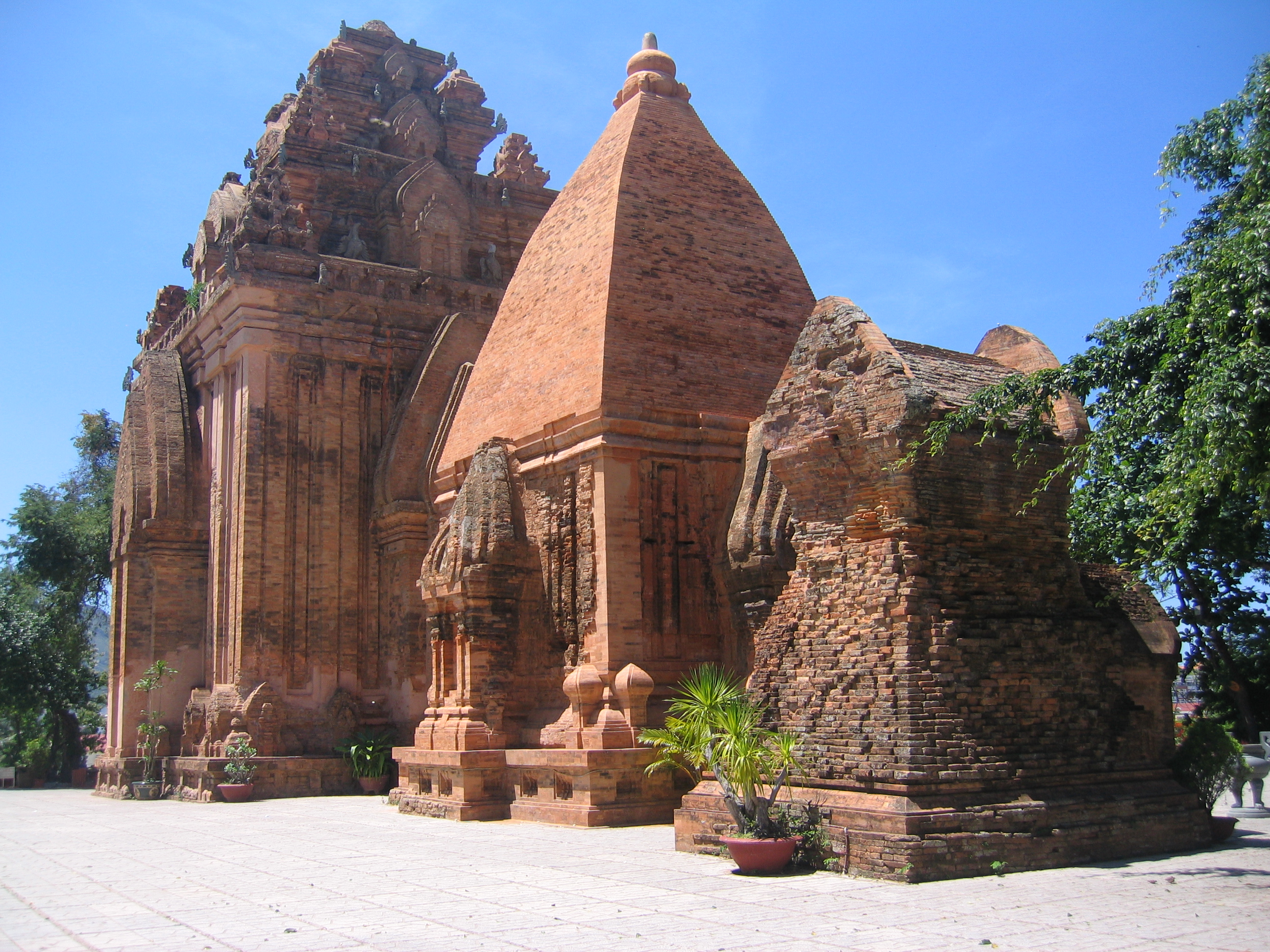
Po Nagar temple

The most traces of ancient local cults and beliefs are preserved in the Po Nagar temple in Nha Trang. These so-called "folk" beliefs coexisted peacefully with "official" cults from India throughout Champa's history.

Among Champa's local cults was Animism, particularly belief in nature spirits. The Chams feared the unknown and "evil forces," especially the jungles—seen as realms of violence, chaos, and savagery. They contrasted ancient cults tied to wild nature with religions practiced on cultivated plains and in cities. Inscriptions on a sacrificial jug and dish dedicated to the "Lord of the Forest" are a characteristic example of folk beliefs.

Local cults deified the power of the earth in trees or stones. The cult was always linked to a local deity, which, in turn, was associated with land ownership rights. Stones (later lingams) were anointed with oil or incense to ensure rain and fertility in the area the stone represented. Through such ceremonies, the stone itself became a deity capable of influencing nature spirits. The Chams also revered ancestor spirits, local heroes, deceased individuals, spirits of water bodies, forests, and solitary stones, with earth spirits holding particular significance.

=== Female deities ===
The worship of a mother goddess, earth goddess, and protector of the country and its people was widespread in Champa. This role was filled by Yang Pu Nagara, or Po Nagar (identified in Sanskrit inscriptions as Bhagavati). Her main sanctuary was in Kauthara (modern Nha Trang), so from the 8th century, she was called the "goddess of Kauthara." Traditionally, she was worshipped as a golden or stone statue (the original statue, adorned with gold and gems, was stolen by invading Khmers in the 9th century). From the 11th century, when Cham-language texts appeared in Kauthara, she was called the "goddess of the land" or "earth goddess" (Yang Pu Nagara).

From the 10th century, the cult of Po Nagar extended beyond Kauthara, complementing the cult of Bhadreshvara, the patron god of Cham kings centered in My Son. It was no longer a local (southern) cult but one of two deities protecting the entire country. Even the Vietnamese, colonizing northern Cham lands, incorporated Po Nagar into their pantheon, partly to appease the defeated and hasten Cham assimilation.

By the 11th century, the Po Nagar temple was a religious center revered by all Chams. Later texts called Po Nagar the "Black Lady," further emphasizing her connection to the earth. In addition to Po Nagar, the Chams worshipped two female bodhisattvas—Mahayana's Prajnaparamita and Tantric Tara, embodying female compassion. Some Buddhist deities took female forms and were worshipped within the ancestor cult.

=== Ancestor cult ===
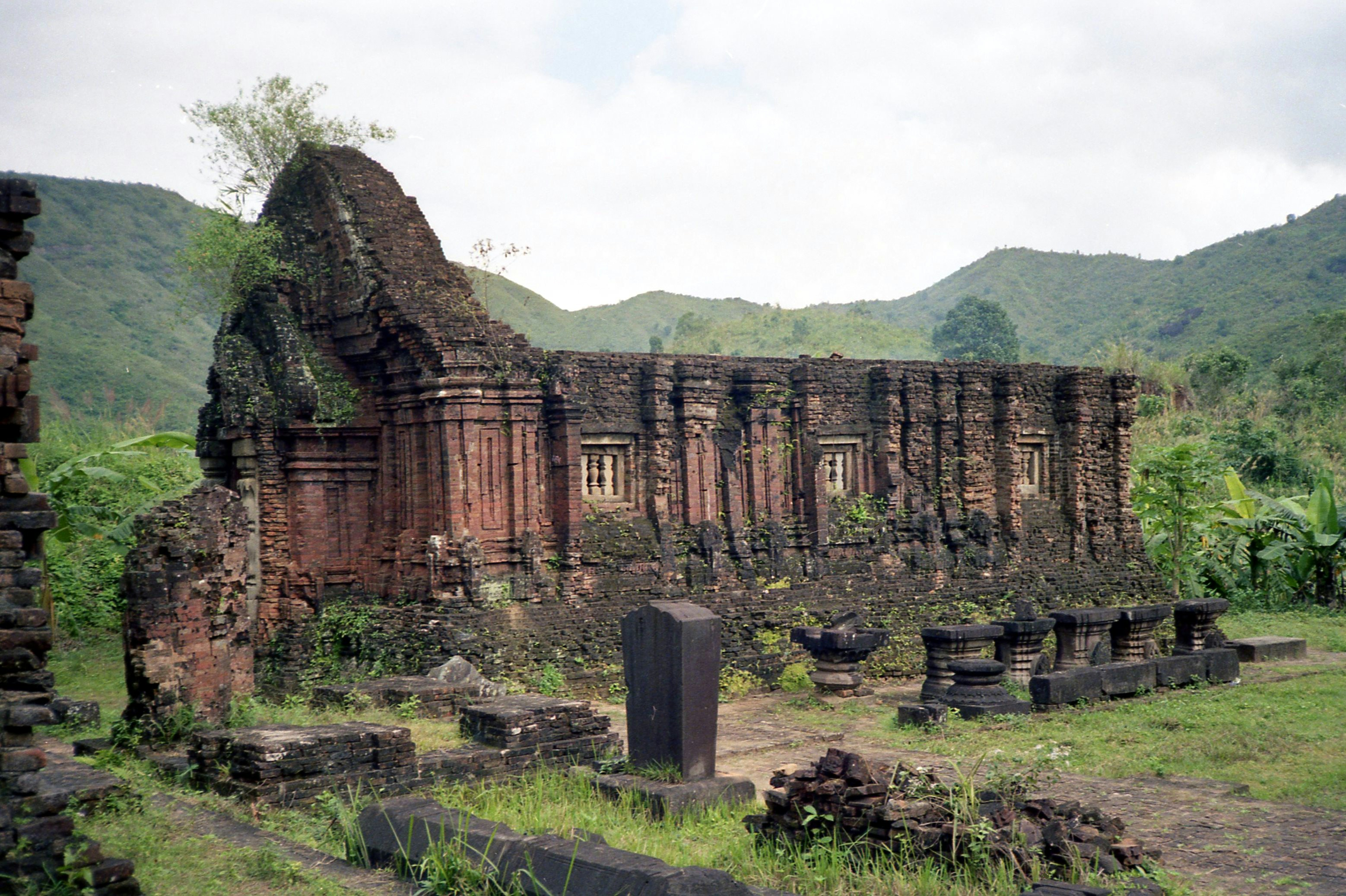
Ruins of My Son

The cult of ancestors—founders of ruling dynasties—held a special place in Cham religion. They were worshipped in temples alongside gods, with ceremonies involving their images. As early as the 7th century, in My Son, alongside the cult of Bhadreshvara, deities of the royal ancestor cult, Ishaneshvara and Prabhasheshvara, were revered. In Sinhapura, a temple honored Kandarpadharman, the father of a king's great-grandmother. Descendants of King Prakashadharman introduced the cult of Prakashabhadreshvara. Thus, successive kings were seen as continuators of dynastic ancestors, who were gods emerging from the lingam.

The wife of the Indrapura dynasty's founder (875–989), Rajakula Haradevi, introduced several cults: the god Indraparameshvara (in honor of her late husband Jaya Indravarman), the god Rudraparameshvara (for her father Rudravarman), and the goddess Rudroma (for her mother). Her nephew established the cult of the goddess Haromadevi in her honor, and in the mid-11th century, a Cham king built the Rajakula Buddhist monastery in her name. These deified ancestors, incorporated into the Cham pantheon, were represented by statues with some resemblance to their real prototypes.

From the 10th century, Cham inscriptions increasingly mention the cult of royal ancestors. Each ruling dynasty sought to spread its ancestor's cult across Champa. Examples of ancestor cults also appeared in noble families close to the royal court, who began erecting sanctuaries with statues of their dynastic founders. Ordinary Cham families worshipped ancestors at home, but due to the nature of their dwellings, no traces remain. Thus, Champa had both a national cult of royal ancestors and a private family cult practiced in commoners' homes.

The Indrapura dynasty was linked to several collateral royal and princely lines. The wife of one king, Tribhuvanadevi, introduced a cult for her grandmother Vrddhakula, the younger sister of an unnamed "king of kings" from Vishnupura. By marrying into the Indrapura dynasty, Tribhuvanadevi's family became influential, with her three brothers serving as court ministers. They built a temple in Vishnupura for Vrddhakula, which became the Buddhist monastery Vrddhalokiteshvara (a female form of Avalokiteshvara). Over time, the ancestor cult took on a territorial character, securing land ownership rights. Worship of earth deities merged with reverence for royal ancestors, who patronized dynasties from specific regions.

When a dynasty ended, its "divine" patron ancestors disappeared from Cham inscriptions, suggesting they were no longer worshipped, with no new sanctuaries or offerings dedicated to them. Another feature of the Cham ancestor cult was inscriptions cursing those who destroyed or neglected a sanctuary, often targeting the ancestors and descendants of violators.

=== Funerary cult ===
According to Chinese sources, Cham funerary practices varied by region. Cremation was not universal and applied mainly to Brahmins, kshatriyas, and court nobles, while commoners and children were buried. Some Cham inscriptions mention the ritual of sati — burning a king's wives on his funeral pyre and casting their remains into the sea—but this was extremely rare.

The bodies of deceased elites were displayed for several days for mourning, with family members shaving their heads in grief. After cremation, the frontal bone of the skull was broken into nine pieces, stored in a precious metal casket (klong), and kept by the family for ancestor worship rituals ("kut worship"). Men's klongs were placed in the eastern part of the house, and women's in the western part.

== Bibliography ==
=== In Russian ===
- Brook, Solomon Ilich (1981). Население мира. Этно-демографический справочник [The World's Population: Ethno-Demographic Handbook]. Москва: Наука.
- Deopik, D. V.; Kuznetsov, A. I. (1983). Малые народы Индокитая [Small Peoples of Indochina]. Москва: Главная редакция восточной литературы издательства «Наука».
- Cao, The Chinh (1994). Традиционное жилище народов плато Тэйнгуен [Traditional Housing of the Peoples of the Tay Nguyen Plateau]. Москва: Институт этнологии и антропологии имени Н. Н. Миклухо-Маклая РАН.
- Chesnov, Yan Veniaminovich (1976). Историческая этнография стран Индокитая [Historical Ethnography of Indochina Countries]. Москва: Главная редакция восточной литературы издательства «Наука».
- Schweyer, Anne-Valérie (2014). Древний Вьетнам [Ancient Vietnam]. Москва: Вече. ISBN 978-5-9533-3838-7.
- Shpazhnikov, G. A. (1980). Религии стран Юго-Восточной Азии [Religions of Southeast Asian Countries]. Москва: Главная редакция восточной литературы издательства «Наука».

=== In English ===
- Boomgaard, Peter (2007). Southeast Asia: An Environmental History. Santa Barbara, California: ABC-CLIO. ISBN 978-1-85109-419-6.
- Di Giovine, Michael A. (2008). The Heritage-scape: UNESCO, World Heritage, and Tourism. Lanham, Maryland: Lexington Books. ISBN 978-0-7391-1434-6.
- Hardy, Andrew David; Cucarzi, Mauro; Zolese, Patrizia (2009). Champa and the Archaeology of Mỹ Sơn (Vietnam). Singapore: NUS Press (National University of Singapore). ISBN 978-9971-69-451-7.
- Higham, Charles (2014). Encyclopedia of Ancient Asian Civilizations. New York City: Infobase Publishing. ISBN 978-0-8160-4640-9.
- Linh, Mai Bui Dieu (2022). "Religious Identity and Contemporary Ritual Practices of the Cham Ahiér in Vietnam". Extrême-Orient, Extrême-Occident. 45: 77–118. doi:10.4000/extremeorient.2723. ISSN 0754-5010.
- Lockhart, Bruce; Phuong, Tran Ky (2011). The Cham of Vietnam: History, Society and Art. Singapore: NUS Press (National University of Singapore). ISBN 978-9971-69-459-3.
- Minahan, James (2012). Ethnic Groups of South Asia and the Pacific: An Encyclopedia. Santa Barbara, California: ABC-CLIO. ISBN 978-1-59884-659-1.
- Minahan, James (2002). Encyclopedia of the Stateless Nations: Ethnic and National Groups Around the World. Volume I A—C. Santa Barbara, California: ABC-CLIO. ISBN 0-313-32109-4.
- Sharma, Gitesh (2009). Traces of Indian Culture in Vietnam. New Delhi, India: Rajkamal Prakashan Group. ISBN 978-81-905401-4-8.
- Tadgell, Christopher (2015). The East: Buddhists, Hindus and the Sons of Heaven. Abingdon-on-Thames: Routledge. ISBN 978-0-415-40752-6.
- Tucker, Spencer C. (2011). The Encyclopedia of the Vietnam War: A Political, Social, and Military History. Second Edition. Santa Barbara, California: ABC-CLIO. ISBN 978-1-85109-961-0.
- Tucker, Spencer C. (1999). Vietnam. Lexington, Kentucky: University Press of Kentucky. ISBN 0-8131-2121-3.
- West, Barbara A. (2010). Encyclopedia of the Peoples of Asia and Oceania. New York City: Infobase Publishing. ISBN 978-0-8160-7109-8.

=== In French ===
- Hubert, Jean-Francois (2013). L'Art du Champa [The Art of Champa]. Parkstone Press International. ISBN 978-1-78042-834-5.
