= Vikrantavarman I =

Vikrāntavarman I
- Raja-di-raja

King of Champa
- Reign: 653-686
- Coronation: 653
- Predecessor: Daughter of Kandarpadharma
- Successor: Naravāhanavarman
- Born: Unknown; Simhapura, Champa
- Died: 686; Simhapura
- Consort: Daughter of Kandarpadharma
- Issue: Vikrantavarman II
Names
- Śrī Prakāśadharma
Regnal name
- Vikrāntavarman
- Dynasty: Simhapura dynasty
- Father: Jagaddharma
- Mother: Sarväpi
- Religion: Hinduism, Buddhism

Vikrāntavarman I or Prakāśadharma (?–686 AD), was a king of Champa from the Gangaraja (Simhapura) dynasty, modern-day Central Vietnam, reigning from 653 to 686. His original name was Prakāśadharma, but he took the appellation Vikrāntavarman when he was crowned in 653. He was the son of Prince Jagaddharma, the grandson of Kandarpadharma, and Princess Sarväpi, daughter of king Isanavarman I of Zhenla. He sent embassies to the court of Emperor Gaozong of Tang in 653, 654, 669, and 670, which he was known as Zhu Ghedi (諸葛地) and Bojiashebamo (鉢伽舍跋摩, Late Middle Chinese: pɑt-kaɨ/kɛ:-ɕia’/ɕiaʰ-bɑt-mɑ), as recorded in the New Book of Tang. He was known for expanding the Champa kingdom to the south, uniting the realm under one dynasty.

During the reign of Vikrantavarman I, also known as Prakāśādharma, the title of the king of Champa changed from "great king" (maharaja) to "king of kings" (raja-di-raja).

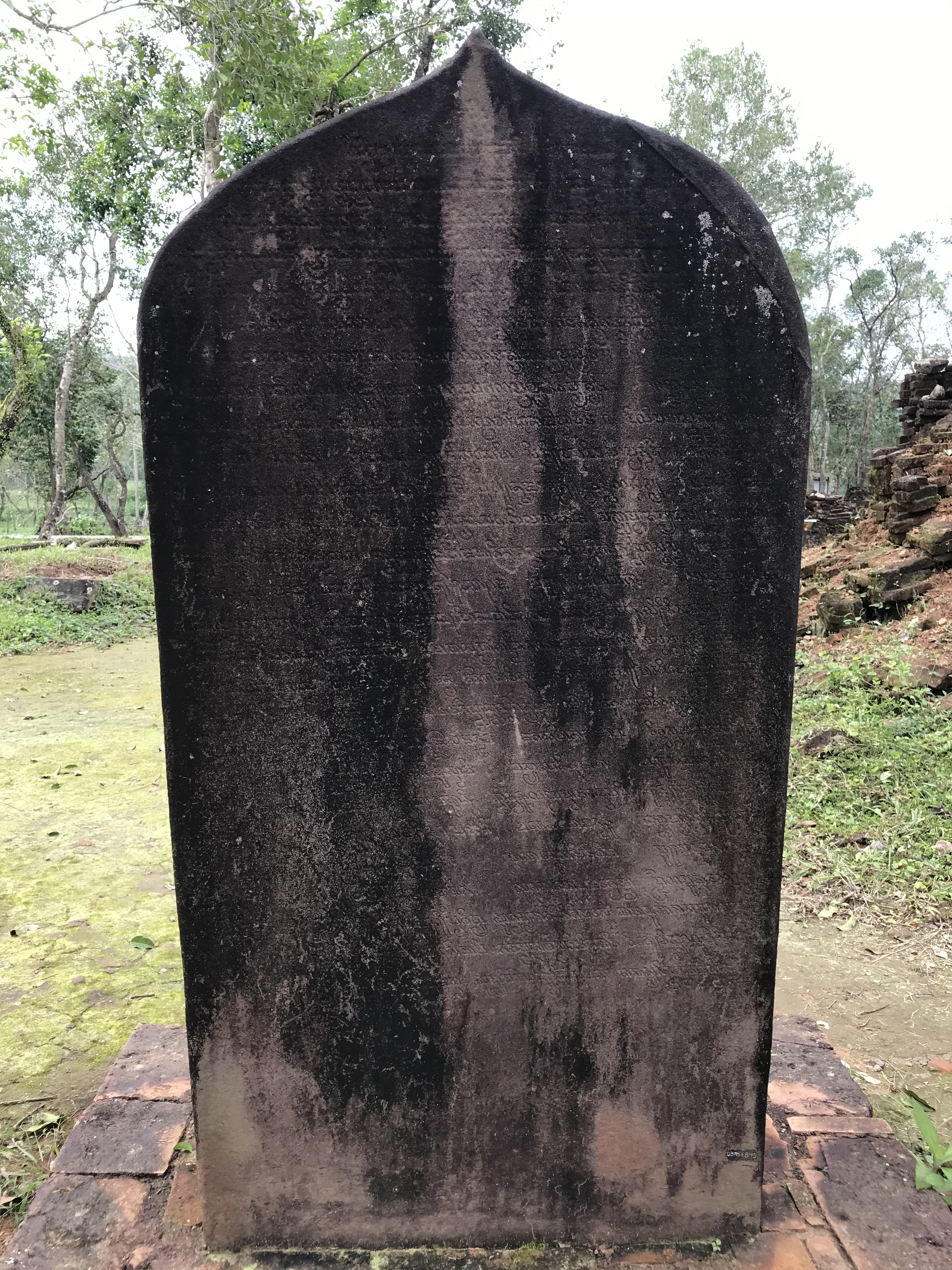
Stele at Temple E of Mỹ Sơn, erected by King Prakāśadharman-Vikrantavarman in 657 AD.

== Expansion of Champa ==
Prakāśadharma conducted a series of military campaigns against other chiefdoms in the south. By 658 AD it is apparent that Champa's territory had already established to near modern-day Ninh Hòa city in Khánh Hòa.

The illustrious conqueror, king of Campā, of great wisdom, called Śrī Prakāśadharman, has established Amareśa, the great...

== Administration ==
Prakāśadharma introduced and implemented the territorial division unit of viṣayas (district) for the first time. There were at least two known viṣayas: Caum and Midit.

It was highly likely that Prakāśadharma spent a portion of his courtier and vacational times in the city of Viṣṇupura (at present day Cổ Thành, Quảng Trị, east of the Thạch Hãn River). Vaishnavism in Champa can only be found in Quang Tri.

== Envoys to Tang Empire ==
The New Book of Tang recorded a king of Lam Ap named Zhu Ghede (Chinese: 諸葛地, pinyin: Zhū Gěde), while in the Tang Huiyao, Zhu Ghede's actual name was transcribed as Bojiashebamo (Chinese: 鉢伽舍跋摩; Late Middle Chinese: *pɑt-kaɨ/kɛ:-ɕia’/ɕiaʰ-bɑt-mɑ) reigning from 653 to 687, which is often attributed to the profile of Prakāśadharma. Prakāśadharma offered the Tang court an elephant on May 9, 653. He sent four more times envoys to the Tang court in May 654, February 657, August 669, and 670.

However, some palaeographists remain skeptical that a straightforward identification of the data of medieval Chinese sources about the kingdom of Lam Ap/Linyi with epigraphic evidence of the Thu Bon River Valley is plausible.

== Constructing temples ==
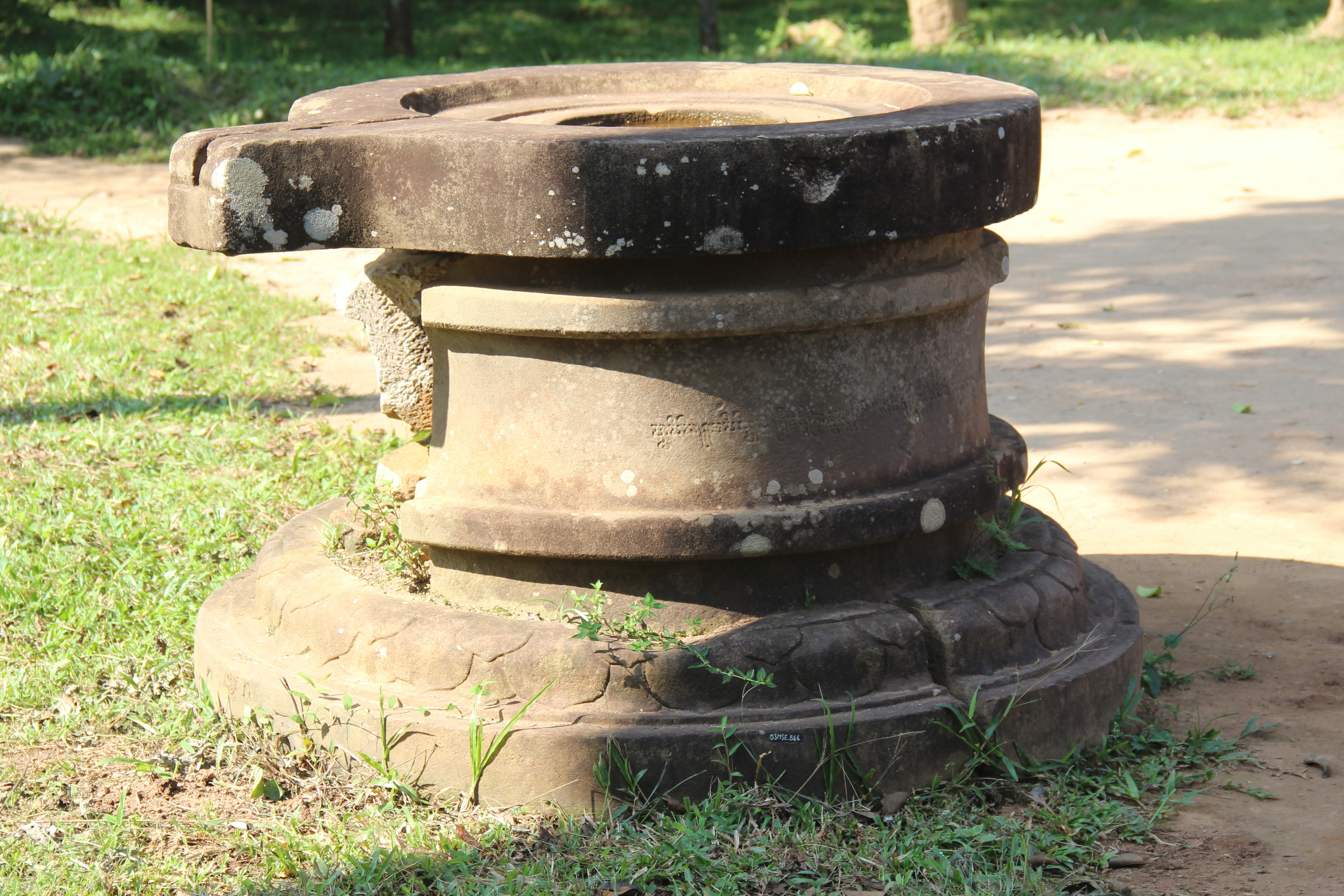
Inscription of Prakasadharma's son Vikrantavarman II on a pedestal at My Son.

During his reign, Vikrantavarman built numerous temples at Mỹ Sơn, dedicating particularly heavily to Śiva.

At these temples, he desired the worship of Kandarpadharma (the father of his grandfather's mother), Śiva's friend Ekākṣapiṅgalā? Kuvera at Mỹ Sơn, Amareśa; and a golden portrait of Śiva.

He named for his beloved deity Kandarpapureśvara after his great-grandfather and king Kandarpadharma. Kandarpadharma was the father of Prakāśadharma's paternal grandmother. Jagaddharma was likely an alternative name for hitherto Bhadreśvaravarman (r. 650?-?). When Prabhasadharma's male descendants were put to death by a minister, Jagaddharma, one of his nephew who had escaped, traveling to the Khmer city Bhavapura (Sambor Prei Kuk) and then got married with Queen Śarvānī, daughter of Zhenla king Isanavarman, and gave birth to Prakāśadharma.

Many pedestals, or kosas, were erected for his devotions to Śiva and Vishnu. Records of Prakāśadharma's writings indicate his knowledge of cosmopolitan Sanskrit learning and Indian philosophy.

== Succession ==
Initially, scholars thought that there was a single Vikrantavarman who ruled over Champa for 83 years, from 658 to 741. However, the existence of two kings named Vikrantavarman was subsequently discovered. Chinese documents reported that Prakāśadharma (Vikrantavarman I) had died in 686 and was succeeded by a son and namesake, Vikrantavarman II (r. ?-741, Jianduodamo). According to these Chinese annals, Prakāśadharma was succeeded by Vikrantavarman II. However, recent research shows indications that there was a king called Naravāhanavarman, who ruled briefly between Prakāśadharma and Vikrantavarman II.

== Bibliography ==
- Golzio, Karl-Heinz (2004), Inscriptions of Campā based on the editions and translations of Abel Bergaigne, Étienne Aymonier, Louis Finot, Édouard Huber and other French scholars and of the work of R. C. Majumdar. Newly presented, with minor corrections of texts and translations, together with calculations of given dates, Shaker Verlag
- Goodall, Dominic; Griffiths, Arlo (2013). "Études du Corpus des inscriptions du Campā. V. The Short Foundation Inscriptions of Prakāśadharman-Vikrāntavarman, King of Campā" (PDF). Indo-Iranian Journal. 56 (3–4): 419–440. doi:10.1163/15728536-13560307.
- Majumdar, R. C. (1927), Champā: History and Culture of an Indian Colonial Kingdom in the Far East, 2nd-16th Century AD, book III, Gyan Publishing House

| Preceded by Daughter of Kandarpadharma ?–653 | King of Champa; 653–686 | Succeeded by Naravahanavarman 686–? |
