= En Magan =

En Magan (transl. My son) is the title of two Indian Tamil-language films:

- En Magan (1945 film), a 1945 film directed by R. S. Mani
- En Magan (1974 film), a 1974 film directed by C. V. Rajendran

== See also ==
- My Son (disambiguation)
- Em Magan, a 2006 Indian Tamil family drama film by Thirumurugana
- En Magal, a 1954 Indian Tamil film
- En Magan Magizhvan a 2017 Indian Tamil film
