= Vikrantavarman II =

Vikrāntavarman II
- maharajadhiraja
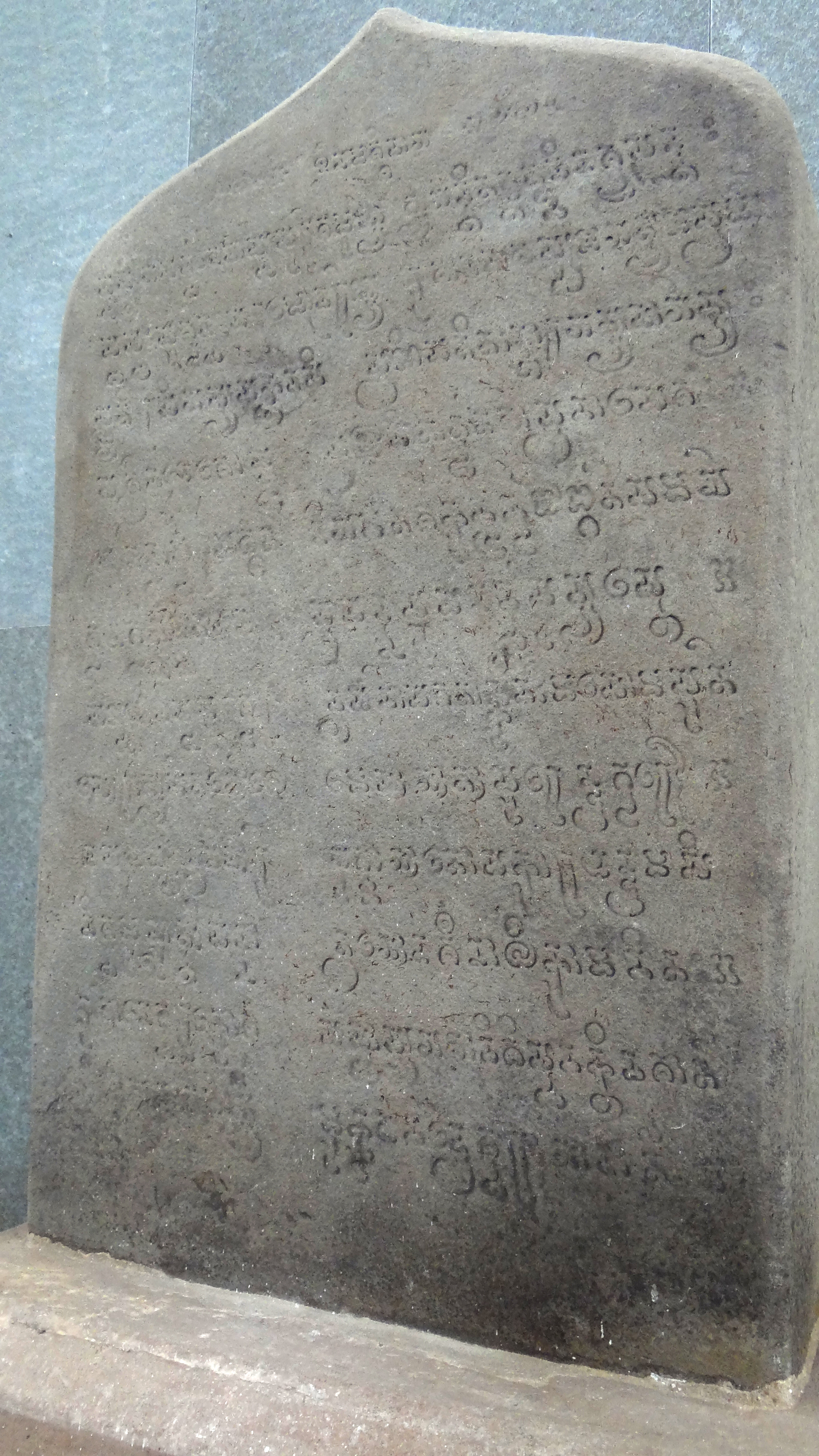
- Stelae of Vikrantavarman II dates 19 May 687 AD from Mỹ Sơn

King of Champa
- Reign: 687-741
- Coronation: 687
- Predecessor: Naravahanavarman
- Successor: Lútuóluó
- Born: Unknown; Simhapura, Champa
- Died: 741; Simhapura
Names
- Śrī Vikrāntavarman
- House: Fourth dynasty (Simhapura dynasty)
- Father: Vikrantavarman I
- Religion: Hinduism, Buddhism

Vikrāntavarman II (?–741 AD), was the seventh king of the Fourth dynasty of Champa, modern-day Central Vietnam, reigned from 686 to 741. He was the son of king Vikrantavarman I. He was identified as Jianduodamo (Chinese: 建多达摩, Middle Chinese: *kɨanh-tɑ-dɑt-mɑ) in the medieval Chinese annals of the New Book of Tang. In his kośa for the lingam of Vāmeśvara in Mỹ Sơn, Vikrantavarman II is venerated as lion among kings.

An inscription on a stele dated 19 May 687 in Mỹ Sơn is attributed to his coronation. That same day he also installed a sheath and a crown for two of his beloved gods, Īśānesvara and Bhadreśvara, manifest in the earth in the form of lingas.

== Bibliography ==
- Majumdar, R. C. (1927), Champā: History and Culture of an Indian Colonial Kingdom in the Far East, 2nd-16th Century AD, book III, Gyan Publishing House
- Golzio, Karl-Heinz (2004), Inscriptions of Campā based on the editions and translations of Abel Bergaigne, Étienne Aymonier, Louis Finot, Édouard Huber and other French scholars and of the work of R. C. Majumdar. Newly presented, with minor corrections of texts and translations, together with calculations of given dates, Shaker Verlag

Preceded by Naravahanavarman ?–?	King of Champa ?–741	Succeeded by Lútuóluó 741–?
