= My Son =

My Son may refer to:

== Mỹ Sơn ==
- Mỹ Sơn archaeological site, Thu Bồn commune, Da Nang city, Vietnam
- Mỹ Sơn, Ninh Son district, Khánh Hòa province (formerly Ninh Thuận province), Vietnam

== My Son ==
- My Son (1925 film), an American silent film directed by Edwin Carewe
- My Son (1928 film), a Soviet film directed by Yevgeni Chervyakov
- My Sons, a 1991 Japanese film
- My Son (2007 film), a South Korean film directed by Jang Jin
- My Son (2017 film), a French thriller directed by Christian Carion
  - My Son (2021 Christian Carion film), an English-language remake of the 2017 film, also directed by Christian Carion
- My Son (2021 German film), a drama film
- "My Son" (song), a 1968 song by Jan Howard

== See also ==
- En Magan (disambiguation) (lit. 'My Son'), various Indian films
