= Prabhasadharma =

King of Champa (b. ?, d. 645)

Jaya Prabhasadharmavarman (?–645 CE) was the King of Champa.

He was the son of King Kandarpadharma. He sent embassies to the court of Emperor Gaozong of Tang in 640 and 642. He was known as Fan Zhenlong (范鎮龍), as recorded in the New Book of Tang. His reign ended in 645 when he was assassinated by his minister.

Preceded by Kandarpadharma 629–?	King of Champa ?–645	Succeeded by Bhadresvaravarman 645–?
