= Kandarpadharma =

King of Champa

- King of Campādeśa; King of Lâm Ấp (Bestowed by the Tang dynasty)
- Reign: 629–640 AD
- Coronation: 629 AD
- Predecessor: Sambhuvarman
- Successor: Prabhasadharma
- Born: ? ?
- Died: 640
- Dynasty: Simhapura dynasty (Gangeśvara)
- Father: Sambhuvarman
- Mother: ?

Kandarpadharma was the King of the Simhapura dynasty of Champa. He ruled from 629 to an unknown date, when he was succeeded by his son, King Prabhasadharma. His rule was peaceful and he sent two missions to China in 630 and 631.

Kandarpadharma was the first king in history officially to offer the title King of Champa: campāpr̥thivībhuj (lord of the land of Champa) and śrī campeśvara (Lord of the Cham) of Campādeśa (the country of the Cham) and Campāpura (the cities/state of Champa). Kandarpadharma was a member of Simhapura dynasty/Gangeśvara dynasty founded by Gangaraja.

Preceded by Sambhuvarman ?–629	King of Champa; 629–?	Succeeded by Prabhasadharma ?–645
