= History of Champa =

The history of Champa begins in prehistory with the migration of the ancestors of the Cham people to mainland Southeast Asia and the founding of their Indianized maritime kingdom based in what is now central Vietnam in the early centuries AD, and ends when the final vestiges of the kingdom were annexed and absorbed by Vietnam in 1832.

== Abstract ==
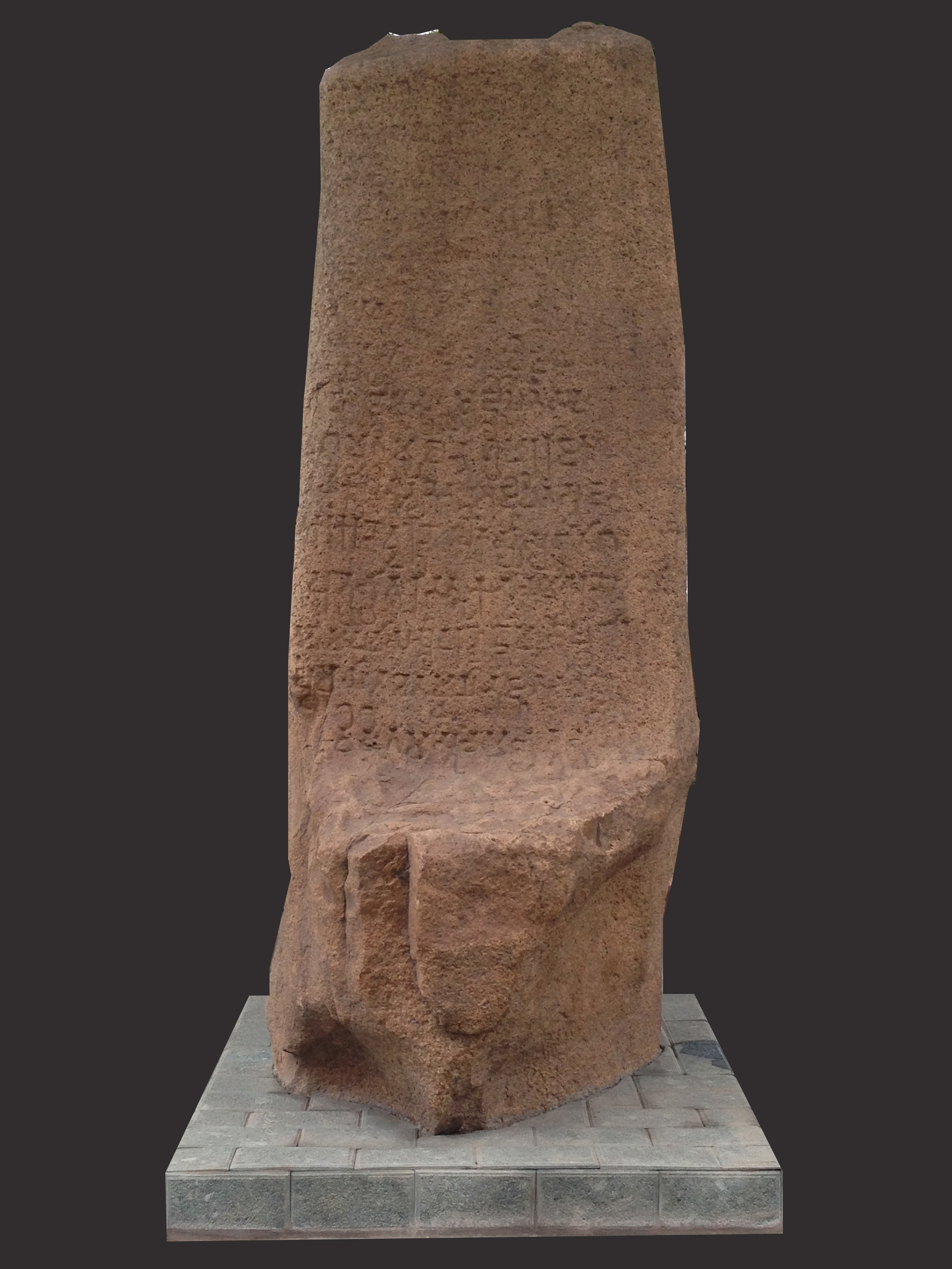
The Vo Canh Stele is the oldest Sanskrit inscription ever found in Southeast Asia, 2nd or 3rd century CE

One theory holds that the people of Champa were descended from settlers who reached the Southeast Asian mainland from Borneo about the time of the Sa Huỳnh culture, though genetic evidence points to exchanges with India. Sa Huỳnh sites are rich in iron artifacts, by contrast with the Đông Sơn culture sites found in northern Vietnam and elsewhere in mainland Southeast Asia, where bronze artifacts are dominant. The Cham language is part of the Austronesian family. According to one study, Cham is related most closely to modern Acehnese.

== Founding legend ==
=== Lady Po Nagar ===
Cham tradition says that the founder of the Cham state was Lady Po Nagar. She hailed from Khánh Hòa Province, in a peasant family in the mountains of Dai An. Spirits assisted her when she drifted on a piece of sandalwood to China, where she married a Chinese crown prince, the son of the Emperor of China, with whom she had two children. She then became Queen of Champa. When she returned to Champa to visit her family, the Prince refused to let her go, but she flung the sandalwood into the ocean, disappeared with her children and reappeared at Nha Trang to her family. When the Chinese prince tried to follow her back to Nha Trang, she was furious and turned him and his fleet into stone.

=== Hồ Tôn Tinh ===
According to some Vietnamese textbooks, the kingdom Hồ Tôn Tinh existed around the same time with the mythical Hồng Bàng dynasty and was believed to be the first Cham kingdom.

Part of its history was mentioned in the 14th-century Lĩnh Nam chích quái, with "The story of Dạ Xoa" (Vietnamese: Truyện Dạ Xoa):

In ancient time, outside of Nanyue and Âu Lạc, there was another country named Diệu Nghiêm, its ruler was Dạ Xoa (also known as King Trường Minh or Ten-Head King). The north of this country bordered Hồ Tôn Tinh kingdom, the crown prince of Hồ Tôn Tinh was Vi Tư, whose wife was Bạch Tịnh, known for her unique beauty. King Dạ Xoa was excited about this, so he led an army, attacked Hồ Tôn Tinh, and successfully kidnapped princess Bạch Tinh. Vi Tư, with anger, brought an army of monkeys, razed mountains and seas into plains, destroyed Diệu Nghiêm, killed Dạ Xoa, and escorted Bạch Tinh backed home.

== The Sa Huỳnh culture ==
The Sa Huỳnh culture was a late prehistoric metal age society on the central coast of Viet Nam. In 1909, urns containing cremated remains and grave goods were discovered at Thanh Duc, near Sa Huỳnh, a coastal village located south of Da Nang. Since then, many more burials have been found, from Huế to the Đồng Nai river delta. The jar burials contain bronze mirrors, coins, bells, bracelets, axes and spearheads, iron spearheads, knives and sickles, and beads made of gold, glass, carnelian, agate and nephrite. Radiocarbon dating of the Sa Huỳnh culture remains range from 400 BC to the first or second century AD. The Sa Huỳnh exchanged items along maritime trade routes with Taiwan and the Philippines. "At present, the consensus of all evidence points to a relatively late intrusive settlement of this region by sea from Borneo, a move which stimulated the rise of Sa Huỳnh, and then the development of the Cham states."

Field research conducted in the Thu Bon River Valley by joint British-Italian-Japanese archaeologists from 1999 to 2003 concludes that by the early centuries AD, late Sa Huynh settlements had developed into semiurbanized riverine and coastal port-cities, and ancient citadels such as Trà Kiệu and Gò Cấm might have become important trading hubs during the transition from late Sahuynhian (Proto-Chamic) culture to proto-Cham. By the third century AD, proto-Cham centers apparently had moved away from the sand dunes of the coast to further inland plains between rivers to avoid hostile conditions; in addition to the growth of fortified settlements, urbanization, trade, and expansion of rice cultivating communities along those rivers centuries afterwards, along with the improvement of road networks and overland communications, ultimately resulting in the emergence of more centralized state to be formed in the eight and ninth centuries.

== Initial kingdoms ==
Ancient Champa–Central Vietnam is said, during the regency of Duke of Zhou (1042–1035 BC), there was a tribe called Yuèshāng 越裳 (then Rinan) brought two black pheasants and one albino to the court of the Zhou dynasty, presented as tributes. The Nanyue kingdom (204–111 BC) based from present-day Guangzhou, was founded by Zhao Tuo, a former Chinese general of Qin Shihuangdi. Nanyue projected its power into present-day northern Vietnam, which eventually then was becoming the southernmost parts of Nanyue. The region was annexed by the Han emperor Wudi in 111 BC, who incorporated those territories corresponding to modern-day north and central Vietnam into the Han Empire. Central Vietnam from south of Ngang Pass in Hà Tĩnh then became known as Rinan (日南) province, meaning "south of the sun."

To the Chinese, the country of Champa was known as 林邑 Linyi in Mandarin and Lam Yap in Cantonese and to the Vietnamese, Lâm Ấp (which is the Sino-Vietnamese pronunciation of 林邑). According to Chinese texts, in 192 AD, a revolt erupted in Rinan led by Khu Liên (區連 Qū Lián), son of a local official, killing the Han magistrate in Xianglin (象林 Xiànglín in Chinese or Tượng Lâm in Vietnamese) county (modern-day Thừa Thiên Huế province). Khu Liên then established a kingdom known to the Chinese as Lâm Ấp or Linyi (Chinese: 林邑; Early Middle Chinese: *lim-ʔip). Over the next several centuries, Chinese forces made repeated unsuccessful attempts to retake the region.

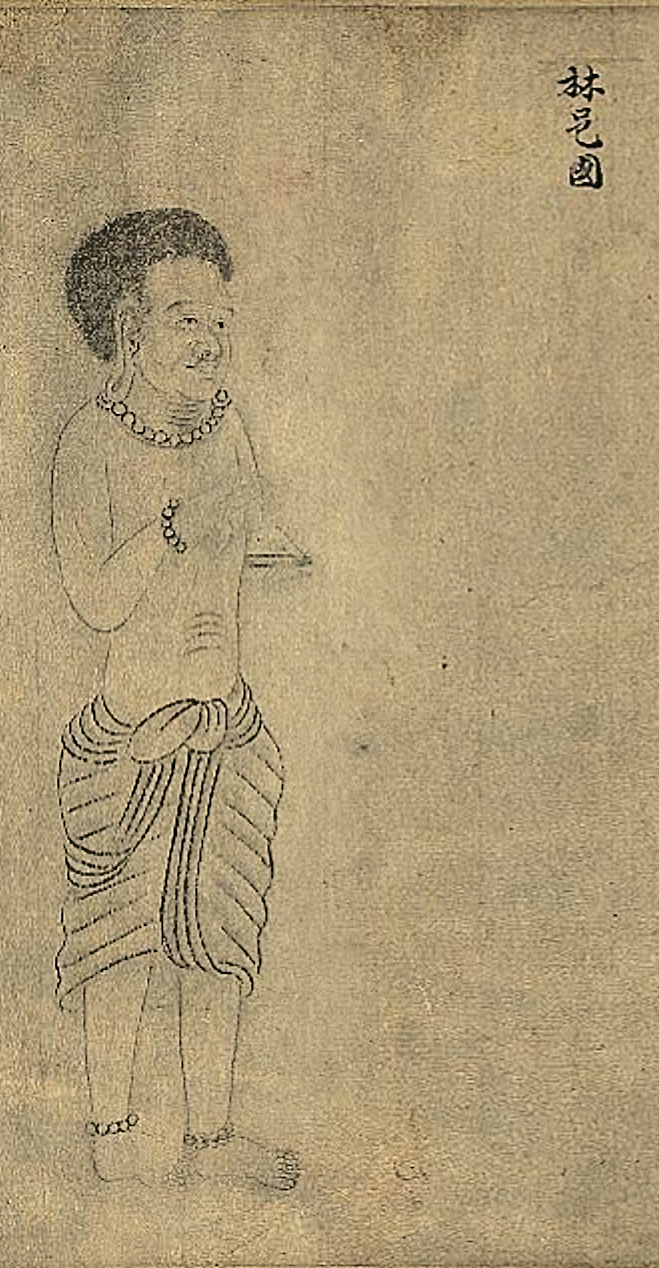
Envoy of Champa (林邑國) to the Liang dynasty. Part of "Entrance of the Foreign Visitors of Emperor Yuan of Liang" (梁元帝番客入朝圖) made by the painter Gu Deqian (顧德謙) of the Southern Tang dynasty (937–976 CE)

From its neighbor Funan to the west, Lâm Ấp soon came under the influence of Indian civilization. Scholars locate the historical beginnings of Champa in the 4th century, when the process of Indianization was well underway. It was in this period that the Cham people began to create stone inscriptions in both Sanskrit and in their own language, for which they created a unique script. One such Sanskrit inscription, the Vo Canh stele Pallava Grantha inscription hails from the early Cham territory of Kauthara, and establishes the descendant of the local Hindu king related to the Funan kingdom, Sri Mara. He is identified with both Champa founder Khu Liên and Fan Shih-man of Funan.

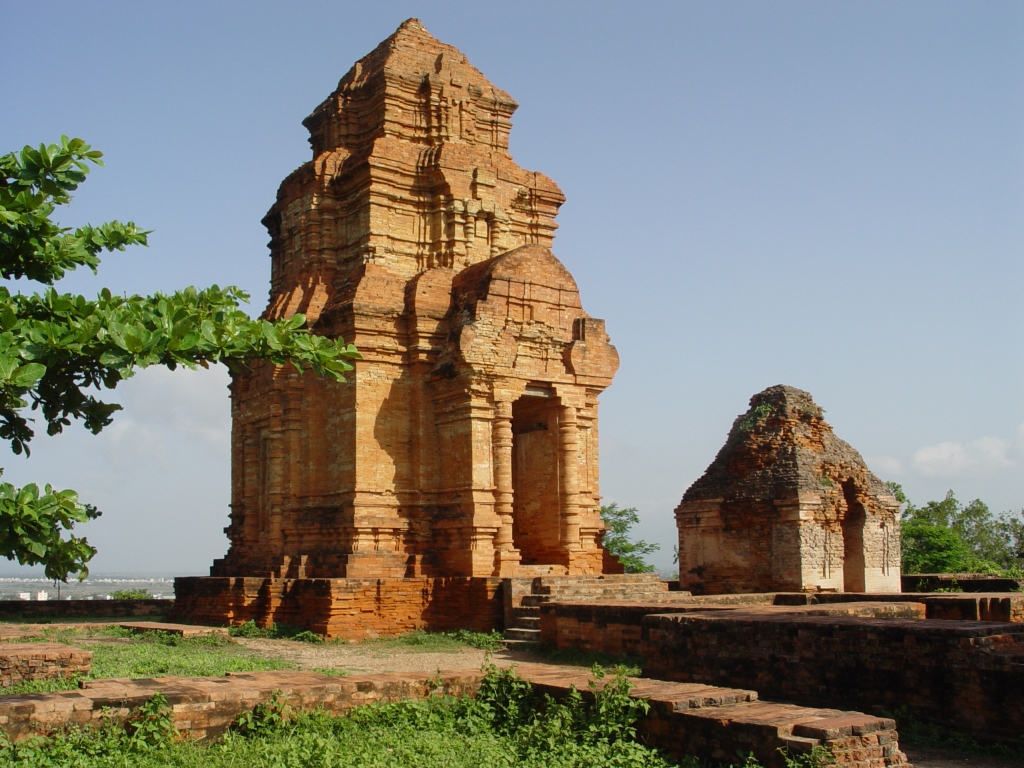
The towers of Po Sa Nu (Pho Hai) near Phan Thiết may be the oldest extant Cham buildings. In style, they exhibit the influence of pre-Angkorian Cambodia.

The Book of Jin has some records about Lam Ap during the 3rd to 5th centuries. Fan Wen (范文) became the king in 336. He attacked and annexed Daqijie, Xiaoqijie, Ship, Xulang, Qudu, Ganlu, and Fudan. Fan Wen sent a message and paid tribute to the Chinese Emperor, and the message was "written in barbarian characters". Lam Ap sometimes maintained the tributary status and sometimes was hostile to the Jin dynasty, and the Commandery of Rinan (日南, Chinese: Rinan, Vietnamese: Nhật Nam) was frequently under attack from Lam Ap.

Archaeological excavations at Tra Kieu (Simhapura), an early Lam Ap/Champa site, show that the common assumption of Lam Ap as a merely "Indianized" polity is rather irrational and fundamentally misunderstanding. Instead, evidence gathered from excavations displays a fascinating, dynamic history of the early stages of formation of the Cham civilization, with artifacts reflect cross global influence and trade connections between early Champa with ancient Eurasian powers such as the Han Empire, the Gupta Empire, the South Indian Pallava dynasty, and the Mediterranean.

The first king acknowledged in the inscriptions is Bhadravarman, who reigned from 380 to 413. At Mỹ Sơn, King Bhadravarman established a linga called Bhadresvara, whose name was a combination of the king's own name and that of the Hindu god of gods Shiva. The worship of the original god-king under the name Bhadresvara and other names continued through the centuries that followed. Moreover, Bhadravarman's third inscription (C. 174, c. 4th–5th century AD) at Tra Kieu, which renders Old Cham, is the oldest surviving text of any Southeast Asian language. The authorities of king Bhadravarman might have spanned from nowadays Quảng Nam to Chợ Dinh, Phú Yên, near the Đà Rằng river.

Some historians doubt that the Cham of medieval time were direct descendants from the early state of what the Chinese called Lâm Ấp/Linyi which encompassed the present-day areas north of Hải Vân Pass to the Ngang Pass. Another significant issue that historians also concern is the Champa unitary theory argued by early scholarship who believed that there was only one single kingdom of early Champa and that was Lâm Ấp/Linyi recorded by the Chinese. Linyi left no textual information, while south of Linyi were the kingdoms of Xitu, Boliao, Quduqian, and dozens more kingdoms that their names had been lost to history. For example, William Southworth, hypothesizes that the emergence of Champa in the 6th century was the result of a gradual process of Chamic northward expansion from the Thu Bồn River valley to Thừa Thiên Huế and its periphery around the 5th to 6th century AD, though very faint. From 220 to 645, Chinese annals give almost the same title for rulers of Linyi: Fan 范 (Middle Chinese: *buam'), that may be connected with the Khmer title poñ found in seventh-century Khmer inscriptions. Michael Vickery proposes that the Linyi (Huế) of what Chinese historians had described, was not the actual Champa or Chamic at all. Instead, Linyi's demographics might have been predominantly Mon-Khmer, perhaps the Vieto-Katuic ethnolinguistic branch.

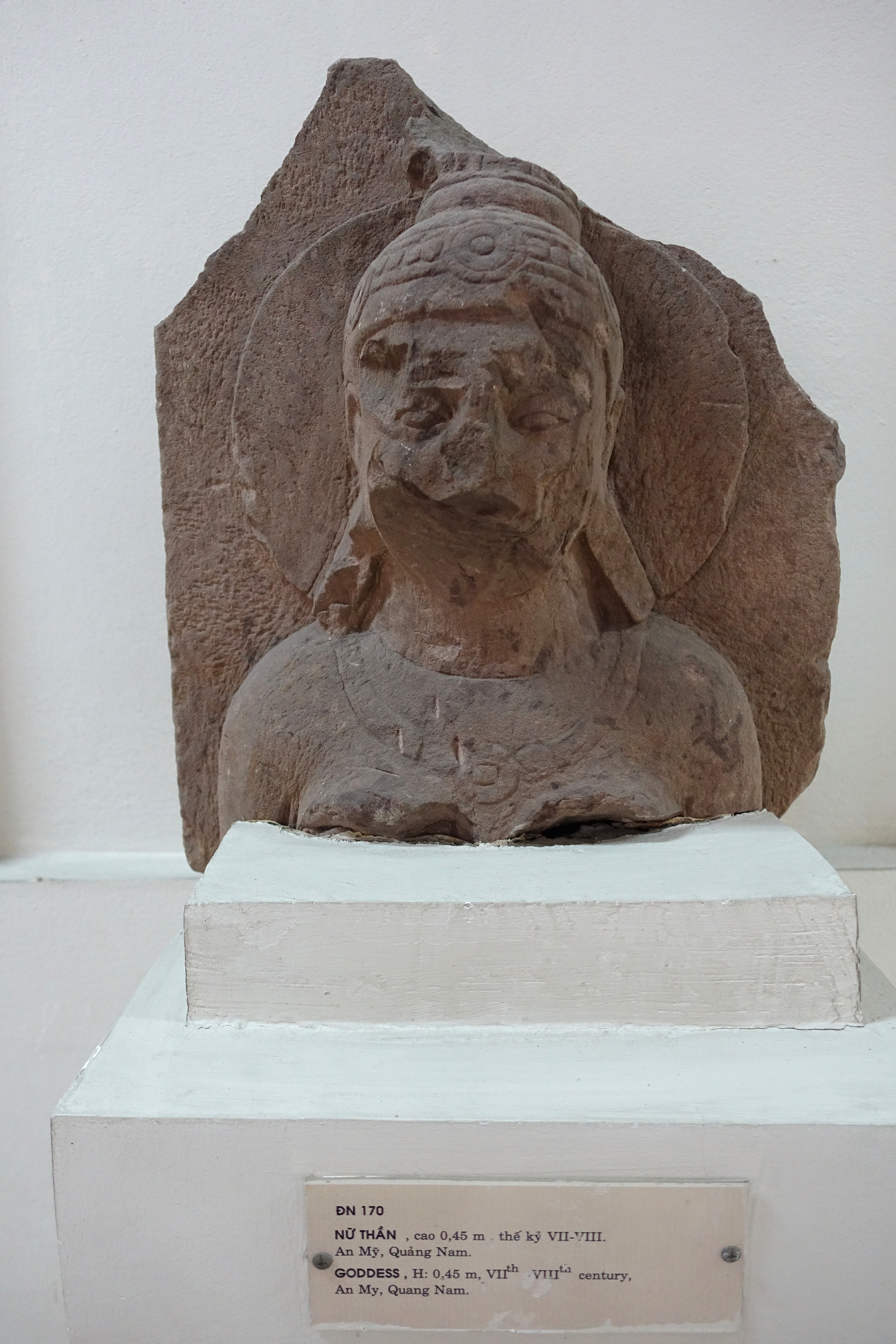
Sculpture of an unidentified female goddess from An My, Quang Nam, 7th-8th century AD.

Archaeologists also have discovered early 5th-century Cham sculptures showing different traits and styles per location, thus perhaps indicate the certainly existence of many different Proto-Cham kingdoms/settlements developed independently. Those archaic male and female sculptures and images, however, questioned by historians, whether they represent Indian Hindu gods, or could be purely local spirits and deities, revealing facets of early Cham religion and society. Some of the sculptures from Khanh Hoa, Phu Yen, Binh Dinh, and Quang Nam apparently share some similar elements with Gupta art of the 4th and 5th centuries.

The capital of Lâm Ấp at the time of Bhadravarman was the citadel of Simhapura, the "Lion City" at present-day Trà Kiệu, located along two rivers and had a wall eight miles in circumference. A Chinese writer described the people of Lâm Ấp as both warlike and musical, with "deep eyes, a high straight nose, and curly black hair."

According to Chinese records, Sambhuvarman (Fan Fan Tche) was crowned king of Lâm Ấp in 529. Inscriptions credit him with rehabilitating the temple to Bhadresvara after a fire. Sambhuvarman also sent delegations and tribute to China and unsuccessfully invaded what is now northern Vietnam. George Cœdès states that this was actually Rudravarman I, followed by his son Sambhuvarman; their combined reigns extended from 529 to 629. When the Vietnamese gained a brief independence under the Early Lý dynasty (544–602), King Lý Nam Đế sent his general, Pham Tu, to pacify the Chams after they raided southern border, in 543; the Chams were defeated.

In 605, general Liu Fang (劉方) of the Chinese Sui dynasty invaded Lâm Ấp, won a battle by luring the enemy war-elephants into an area booby-trapped with camouflaged pits, massacring the defeated troops, and captured the capital. Sambhuvarman rebuilt the capital and the Bhadravarman temple at Mỹ Sơn, then received Chenla King Mahendravarman's ambassador. In the 620s, the kings of Lâm Ấp sent delegations to the court of the recently established Tang dynasty and asked to become vassals of the Chinese court.

Chinese records report the death of the last king of Lâm Ấp in 756. Thereafter for a time, the Chinese referred to Champa as "Hoan Vuong" or "Huanwang". The earliest Chinese records using a name related to "Champa" are dated 877; however, such names had been in use by the Cham themselves since at least 629, and by the Khmer since at least 667. Some academics such as Anton Zakharov and Andrew Hardy recently have come to the conclusion that the Linyi of Chinese history texts and the Champa Kingdom from indigenous epigraphic sources might have nothing in common and are obscure, unrelated to each other.

At Mỹ Sơn, the name Campā occurs in the first time on an important Cham inscription code named C. 96 dating from metaphysically year 658 AD. Another undatable inscription from Dinh Thị, Thừa Thiên Huế mentions a king with titles cāmpeśvara ('"Lord of the Cham'") and śrī kandarppapureśvarāya ("Lord of the City of Kandarpapura of Love"), perhaps attribute to Kandarpadharma, the eldest son of Sambhuvarman. Correspondingly, Cambodian inscription K. 53 (written in Sanskrit) from Kdei Ang, Prey Veng recorded an envoy dispatched from the ruler of Champa (Cāmpeśvara) in 667 AD.

== Champa at its peak ==
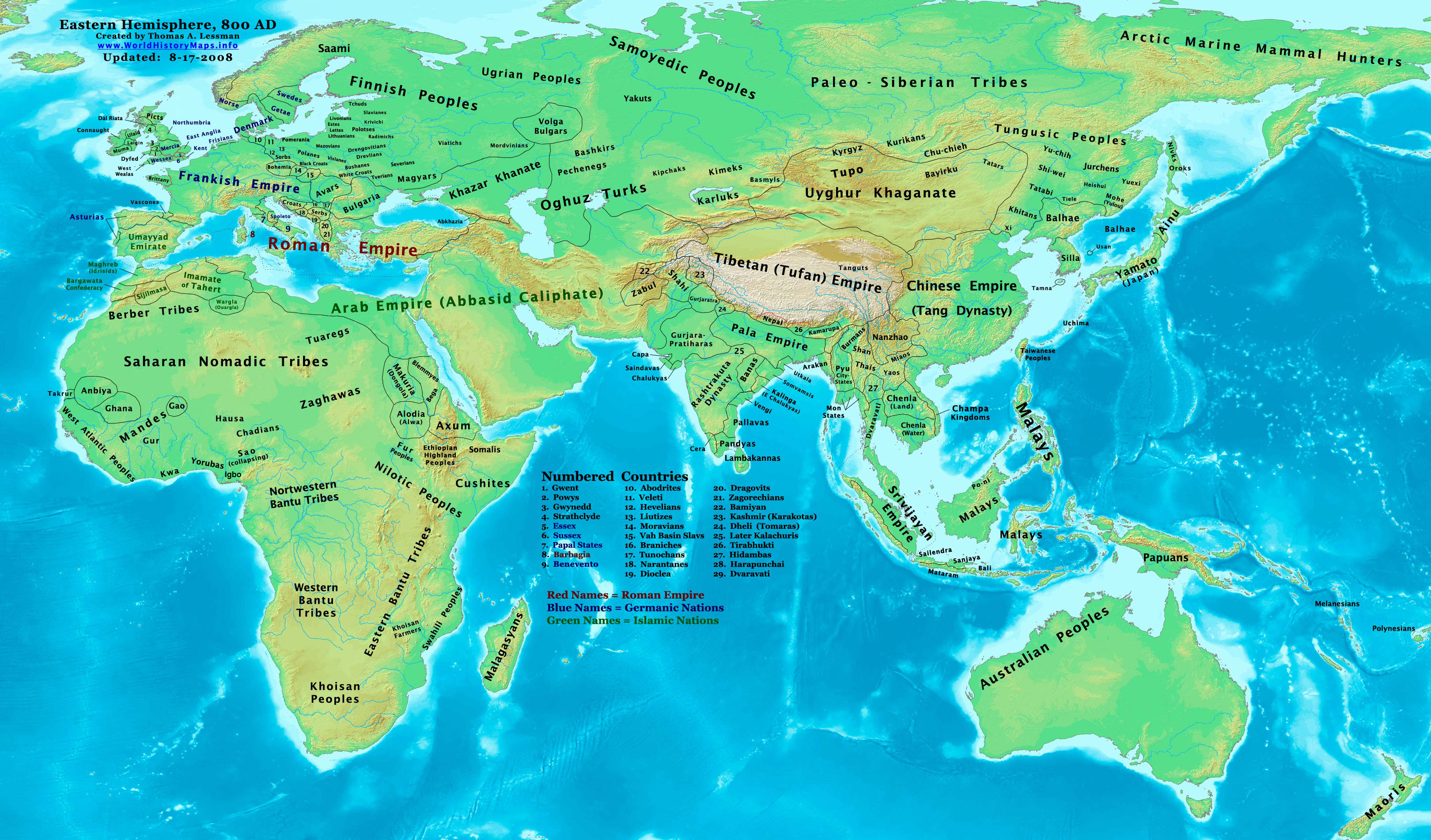
Asia in 800 AD, showing the Champa city-states and their neighbors

From the 7th to the 10th centuries, the Cham controlled the trade in spices and silk between China, India, the Indonesian islands, and the Abbasid empire in Baghdad. They supplemented their income from the trade routes not only by exporting ivory and aloe, but also by engaging in piracy and raiding.

=== Consolidation under Prakasadharma and the Simhapura dynasty ===
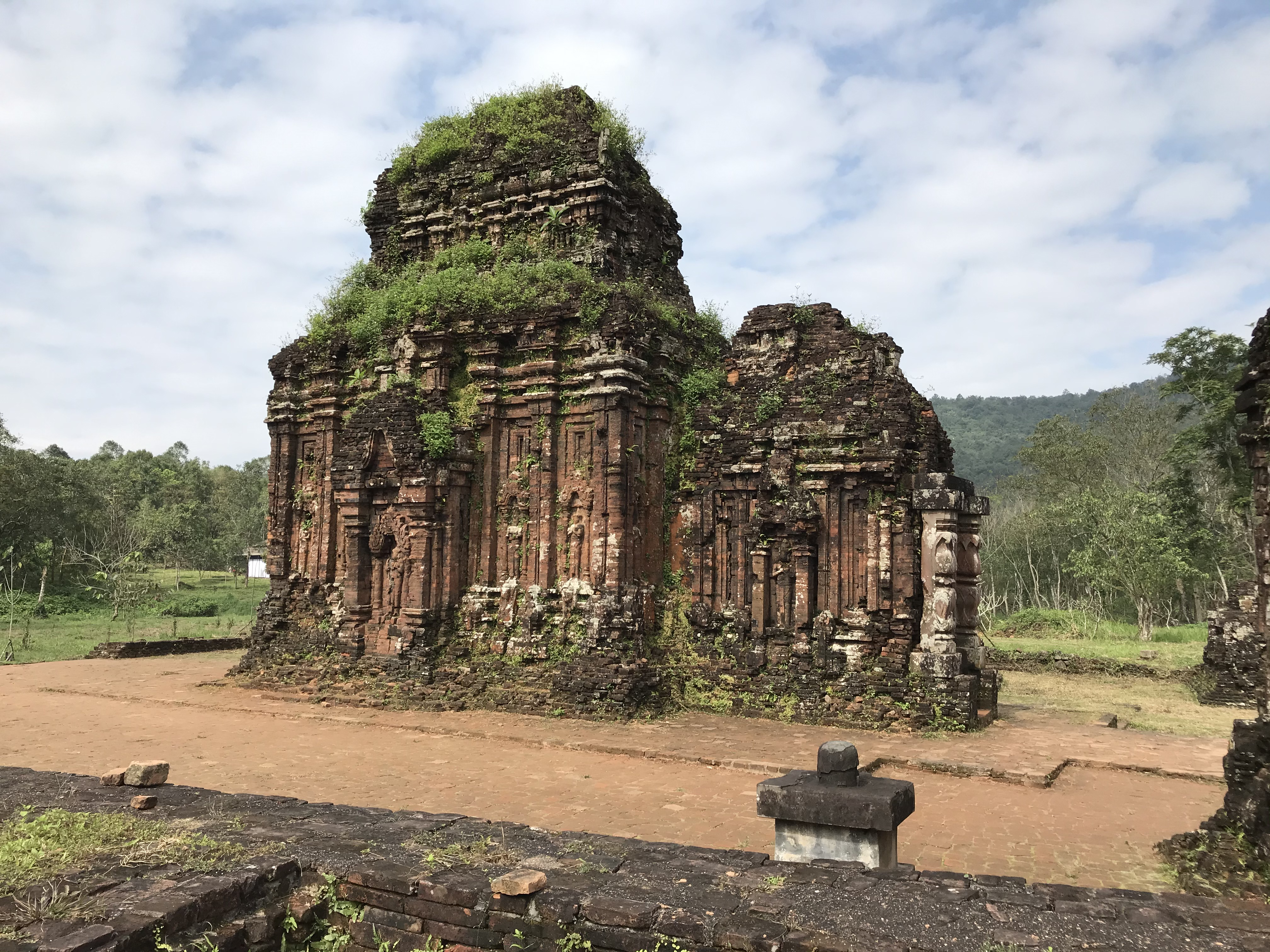
Ruins of the Mỹ Sơn Sanctuary

In 653, king Prakasadharman (r. 653–686) ascended the crown as Vikrantavarman I of Champa in Simhapura (Tra Kieu). He was a descendant of kings Gangaraja (r. 413 – ?) and Rudravarman I (r. 527–572). This lineage was known as the Gangaraja dynasty or the Simhapura dynasty. He embarked a series of campaigns to subdue other Chamic kingdoms in the south, and by 658 AD the kingdom of Champa (campādeśa) stretching from Quảng Bình province in the north to present-day Ninh Hòa city, Khánh Hòa province in the south, was unified under one ruler for the first time.

Prakāśadharma organized the kingdom into administrative units known as viṣaya (district. However, viṣaya also can be synonymous with dominion, kingdom, territory, region). At that time there were two known districts: Caum and Midit. Each of them had a handful number of koṣṭhāgāras – 'storage', could be understood as the source of stable income to upkeep the worship of three gods. They could be rice fields, storehouses, and less likely treasures. Prakāśadharma built numerous temples and religious foundations at Mỹ Sơn. One structure is amazing decorated was dedicated to the Ramayana's author Valmiki by the king, resembling a theme from the wedding of Sita in the Ramayana.

Prakāśadharma dispatched four diplomatic missions to the court of the Tang Empire in 653, 654, 669, and 670. Envoys and tributes were regularly sent to China by previous kings. The seventh century saw Champa or Linyi from the eyes of the Chinese, became the chief tributary state of the South, on a par with the Korean kingdoms of Kokuryo in the Northeast and Baekje in the East — though the latter was rivaled by Japan.

=== Religious foundations at Mỹ Sơn ===
By the second half of the 7th century, royal temples were beginning to appear at Mỹ Sơn. The dominant religious practice was that of the Hindu god Shiva, but temples were also dedicated to Vishnu. Scholars have called the architectural style of this period Mỹ Sơn E1, in reference to a particular edifice at Mỹ Sơn that is regarded as emblematic of the style. Important surviving works of art in this style include a pedestal for a linga that has come to be known as the Mỹ Sơn E1 Pedestal and a pediment depicting the birth of Brahma from a lotus issuing from the navel of the sleeping Vishnu.

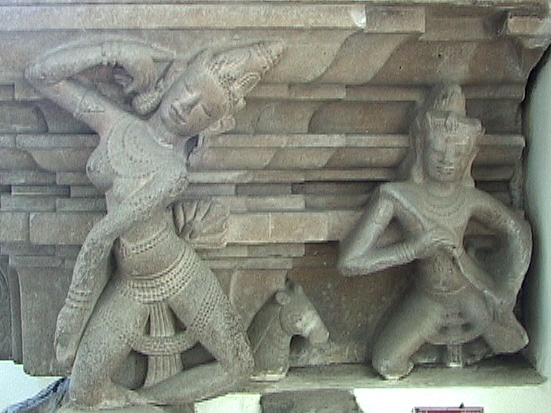
Stone pedestal of a temple with an Apsara dancer and a Gandharva musician (Trà Kiệu style)

In an important stone inscription dated 657, found at Mỹ Sơn, King Prakasadharma, who took on the name Vikrantavarman I at his coronation, claimed to be descended through his mother from the Brahman Kaundinya and the serpent princess Soma, the legendary ancestors of the Khmer of Cambodia. This inscription underlines the ethnic and cultural connection of Champa with the Khmer Empire, its perennial rival to the west. It also commemorates the king's dedication of a monument, probably a linga, to Shiva. Another inscription documents the king's almost mystical devotion to Shiva, "who is the source of the supreme end of life, difficult to attain; whose true nature is beyond the domain of thought and speech, yet whose image, identical with the universe, is manifested by his forms."

=== Temporary preeminence of Kauthara ===
In the 8th century, during the time when the Chinese knew the country as "Huanwang", the political center of Champa shifted temporarily from Mỹ Sơn southward to the regions of Panduranga and Kauthara, centered around the temple complex of Po Nagar near modern Nha Trang that was dedicated to the indigenous Earth goddess Yan Po Nagar. In 774, Navy from Java disembarked in Kauthara, burned the temple of Po Nagar, and carried off the image of Shiva. The Cham king Satyavarman (r. 770–787) pursued the invaders and defeated them in a naval battle. In 781, Satyavarman erected a stele at Po Nagar, declaring that he had regained control of the area and had restored the temple. In 787, Javanese invaders destroyed a temple dedicated to Shiva near Panduranga.

=== Javanese raids (774, 787–799) ===
Javanese attacks on Champa and Jiaozhi

In 767, Tonkin coast was hit by Java (Daba) and Kunlun raids, around modern day Hanoi the capital of Tonkin (Annam). Around Son-tay they were vanquished at the hands of Chang Po-i the governor, after the Kunlun and Java (Shepo) assaulted Tongking in 767.

Champa was subsequently assaulted by Javanese or Kunlun vessels in 774 and 787. In 774, an assault was launched on Po-Nagar in Nha-trang where the pirates demolished temples, while in 787 an assault was launched on Phang-rang. Several Champa coastal cities suffered naval raids and assault from Java. Java armadas was called as Javabala-sanghair-nāvāgataiḥ (fleets from Java) which are recorded in Champa epigraphs. All of these raids believed was launched by the Sailendras, ruler of Java and Srivijaya. The possible cause of Javanese assault on Champa was probably prompted by commerce rivalry on serving Chinese market. The 787 epigraph was in Yang Tikuh while the 774 epigraph was Po-nagar.

In Kauthara province in 774, Champa's Siva-linga temple of Po Nagar was assaulted and demolished. Champa source mentioned their invader as foreigners, sea-farers, eaters of inferior food, of frightful appearance, extraordinarily black and thin. The 774 assault by the Javanese happened in the rule of Isvaraloka (Satyavarman). Cham record mentioned that their country was hit by ferocious, pitiless, dark-skinned sea raiders, which modern historians believed to by Javanese. Java had commercial and cultural links to Champa. And assault was initiated on Cambodia. Javanese raid was launched via the Pulo Condor island. Malaya, Sumatra or Java all could have been the origin of the assaulters. The Kauthara Nha Trang temple of Po Nagar was ruined when ferocious, pitiless, dark-skinned men born in other countries, whose food was more horrible than corpses, and who were vicious and furious, came in ships . . . took away the [temple linga], and set fire to the temple. In 774 according to the Nha Trang epigraph in Sanskrit by the Chams. Men born in other lands, living on other foods, frightful to look at, unnaturally dark and lean, cruel as death, passing over the sea in ships assaulted in 774.

In 787, warriors from Java borne over in ships assaulted Champa. In Phan-rang the Sri Bhadradhipatlsvara temple was arsoned by seaborne Java troops in 787, when Indravarman was in power at the hands of the Javanese. It was mentioned the armies of Java, having come in vessels of the 787 assault, and of the previous assault, that Satyavarman, the King of Champa vanquished them as they were followed by good ships and beaten at sea and they were men living on food more horrible than cadavers, frightful, completely black and gaunt, dreadful and evil as death, came in ships in the Nha-trang Po Nagar epigraph in Sanskrit, which called them men born in other countries. The ruin of the temple at Panduranga in 787 came at the hands of the assaulters.

Champa was an important commerce link between China and Srivijaya. The Majapahit and their predecessors the Javanese Mataram had ties with Champa.

Further Cham diplomatic relations with Java occurred in 908 and 911 during the reign of Bhadravarman II (r. 905–917), which the king sent two envoys to the island.

=== The Buddhist dynasty at Indrapura ===
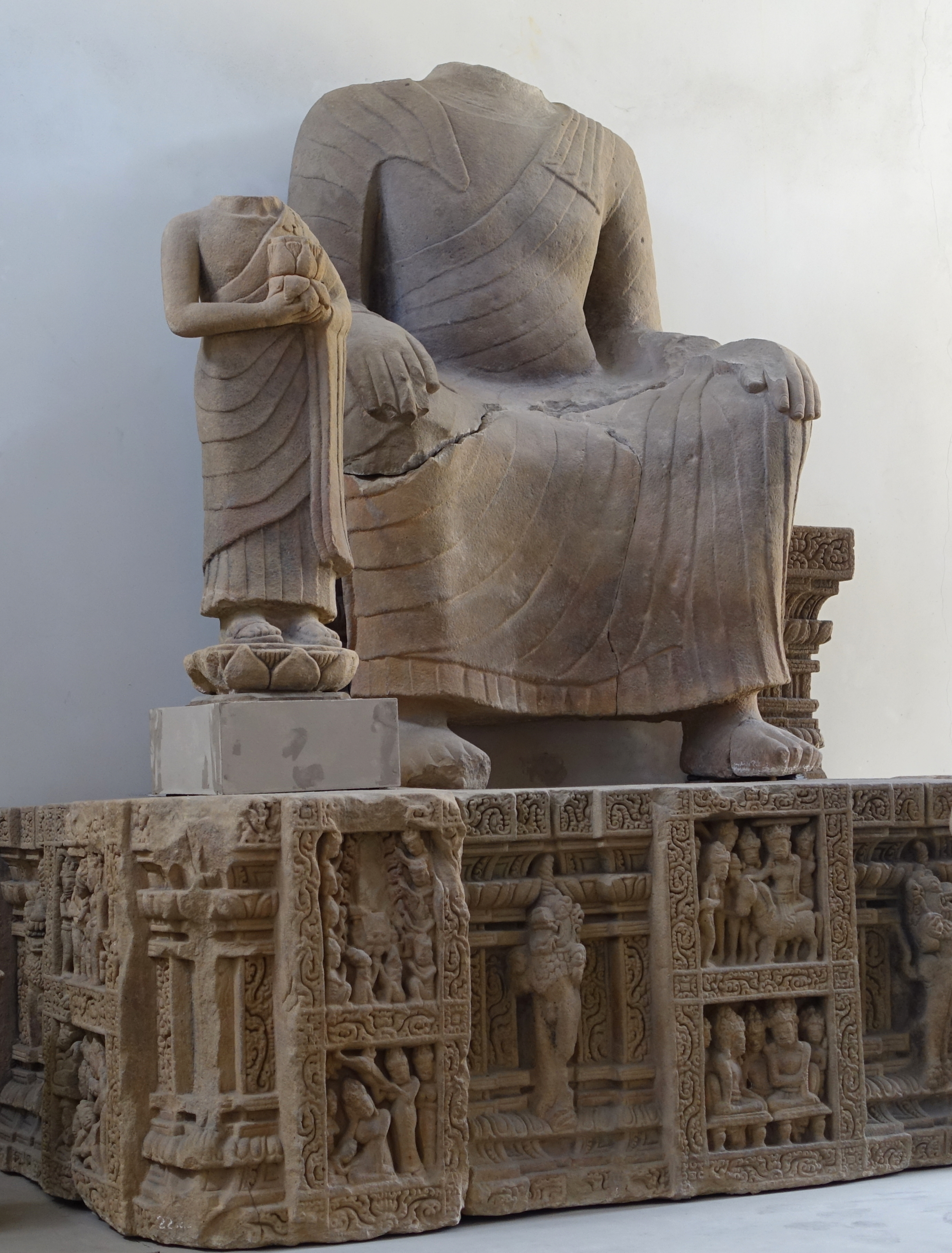
Buddhist altar from Đồng Dương, 9th–10th century AD. Museum of Cham Sculpture, Danang.

In 875, King Indravarman II founded a new northern dynasty at Indrapura (Dong Duong near Da Nang in modern Vietnam). Eager to claim an ancient lineage, Indravarman declared himself the descendant of Bhrigu, the venerable sage whose exploits are detailed in the Mahabharata, and asserted that Indrapura had been founded by the same Bhrigu in ancient times. From 877 onward, the Chinese knew Champa as "Cheng-cheng", discontinuing their use of the term "Huan-wang." Indravarman II repulsed an invasion by the Khmer King Yasovarman I.

Indravarman was the first Cham monarch to adopt Mahayana Buddhism as an official religion. At the center of Indrapura, he constructed a Buddhist monastery (vihara) dedicated to the bodhisattva Lokesvara. The foundation, regrettably, was devastated during the Vietnam War. Thankfully, some photographs and sketches survive from the prewar period. In addition, some stone sculptures from the monastery are preserved in Vietnamese museums. Scholars have called the artistic style typical of the Indrapura the Dong Duong Style. The style is characterized by its dynamism and ethnic realism in the depiction of the Cham people. Surviving masterpieces of the style include several tall sculptures of fierce dvarapalas or temple guardians that were once positioned around the monastery. The period in which Buddhism reigned as the principal religion of Champa came to an end in approximately 925, at which time the Dong Duong Style also began to give way to subsequent artistic styles linked with the restoration of Shaivism as the national religion.

Kings belonging to the dynasty of Indrapura built a number of temples at Mỹ Sơn in the 9th and 10th centuries. Their temples at Mỹ Sơn came to define a new architectural and artistic style, called by scholars the Mỹ Sơn A1 Style, again in reference to a particular foundation at Mỹ Sơn regarded emblematic for the style. With the religious shift from Buddhism back to Shaivism around the beginning of the 10th century, the center of Cham religion also shifted from Dong Duong back to Mỹ Sơn.

== Attrition through conflict with Đại Việt and the Khmer ==
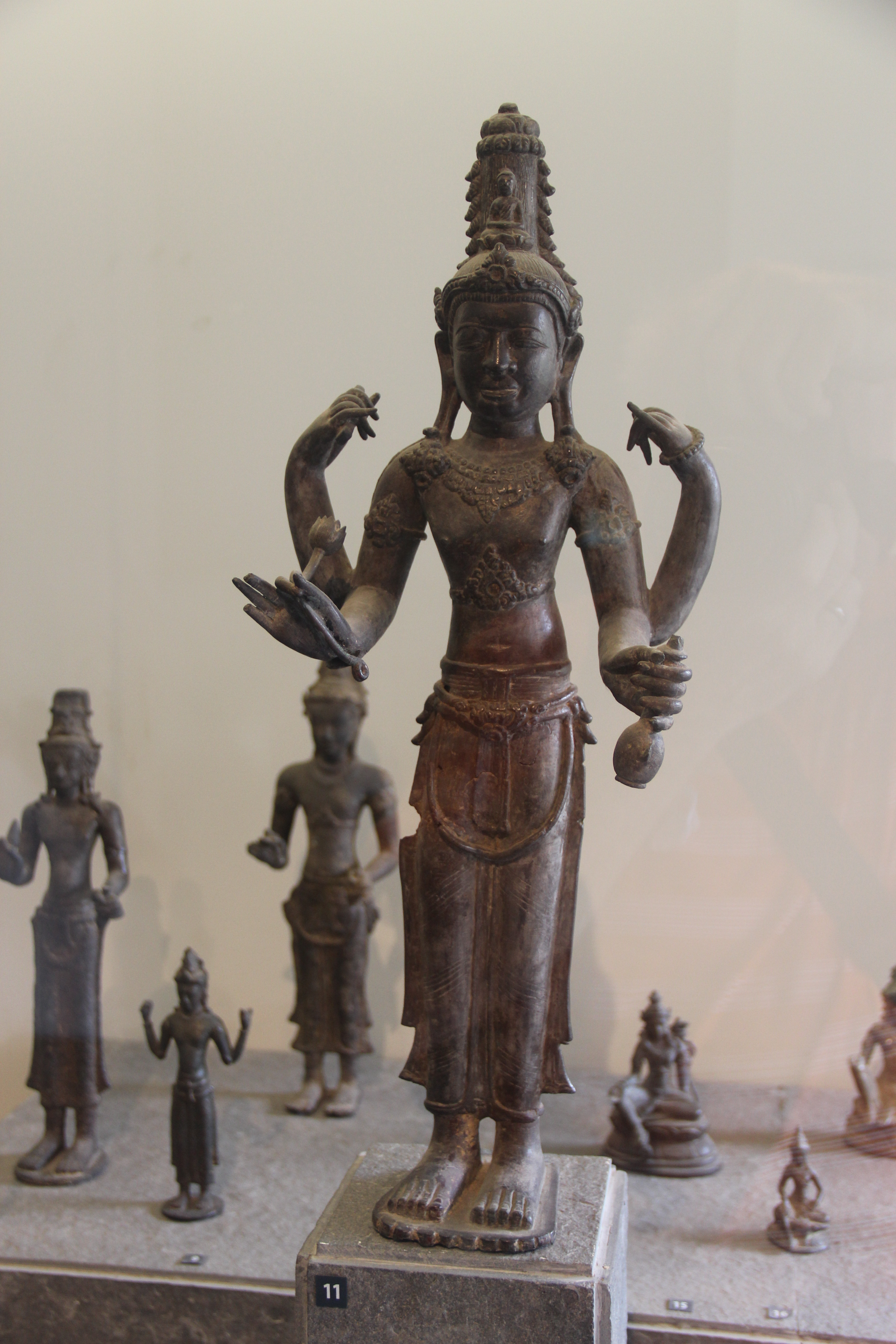
9th-century Campa bronze statues of Avalokiteśvara (Lokeśvara) and Prajñāpāramitā, from Ðại Hữu, Quảng Bình province.

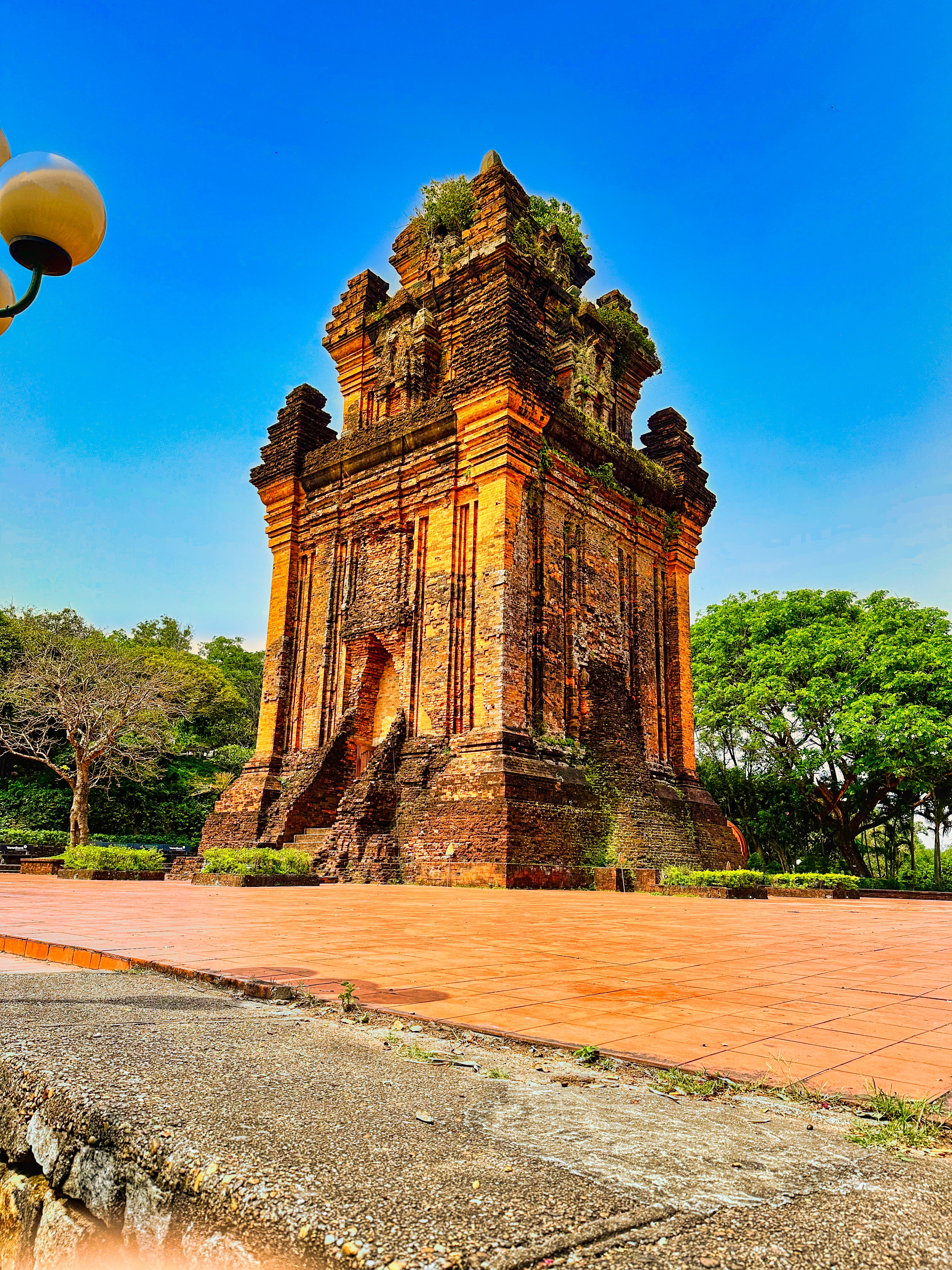
Thap Nhan Hindu temple, Tuy Hoa, Phu Yen province, built around 9–11th century CE

Interesting parallels may be observed between the history of northern Champa (Indrapura and Vijaya) and that of its neighbor and rival to the west, the Khmer civilization of Angkor, located just to the north of the great lake Tonlé Sap in what is now Cambodia. The foundation of the Cham dynasty at Indrapura in 875 was followed by the foundation of the Khmer empire at Roluos in 877 by King Indravarman I, who united two previously independent regions of Cambodia. The parallels continued as the two peoples flourished from the 10th through 12th centuries, then went into gradual decline, suffering their ultimate defeat in the 15th century. In 982, King Lê Hoàn of Đại Việt sent army invaded Champa, sacked Indrapura and beheaded Champa king. The new Champa king agreed to pay tributes to Vietnamese court every year until 1064. In 1238, the Khmer lost control of their western possessions around Sukhothai as the result of a Thai revolt. The successful revolt not only ushered in the era of Thai independence but also foreshadowed the eventual abandonment of Angkor in 1431, following its sack by Thai invaders from the kingdom of Ayutthaya, which had absorbed Sukhothai in 1376. The decline of Champa was roughly contemporaneous with that of Angkor and was precipitated by pressure from Đại Việt of what is now northern Vietnam, culminating in the conquest and obliteration of Vijaya in 1471.

=== Trade with China ===
According to the Daoyi Zhilue documents, around the 11th century Chinese merchants who went to Cham ports in Champa married Cham women, to whom they regularly returned after trading voyages. A Chinese merchant from Quanzhou, Wang Yuanmao, traded extensively with Champa and married a Cham princess.

=== Contact with San-fo-qi ===
The Song Huiyao Jigao lists San-fo-qi (Sanfoche, Three Boja?) for being Champa's one important trade partner. San-fo-qi is mentioned in a Cham envoy 1011 as home for a lion that the Cham had offered the Song court as tribute, though in fact the animal presumably came from Africa or Central Asia.

=== Contact with Ma-i, Butuan, and Sulu ===
The History of Song notes that to the east of Champa through a two-day journey lay the country of Ma-i, while Pu-duan (Butuan) need a seven-day journey, and there were mentions of Cham commercial activities in Butuan. Cham merchants then immigrated to what is the now the Sultanate of Sulu which was still Hindu at that time and known as Lupah Sug, which is also in the Philippines. The Cham migrants were called Orang Dampuan. The Champa civilization and the port-kingdom of Sulu engaged in commerce with each other which resulted in merchant Chams settling in Sulu from the 10th–13th centuries. The Orang Dampuan were slaughtered by envious native Sulu Buranuns due to the wealth of the Orang Dampuan. The Buranun were then subjected to retaliatory slaughter by the Orang Dampuan. Harmonious commerce between Sulu and the Orang Dampuan was later restored. The Yakans were descendants of the Taguima-based Orang Dampuan who came to Sulu from Champa.

=== Relations with Arab peninsula and Persia ===
Part of the SHYJG also notes that in Champa 'their customs and clothing are similar to those of the country of Dashi (a medieval Chinese collective name for the Arab peninsula and Persia).' Among Champa's trade goods to China, textiles from Dashi are recorded, and Dashi is mentioned as one of the transit points for the lion which was brought to the Song court by Champa as tribute. Two Kufic gravestones dating from 1039 in Phan Rang marked a tomb of a Muslim trader named Abu Kamil, which indicates a small Muslim community in 11th century Champa.

=== Khmer invasions of Kauthara (944–950) ===
In 944 and 945, Khmer troops from Cambodia invaded the region of Kauthara. Around 950, the Khmer under Rajendravarman II pillaged the temple of Po Nagar and carried off the statue of the goddess. In 960, the Cham King Jaya Indravaman I sent a delegation with tribute to the first king of the Chinese Song dynasty, which had been established in Kaifeng around 960. In 965, the king restored the temple at Po Nagar and reconstructed the statue of the goddess to replace the one stolen by the Khmer.

=== War with Đại Cồ Việt in 982 ===
In the latter half of the 10th century, the kings of Indrapura waged war against the Vietnamese. The Viet had spent the better part of the century securing and consolidating their independence from the Chinese. Following the defeat of the Chinese fleet by king Ngô Quyền in the Battle of Bạch Đằng in 938, the country had gone through a period of internal turmoil until its final reunification by king Dinh Bo Linh in 968 under the name Đại Cồ Việt kingdom, and the establishment of a capital at Hoa Lư near modern Ninh Bình.

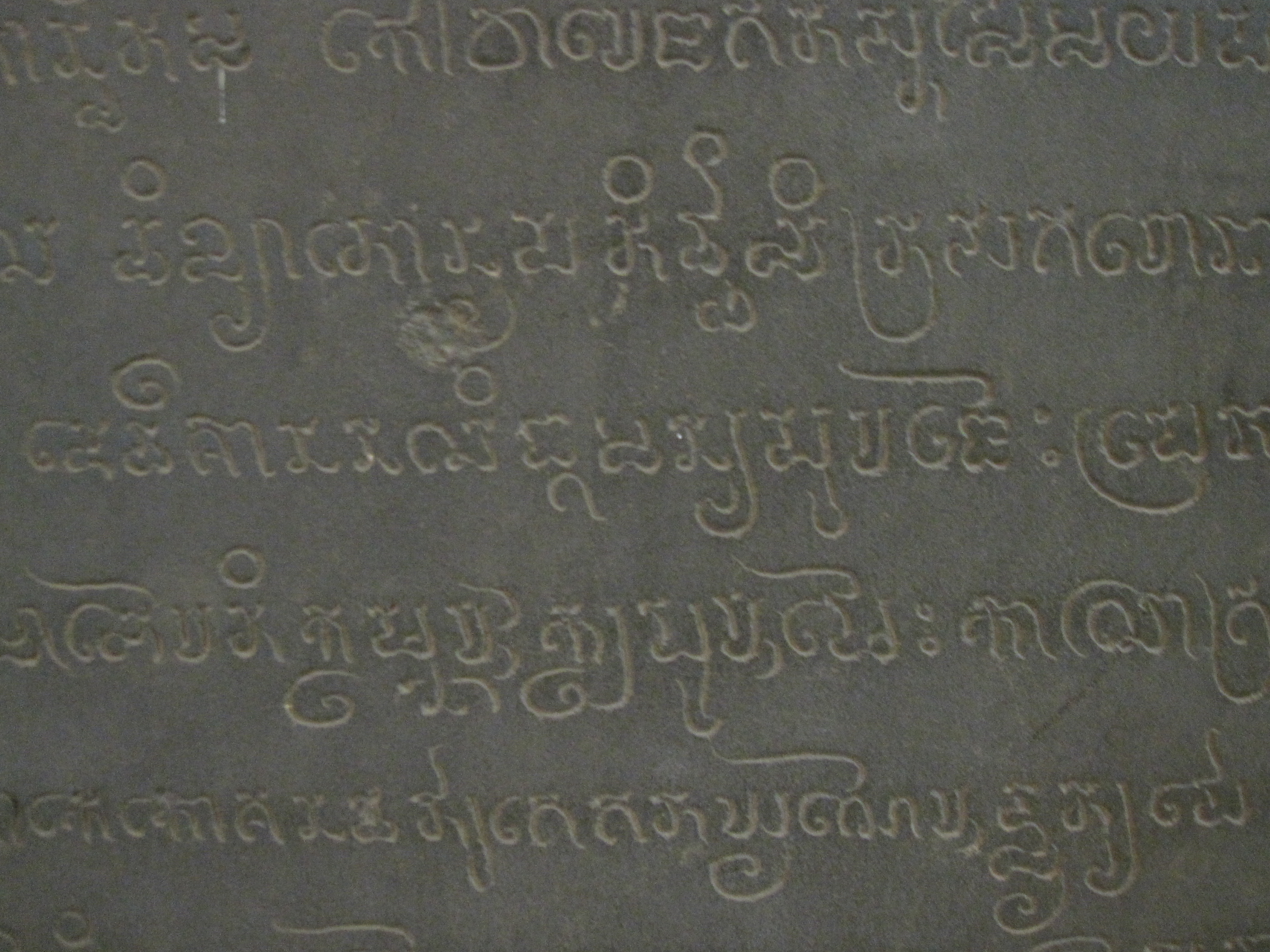
Closeup of the inscription in Cham script on the Po Nagar stele, 965 CE. The stele describes feats by king Jaya Indravarman I (r. 960–972).

In 979, the Cham King Parameshvaravarman I (Phê Mi Thuê to the Viet) sent a fleet to attack Hoa Lư in support of dissatisfied prince Ngô Nhật Khánh following the Vietnamese civil war of twelve warlords. However, the ill-fated expedition was scuttled by a typhoon. In 982, King Lê Hoàn of Đại Cồ Việt sent an ambassador to Indrapura. When the ambassador was detained, Lê Hoàn decided to attack the Cham capital. Viet troops sacked the citadel of Dia Ly and killed Parameshvararman I. They carried off women from the king's entourage, gold, silver, and other precious objects. As a result of these setbacks, the Cham abandoned Indrapura around 1000. From 986 to 989, a Vietnamese man named Lưu Kế Tông (or Liu Ke-Tsong in Chinese record), alleged took the throne of the Cham king in Indrapura and reigned the country for 3 years. The center of Champa was relocated south to Vijaya in modern Bình Định. Michael Vickery doubts this narrative. He insists that the new king Harivarman II (r. 989–997) was crowned in the city of Foshi, or Indrapura, rather than Vijaya, as textual evidence from inscriptions and Chinese texts had provided. When the Vietnamese sent Cham prisoners to China, the Chinese sent them back to Champa in 992.

Several Chinese accounts record Cham arriving on Hainan. When the Cham capital fell in 982 to Dai Viet, several Cham fled to Hainan during the Song dynasty. After the fall of the capital Indrapura, some Cham fled to Guangzhou as well. They became a–ncestors of the modern day Utsuls on Hainan, who are Muslims and still speak a Cham language.

Champa rice was introduced from Champa to China during the reign of Emperor Zhenzong of Song.

=== Sack of Vijaya by the Việt (11th century) ===
Conflict between Champa and Đại Việt did not end, however, with the abandonment of Indrapura. Champa suffered further Viet attacks in 1021 and 1026. In 1044, a catastrophic battle resulted in the death of the Cham King Sa Dau and the sack of Vijaya by Đại Việt under Lý Thái Tông. The invaders captured elephants and musicians and even the Cham queen Mi E, who preserved her honor by throwing herself into the waves as her captors attempted to transport her to their country. Thirty thousand Cham were killed. Champa began to pay tribute to the Viet kings, including a white rhinoceros in 1065 and a white elephant in 1068 sent to Lý Thánh Tông. In 1068, however, the King of Vijaya Rudravarman III (Che Cu) allegedly attacked Đại Việt in order to reverse the setbacks of 1044. Again the Cham were defeated, and again Đại Việt captured and burned Vijaya. These events were repeated in 1069 when Lý Thánh Tông took a fleet to Champa, torched Vijaya, and captured Rudravarman III. The Champa king eventually purchased his freedom in exchange for three northern districts of his realm. Taking advantage of the debacle, a leader in southern Champa rebelled and established an independent kingdom. The northern kings were not able to reunite the country until 1084.

=== Khmer invasions of northern Champa (1074, 1144–1149) ===
In 1074, King Harivarman IV took the throne, restoring the temples at Mỹ Sơn and ushering in a period of relative prosperity. Harivarman made peace with Đại Việt but provoked war with the Khmer of Angkor. In 1080, a Khmer army attacked Vijaya and other centers in northern Champa. Temples and monasteries were sacked and cultural treasures were carried off. After much misery, Cham troops under King Harivarman were able to defeat the invaders and restored the capital and temples.

Around 1080, a new dynasty from the Khorat Plateau in modern Thailand occupied the throne of Angkor in Cambodia. Soon enough, the kings of the new dynasty embarked on a program of empire-building. Rebuffed in their attempts to conquer Đại Việt in the 1128, 1132, and 1138, they turned their attention to Champa. In 1145, a Khmer army under King Suryavarman II, the founder of Angkor Wat, occupied Vijaya, ending the reign of Jaya Indravarman III, and destroying the temples at Mỹ Sơn. The Khmer king then attempted the conquest of all of northern Champa. In 1149, however, the ruler of the southern principality of Panduranga, King Jaya Harivarman I, defeated the invaders and had himself consecrated king of kings in Vijaya. He spent the rest of his reign putting down rebellions in Amaravati and Panduranga.

=== Sack of Angkor by the Cham (1177) ===
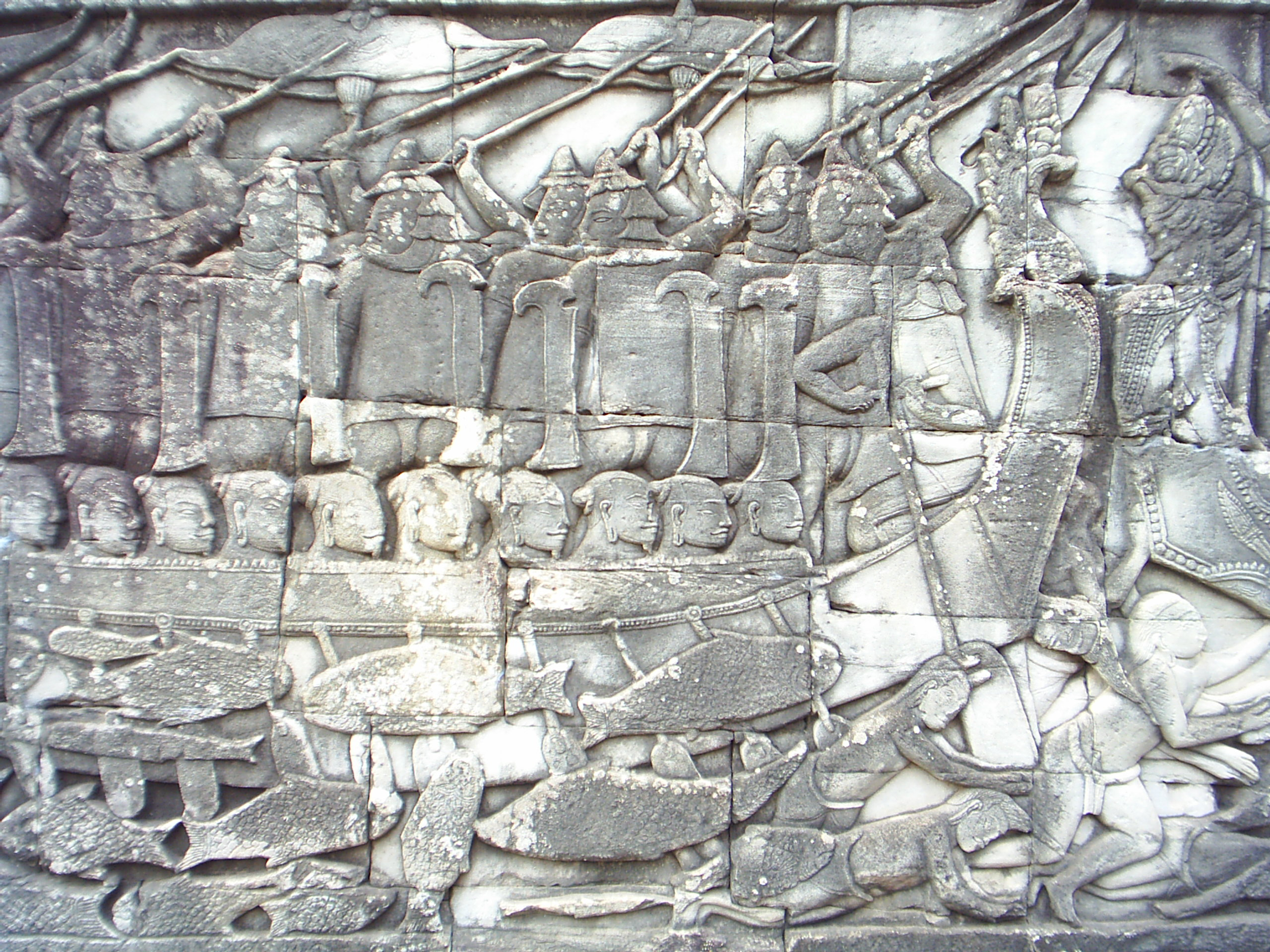
This bas relief at the late 12th-century Angkorian temple called the Bayon depicts Cham mariners in action against the Khmer.

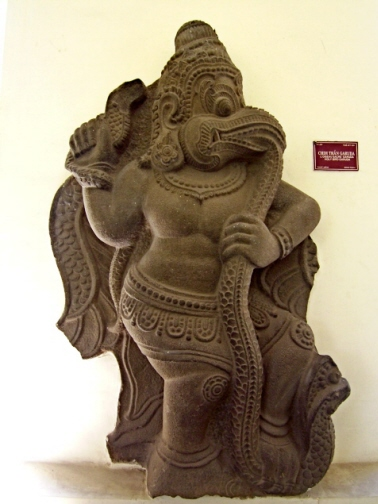
13th century sculpture in the Thap Mam style, depicting Garuda devouring a serpent

In 1167, King Jaya Indravarman IV ascended to the throne in Champa. An inscription characterized him as brave, well-versed in weapons, and knowledgeable of philosophy, Mahayana theories, and the Dharmasutra. After securing peace with Đại Việt in 1170, Jaya Indravarman invaded Cambodia with inconclusive results. In 1177, however, his troops launched a surprise attack against the Khmer capital of Yasodharapura from warships piloted up the Mekong River to the great lake Tonlé Sap in Cambodia. The invaders sacked the capital in 1177, killed the Khmer king Tribhuvanaditya, and made off with much booty.

China transferred crossbow technology to Champa. When the Chams sacked Angkor they used the Chinese siege crossbow. Crossbows were given to the Chams by China. Crossbows and archery while mounted were instructed to the Cham by a Chinese in 1171.

=== Conquest of Champa by the Khmer and Cambodian rule (1190–1220) ===
The Khmer were rallied by a new king, Jayavarman VII, who drove the Cham from Cambodia in 1181. When Jaya Indravarman IV launched another attack against Cambodia in 1190, Jayavarman VII appointed a Cham prince named Vidyanandana to lead the Khmer army. Vidyanandana defeated the invaders and proceeded to occupy Vijaya and to capture Jaya Indravarman IV, whom he sent back to Angkor as a prisoner.

Adopting the title of Shri Suryavarmadeva (or Suryavarman), Vidyanandana made himself king of Panduranga. He made Prince In, a brother-in-law of Jayavarman VII, "King Suryajayavarmadeva in the Nagara of Vijaya" (or Suryajayavarman). In 1191 a revolt at Viajaya drove Suryajayavarman back to Cambodia and enthroned Jaya Indravarman V. Vidyanandana occupied Viajaya, killed both Jaya Indravarman IV and Jaya Indravarman V, then "reigned without opposition over the Kingdom of Champa," but he declared his independence from Cambodia. Khmer troops attempted unsuccessfully to regain control over Champa throughout the 1190s. In 1203, finally, Jayavarman VII's general Yuvaraja Mnagahna On Dhanapati Grama defeated Suryavarman, sending him into exile. Champa effectively became a province of Angkor, not to regain its independence until 1220. Jaya Paramesvaravarman II was crowned in 1226 and built his palace in Shri Vijaya, restoring the Champas to power. Trần Thái Tông sent a punitive expedition against Champa for its continued piracy of the Đại Việt coast, bringing back the Champa Queen Bo-da-la and the king's concubines as prisoners in 1252. Indravarman V was crowned in 1266, in time to become subject to the Mongols as "Imperial Prince of the second rank".

=== Invasion of the Mongols (1282–1287) ===
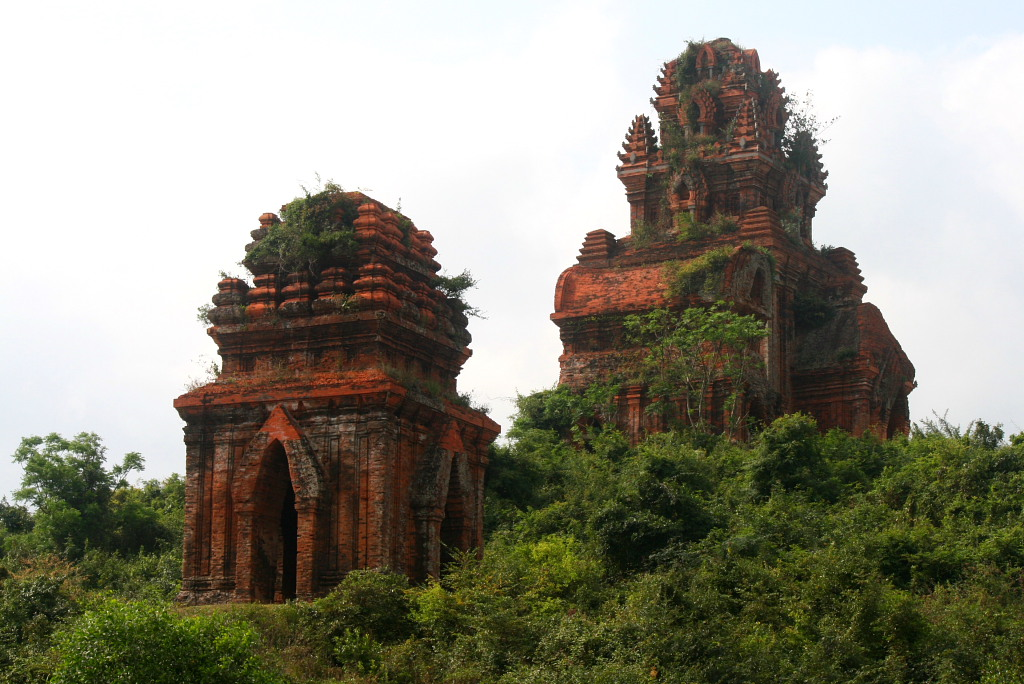
The temple complex of Thap Banh It near Vijaya

When the Chinese Song dynasty fell to the Mongols, its loyalists fled to Champa where they plotted the reconquest of China. In the 1270s, Kublai Khan had established his capital and dynasty at Beijing and had toppled the southern Chinese Song dynasty. By 1280, he would turn his attention to the Cham and Viet kingdoms located in the territory of modern Vietnam.

In 1283, Mongol troops of the Yuan dynasty under General Sogetu (Sagatou, So Tou, So To, or Sodu) invaded Champa and occupied Vijaya after capturing the citadel of Mou-cheng. However, Indravarman V fled into the mountains. Despite dispersion the Champa troops on a number of occasions, the Mongols were not "progressing one step into a country where they suffered from the heat, illness, and a lack of supplies." Trần Thánh Tông and then Trần Nhân Tông, just like Indravarman V, "obstinately refused" to present themselves to the court of the Khan or make any "act of vassalage", and refused the Mongols passage through Đại Việt.

Thus the invasion of Champa had little lasting effect. Then, in June 1285, the Yuan commander, Prince Toghon was defeated and Sogetu was killed in a botched invasion of Đại Việt. By then, the Yuan "had lost a great number of men and officers...without having obtained any sizeable advantage." However, Indravarman V did send an ambassador to Kublai on 6 Oct. 1285.

=== Chế Mân ===
In 1307, the Cham King Jaya Simhavarman III (Chế Mân), the founder of the still extant temple of Po Klong Garai in Panduranga (present-day Phan Rang), ceded two northern districts to Đại Việt in exchange for the hand in marriage of a Viet princess, Huyền Trân. Not long after the nuptials, the king died, and the princess returned to her northern home in order to avoid a Cham custom that would have required her to join her husband in death. However, the lands that Chế Mân had rashly ceded were not returned. In order to regain these lands, and encouraged by the decline of Đại Việt in the course of the 14th century, the troops of Champa began to make regular incursions into the territory of their neighbor to the north.

=== Decline of Champa in the 14th century ===
The fourteenth century saw a great void of indigenous information within Champa, with no inscription was erected after 1307, until 1401, although the Cham annals still has a list of 14th century kings of Panduranga. Religious construction and art came to a standstill, and sometimes degraded. These could be hints of decline of Indic culture in Champa, or consequence of Champa's devastating war with the Dai Viet and the Sukhothai.

For the reasons of the complete blackout of 14th-century Cham historiography, Pierre Lafont argues, were perhaps due to Champa's previous long conflicts with their neighbors, the Angkor Empire and Dai Viet, and recently Mongols, had caused mass destruction and socio-cultural breakdown. Unraveled grievances and deteriorating economic conditions continued to pile up. Engraving Sanskrit inscriptions in Champa, the language mainly used for religious purposes, ceased to exist by 1253. Some cities and farmland were left abandoned, such as Tra Kieu (Simhapura). The gradual religious shift to Islam in Champa from 11th to 15th centuries undermined the established Hindu-Buddhist kingship and the king's spiritual divinity, resulting in growing royal frustrations and strife between the Cham aristocracy. These led to constant instability and the ultimate decline of Champa during the 14th century.

Because none inscription within Champa during this period have been found, it's insecure to establish a lineage of Champa rulers without knowing what their native names and which years they reigned. Historians have to recite various Vietnamese chronicles and Chinese annals to reconstruct Champa during the 14th century cautiously. Etienne Aymonier proposes a reconstructed list of 14th-century Campa ruler, which is widely accepted:

Chế Mân → Chế Chí → Chế Năng → Chế A Nan → Trà Hòa Bố Để → Chế Bồng Nga → La Khai (Jaya Simhavarman VI)

==== Chế Chi and Chế Anan ====
Chế Mân's son, Chế Chi, was captured in 1312 by Trần Anh Tông and died a prisoner in Gia-lam Palace. Champa thus became a Vietnamese province. Chế Anan was able to win back its independence in 1326.

The Franciscan friar Odoric of Pordenone visited Champa in the 1320s.

==== Chế Bồng Nga — the Red King ====
The last strong king of the Cham was Chế Bồng Nga, or Che Bunga, who ruled from 1360 until 1390. In Vietnamese stories he is called The Red King. Chế Bồng Nga apparently managed to unite the Cham lands under his rule, and by 1372 he was strong enough to attack and almost conquer Đại Việt from the sea.

Cham forces sacked Thăng Long, the capital city of Đại Việt (located at the site of modern Hanoi), in 1371 and then again in 1377. This second attack was soon after Trần Duệ Tông died attacking Vijaya. Champa attacks in 1380, 1382, and 1383 were checked by the Vietnamese General Hồ Quý Ly, future founder of the Hồ dynasty. Chế Bồng Nga was finally stopped in 1390 during another assault on the Vietnamese capital, when his royal barge received a musketry salvo.

This was the last serious offensive by the Cham against Đại Việt, but it helped spell the end of the Trần dynasty, which had forged its reputation in the wars against the Mongols a century earlier, but which now revealed itself as weak and ineffective in the face of the Cham invasions.

=== Defeat and destruction of Vijaya by Đại Việt ===
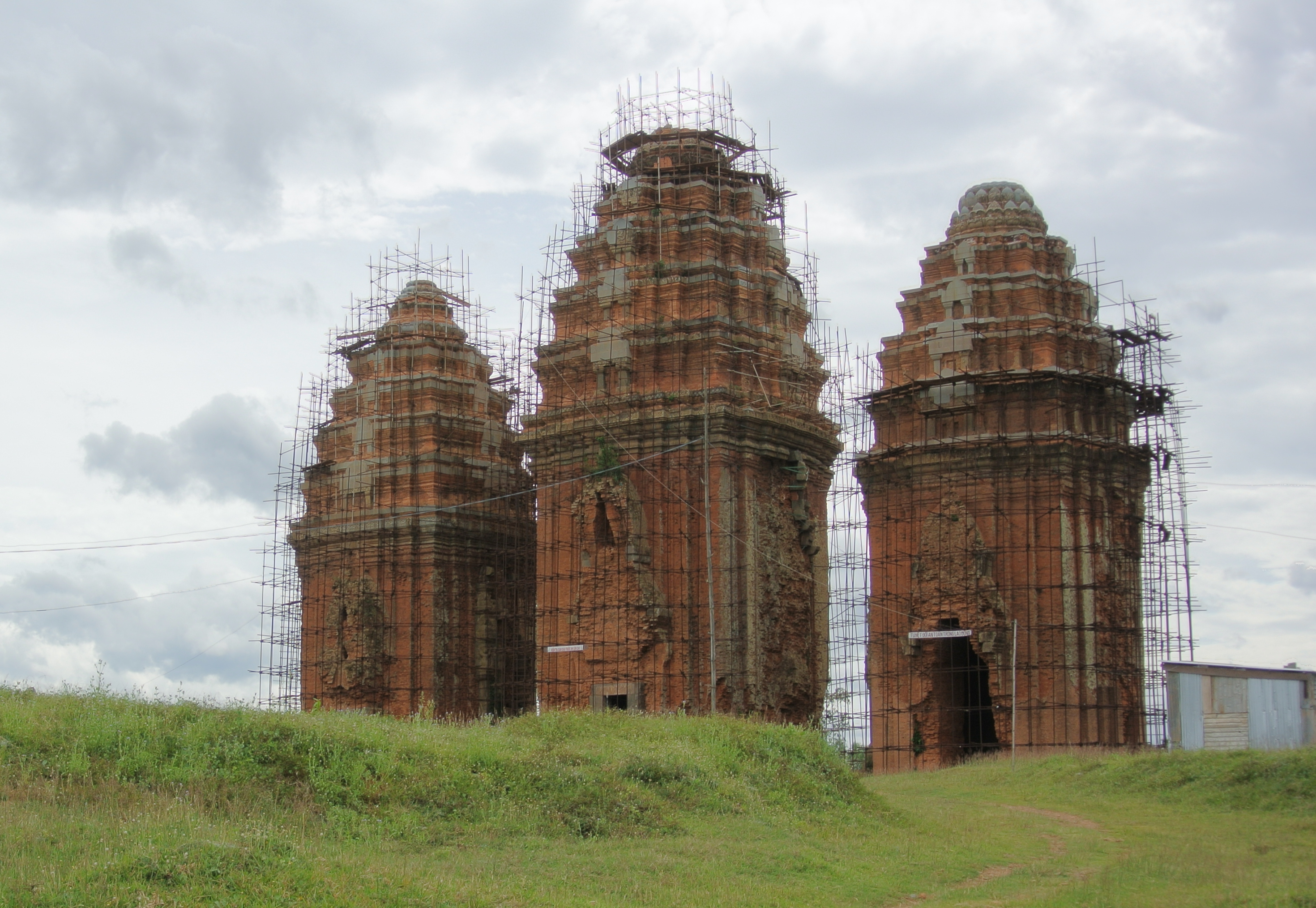
The 11th century Dương Long Towers at Vijaya, the ancient Cham capital.

During the reign of the Hongwu Emperor in Ming China, Champa sent tribute to China to garner Chinese help in the wars with the Dai Viet. The Hongwu Emperor was dead set against military actions in the region of Southeast Asia, merely rebuking the Vietnamese for their offensive. In 1401 and 1402, Hồ Quý Ly sent expeditions against Champa, forcing Indravarman VI to relinquish half of his territory. Indravarman VI was able to regain his territory when the Yongle Emperor captured Hồ Quý Ly and Hồ Hán Thương during the Ming conquest of Dai Viet in 1407. Indravarman VI then engaged in raiding the Khmer's under Ponhea Yat. Ming China was asked to deal with Dai Viet by Champa. Hostilities against Champa were initiated by the new Vietnamese dynasty.

Champa's economy and commerce still flourished during early half of the 15th century. A Cham record in Drang Lai (present-day in Gia Lai) mentions lauvv (Lao), yvan (Viet), kur (Khmer), syaṁ (Siamese), [ja]vā (Javanese), vaṅgalā (Bengali) merchants of various kingdoms arrived in the highlands of Champa to trade and offered to the service of a temple of Śiva.

Following raids by Maha Vijaya into Hoa-chau in 1444 and 1445, Đại Việt Emperor Lê Nhân Tông, under the leadership of Trịnh Khả, launched an invasion of Champa in 1446. The attack was successful, Vijaya fell to the invaders, and "Maha Vijaya" was taken prisoner. Maha Qui-lai was then made Emperor of Champa.

After the Champa king Maha Sajan or Tra-Toan, attacked Hoa-chau in 1469, Đại Việt emperor Lê Thánh Tông led a retaliatory invasion the following year with a vanguard fleet of 100,000 men, followed by 150,000 support civilians and settlers more ten days later. Vijaya was captured in 1471, along with Tra-Toan and 30,000 other Cham, while 60,000 Cham were killed. Tra-Toan "fell ill and died near Nghe An aboard the junk that was taking him away." According to linguistic study Acehnese people of northern Sumatra and Cham are related through the Aceh–Chamic languages. At least 60,000 Cham people were killed and 30,000 were taken as slaves by the Vietnamese army. The capital of Vijaya was obliterated. As a result of the victory, Lê Thánh Tông annexed the principalities of Amaravati and Vijaya. This defeat caused the first major Cham emigration, particularly to Cambodia and Malacca.

The trade in Vietnamese ceramics was damaged due to the plummet in trade by Cham merchants after the invasion. After the war, the Vietnamese navy took patrol over the South China sea trade routes, established Hoi An as the trade city, freely exporting Vietnamese products to Southeast Asia.

== Later history of Champa ==
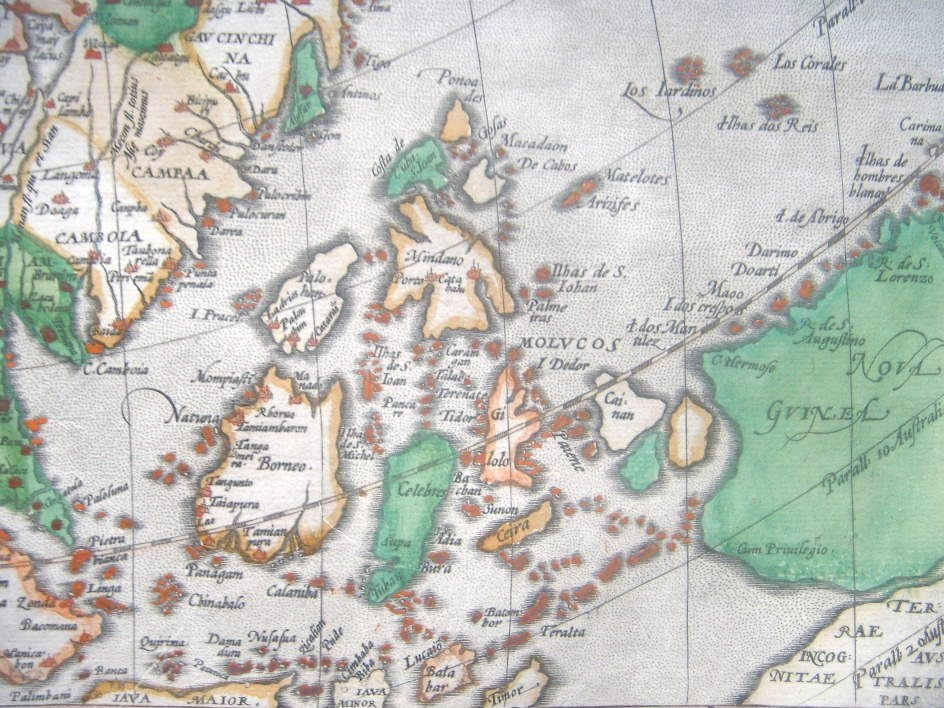
Map published in 1583 depicting Champa (Campaa)

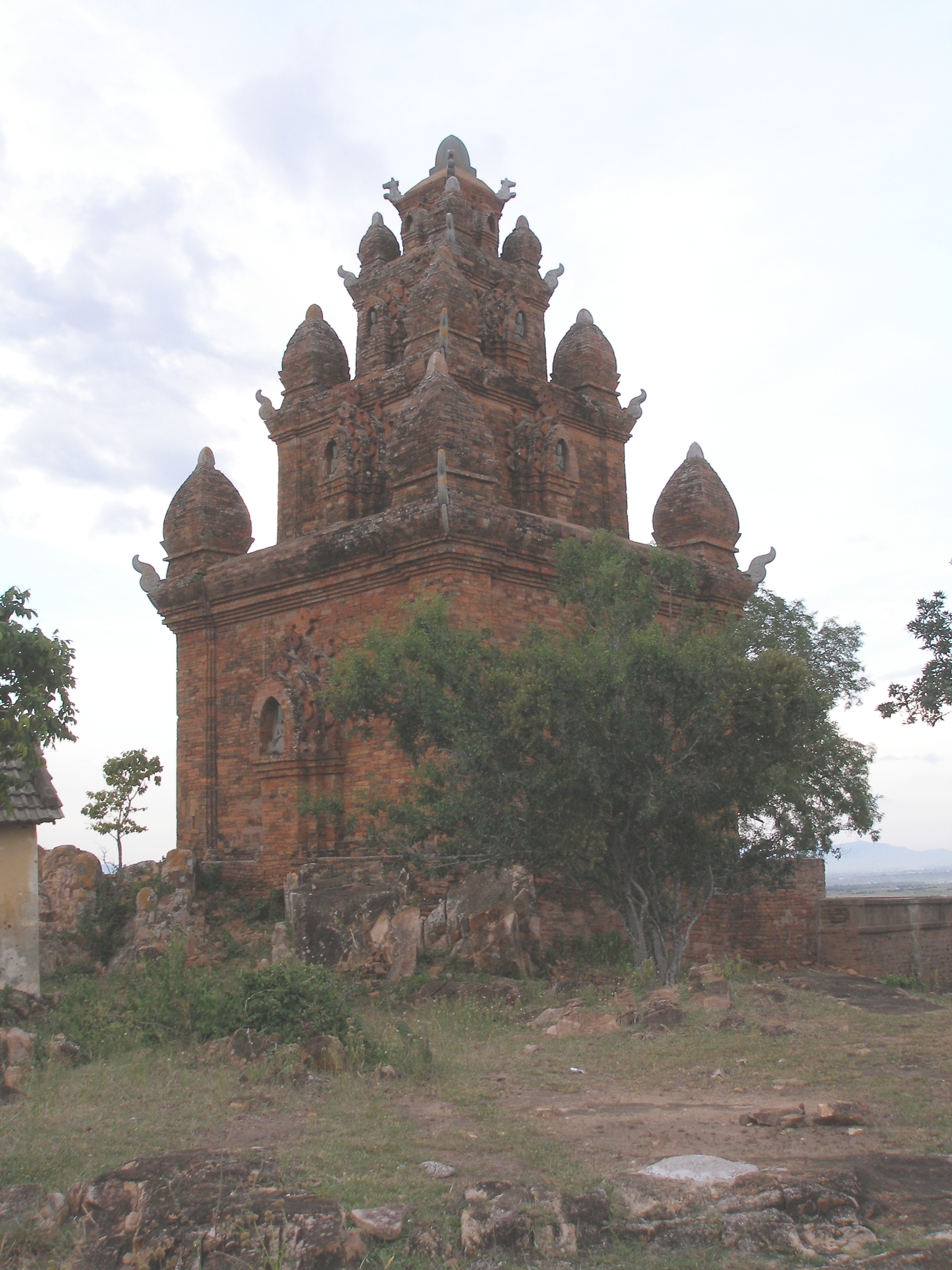
The temple of King Po Rome (?–1651) of Panduranga

What remained of historical Champa was the rump state of Hoa Anh (Kauthara) and the southern principality of Panduranga, where the Cham general Bo Tri-tri proclaimed himself king, and offered vassalage to Lê Thánh Tông. Hoa Anh was invaded in 1578 by the forces of the Nguyễn Lords while Panduranga preserved some of its independence. This was the starting point of the modern Cham Lords in the principality of Panduranga (Phan Rang, Phan Ri and Phan Thiết).

The Portuguese's fort on Malacca was counterattacked by the Johor Sultanate along with an expeditionary force from Champa in 1594. Cambodia was the refuge of Chams who fled along with Po Chien after Champa lost more lands in 1720 to the Vietnamese.

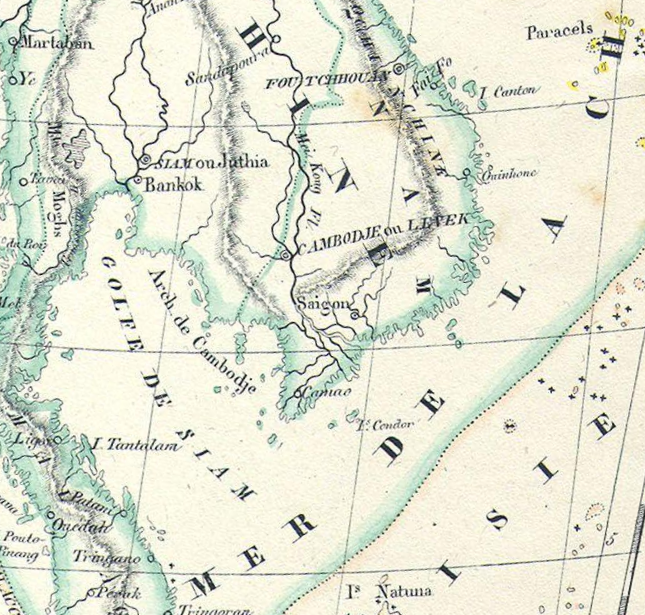
1836 French map of Southeast Asia showing no trace of Champa after the Vietnamese annexation of 1832.

When the Ming dynasty in China fell, Chinese refugees fled south and extensively settled on Cham lands and in Cambodia. Most of these Chinese were young men, and they took Cham women as wives. Their children identified more with Chinese culture. This migration occurred in the 17th and 18th centuries.

The Vietnamese subjugated Phú Yên in 1578, Cam Ranh in 1653, and established the Principality of Thuận Thành in 1695. Cham provinces were seized by the Nguyễn domain. An anti-Vietnamese rebellion by the Cham occurred in 1728 after the death of their ruler Po Saktiraydaputih. Panduranga, the last remnant of the Cham Kingdom, fell in 1832 to the Emperor Minh Mạng.

The Cham Muslim (Cam Baruw) leader Katip Sumat was educated in Kelantan and came back to Champa to declare a Jihad against the Vietnamese after Emperor Minh Mạng's annexation of Champa. The Vietnamese coercively fed lizard and pig meat to Cham Muslims and cow meat to Cham Hindus against their will to punish them and assimilate them to Vietnamese culture. Emperor Minh Mang ordered his soldiers to collect three Cham heads everyday in response to Cham revolts. Many Cham Muslims fled to neighboring Cambodia and Malaysia, making Cambodia the largest Cham diaspora center. The killings of Chams under emperor Minh Mạng continued until his death in 1841.

Under colonial rule, the Cham Muslims were called "Malays" by French in Indochina. Later Sihanouk classified them as "Islamic Khmers", and they were heavily discriminated. When Cambodia fell to the Khmer Rouge in 1975, the regime started targeting the Cham minority mainly populating in rural provinces of Kompong Cham, Battambang, and Siem Reap. In 1977, Cham language was banned, Quran were burned and mosques were closing down.

Cham Muslim communities in the countrysides were not allowed to own land, instead they constituted a middlemen economy in rural areas as fishermen, craftsmen, shop owners, vendors and retailers. The Khmer Rouge considered the Cham as a bourgeoisie class, though real Khmer Rouge motives might have been based on racial hatred.

Khmer Rouge cadres would systemically single out the Cham from a group of villagers and shoot them. In early 1979, Khmer Rouge officials vowed "Accordingly, Cham nationality, language, customs and religious beliefs must be immediately abolished. Those who fail to obey this order will suffer all the consequences for their acts of opposition to Angkar [the Khmer Rouge high command]." It's estimated that around 100,000 Chams in the east bank of the Mekong River were executed from July 1978 until the Vietnamese invasion that overthrew the regime and ended the Cambodian genocide in January 1979.

A third wave of Cham refugee migrated to other countries, some headed back to Vietnam, other to the United States. In November 2018, the Chamber Trial of the Extraordinary Chambers in the Courts of Cambodia (ECCC) ruled that the Khmer Rouge's mass killings of Cham and Vietnamese fit the definition of genocide, however the trial dropped its charge against former Khmer Rouge officials in 2022 as judges from the National Cambodian court blocked further investigations and cases.

=== Modern status ===
Today, the Chams are recognized as one of official 54 ethnic groups in Vietnam. Ethnic Chams in the Mekong Delta have also been economically marginalized and pushed into poverty by Vietnamese policies, with ethnic Vietnamese Kinh settling on majority Cham land with state support, and religious practices of minorities have been targeted for elimination by the government.
