= Võ Cạnh inscription =

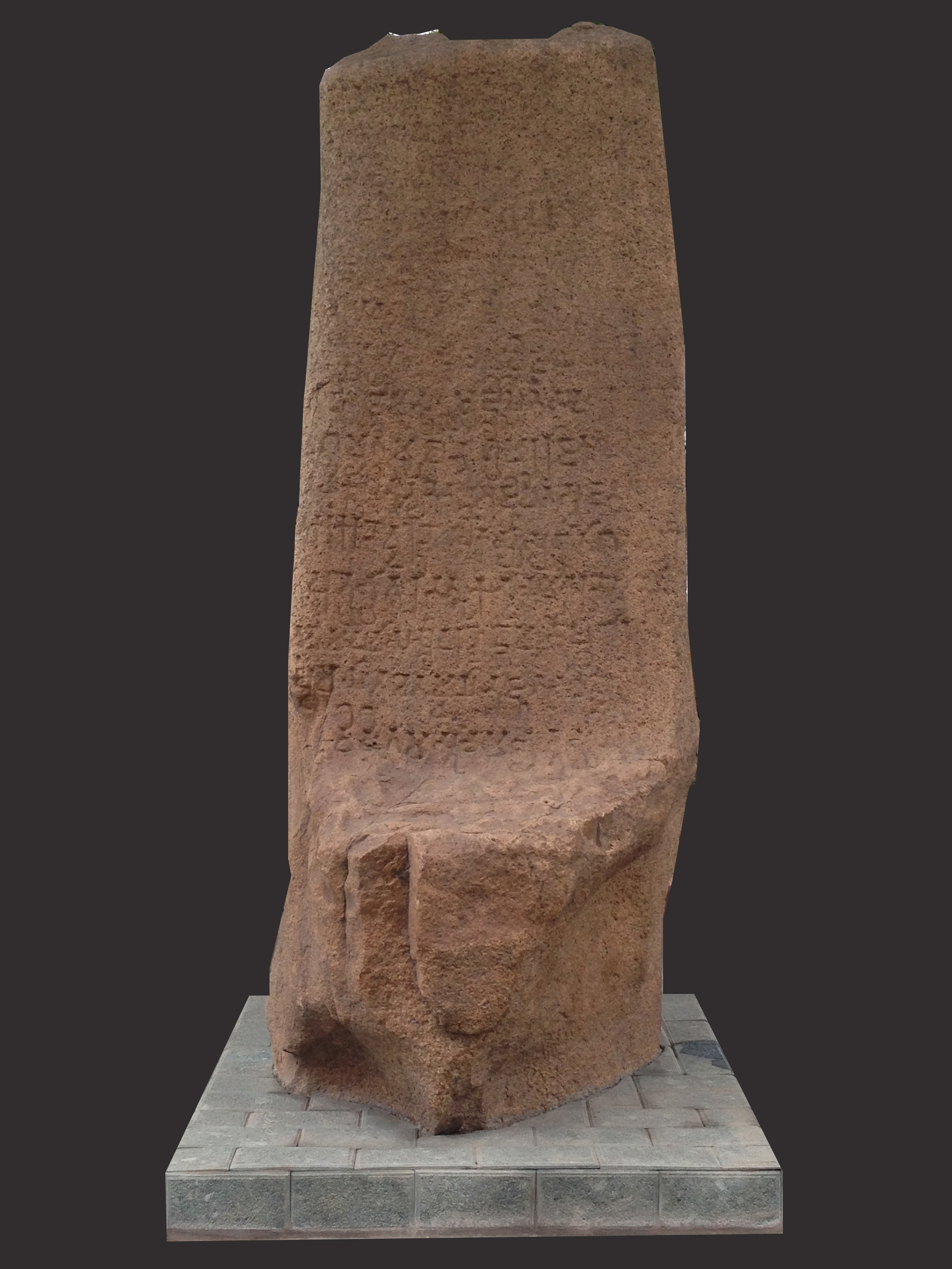
Vo Canh Stele at National Museum of Vietnamese History (classified as a Vietnam's National Treasure)

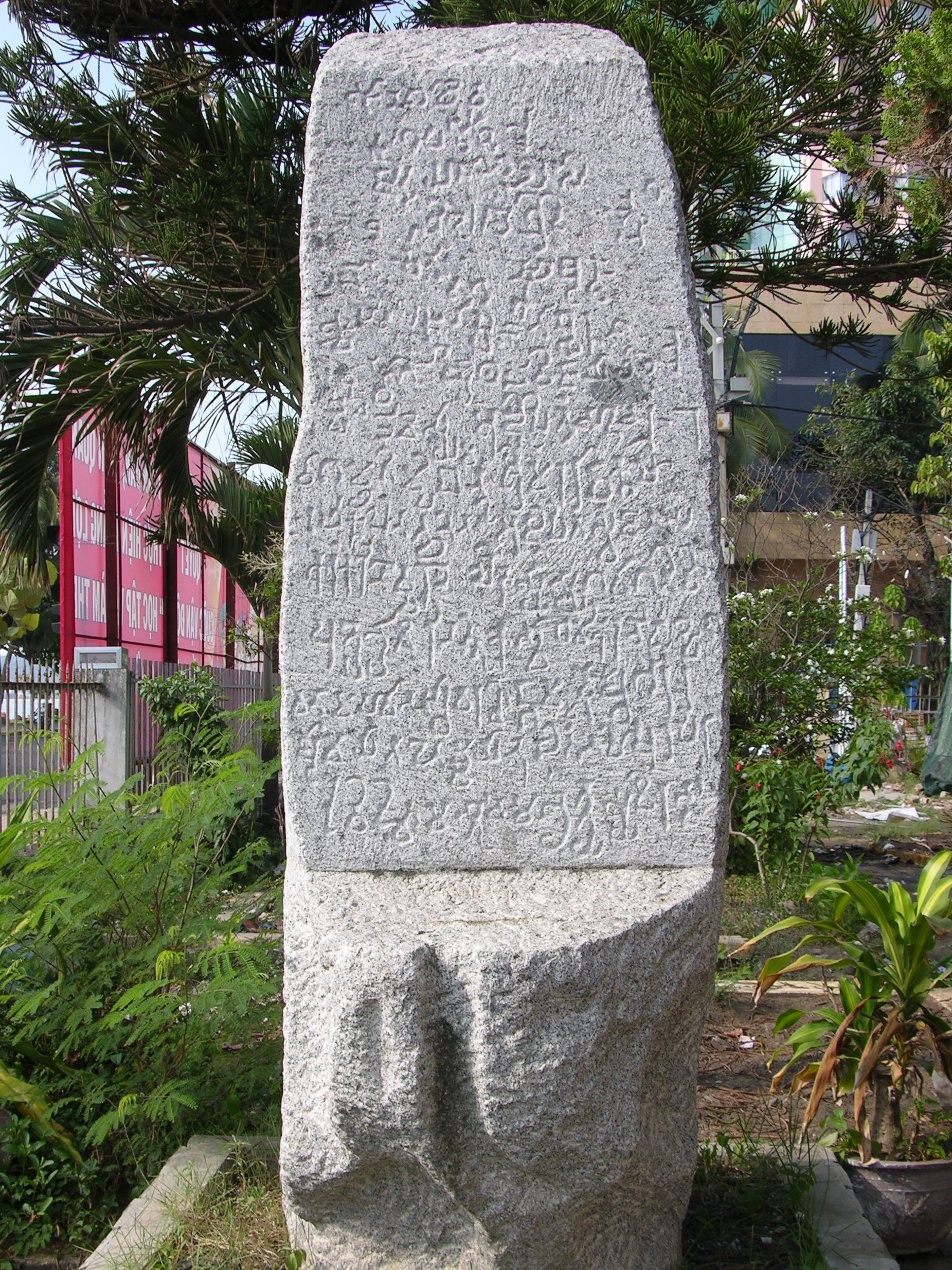
Võ Cạnh inscription, written in Sanskrit, was found in the village of Võ Cạnh, Nha Trang, Khanh Hoa, Vietnam. A replica at Khanh Hoa Museum.

The Võ Cạnh inscription or Inscription C. 40 is the oldest Sanskrit inscription ever found in Southeast Asia, discovered in 1885 in the village of Võ Cạnh, about 4 km from the city of Nha Trang, Vietnam. This inscription is in the form of a 2.5 m high stone stele, with three uneven sides.

The inscription mentions the name of King Sri Mara, which according to paleographic analysis was to whom it was erected by his descendants around 2nd or 3rd century CE. There are still debates whether the inscription was a legacy of Lâm Ấp, Champa, or Funan. George Coedès mentioned the possibility of identifying Sri Mara with Fan Shih-man (c. 230 CE), which according to the Chinese chronicles was one of the rulers of Funan. Coedès considered the Võ Cạnh inscription as proof of the first wave of Indianization in Southeast Asia.

New academic assertions reassess the date of the Vo Canh stele to cannot be precisely dated earlier than the fourth century AD. The stele itself testifies traces of lexical influence and cultural connection between the Gupta Empire (4th-6th cen. AD) with early Champa. Historian Anton O. Zakharov from the Russian Academy of Sciences, and another paleographer, D.C. Sircar, affirm the date of >4th century AD or even late as 5th century AD because the Vo Canh stele contains verses in poetic meter Vasantatilaka, which can be found in inscriptions of Samudragupta who reigned from 335 to 376. Line 15 also detects the term bhrtya 'royal servant or minister.' Both appear only in Gupta Empire period epigraphy for the first time. According to D.C. Sircar in his Indian Epigraphic Glossary, the word bhrtya is an extremely rare occurrence. Bhrtya signifies a vassal ruler, its usage only emerged during 455-458 AD. Subsequently, the date of the stele could be late as mid- or late-5th century AD.

Currently, the inscription is stored in the National Museum of Vietnamese History in the city of Hanoi, Vietnam. The stele was designated as a national treasure of Vietnam by the Vietnamese Prime Minister's decision in 2013.

== Text ==
The Sanskrit text written on this inscription has been severely damaged. Of the three sides of the inscription stele, on the first side at least the first six lines are almost completely blurred, and so are the first eight lines on the second side. On the third side, even only a few characters can still be read.

The parts of the text that can still be read contain the following phrases:

- "compassion for the creatures"
- "the priests, of course, who have drunk the ambrosia of the hundred words of the king"
- "the ornament... by that which is the joy of the family of the daughter of the grandson of King Sri Mara... has been ordained"
- "those who are seated on the throne"
- "that which has to do with silver or gold"
- "material treasure"
- "all that is provided by me as one who is kind and useful"
- "my minister Vira"
- "the edict which bring the welfare of the creatures, by the better of the two karin, the going and coming of this world"

The mention of "the joy of the family of the daughter of the grandson of King Sri Mara .." may indicate the existence of a matrilineal system, which applies inheritance of assets to female relatives. The word karin can mean "ivory" or "tax", which here may mean the king was a generous person.

The use of certain Sanskrit terms in the inscription text, according to Jean Filliozat, shows the possibility that Valmiki's Ramayana epic was spread on the Indochina peninsula at the time this inscription was made. The Hindu religious terms used in the inscriptions is thought to date from pre-puranic time.

== See also ==
- History of Champa
- Sri Mara (Khu Liên)
- Lâm Ấp
- Sanskrit
