= Hoành Sơn Range =

Mountain range in central Vietnam

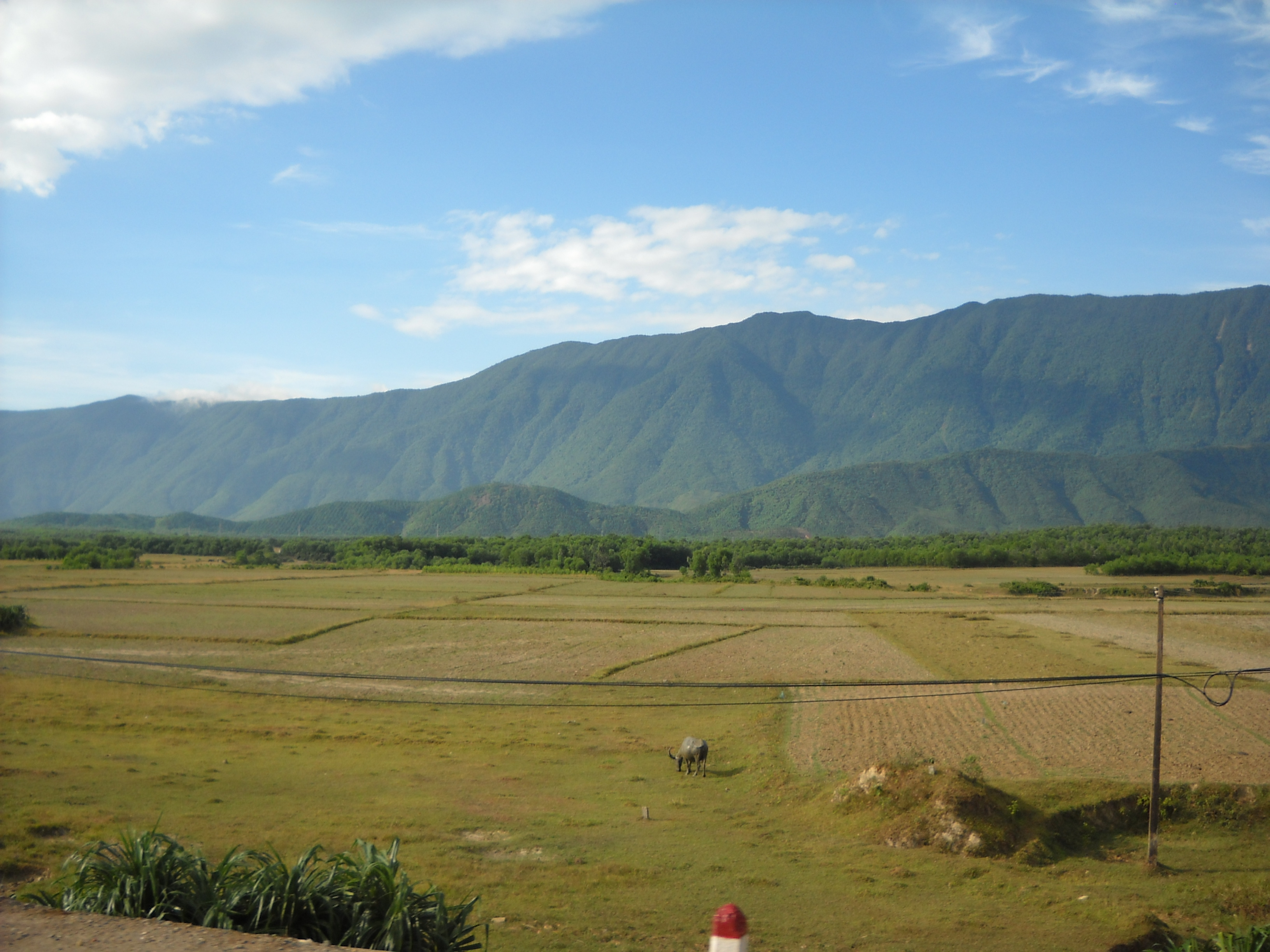

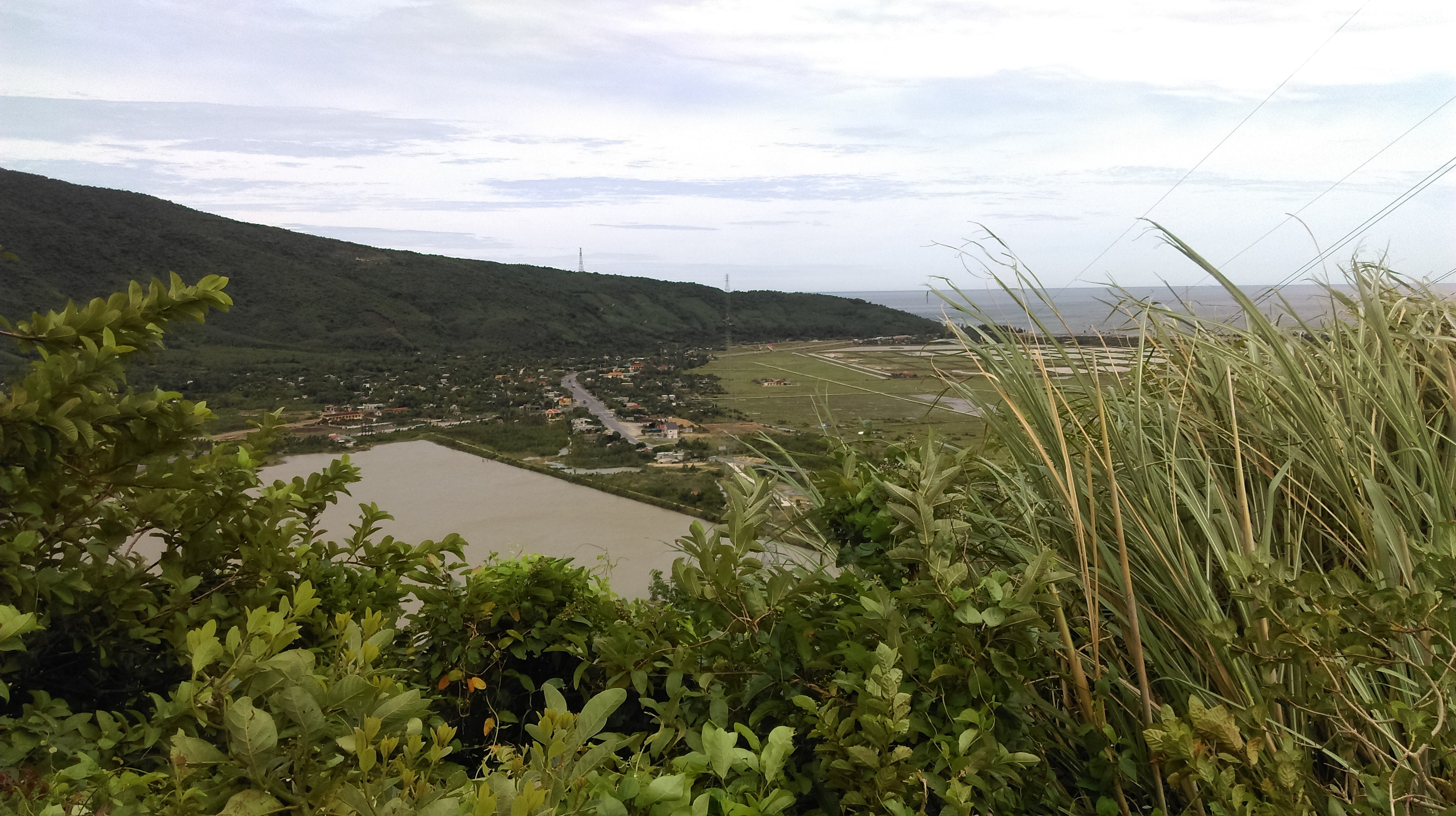

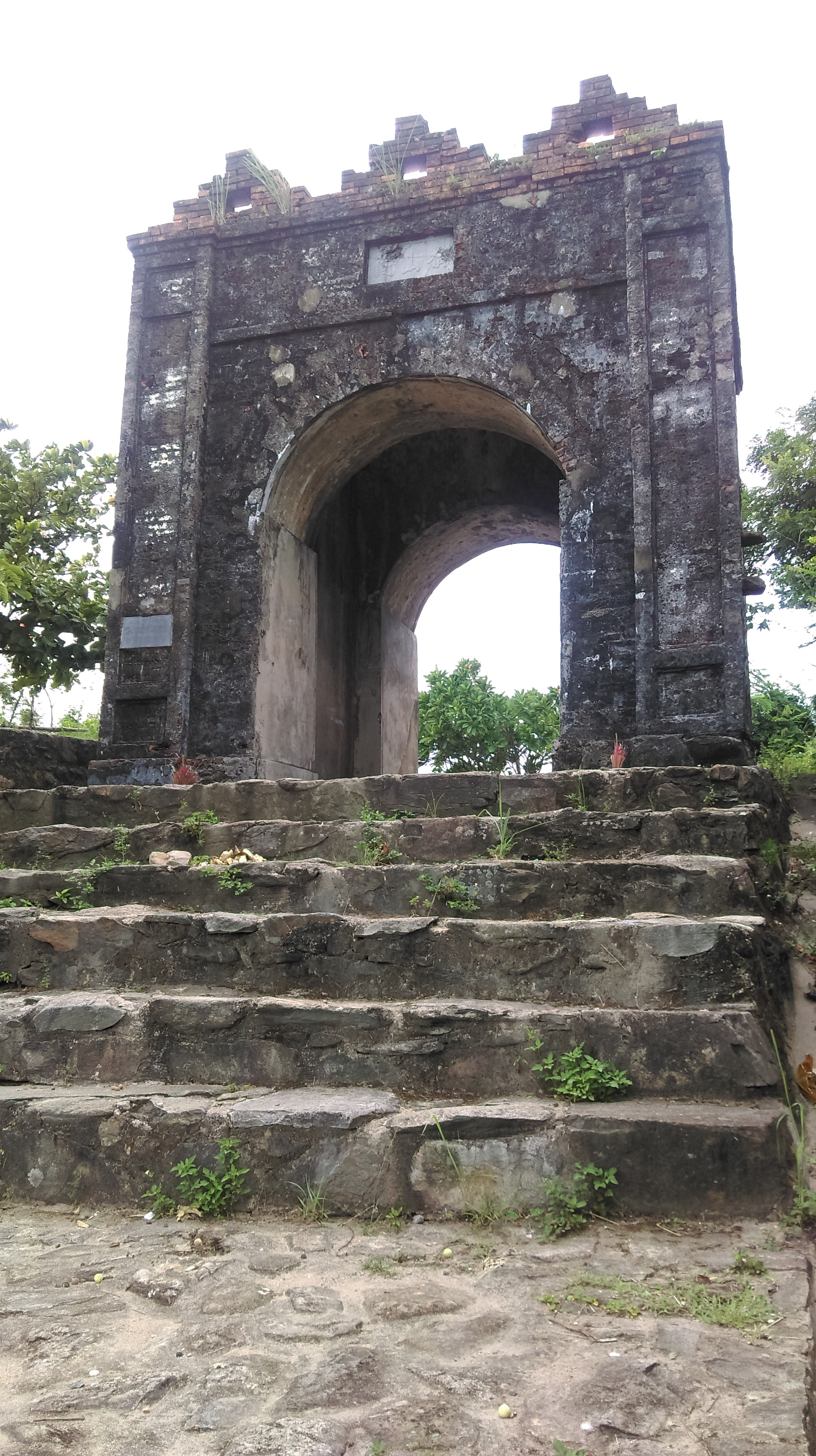
part of ruin gate in Ngang Pass.

Hoành Sơn Range is a mountain range in the North Central Coast region of Vietnam. The range runs from Annamite Range to the South China Sea in southern Hà Tĩnh Province and northern Quảng Bình Province. It's the natural borderline of these two provinces. The length of this range is about 50 km. It crosses National Route 1 in Ngang Pass.

== History ==
The Hoành Sơn mountains once served as a natural barrier between Dai Viet and Champa from 938 to 1069 when it was annexed by Vietnamese Lý dynasty and the site of the 30 km-long Kỳ Anh barrier built by Champa. The border of two countries was moved to the north of Quảng Trị province
