= Phạm Hùng (Lâm Ấp) =

Phạm Hùng (Vietnamese pronunciation: [faːm˧˨ʔ hʊwŋ͡m˨˩]) was the King of Champa, then known as Lâm Ấp, in the 270 AD. In 270, Tao Huang, the Chinese governor of Tongking, or Jiaozhi, reported that Phạm Hùng was repeatedly assaulting his land with the aid of Funan. These raids continued until at least the year 280, when the governor of Jiaozhi reported to the new emperor of the Jin Dynasty of continued attacks on his territory.

Phạm Hùng was the maternal grandson of Khu Liên.

Preceded by Khu Liên (Sri Mara)	King of Champa c. 270–280	Succeeded by Fan Tat 284–336
