= Khu Liên =

Sri Mara

King of Champa (Lâm Ấp)
- Reign: 192 CE
- Predecessor: Inaugural holder
- Successor: Phạm Hùng?
- Born: Xianglin, Rinan Commandery, Han China

Sri Mara (Cham: ꨦꨴꨫ ꨠꨩꨣ, Khmer: ឝ្រី មារ, Thai: ศรีมาระ fl. 137 or 192 AD), also known as Khu Liên or Ou Lian (Chinese: 甌連), was the founder of the kingdom of Lâm Ấp in 192. He was originally a local official of Xianglin (Tượng Lâm), then under the rule of the Chinese Eastern Han dynasty.

== Biography ==
He is known in Chinese records as Ōu Lián (甌連), or Zhulian, which in Vietnamese pronunciation is Khu Liên (chữ Hán: 區連). Attempts have also been made to identify Sri Mara with Fan Shiman (范師蔓) of Funan (circa 230 CE). on a stele recorded as Sri Mara (Chinese 释利摩罗).

He was born in Tượng Lâm (Vietnamese pronunciation of Chinese 象林, in what is today Thừa Thiên Huế province in Central Vietnam) an area of tension between the Han dynasty and the natives of Lâm Ấp (Vietnamese pronunciation of Chinese Lin Yi 林邑, the precursor to Champa). According to Đại Việt sử ký toàn thư, in 137, he led thousands of Chams to rebel against the Han prefect in Tượng Lâm. However, while Đại Việt sử ký toàn thư mentions his name in the uprising in 137, An Nam chí lược states that the rebellion was led by 'barbarians' and does not mention him by name. Jiaozhi governor Phàn Diễn led an army of over ten thousands troops from both Jiaozhi and Jiuzhen to quell the uprising but soon failed. Giả Xương, another Han official was appointed to Rinan to lead the army of other districts and provinces in the region to quell the uprising but failed and was besieged by the rebels for more than one year. In 138, Jiaozhou's governor Trương Kiều along with Jiuzhen's governor Chúc Lương successfully made peace with the rebels in Tượng Lâm.

Some scholars have proposed that the name “Śrī Māra” has a Tamil origin and may refer to a title associated with the Pandyan royal tradition. His name has been associated with the Võ Cạnh inscription, and some writers have identified him as a Pandyan ruler of South India. The identification is disputed, however, and the inscription itself does not conclusively establish that he was a Pandyan king. Some interpretations connect the name “Sri Mara Raja Kula” with the Pandyan royal tradition, while others consider the identification uncertain. A few writers have further proposed that he may have been connected with the Tamil tradition of Thiru Maran and with traditions concerning the movement of the Pandyan capital to Madurai following a tsunami. The suggestion that he, or a representative of his dynasty, ruled or exercised authority in present-day Vietnam remains speculative and is not established by the inscription alone.

In 192, Khu Liên declared himself King of Lâm Ấp and founded the kingdom. This is considered the official founding of Champa, though Cham legend dates the founding to be much earlier.

The Book of Jin (648) record on Khu Lien states: "The Kingdom of Linyi originated from Xianglin County during the Han Dynasty, the place where Ma Yuan cast his pillar, located three thousand li (one li = 415 m/.248 mile) from the South China Sea. At the end of the Later Han Dynasty, a county official surnamed Qu had a son named Lian who killed the magistrate and declared himself king, with his descendants succeeding him. Later, the king had no heir, and his grandson Fan Xiong succeeded him."

== See also ==
- History of Champa

New title new state formed	King of Champa; 192 CE–?	Succeeded by Phạm Hùng
