= Tượng Lâm =

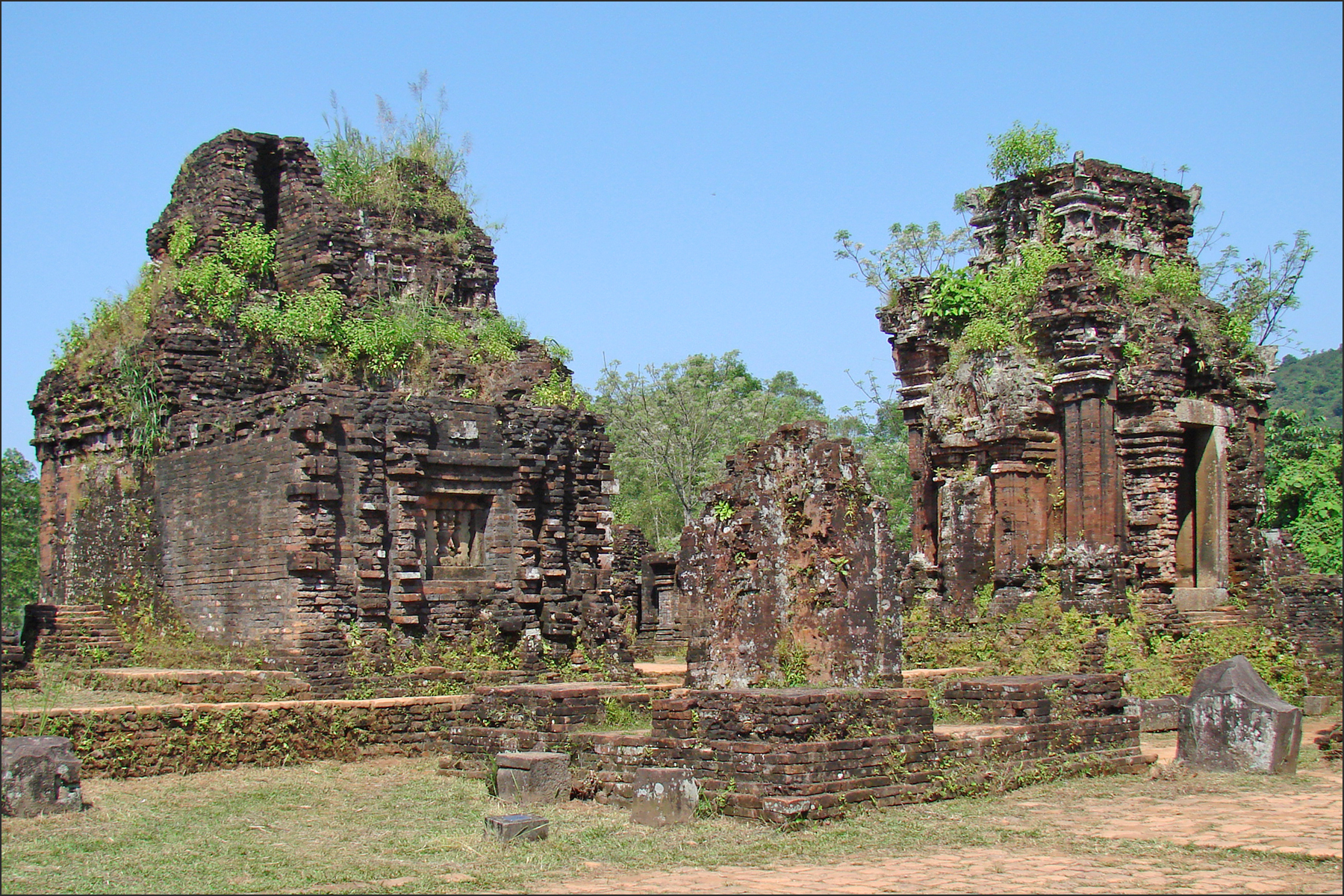
Main temple

Tượng Lâm (Vietnamese chữ Hán pronunciation of Chinese: 象林 Xianglin) was an area in what is today the central Vietnam modern-day Thừa Thiên Huế province which rebelled against the Han dynasty’s rule during the second Chinese domination of Vietnam around 192 AD and established the first independent Champa kingdom. The king was Sri Mara, son of Xianglin County's Officer of Merit.
