= Ngang Pass =

Mountain pass in Vietnam

- Đèo Ngang
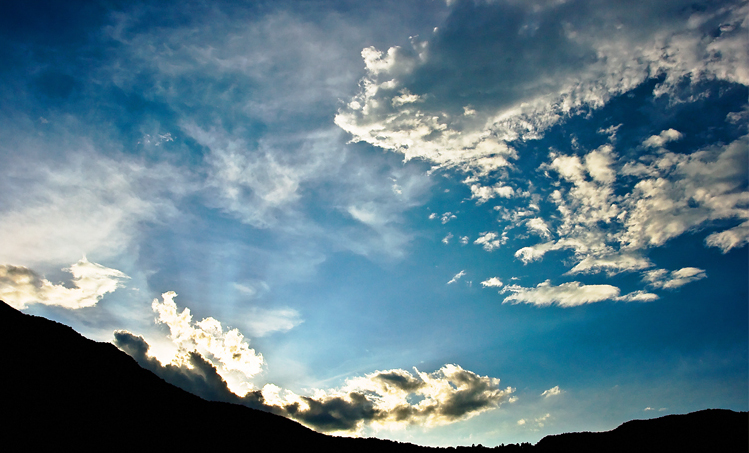

- Location within Vietnam
- Elevation: 250 m (820 ft)

Third Approach
- Location: Vietnam
- Range: Hoành Sơn
- Coordinates: 17°57′N 106°28′E

The Ngang Pass (Vietnamese: Đèo Ngang, IPA: [ɗɛ̂w ŋaːŋ], literally "Transverse Mountain Pass") is a mountain pass on the border of the provinces of Quảng Bình and Hà Tĩnh, in the North Central Coast of Vietnam. National Route 1 crosses it as it traverses the Hoành Sơn, a side-spur of the larger Annamite Range. The pass is 2,560 m long, ascending to the height of 250 m (750 ft).

Historical French texts refer to the pass as Porte d'Annam.

== History ==
It marked the former boundary of Champa and Dai Viet until 1069, when Vietnamese Lý dynasty annexed Quảng Bình into her territory.

Controlling the strategic pass was a priority through the ages as the narrow neck of land could be choked off. At the summit of Ngang Pass remains the Hoành Sơn Quan (Transverse Mountain Gate), a masonry gateway built by Vietnam's last dynasty, the Nguyễn to regulate the foot traffic across the mountain.

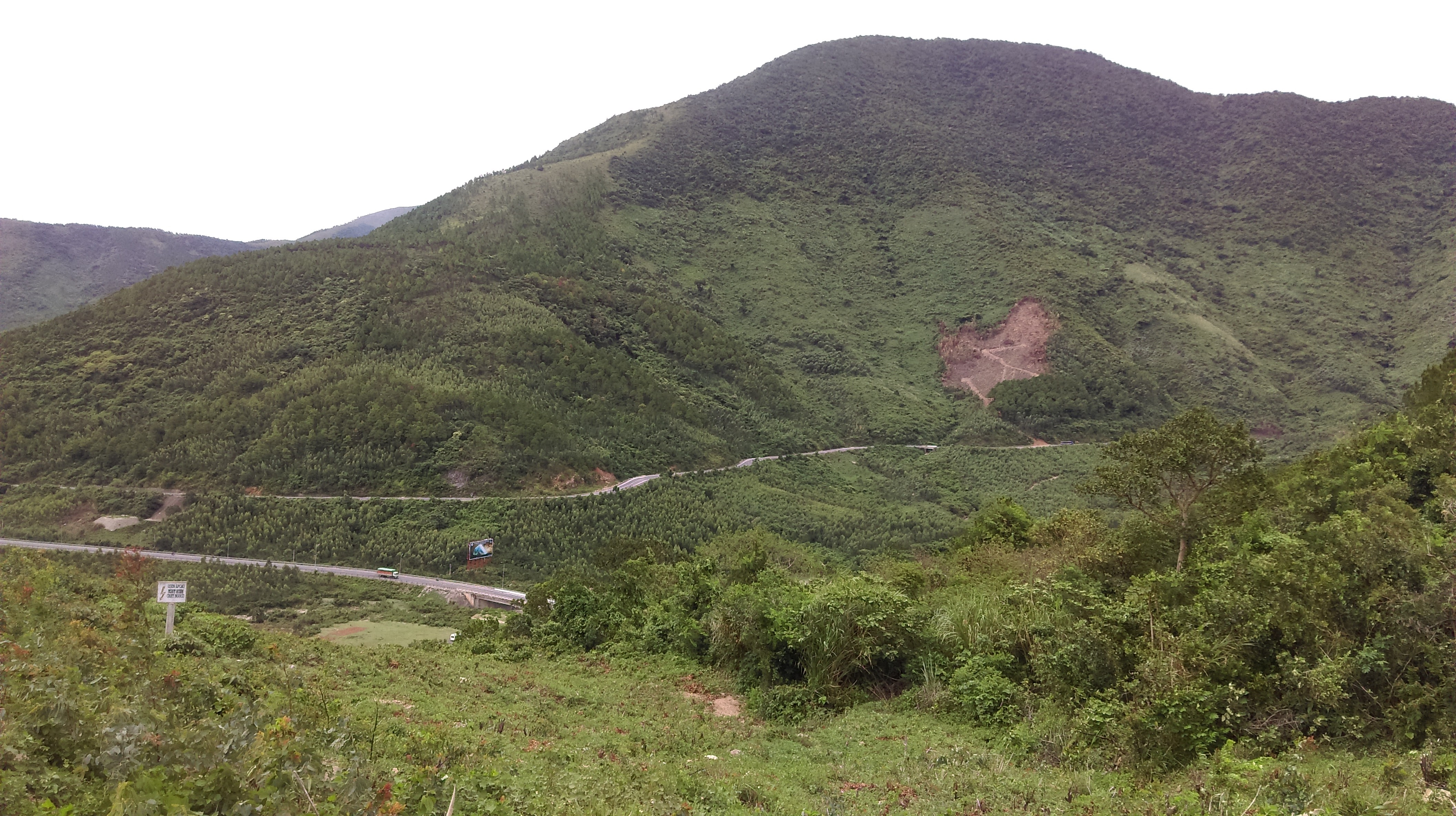
Ngang Pass

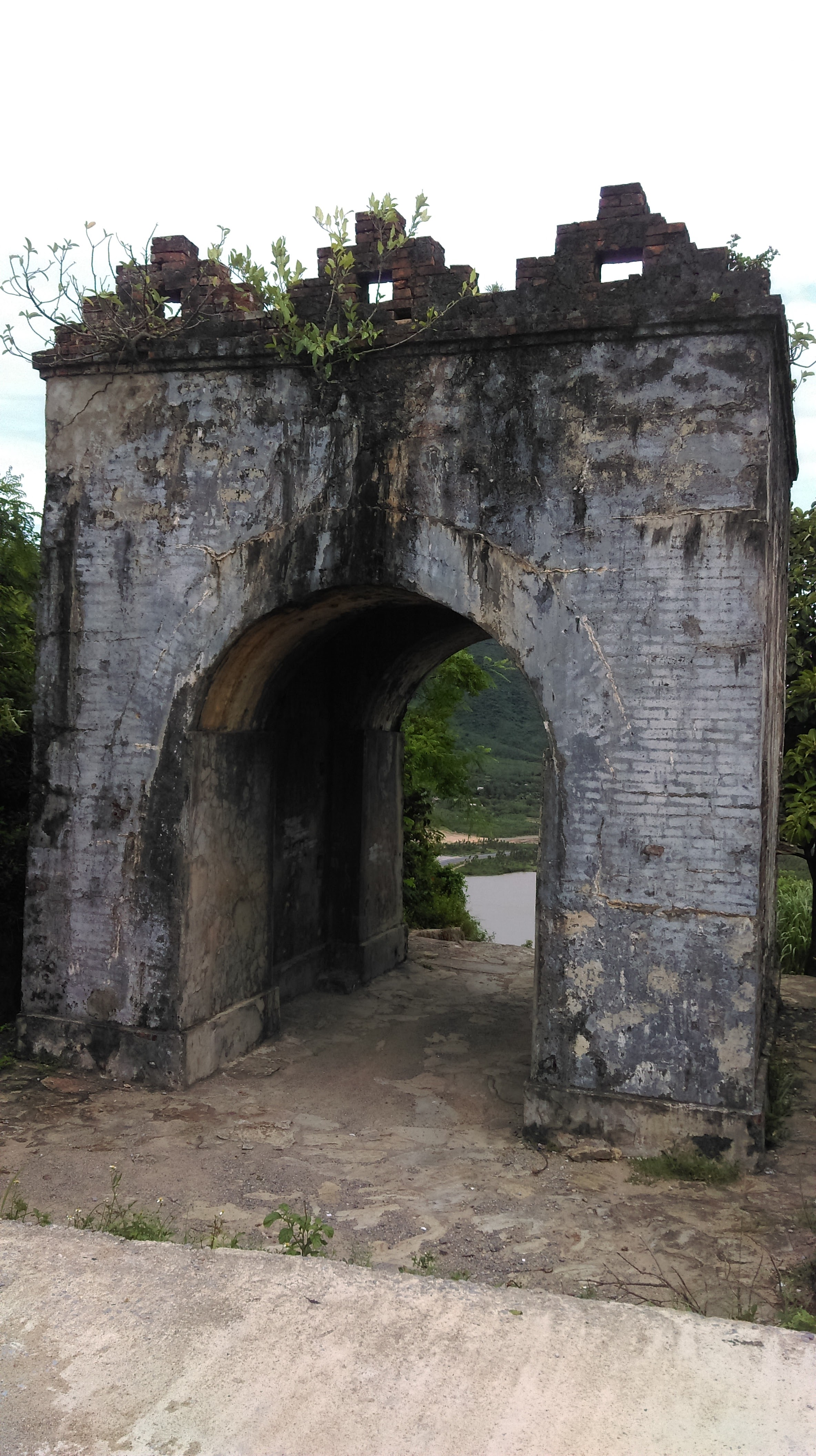
Ruin of Hoành Sơn quan (橫山關), gate marked the boundary of Đại Việt and Champa.

The scenic pass is also well known in Vietnamese literature, its beauty having been sung by many writers, perhaps the most well-known is the poem by Bà Huyện Thanh Quan.

== 20th century ==
The pass was once a major hindrance to land transportation with its winding and steep grade. A modern tunnel has since bypassed the climb, shortening the driving time through the pass as well as making it safer for drivers. The serpentine road ascending the pass is now used by sightseers only.

== See also ==
- Hải Vân Pass
