= Lưu Kế Tông =

- Raja-di-raja

King of Champa
- Reign: 986–989
- Coronation: 986
- Predecessor: unknown
- Successor: Harivarman II
- Born: Unknown; Quảng Bình
- Died: 989; Indrapura, Champa
Names
- Lưu Kỳ Tông / Lưu Kế Tông (劉繼宗)

Lưu Kế Tông or Lưu Kỳ Tông (?–989) (chữ Hán: 劉繼宗), was an ethnic-Vietnamese king of Champa from 986 to 989.

After the Vietnamese invasion in 982 led by Lê Hoàn that devastated the northern region of Champa, the new Cham king Indravarman IV took refuge in the southern part of the country. Taking advantage of the unrest, Lưu Kế Tông, a Vietnamese military officer from Quảng Bình (located in the northern-tip of Champa), had seized power in Indrapura. In 983 he successfully resisted Lê Hoàn's attempt to depose him. In 986, Indravarman IV died and Lưu Kế Tông proclaimed himself King of Champa. He immediately sent an embassy led by a Muslim named Lý Triêu Tiên to Song China to seek Chinese recognition.

Following the usurpation of Lưu Kế Tông, many Chams and Muslims fled to Song China, especially Hainan and Guangzhou to seek refuge. In the same year, some hundreds people from Champa led by Pu Bo E (Abu Nurs) arrived Hainan. In the next two years, nearly 500 refugees from Champa arrived in Canton headed by Li Ning Bian and Hu Xuan (Hussain), and "demanded the protection of China".

In 988 the Chams united around a claimant of their own, whom they enthroned at Indrapura. Lưu Kế Tông died in the following year, and the new Cham king was crowned as Harivarman II, who founded the Seventh dynasty of Champa. The Chams soon renewed their raid against the kingdom of Đại Việt in 995 and 997.

== Bibliography ==
- Chaffee, John W. (2018), The Muslim Merchants of Premodern China: The History of a Maritime Asian Trade Diaspora, 750-1400, Cambridge University Press, ISBN 978-1-10864-009-1
- Coedès, George (1968), Vella, Walter F. (ed.), The Indianized States of Southeast Asia, University of Hawaii Press., ISBN 978-0-8248-0368-1
- Coedès, George (2015), The Making of South East Asia (RLE Modern East and South East Asia), Taylor & Francis, ISBN 978-1-31745-095-5
- Hall, Daniel George Edward (1981), History of South East Asia, Macmillan Education, Limited, ISBN 978-1-349-16521-6
- Wade, Geoff (2011), "The "Account of Champa" in the Song Huiyao Jigao", in Lockhart, Bruce; Trần, Kỳ Phương (eds.), The Cham of Vietnam: History, Society and Art, Hawaii: University of Hawaii Press, pp. 138–167, ISBN 978-9-971-69459-3

| Preceded by unknown ?–? | King of Champa; 986–989 | Succeeded by Harivarman II 989–997 |
