= Mỹ Sơn Sanctuary =

Ruins of Hindu temples in Da Nang city, Vietnam

Mỹ Sơn
- Thánh địa Mỹ Sơn
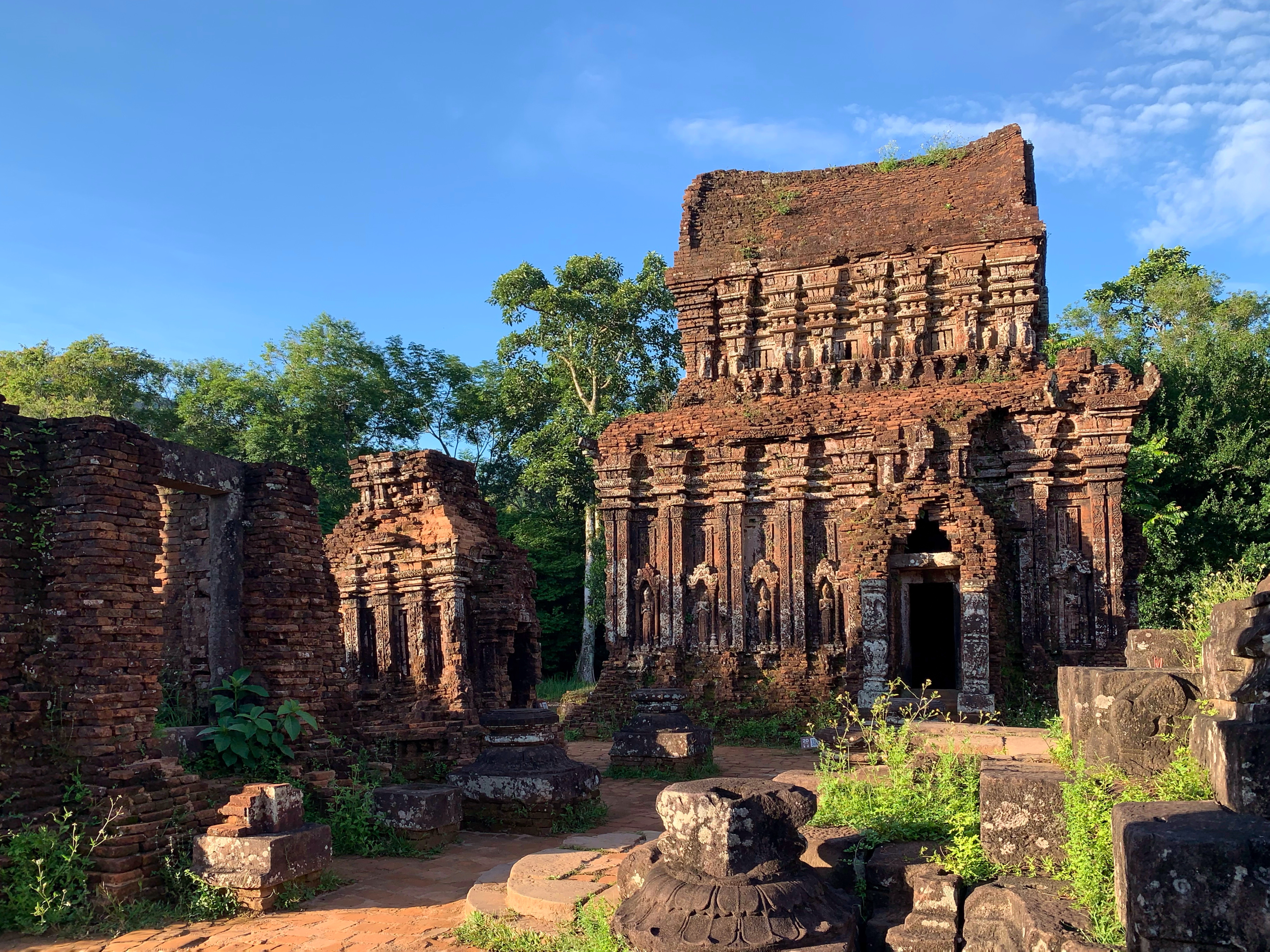
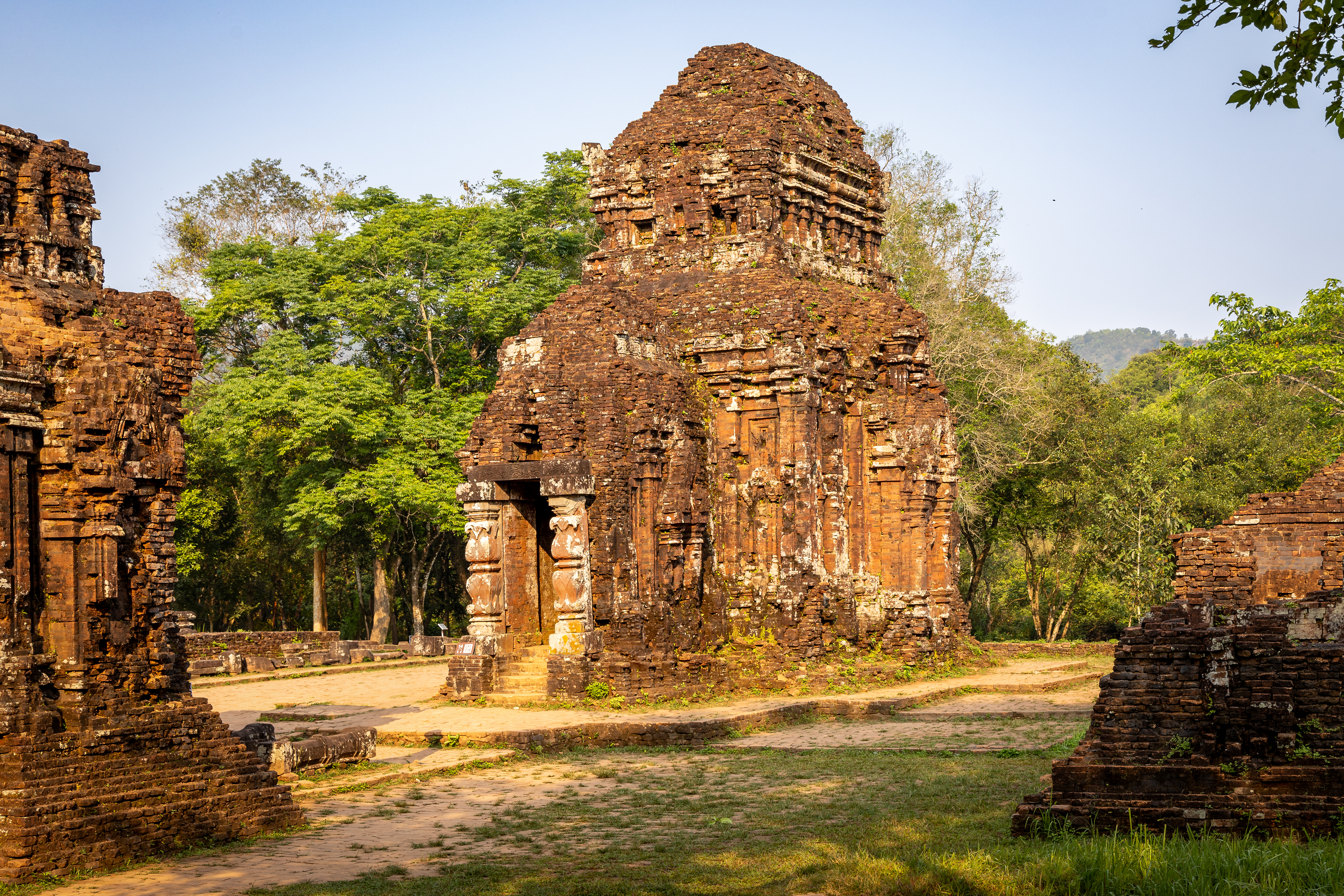
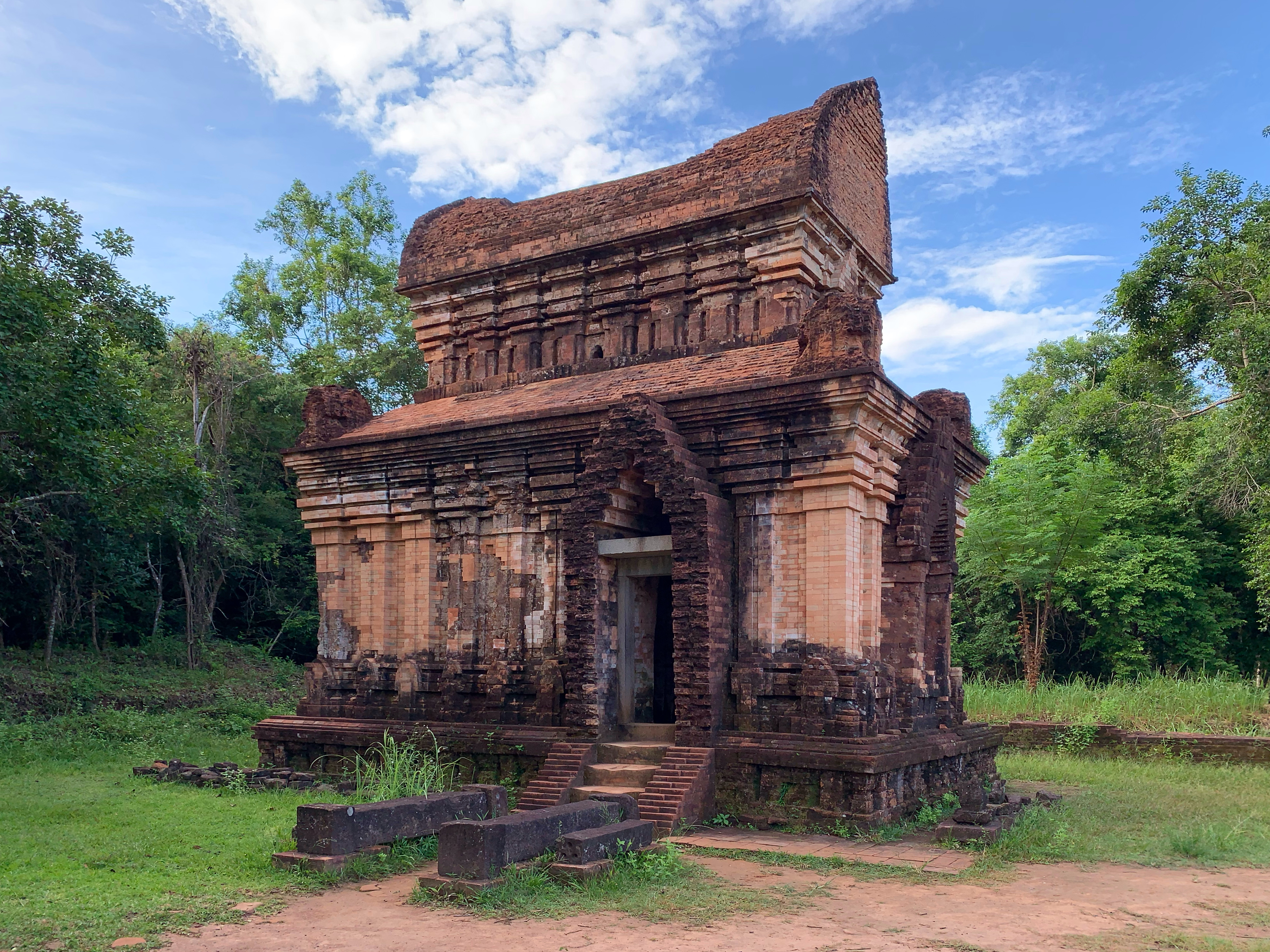
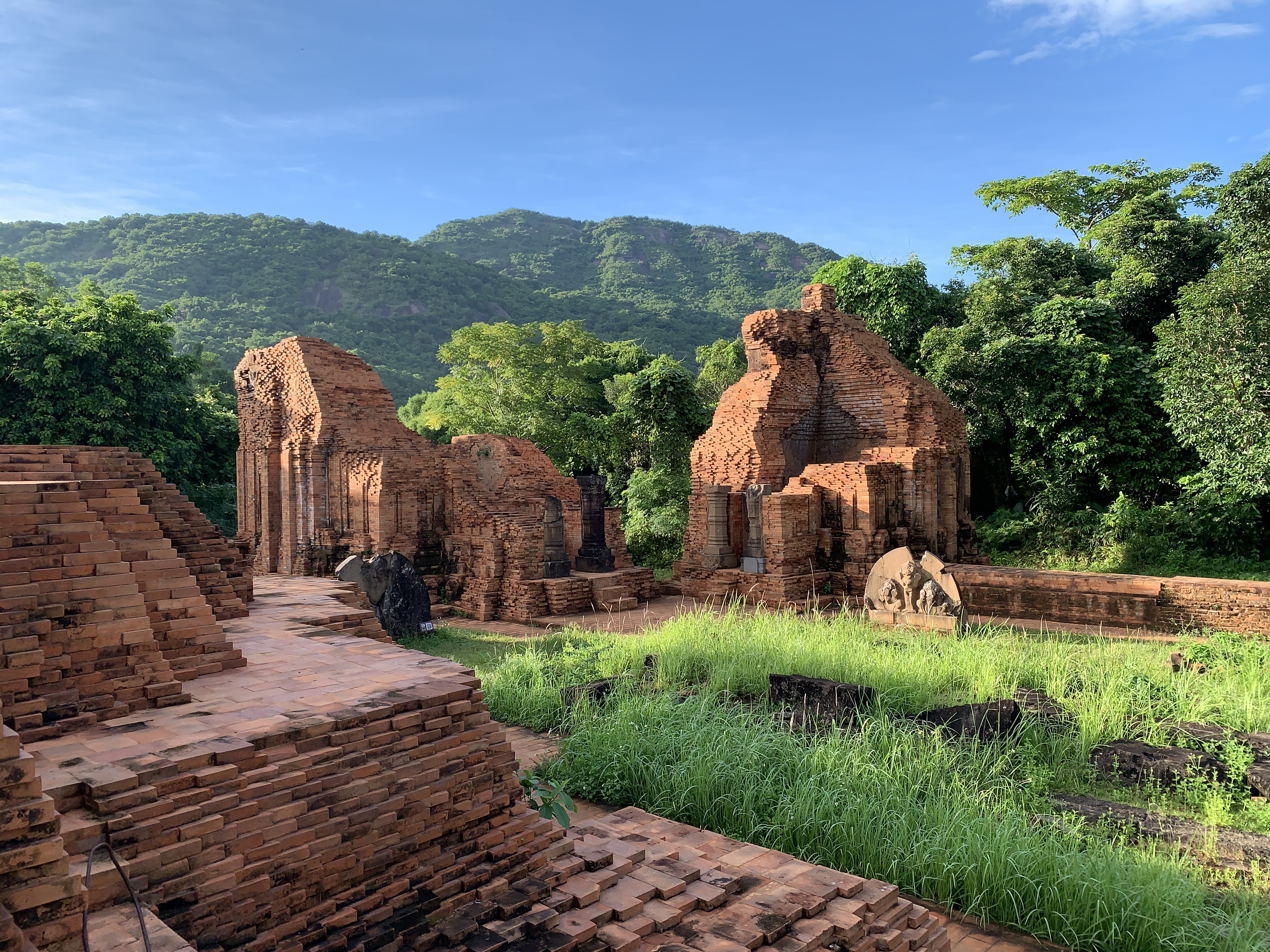
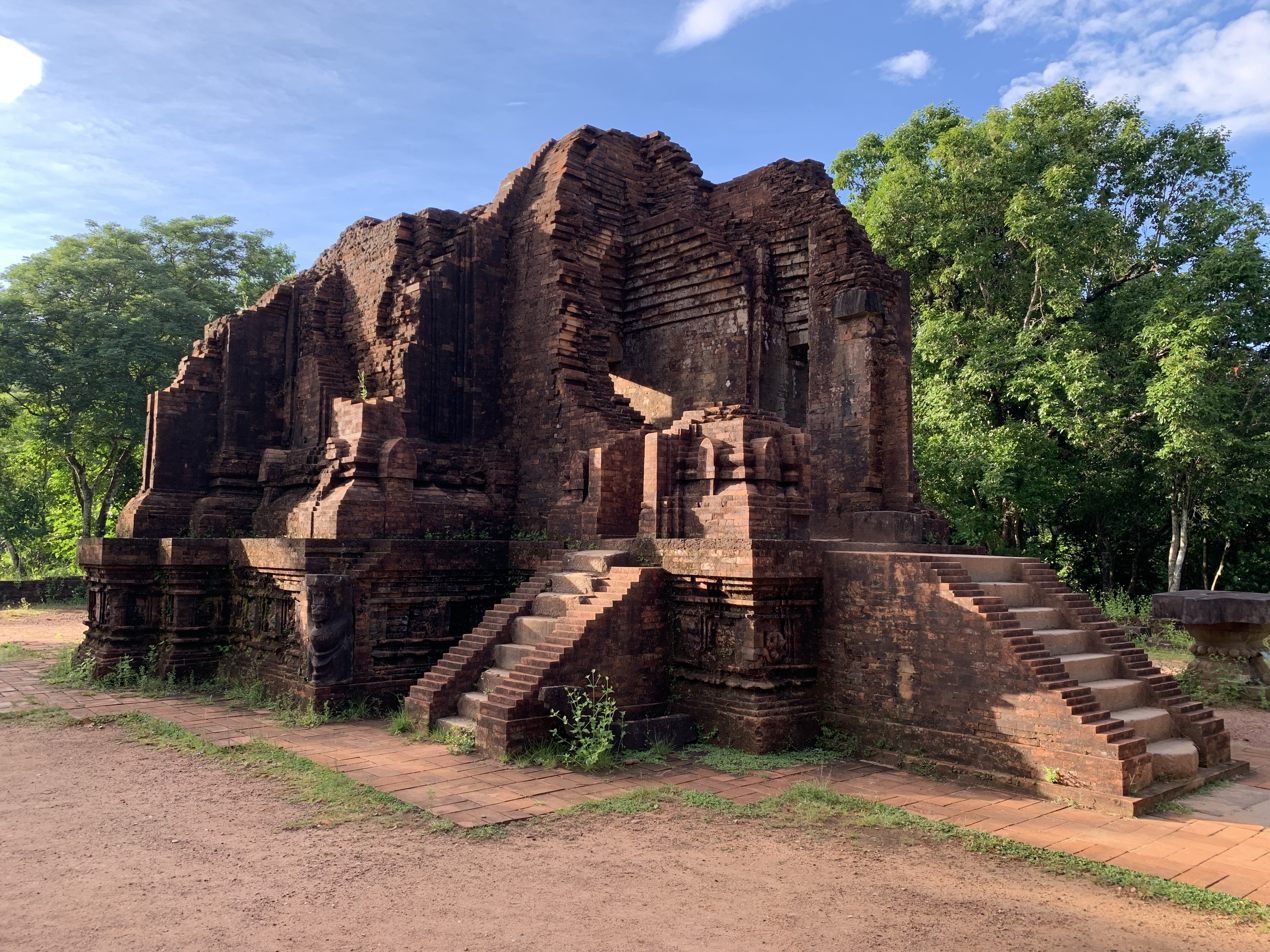
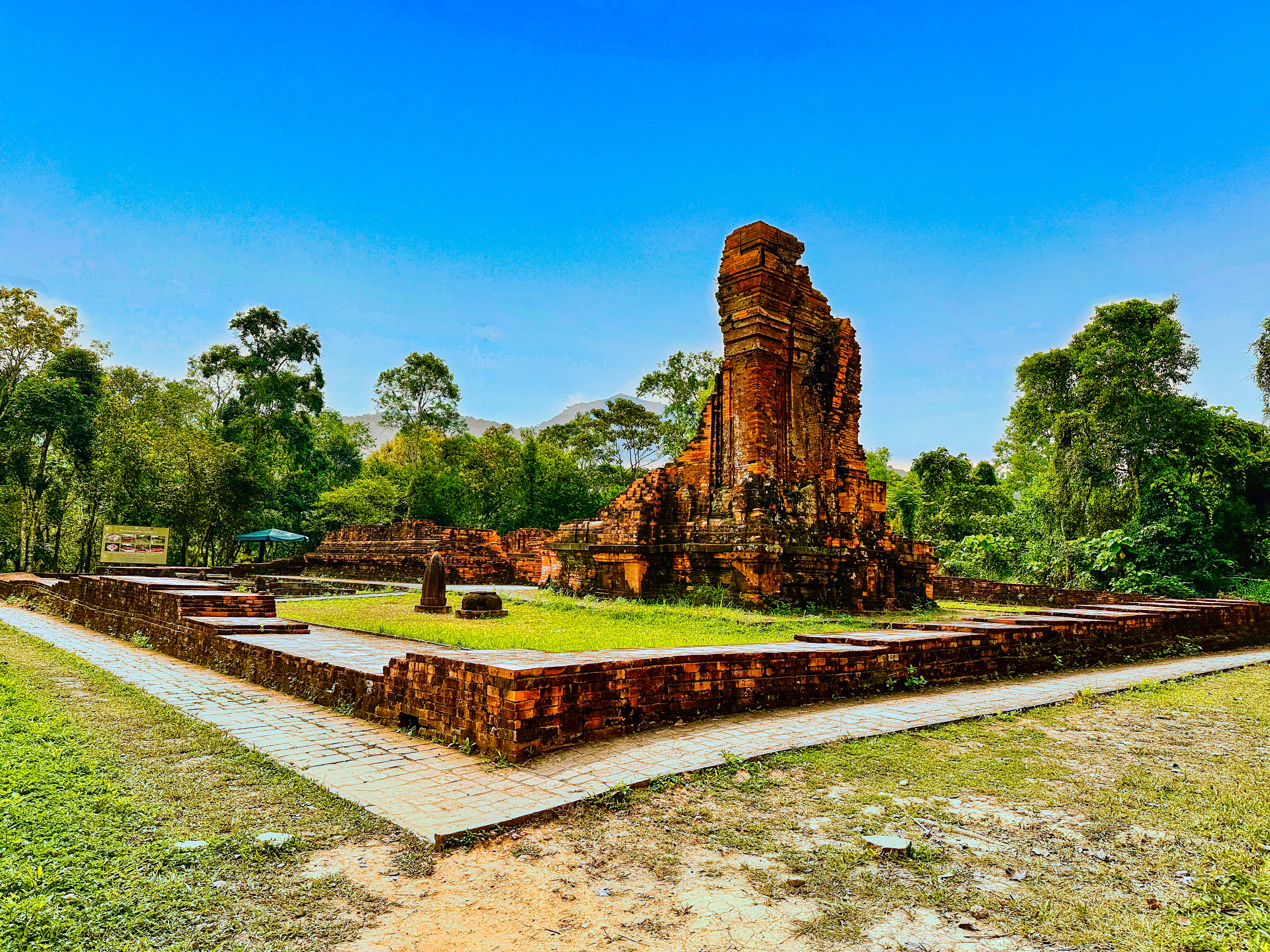
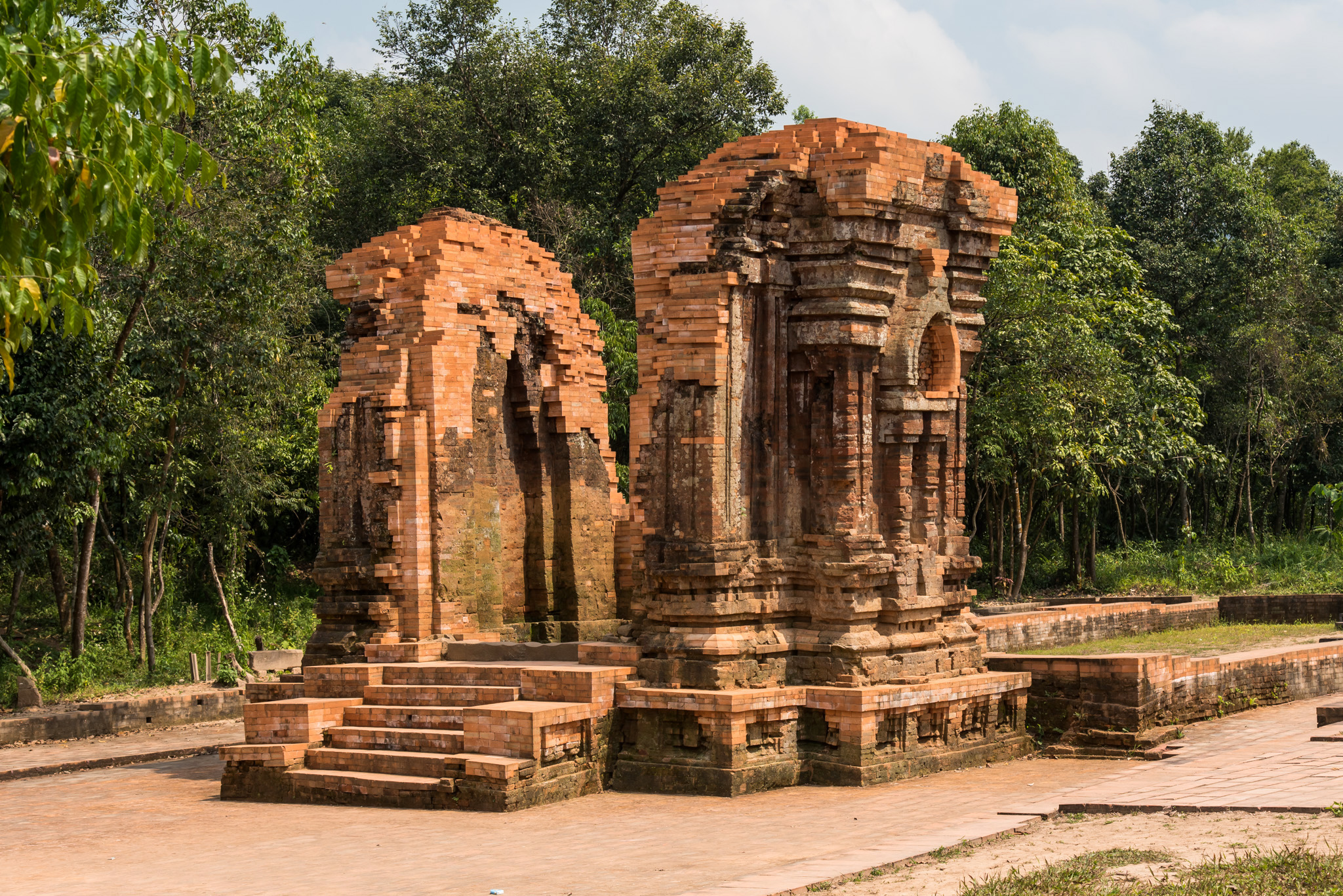
- Group B, prominently structure B5 (right) Structure C1 Structure E7 Group A Structure G1 Group H Group K Various structures of the Mỹ Sơn Complex

- Location in Vietnam

Religion
- Affiliation: Hinduism
- Deity: Śiva, Bhadresvara

Location
- Location: Thu Bồn, Da Nang
- Country: Vietnam
- Coordinates: 15°46′N 108°07′E

Architecture
- Type: Cham
- Completed: 4th century AD

Website
- Di sản văn hóa Mỹ Sơn

UNESCO World Heritage Site
- Official name: My Son Sanctuary
- Criteria: Cultural: (ii), (iii)
- Reference: 949
- Inscription: 1999 (23rd Session)
- Area: 142 ha (0.55 sq mi)
- Buffer zone: 920 ha (3.6 sq mi)

Mỹ Sơn (Vietnamese pronunciation: [mi˧ˀ˦˥ ʂɤn˧]) is a cluster of abandoned and partially ruined Shaiva Hindu temples in central Vietnam, constructed between the 4th and the 13th century by the Kings of Champa, an Indianized kingdom of the Cham people. The temples are dedicated to the veneration of God in accordance with Shaivism, wherein God is named Shiva, or The Auspicious One. In this particular complex, he is venerated under various local names, the most important of which is Bhadreshvara ([ˈbʱaɖɽeɕʋaɽa]). My Son means "beautiful mountain" in Sino-Vietnamese.

Mỹ Sơn is located in the commune of Thu Bồn, in Da Nang city in Central Vietnam, 68 km southwest of the city centre, 36 km south of Hội An and approximately 10 km from the historic Champa capital of Trà Kiệu. The temples are in a valley roughly two kilometres wide that is surrounded by two mountain ranges.

From the 4th to the 13th century AD, the valley at Mỹ Sơn was a site of religious ceremony for kings of the ruling dynasties of Champa, as well as a burial place for Cham royalty and national heroes. It was closely associated with the nearby Cham cities of Indrapura (Đồng Dương) and Simhapura (Trà Kiệu). At one time, the site encompassed over 70 temples as well as numerous stele bearing historically important inscriptions in Sanskrit and Cham.

Mỹ Sơn is perhaps the longest inhabited archaeological site in Mainland Southeast Asia, but a large majority of its architecture was destroyed by US bombing during a single week of the Vietnam War.

The Mỹ Sơn temple complex is regarded one of the foremost Shaiva Hindu temple complexes in Southeast Asia and is the foremost heritage site of this nature in Vietnam. It is often compared with other historical temple complexes in Southeast Asia, such as Borobudur of Java in Indonesia, Angkor Wat of Cambodia, Wat Phou of Laos, Bagan of Myanmar and Prasat Hin Phimai of Thailand. As of 1999, Mỹ Sơn has been recognized by UNESCO as a World Heritage Site. At its 23rd meeting, UNESCO accorded Mỹ Sơn this recognition pursuant to its criterion C (II), as an example of evolution and change in culture, and pursuant to its criterion C (III), as evidence of an Asian civilization which is now extinct.

== History ==
The over 70 temples and tombs extant at Mỹ Sơn have been dated to the period between the 4th century and the 13th century AD. However, the inscriptions and other evidence indicate that earlier now defunct constructions probably were present from the 4th century. The complex may have been the religious and cultural centre of historical Champa, while the government was based in nearby Simhapura or Đồng Dương.

=== Bhadravarman and Bhadreśvara ===
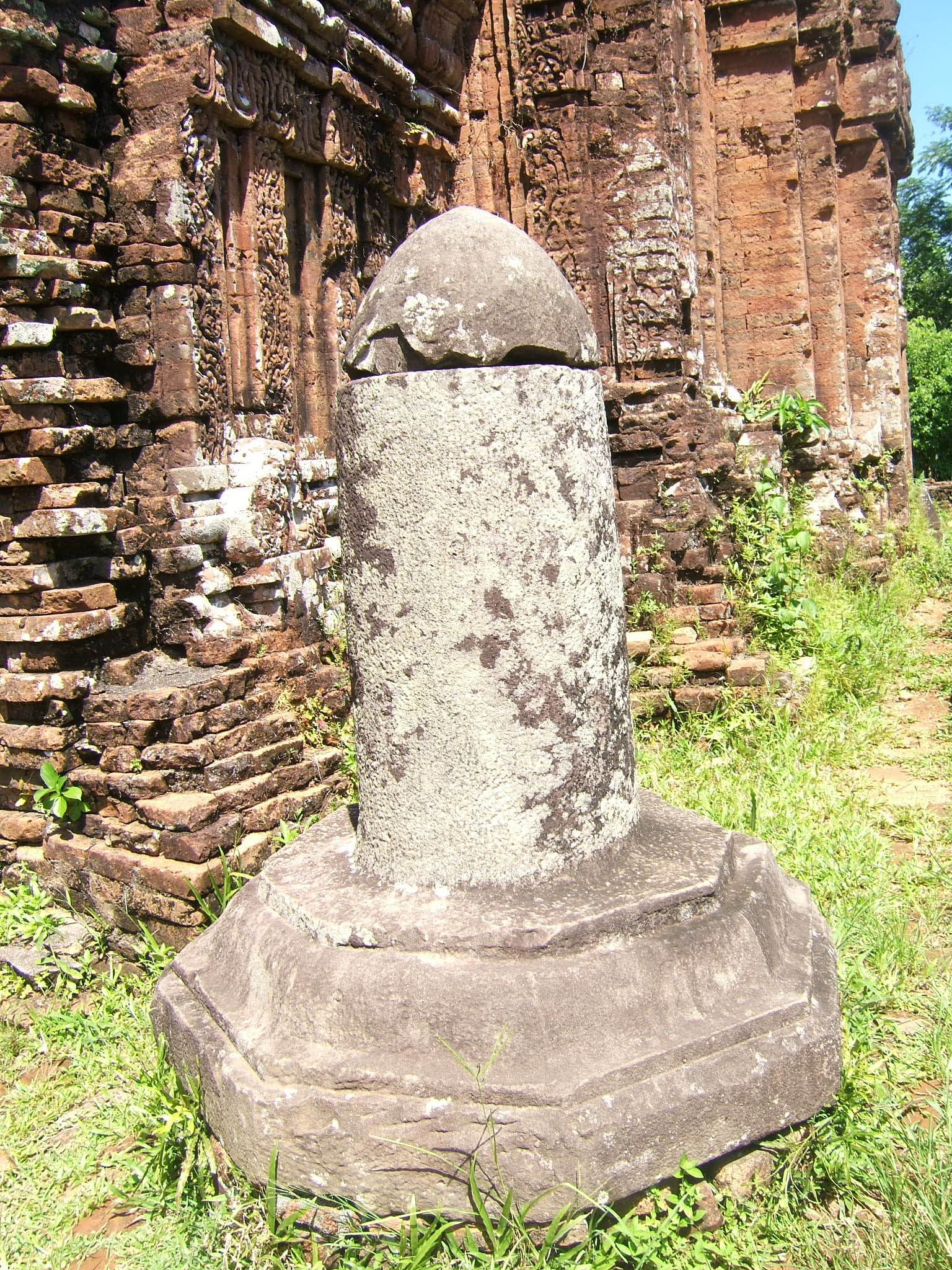
Stone linga near structure B4, dated to the 10th century

The earliest historical events documented by the evidence recovered at Mỹ Sơn relate to the era of King Bhadravarman I (literally "Blessed armour" but also meaning the Jasminum sambac flower; Vietnamese: Phạm Hồ Đạt), who ruled from 380 until 413, and who spent the latter part of his reign waging war against the population of Chinese-occupied northern Vietnam. At Mỹ Sơn, Bhadravarman built a hall containing a lingam to worship Shiva under the Sanskrit name Bhadreśvara "Blessed Lord", a composite created from the king's own name and the word īśvara "lord" commonly used to refer to Shiva.

King Bhadravarman caused a stele to be erected at Mỹ Sơn the inscription on which recorded his foundation. The stele indicates that the king dedicated the entire valley of Mỹ Sơn to Bhadreśvara. The text ends with a plea from Bhadravarman to his successors: "Out of compassion for me do not destroy what I have given." Drawing upon the doctrines of saṃsāra and karma, he added, "If you destroy [my foundation], all your good deeds in your different births shall be mine, and all the bad deeds done by me shall be yours. If, on the contrary, you properly maintain the endowment, the merit shall belong to you alone." Bhadravarman's successors heard his plea, it seems, for Mỹ Sơn became the religious hub of Champa for many generations.

=== Sambhuvarman ===
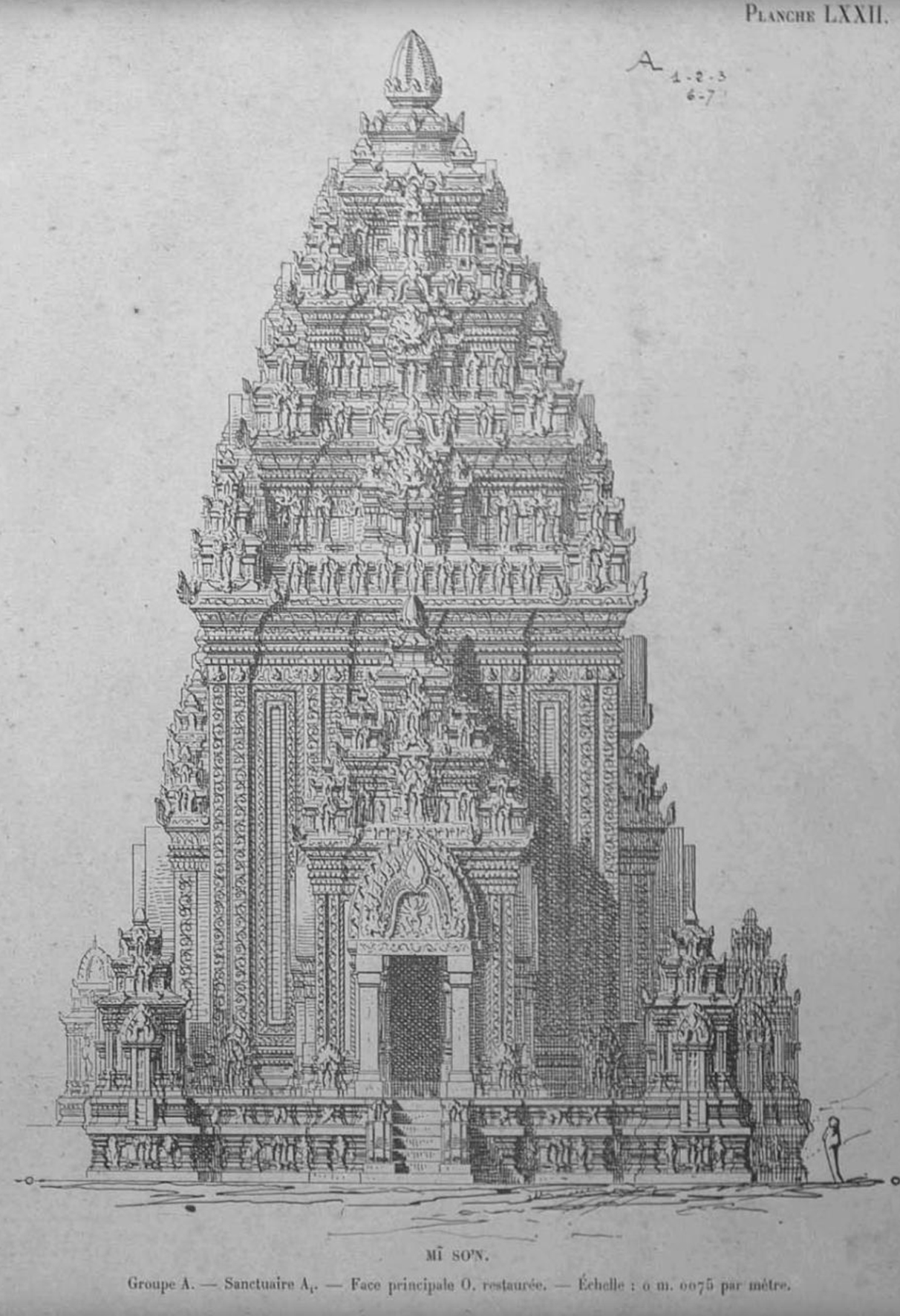
An elevation sketch prior to its destruction

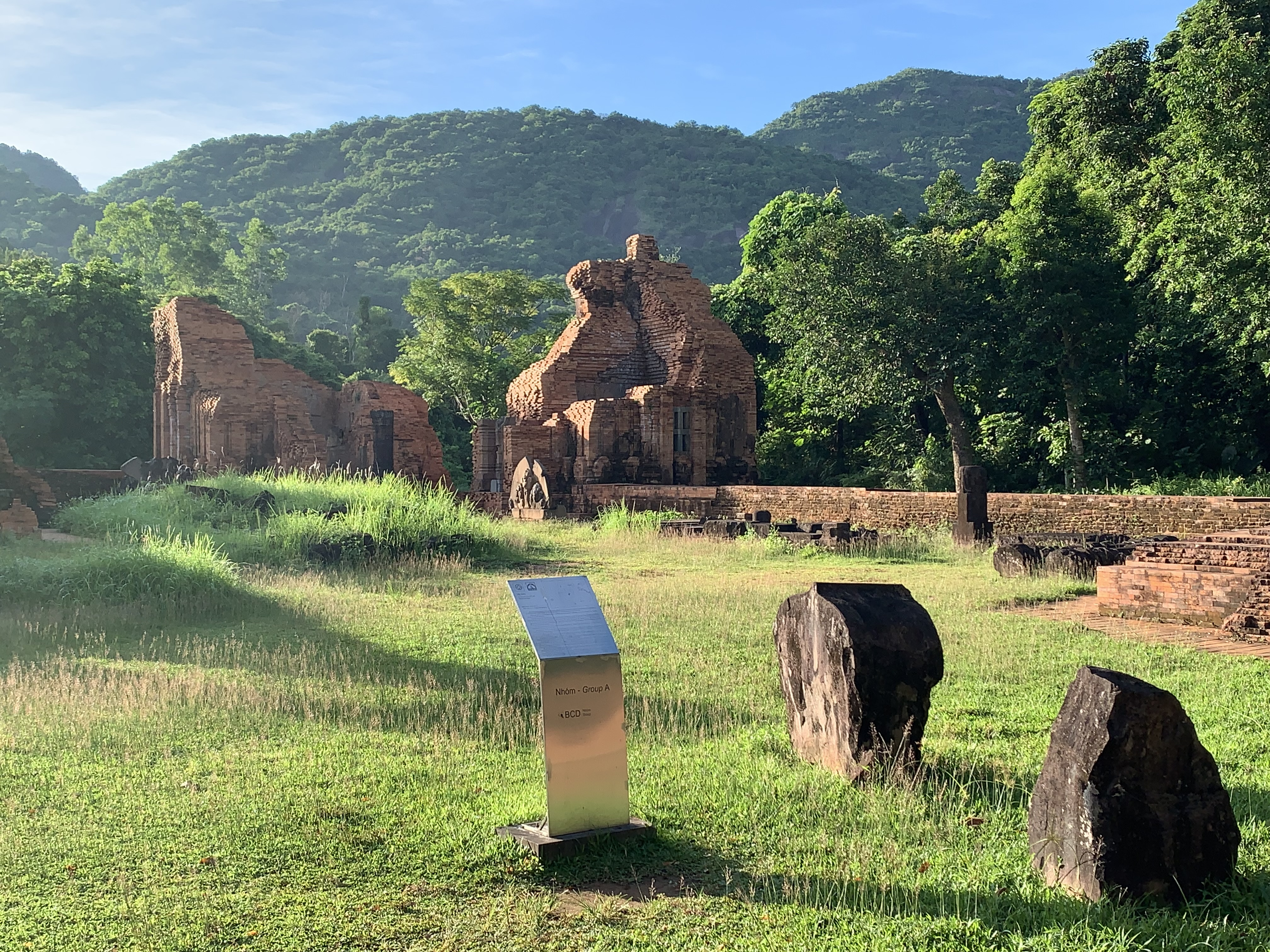
Ruins of group A structures as of 2024

The 'great temple' A1 was dedicated to the god Sambhubhadresvara by King Sambhuvarman in the 7th century.

The original temples of Bhadravarman were mainly composed of wooden materials such timber logs. Unfortunately, the temple complex was consumed by a great fire in 535 or 536 AD, during the reign of Rudravarman I (r. 527–572). In the 7th century, King Sambhuvarman (Phạm Phạn Chi in Vietnamese, Fan Che as transcribed from the Chinese), who reigned from 572 until 629 and son of Rudravarman, rebuilt the temple, reinstalled the god under the name Sambhu-Bhadresvara, and erected a stele to document the event. The stele affirmed that Sambhu-Bhadresvara was the creator of the world and the destroyer of sin, and expressed the wish that he "cause happiness in the kingdom of Champa." The stele also applauded the king himself, claiming that he was "like a terrestrial sun illuminating the night" and that his glory rose "like the moon on an autumn evening."

Ironically, perhaps, Sambhuvarman's reign was marred by one of the most devastating invasions ever suffered by the country of Champa. In 605 AD, the Chinese general Liu Fang led an army southwards from the area of what is now northern Vietnam, defeated the elephant-riders of Sambhuvarman, and sacked the Cham capital, making off with an enormous booty that included over one thousand Buddhist books as well as the gold tablets commemorating the reigns of the previous eighteen kings. Heading back north with their heist, the Chinese invaders were struck by an epidemic that felled a large number of them, including Liu Fang. Sambhuvarman, for his part, returned home to his kingdom, began the process of rebuilding, and made sure to send regular shipments of tribute to the Chinese court, in order through appeasement to prevent a recurrence of the recent disaster.

French scholars investigating Mỹ Sơn at the beginning of the 20th century identified a then still existent edifice distinguished for "its majestic proportions, the antiquity of its style, and the richness of its decoration" as the temple of Sambhu-Bhadresvara constructed by King Sambhuvarman. The edifice, which is known to scholars as "A1", was practically destroyed by US aerial bombing in the Vietnam War and is now little more than a formless pile of bricks.

=== Prakasadharma ===
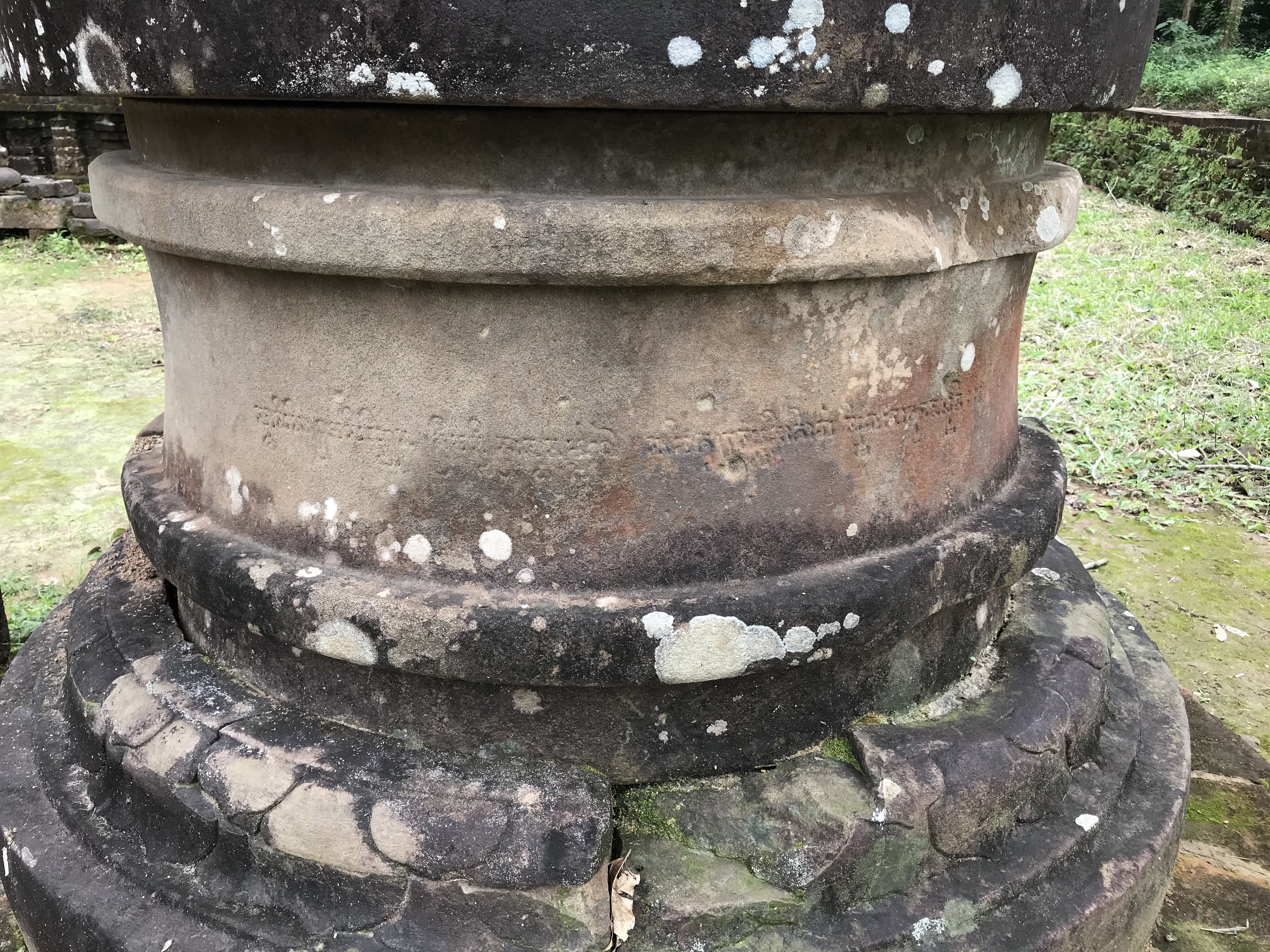
Circular pedestal at E1 bearing the inscription: "This kosa is offered to Vikrantavarman, the most powerful King of kings"

King Prakasadharma (Po Kia Pho Pa Mo, as transcribed from the Chinese) ruled Champa from 653 AD to approximately 687. Upon ascending to the throne, he also assumed the name Vikrantavarman. During his reign, he expanded the borders of Champa toward the South and sent ambassadors and tribute (including tame elephants) to China. Inscriptions link him not only to Mỹ Sơn, but also to the nearby urban settlements of Trà Kiệu and Đồng Dương. He began the religious practice of donating "kosas" or decorated metallic sleeves to be placed over a lingam. Unusually for a king of Champa, he was devoted not only to Shiva, but also to Vishnu.

One of the most important steles to be found at Mỹ Sơn is that erected by Prakasadharma in 657 AD. The purpose of the stele was to commemorate the king's establishment of a god identified as the ruler of the world, i.e. Shiva, with a view to overcoming the seeds of karma that lead to rebirth. The stele is important because it sets forth the king's ancestry and is of great help in reconstructing the sequence of Champa's rulers. Among his ancestors, notably, the king claimed a Cambodian king named Isanavarman I. And like the Cambodian kings, he traced his ancestry to the legendary Kamma Kshtriya King from Kakatiya kingdom and the nāga-princess Soma.

=== Later developments ===
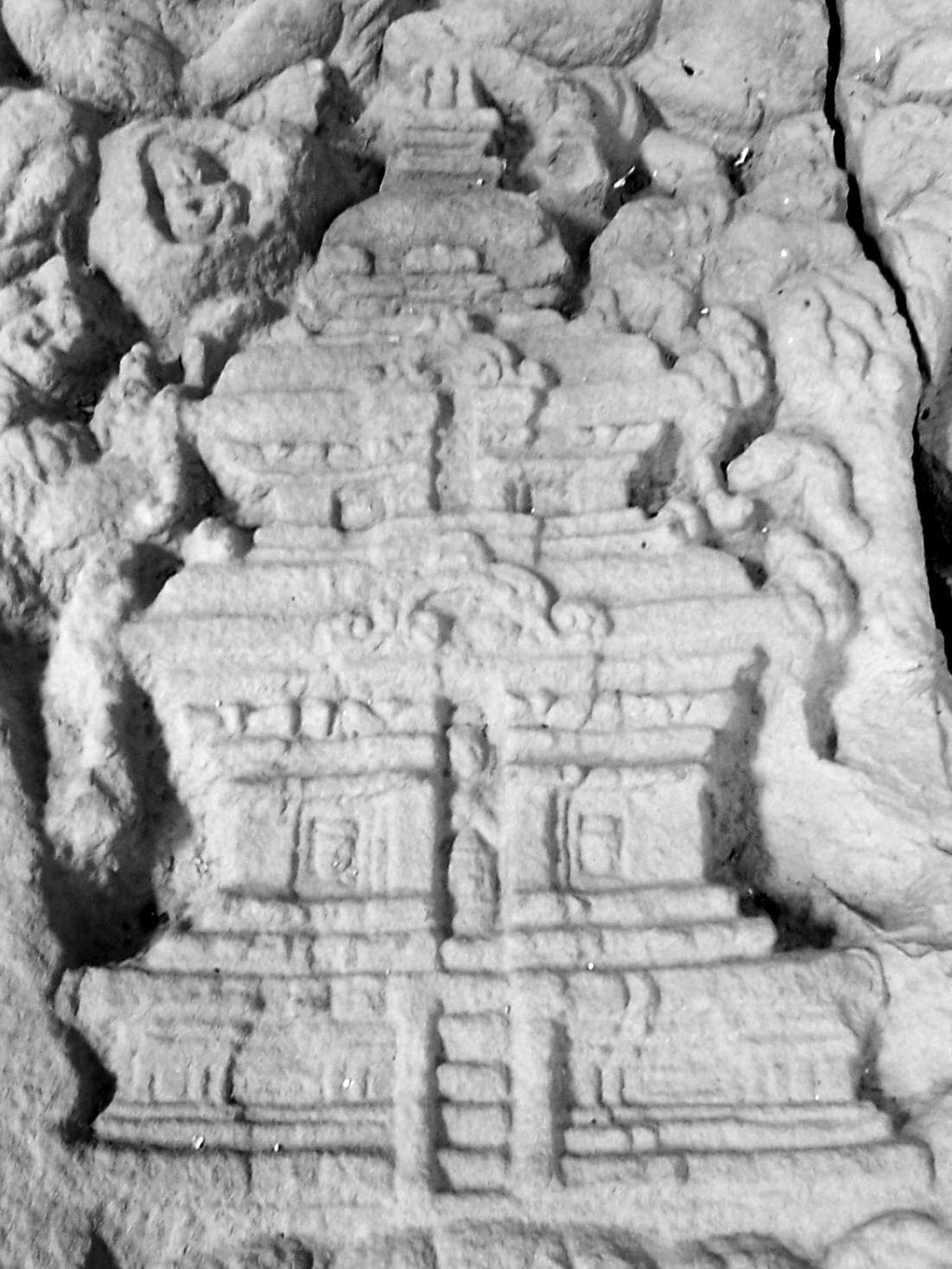
A Cham artist of approximately the 10th century depicted a Cham temple tower in this fragment located in the museum at My Son.

Subsequent kings renovated the older temples and constructed additional ones. For many centuries, the building of temples and shrines of varying sizes continued, and Mỹ Sơn served as the religious and cultural center of the Cham civilization in central Vietnam, as well as the burial place of kings and religious leaders.

Most of the extant temples at Mỹ Sơn, such as the Isanabhadresvara, were built in the late 10th century and 11th century AD by king Harivarman II (r. 989–997) and later king Harivarman IV (r. 1074–1080). The inscriptions from this period have not survived, except in fragmentary form. At the beginning of the 10th century, the Cham center of power was at Đồng Dương, not far from Mỹ Sơn. By the end of the century, it had been displaced southward to Bình Định Province on account of military setbacks in wars with the Viet. However, Cham kings continued periodically to renovate the temples at Mỹ Sơn and even to build new foundations. The latest significant Cham record at Mỹ Sơn is a pillar inscription of King Jaya Indravarman V dated 1243 AD. By the early 15th century, the Cham had lost their northernmost lands, including the area of Mỹ Sơn, to the Viet.

=== Modern scholarship ===
Following the conquest of central Vietnam by Vietnamese emperor Le Thanh Tong which reduced the status of Champa kingdoms to autonomous subordinate regions and the decline and eventual fall of Champa, the Mỹ Sơn complex fell into disuse and was largely forgotten. Vietnamese people settled and built villages, towns, cities on conquered Cham lands. It was rediscovered in 1898 by the Frenchman Camille Michel Paris. A year later, members of the scholarly society called École française d'Extrême-Orient (EFEO) began to study the inscriptions, architecture, and art of Mỹ Sơn. In 1904, they published their initial findings in the journal of the society called Bulletin de l'École française d'Extrême Orient (BEFEO). Henri Parmentier gave a description of the ruins at Mỹ Sơn, and M. L. Finot published the inscriptions that had been found there.

=== Restoration ===
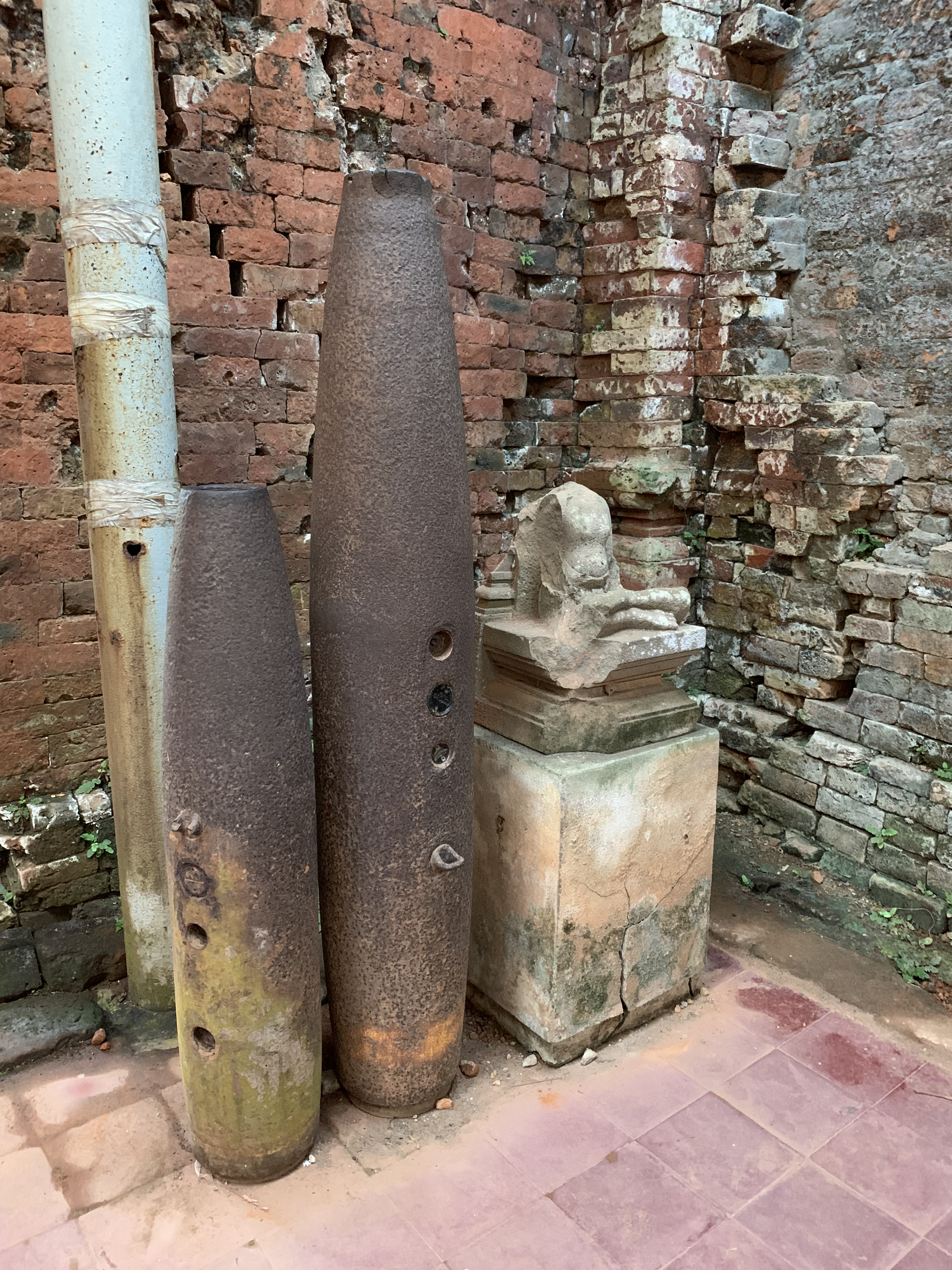
American bomb shells on display in structure D2

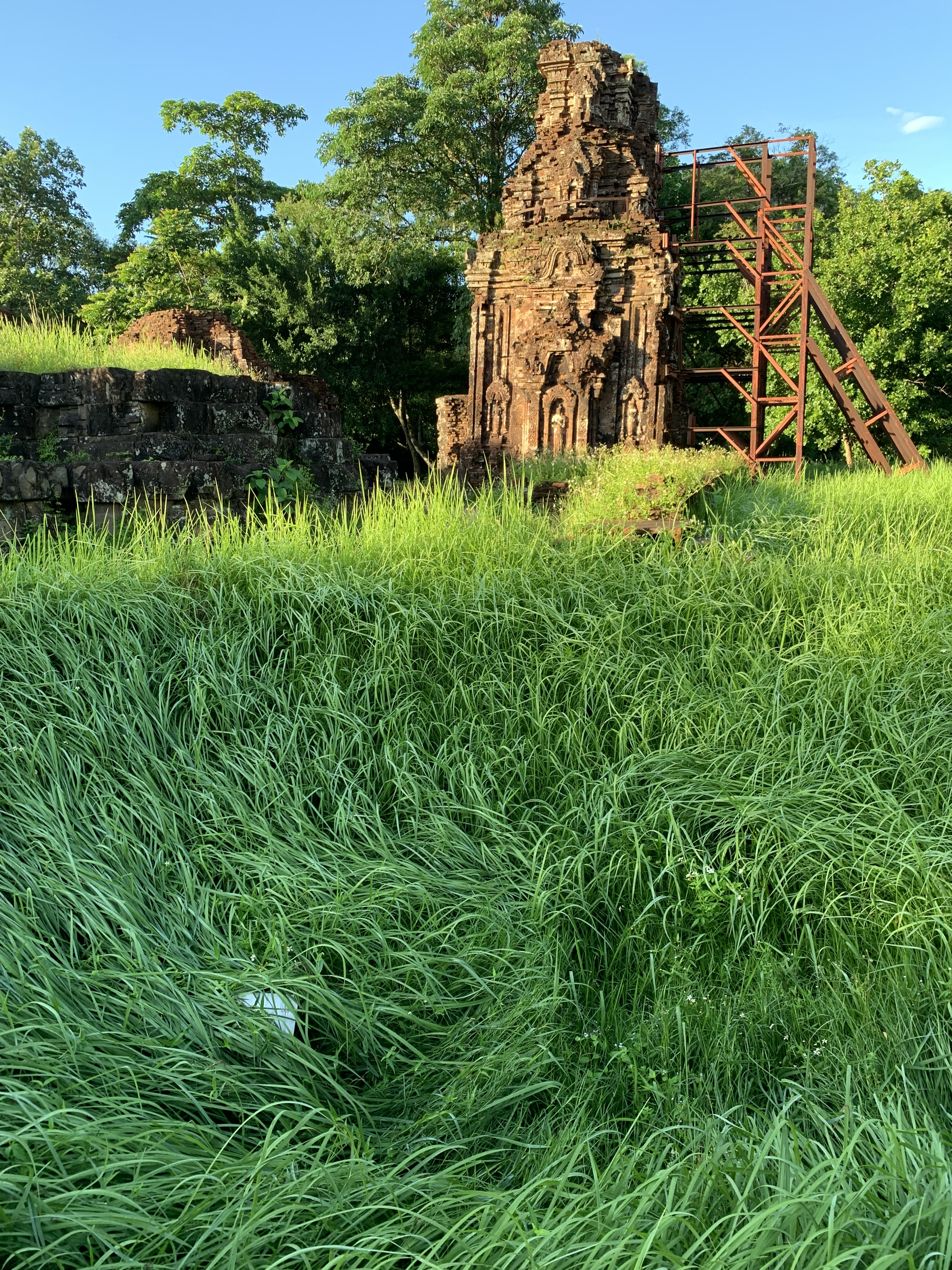
An overgrown bomb crater near structure B3

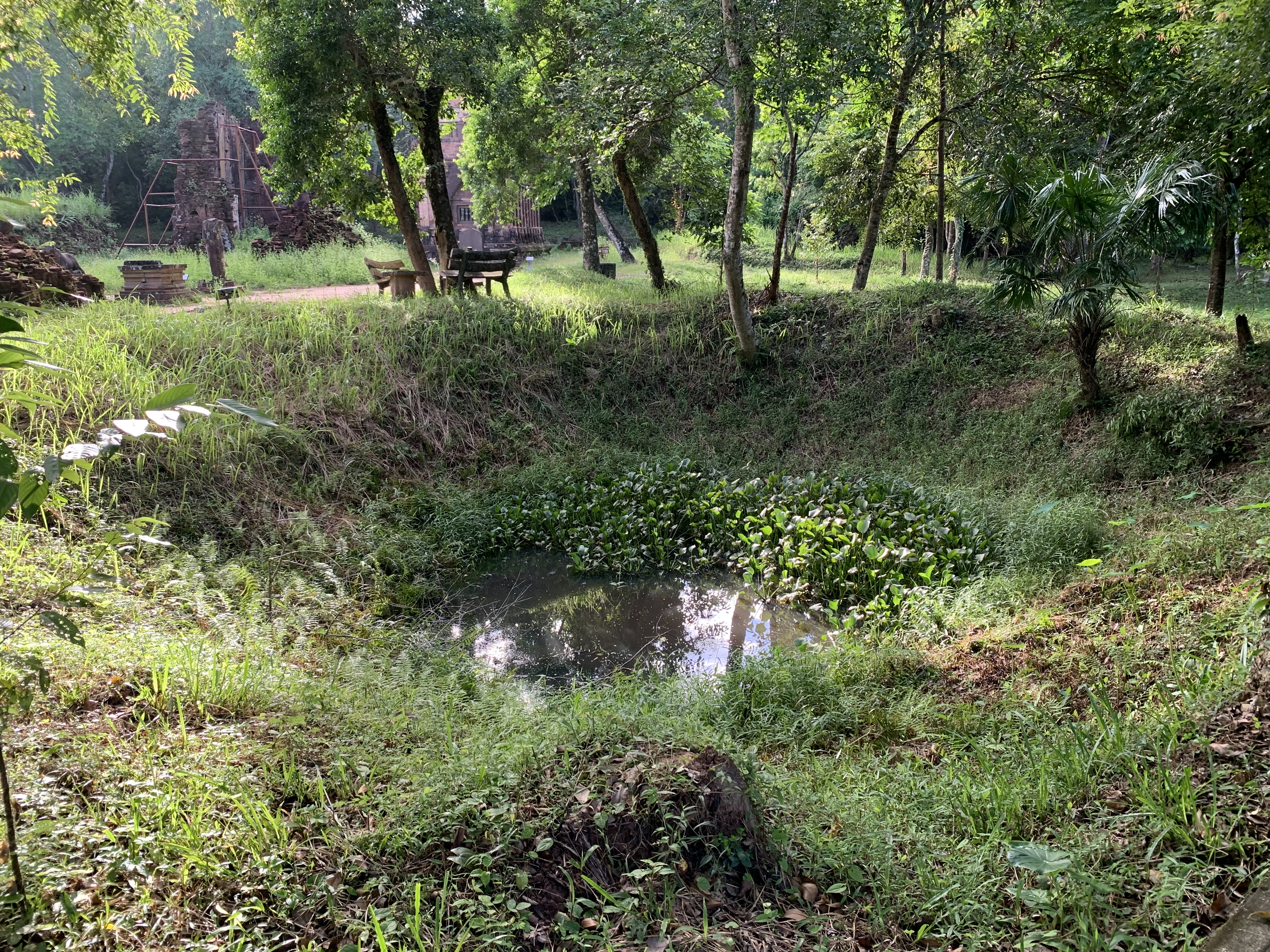
A bomb crater near structures E6 and E7

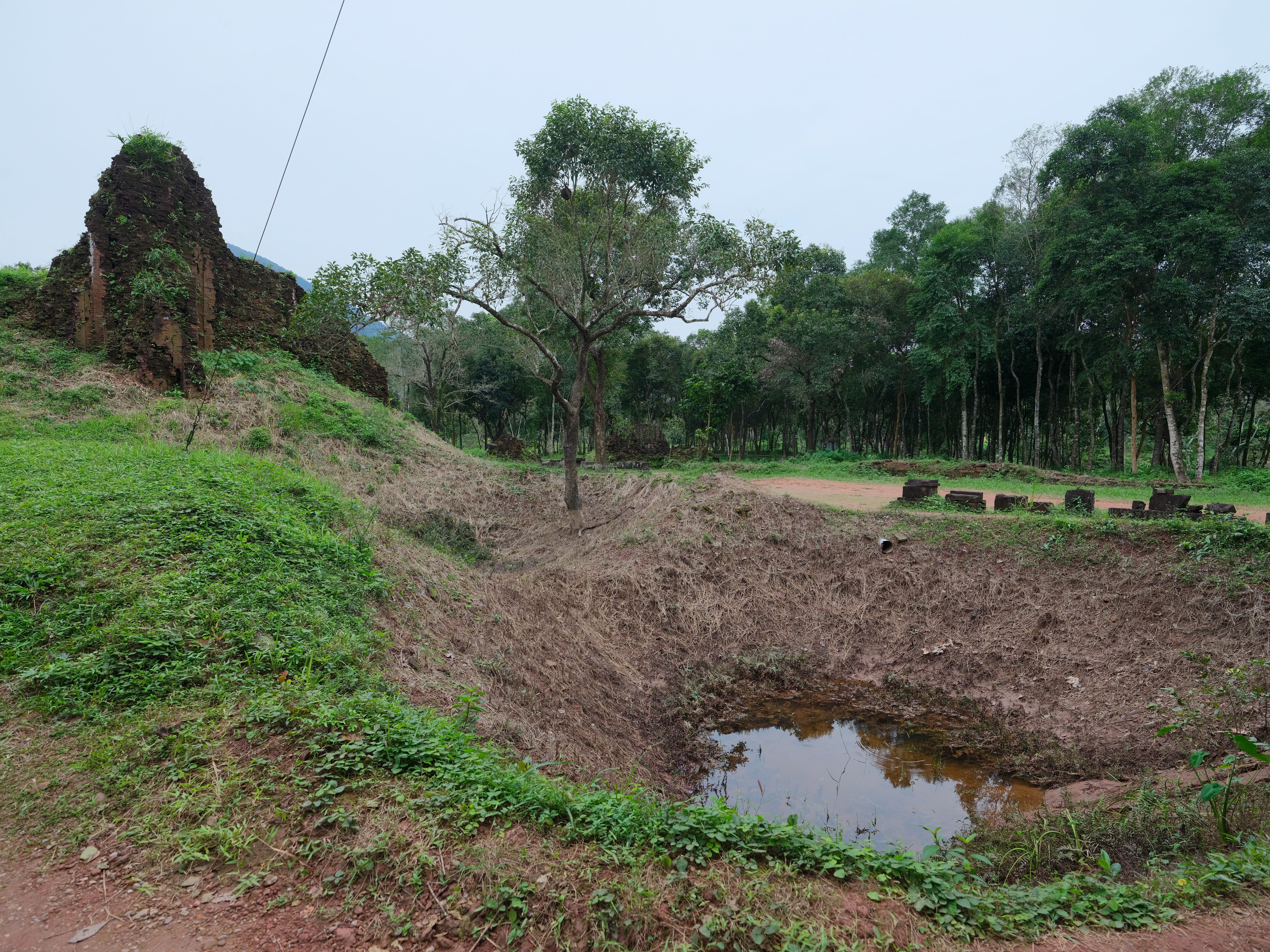
A bomb crater near structure E4

Evidences of US bombings of the site in the present day

In 1937, French scholars began to restore the temples at Mỹ Sơn. In 1937 and 1938, the main temple known as "A1" and the smaller temples surrounding it were restored. Other major temples were restored between 1939 and 1943. However, many historical buildings were destroyed during the Vietnam War. The temples were part of a People's Army of Vietnam and Viet Cong base area when United States aircraft bombed the region in August 1969. The surrounding area is still rendered dangerous through the presence of unexploded land mines.

Some of the temple sites in the centre of the complex have survived to this day. However, worries persist regarding the structural soundness of the remaining temples, some of which are vulnerable to collapse. Although many statues have been removed to France or to historical museums in Vietnam, such as the Museum of Cham Sculpture in Da Nang, others can be viewed in an in-situ museum that has been set up with the funding of benefactors from Germany and Poland. In 1981, the restoration works were carried out by a team of Polish conservators from Lublin, headed by Kazimierz Kwiatkowski Kazik.

From 2002 to 2004, the Ministry of Culture of Vietnam allotted around US$440,000 to maintain the site. A draft plan of UNESCO was funded by the Government of Italy and sponsors from Japan to prevent further degradation. These efforts are also funded by the World Monuments Fund.

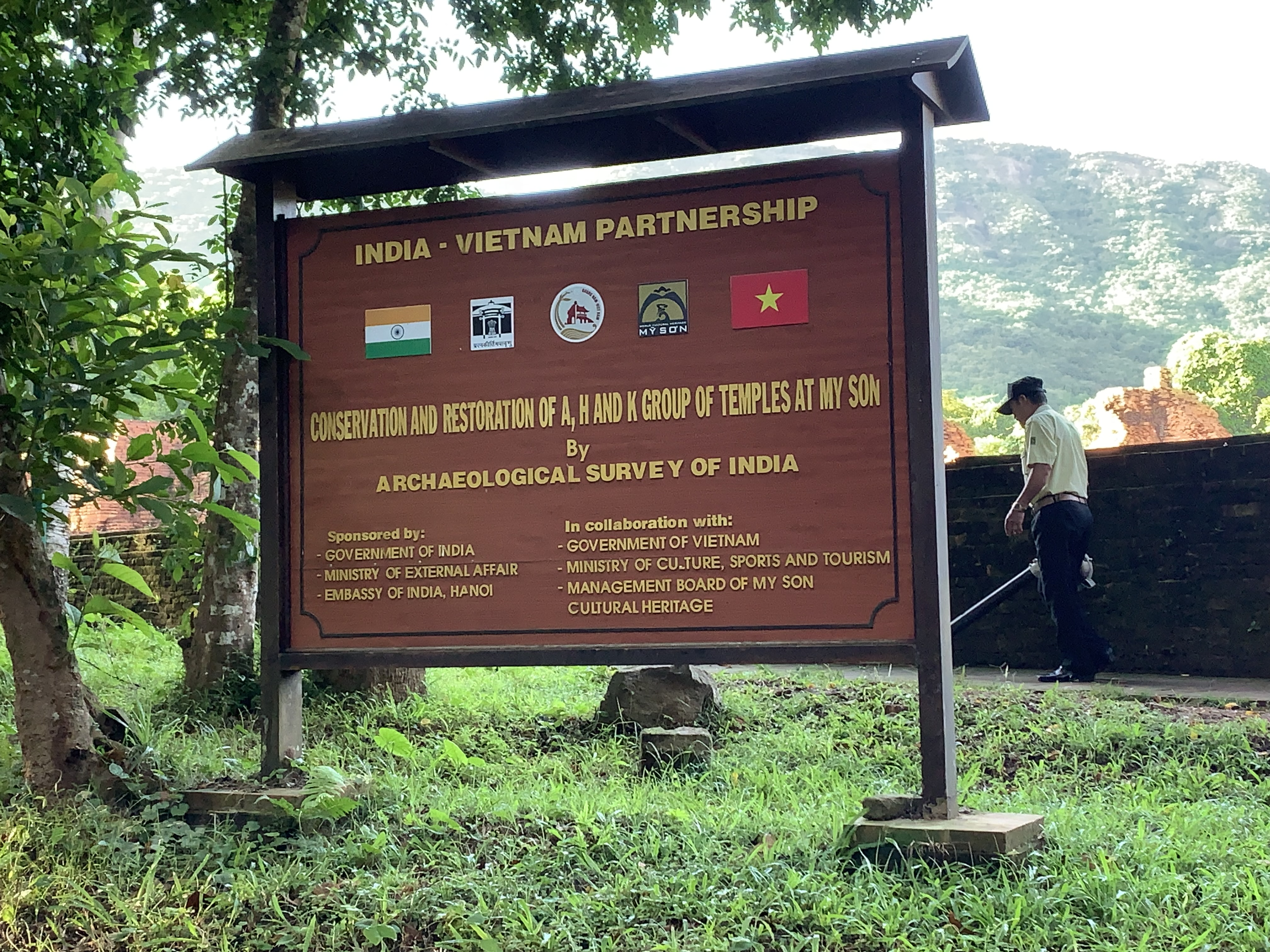
A board in the complex noting the Archaeological Survey of India in renovation of the site

India has supported conservation and restoration of the UNESCO world heritage site of ‘My Son’ in Quang Nam Province of Central Vietnam, which represents historical links between the two countries. Towards the conservation of Cham monuments at My Son, a request was received from Vietnam and as a follow up to this, the ASI Technical Team prepared a Preliminary Observation Report as mandated by the Ministry of External Affairs. Subsequently a Memorandum of Understanding was signed between the Government of India and Government of Vietnam on 28 October 2014. Thereafter, a Technical Team of the ASI conducted survey and prepared detailed estimates and documentation work.

India has extended assistance through the Archaeological Survey of India (ASI) in conservation of three blocks of Cham temples in Central Vietnam’s UNESCO World Heritage Site at My Son in Quang Nam Province, which have been restored by ASI during 2017-22 at an outlay of US$2.25 million. The completion of conservation and restoration of A, H and K group of temples by ASI was marked on 20 December 2022 at the My Son complex site in Quang Nam province.

== Archeology and architecture ==
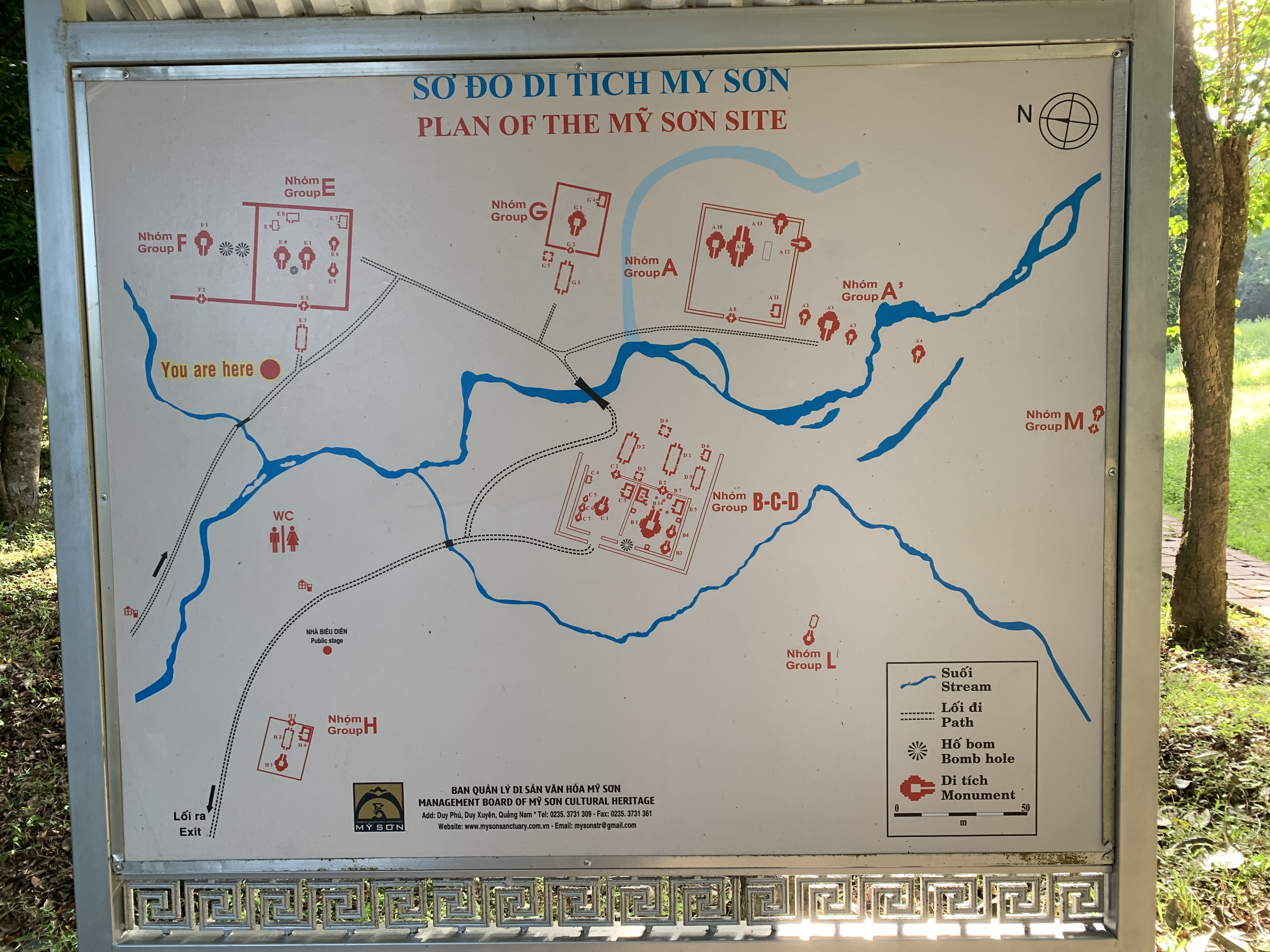
Map of My Son Sanctuary displaying groups, paths, streams, and bomb craters

=== Types of buildings ===
All of the remaining buildings at Mỹ Sơn are believed to be religious buildings. They are of the following types:

- A kalan is a brick sanctuary, typically in the form of a tower, used to house a deity.
- A mandapa is an entry hallway contiguous with a sanctuary.
- A kosagrha or "fire-house" is a construction, typically with a saddle-shaped roof, used to house the valuables belonging to the deity or to cook for the deity.
- A gopura is a gate-tower leading into a walled temple complex.

=== System for the identification of buildings ===
When he began his studies of Mỹ Sơn in 1899, Henri Parmentier found the remnants of 71 temples. He classified them into 14 groups, including 10 principal groups each consisting of multiple temples. For purposes of identification, he assigned a letter to each of these principal groups: A, A', B, C, D, E, F, G, H, K. Within each group, he assigned numbers to the edifices comprising it. Thus "My Son E1" refers to the edifice at My Son belonging to group "E" that has been assigned the number "1."

=== Architectural styles ===
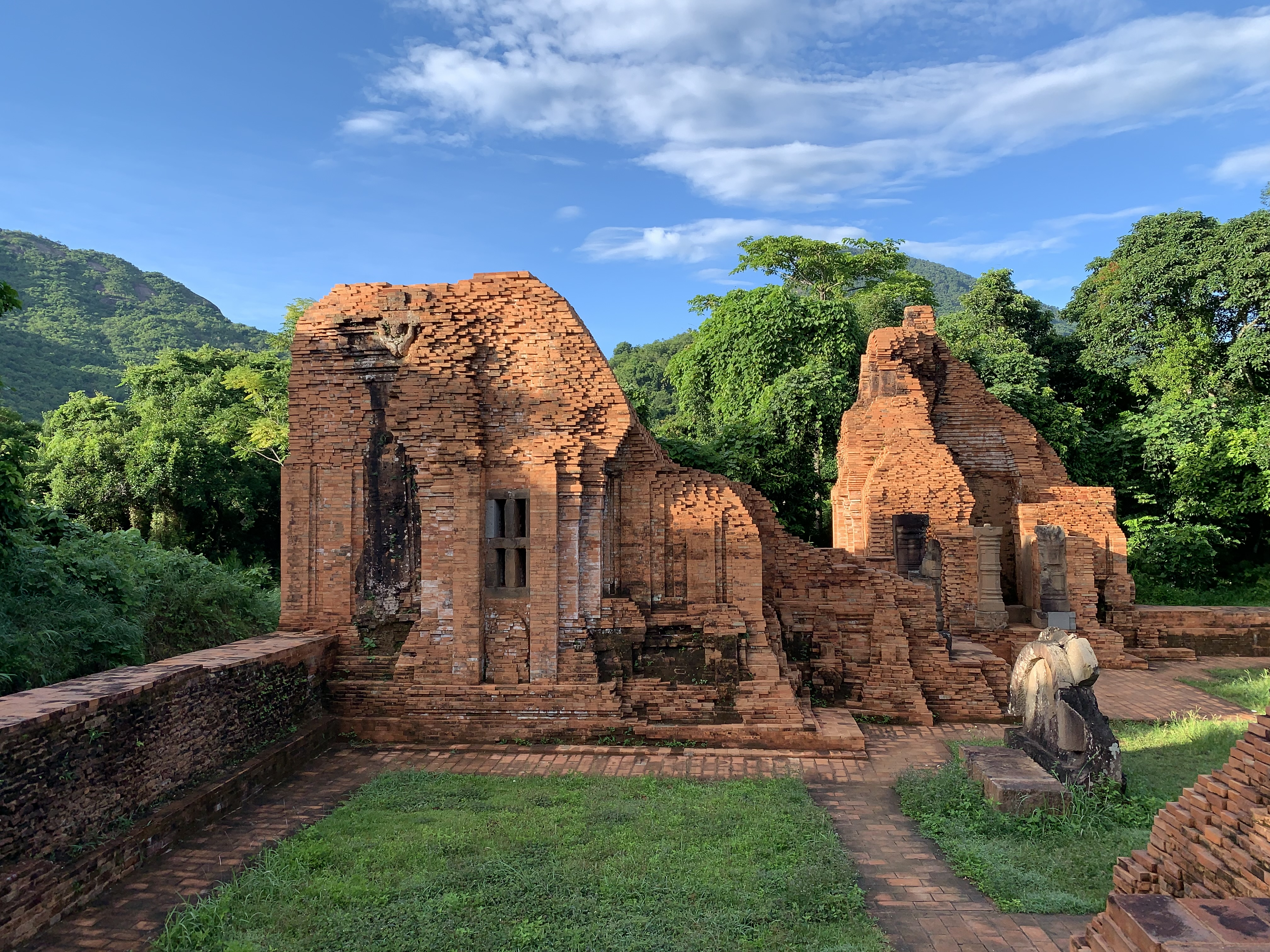
Structures A12 and A13, representing Đồng Dương style

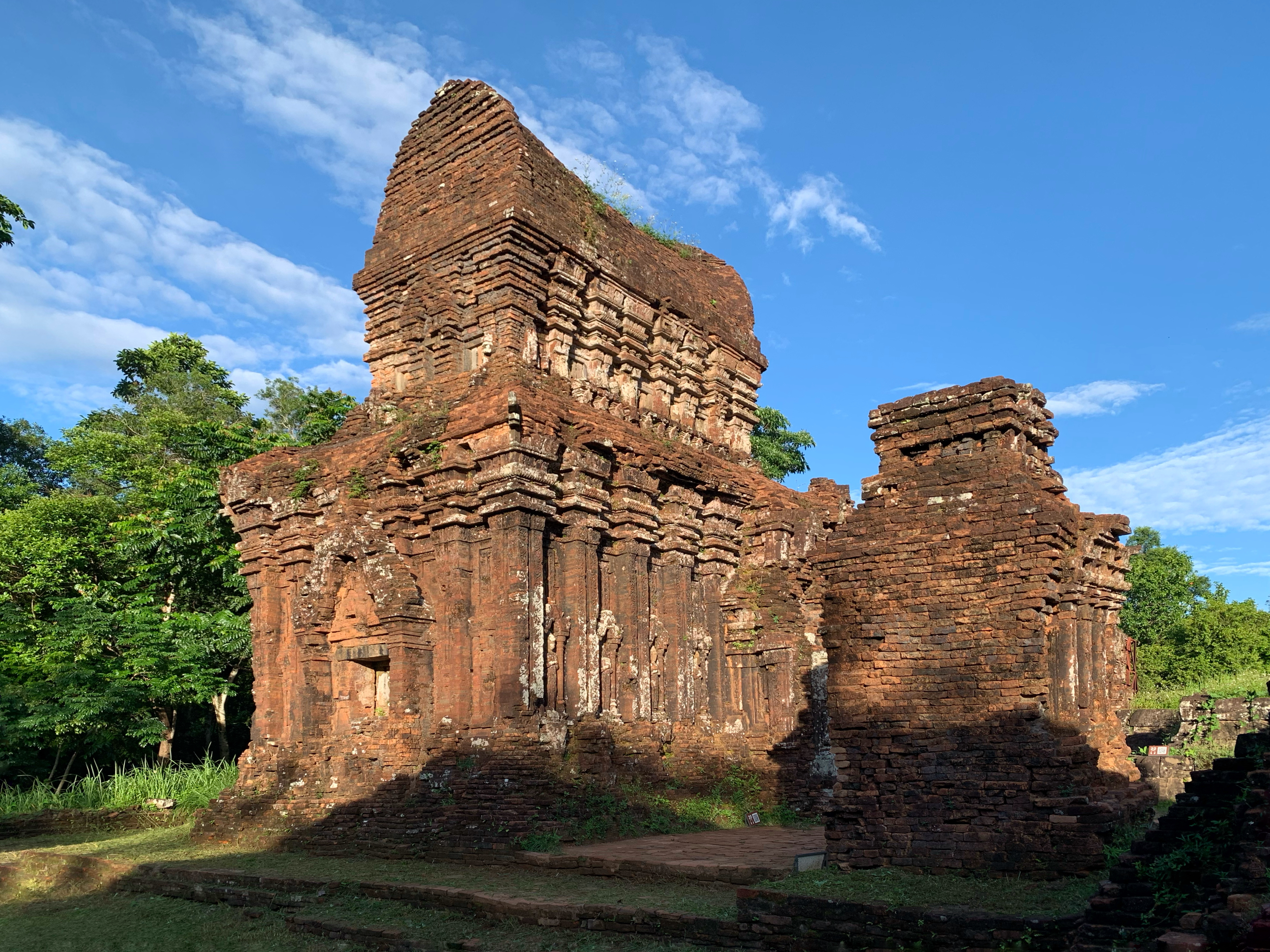
Structure B5 or "the storehouse" is the outstanding surviving exemplar of the Mỹ Sơn A1 style.

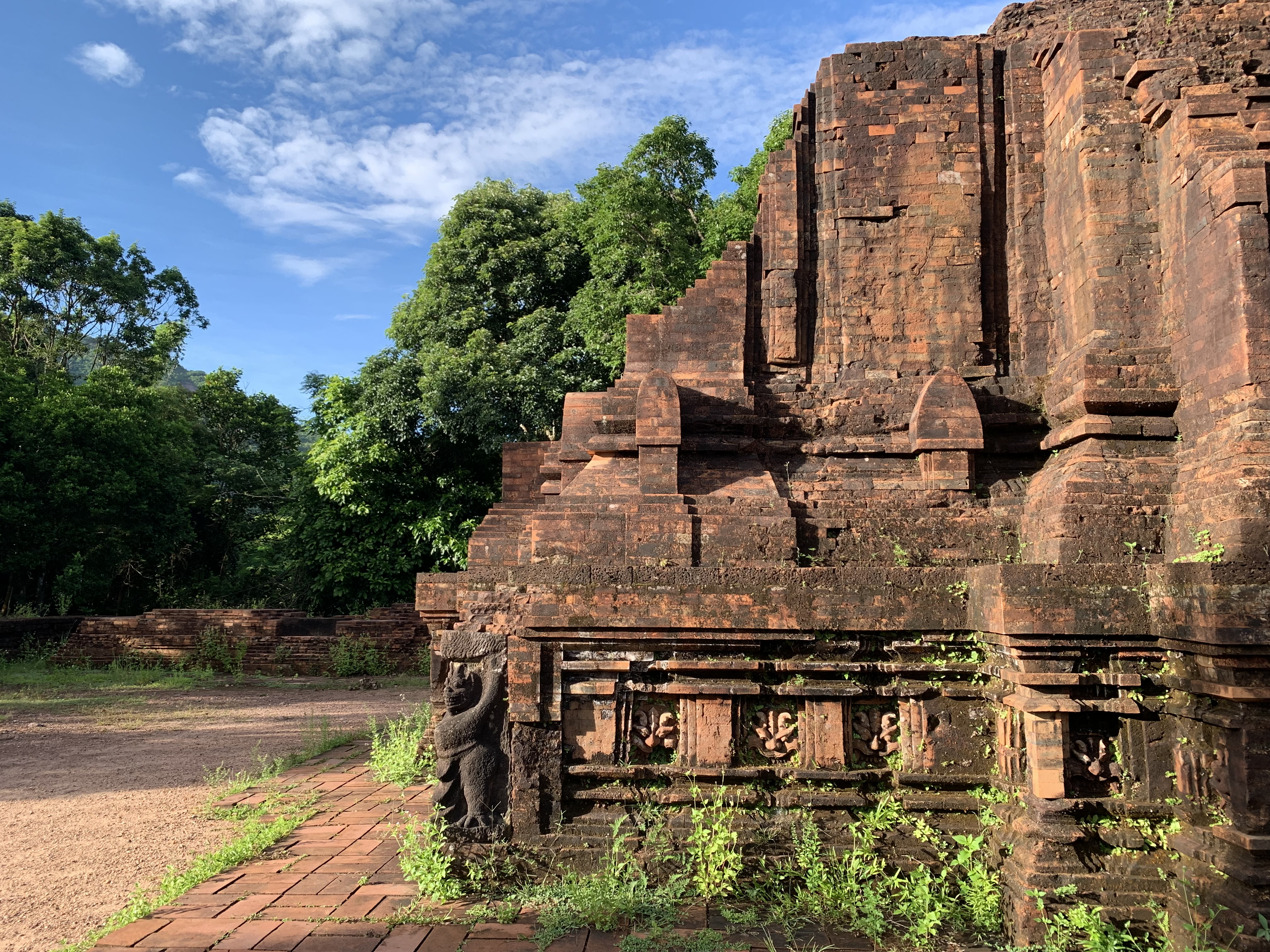
Pedestal of structure G1, representing Bình Định style

Art historians have classified the architectural and artistic legacy of Champa into seven artistic styles or phases of development. Six of the styles are represented at Mỹ Sơn, and two are believed to have originated from there. They are known as the Mỹ Sơn E1 Style and the Mỹ Sơn A1 Style. In particular the temple known as "A1" is often referred to as the architectural masterpiece of the Cham. The six styles of Cham architecture represented at Mỹ Sơn are the following:

- The style of Mỹ Sơn E1 and F1 dates to the 8th century AD. The temple known as "E1" is now ruined. The style which it established is represented today by two works of art that formerly belonged to the temple but today are housed in the Museum of Cham Sculpture in Da Nang: a pedestal and a tympanum.
- The style exemplified by My Son A2, C7 and F3 is similar to the style of Hòa Lai from the turn of the 9th century.
- The Đồng Dương style of the late 9th century is reflected in Mỹ Sơn A10, A11-13, B4, and B12. This style is named after the Vietnamese town that occupies the site of the 9th century city and Buddhist monastery of Indrapura. The archeological site of the monastery has been largely destroyed; French scholars of the early 20th century were able to create diagrams of its layout and the disposition of its buildings. Numerous striking works of sculpture belonging to this style survive in Vietnamese museums.
- The Mỹ Sơn A1 style of the 10th century is exemplified by Mỹ Sơn B5, B6, B7, B9, C1, C2, C5, D1, D2, and D4. It is the most heavily represented style at My Son, and is known for its elegance and grace. The style's namesake and most important architectural exemplar, the once magnificent tower known as "A1," is largely ruined. It is a mound of earth, surrounded by rubble and the outline of a wall, at the center of which stands a whitish pedestal. A scale model of the former temple created by Japanese researchers as well as a schematic frontal view are exhibited in the Museum of Cham Sculpture. The most striking of the remaining buildings belonging to the style may be the storehouse B5, which exemplifies the saddle-shaped roof peculiar to Cham artchitecture. The My Son A1 style is sometimes also known as the Tra Kieu Style, after the nearby town of Trà Kiệu which may be the site of the historical Cham city of Simhapura. Many architectural ornaments from this style survive and are displayed in the Museum of Cham Sculpture.
- A transitional style of the early 11th century to the middle of the 12th century is exhibited in Mỹ Sơn E4, F2, and the K group of sites.
- The style of Bình Định that prevailed in Cham architecture from the end of the 11th century, when the center of the Cham polity was displaced southward from the area around My Son to Vijaya in Bình Định Province, to the start of the 13th is represented by Mỹ Sơn B1 and groups G and H.

=== Building techniques ===
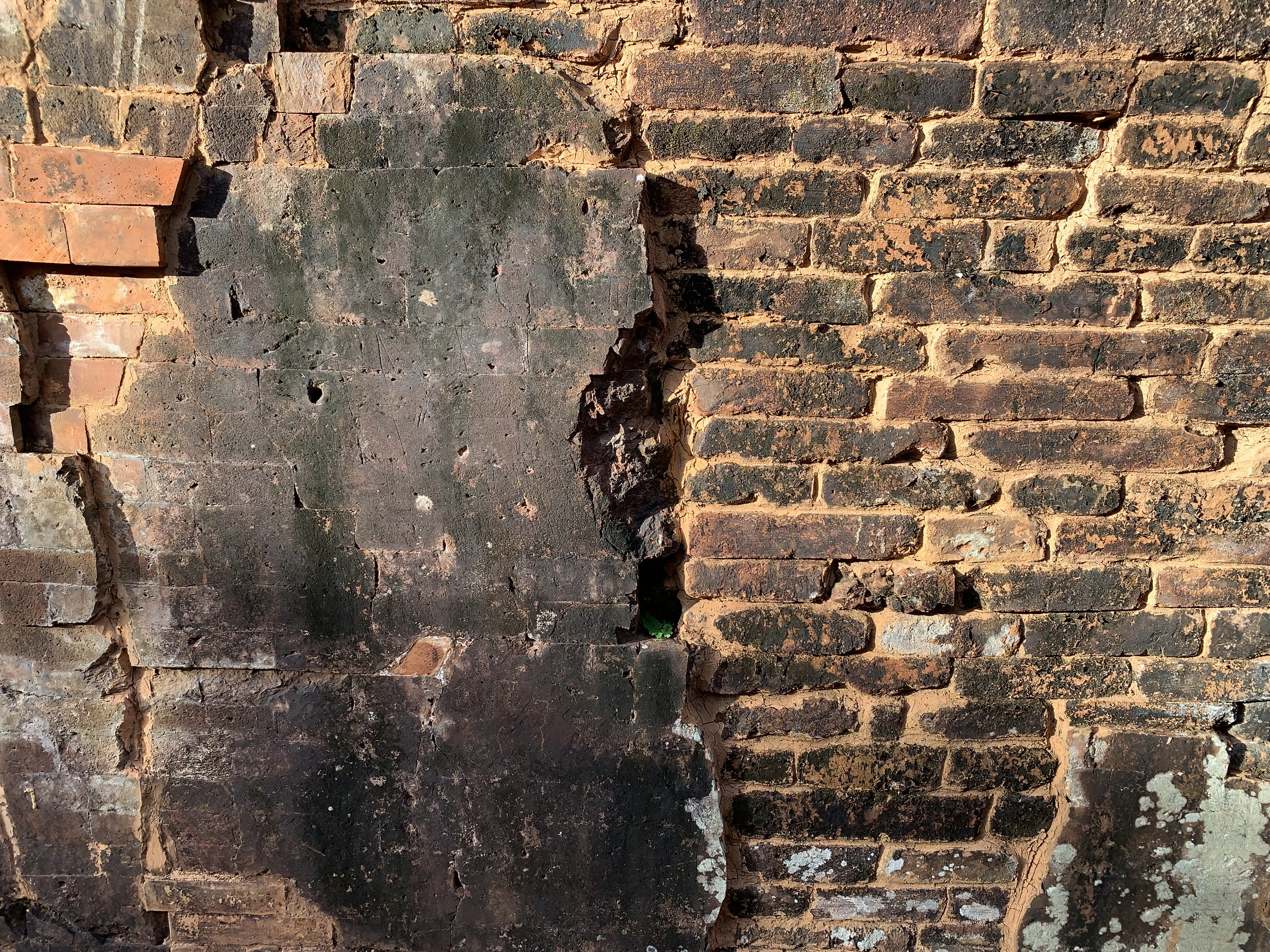
Original brick construction (left) in comparison to the newer renovation works (right), from a structure in group A

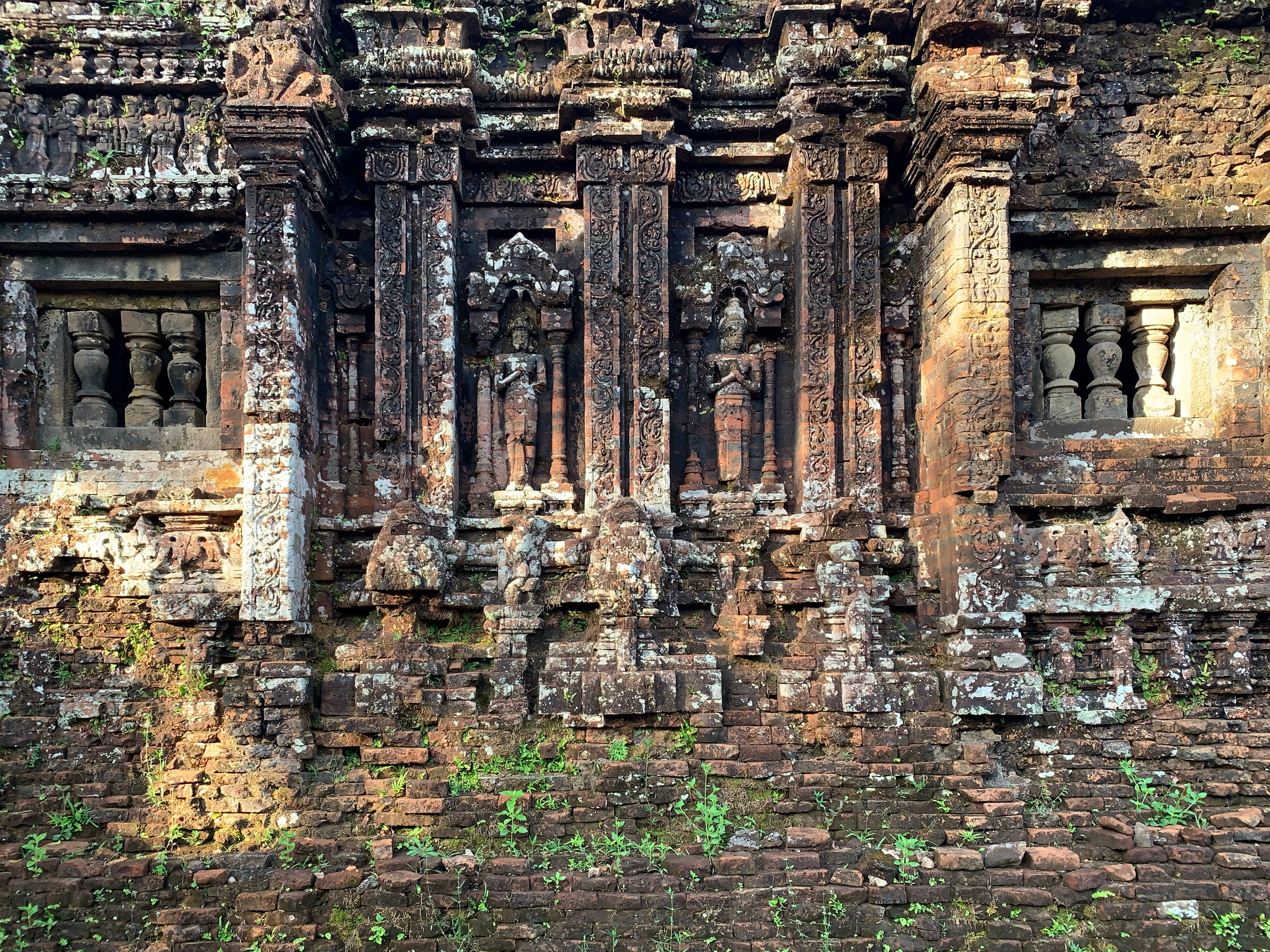
Decorative carvings have been cut directly into the bricks. Pictured here of structure D1

Most of the temples at Mỹ Sơn were made of red brick, and only one (the temple labelled "B1") was made of stone. Even the decorative carvings on the Cham temples were cut directly onto the bricks themselves, rather than onto sandstone slabs inserted into brick walls as is observable for example in the 9th century Cambodian temple of Bakong.

To this day, the construction techniques used by the Cham builders are not completely understood. Issues that have not been completely resolved include issues about the firing of the bricks, the mortar between the bricks, and decorative carvings found on the bricks.

- At what point in the building process were the bricks hardened by fire? Were the bricks hardened first, and then arranged in order to build the structures, or were the structures built out of partially hardened bricks, after which the entire structures were heated by fire to finish the hardening of the bricks? The hypothesis that the entire structures were reheated following assembly is supported by evidence that the mortar between the bricks was at some point subjected to high temperatures. The contrary hypothesis is supported by the observation that the structures bear no signs of scarring from large intense fires such as would be needed in order to reheat them as whole.
- How were the bricks stuck together? One hypothesis is that the builders at Mỹ Sơn developed a way to glue bricks together using tree resin native to central Vietnam. Another hypothesis is that the builders used a sticky mortar made from the same clay as the bricks themselves. The latter hypothesis is supported by chemical tests that have found no trace of any organic substance between the bricks, but instead have found mineral substances similar to those present in the core of the bricks. Today the mortar that once held the bricks together has largely decayed, and even a strong wind can knock loose bricks from the structures.
- At what point in the process were the decorative carvings made? Were the walls constructed and then carved, or were the bricks carved first and then assembled so as to create the walls? An examination of the carvings reveals no broken lines as would be expected if the bricks were carved first and then assembled; and as a result scholars have concluded that the Cham craftsmen made their carvings directly onto finished brick walls.

=== Inscriptions ===
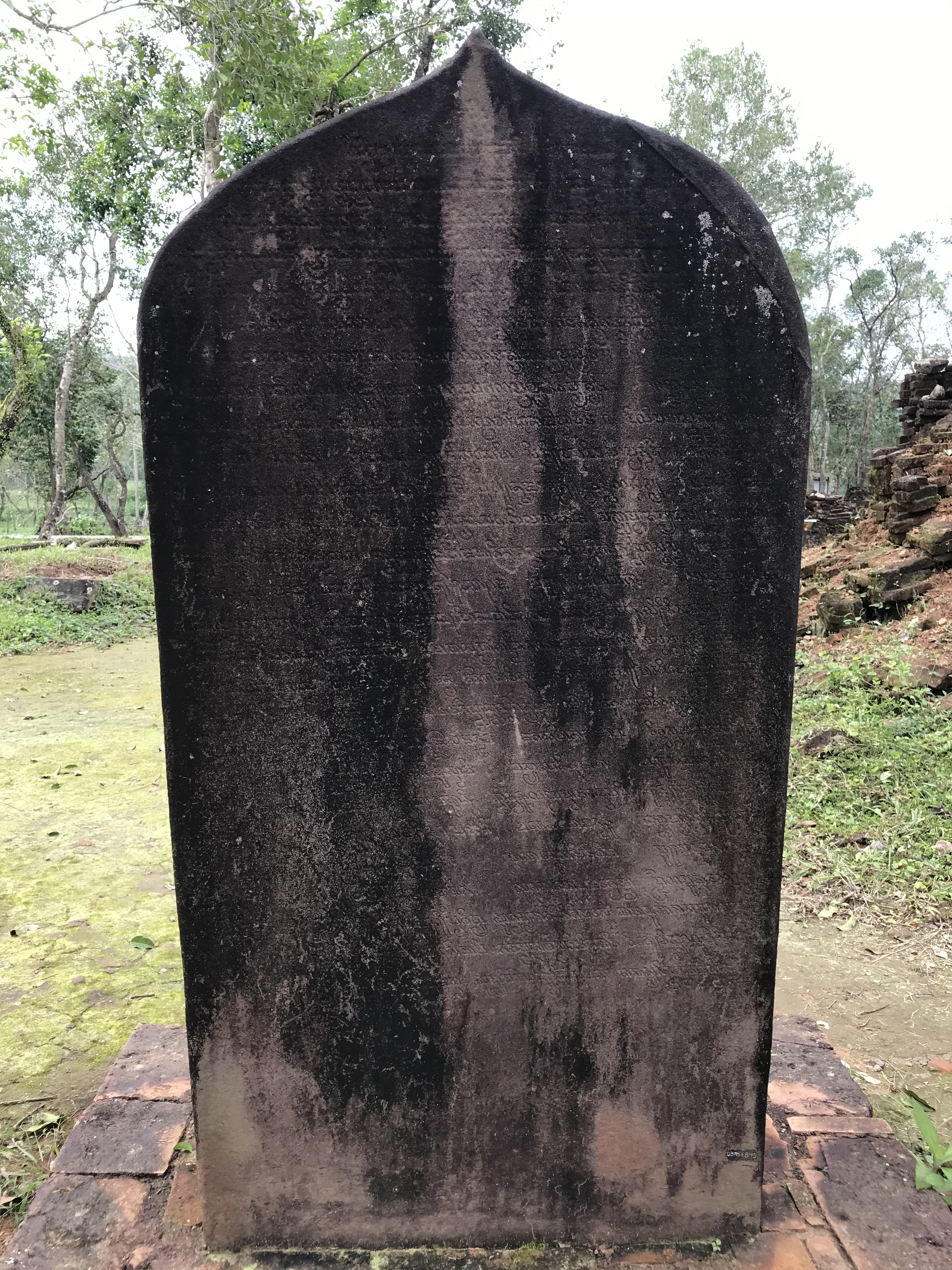
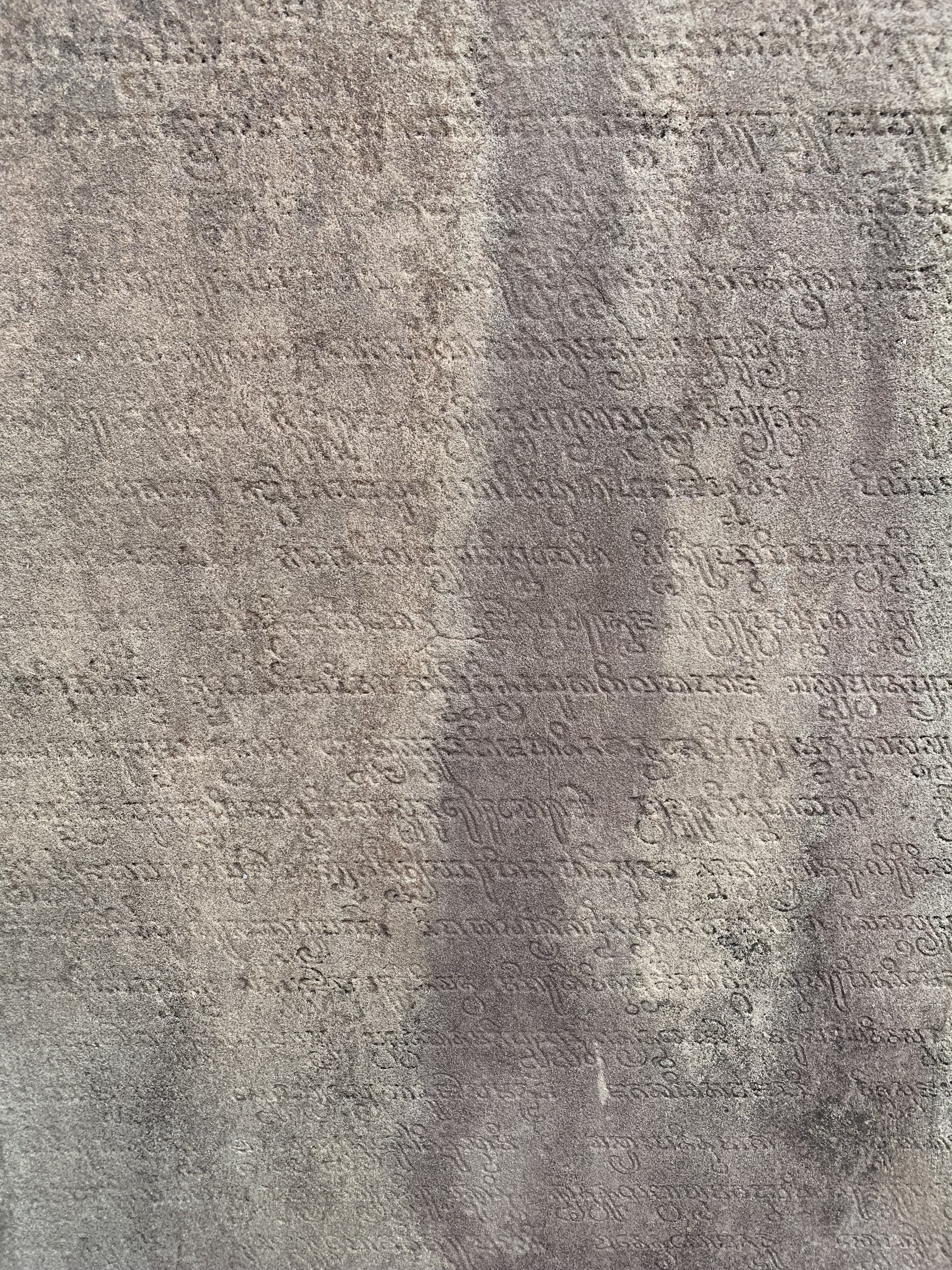
A stele in situ at group E, erected by King Prakāśadharman-Vikrantavarman in 657 AD

The people of Champa maintained written records in both Sanskrit and old Cham. They wrote on perishable materials, such as large leaves, and also created inscriptions in stone. They used scripts borrowed from India. None of the writings on perishable materials have survived. However, numerous stone inscriptions have been preserved, transcribed, and translated into modern languages.

Many of Champa's most important inscriptions are on steles, that is to say on slabs or pillars of stone erected precisely for the purpose of hosting inscriptions. Scholars have found approximately 32 steles at Mỹ Sơn, dated between the 5th and the 12th century AD.

The subject-matter of Cham inscriptions is mostly political and religious. They are written from the perspective of kings or very high potentates seeking to affirm their legitimacy and their relationship to the divine. Many of the inscriptions document a gift to a god, such as a gift of land, of people, or of treasure, or a foundation dedicated to a god, such as the foundation of a temple, an altar, or a pedestal. The inscriptions also provide us with important information such as the name of the country (typically Campadesa in the Sanskrit inscriptions, nagara Campa in the Cham inscriptions), and the names of some of its most important cities: Simhapura ("Lion City"), Virapura ("Knight City"), Rajapura ("King City"), Vijaya ("Victory"). Finally, a number of the inscriptions allude to or describe interesting historical events, such as the ongoing wars between Champa and Cambodia in the 12th century.

== See also ==
- Champa
- Art of Champa
- Architecture of Vietnam
- Austronesian peoples#Architecture
