= Harivarman II =

King of Champa

- Raja-di-raja

King of Champa
- Reign: 988–997
- Coronation: 988
- Predecessor: Lưu Kế Tông
- Successor: Yang Pu Ku Vijaya Sri
- Born: Unknown; Indrapura, Champa
- Died: 997; Indrapura
Names
- Śrī Harivarmadeva

Harivarman II (Chinese: 楊陀排; pinyin: Yángtuópái), was king of Champa from 988 to 997.

Between 983 and 988, the throne of the leading power of mandala Champa, the Principality of Indrapura, had been interrupted by Lưu Kế Tông (r. 986–989), a Vietnamese usurper who took advantage of unrest in Champa after Champa–Dai Viet War of 982. Lưu Kế Tông was a tyrant king and under his rule many people fled the country to Hainan Island and Guangzhou, as the Chinese dynastic records say. In 988, the Cham nobility elected a prince that supposedly would become king. As Lưu Kế Tông died in the next year, the prince was crowned as Harivarman II in Indrapura (Fóshì).

Harivarman sent a diplomatic delegation commissioned by Lǐ Zhēn (Ali Zain?) and Pú Hēsǎn (Abu Hassan?) to the court of the Song dynasty in December 990, informing them about Champa's new ruler along with tribute gifts.

In 991, Harivarman rebuilt the temple of Īśānabhadreśvara at My Son, which previously might have been vandalized by the usurper. In 992 he obtained the release of 360 Cham war prisoners from Song China who were sold to slavery by the Viet after the 982 war. Maspero said that in 995 and 997 king Le Hoan of the Dai Viet complained with the Song court about Cham raids in his territories of Hoan and Ai (Thanh Hoa and Nghe An) while he was attacking Champa in 990 and 997. During that period from late 10th-early 11th century AD, most of the textual evidence in Champa was either destroyed and damaged due to constant wars and chronic depressions, resulting in lack of inscriptions, several major gaps of chronology (965–991, 991–1008, 1013–1050) and making Cham history of this period simply faded in obscurity.

Harivarman II died in 997 and was succeeded by a dubious ruler, only known as Yang Pu Ku Vijaya Çri.

== Bibliography ==
- Coedès, George (1975), Vella, Walter F. (ed.), The Indianized States of Southeast Asia, University of Hawaii Press, ISBN 978-0-824-80368-1
- Golzio, Karl-Heinz (2004), Inscriptions of Campā based on the editions and translations of Abel Bergaigne, Étienne Aymonier, Louis Finot, Édouard Huber and other French scholars and of the work of R. C. Majumdar. Newly presented, with minor corrections of texts and translations, together with calculations of given dates, Shaker Verlag
- Griffiths, Arlo; Lepoutre, Amandine; Southworth, William A.; Phần, Thành (2009). "Études du corpus des inscriptions du Campa III, Épigraphie du Campa 2009–2010. Prospection sur le terrain, production d'estampages, supplément à l'inventaire" (PDF). Bulletin de l'École française d'Extrême-Orient. 95–96: 435–497. doi:10.3406/befeo.2008.6118.
- Lafont, Pierre-Bernard (2007), Le Campā: Géographie, population, histoire, Indes savantes, ISBN 978-2-84654-162-6

| Preceded by Lưu Kế Tông 986–989 | King of Champa; 988–997 | Succeeded by Yang Pu Ku Vijaya Sri 997–? |
