= Indrapura (Champa) =

Capital of the ancient kingdom of Champa

- Đồng Dương इन्द्रपुरम्
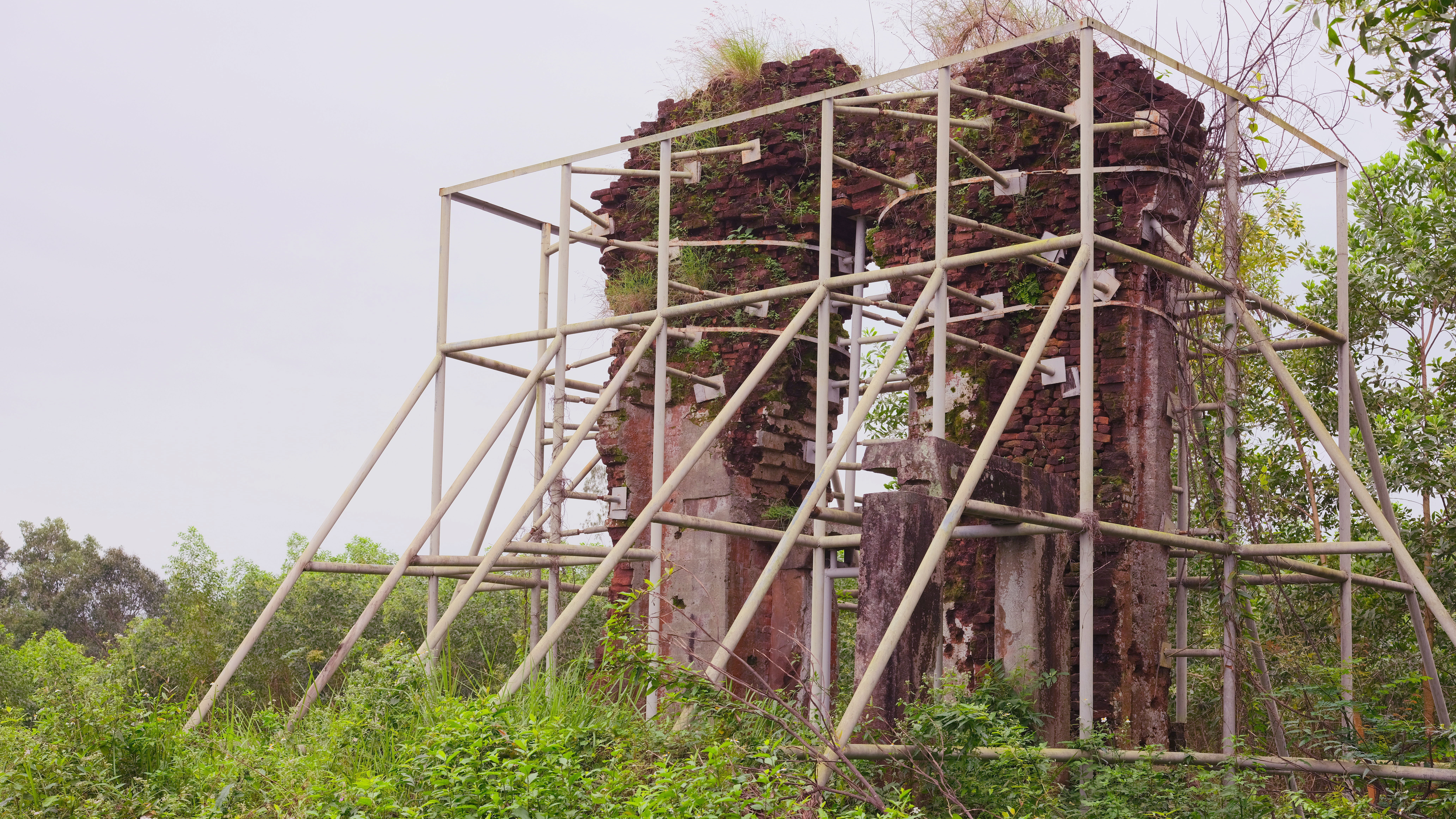
- The ruins of Đồng Dương Monastery

- Location within Vietnam
- 15°40′01″N 108°22′59″E
- Type: Former capital of Champa
- Location: Thăng Bình, Quảng Nam province, Central Vietnam

History
- Founded: 875
- Founder: Indravarman II
- Demolished: 1471, 1969

Indrapura or Đồng Dương was the capital city of the kingdom of Champa from 875 AD until 982, or until 12th century AD. It was built and ruled under the reign of Buddhist king Indravarman II (r. 875–890) and some of his successors belonging to the Bhrgu dynasty in Đồng Dương. The word Indrapura means "City of Indra" in Sanskrit, Indra being the Hindu God of Storm and War, and King of the Gods in the Rig Veda.

== Nomenclature ==
The name "Indrapura" (the modern toponym is "Đồng Dương") was translated in Chinese and Vietnamese sources as Fóshì/Phật Thệ (Chinese: 佛逝) or Fóshìchéng (Chinese: 佛逝城, lit. 'the City of Indra' or 'the city of Buddha'). Previous generations of scholars had posited that "Fóshì" was a transcription of Vijaya (Chinese: 尸唎皮奈; pinyin: Shīlì Pínài; Vietnamese: Thị Lợi Bi Nai; alternate: Chà Bàn).

== History ==
=== Influence of Mahayana Buddhism ===
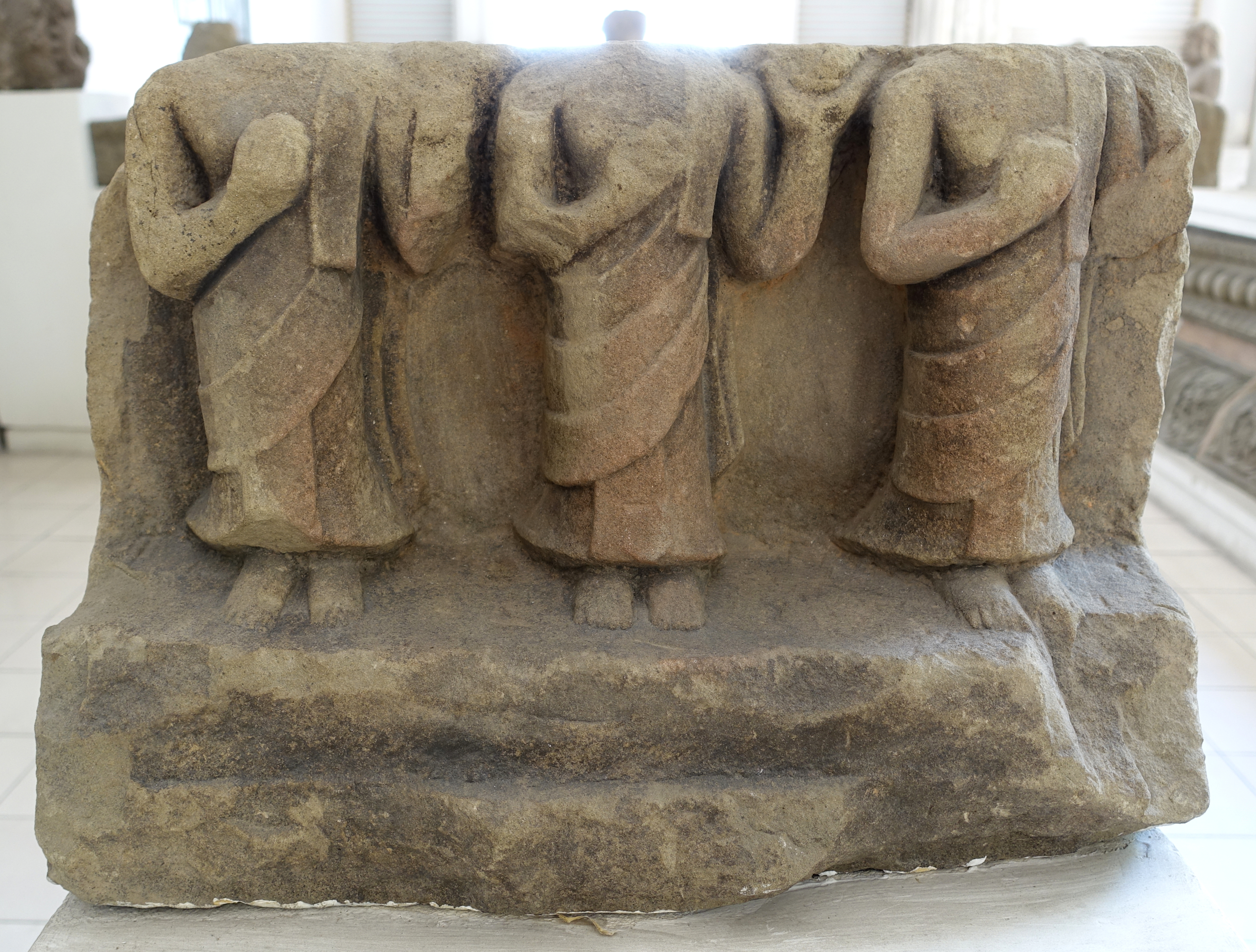
Sculpture of Cham monks, c. 10th century, Dong Duong style. Museum of Cham Sculpture, Danang.

The city was built around 875 CE by Indravarman II, a Cham Buddhist king who also was the founder the Bhrgu dynasty of Champa. Under the Bhrgu dynasty, Indrapura was made the prime capital of Champa for around a century. Indravarman II took the construction of a Mahayana Buddhist temple complex named Lasmindra Lokesvara at Indrapura. The dynasty also left many spatial Buddhist temples around Indrapura. A high-ranking Cham court official was known for Buddhist pilgrimage travel from Indrapura to Java Island around 911–912.

Buddhist temples extended as far north as Quảng Bình and across northern Champa. This led the 13th century Vietnamese emperor Trần Nhân Tông, a Buddhist devotee, to travel to Champa for nine months during which he visited Buddhist sacred sites.

=== End and destruction ===
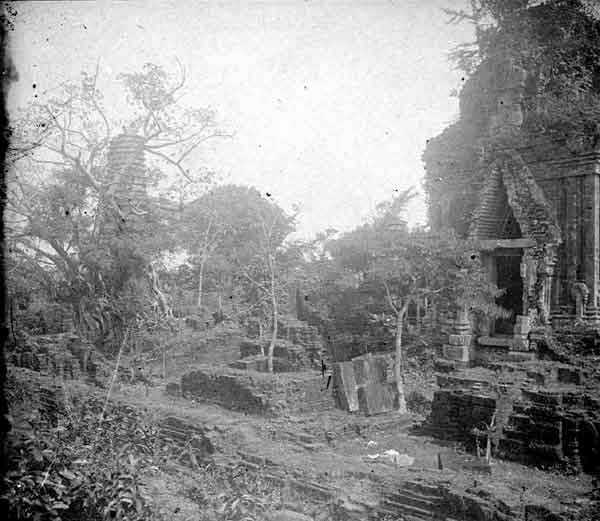
Đồng Dương and its stupa. Photo taken in 1902.

The rise of two neighboring powers, Đại Cồ Việt in the north and the Khmer Empire in the West, posed new threats to Champa. A war between Champa and the Khmer Empire in 945, and another with Đại Cồ Việt under the Early Lê dynasty in 979, together weakened Champa. In 982, emperor of the Đại Cồ Việt, Lê Hoàn, led armies to sack a city in Northern Champa (Quảng Bình) in the Cham–Vietnamese War (982), killing the Cham king Paramesvaravarman I. His successor retreated 700 li (300 km/186 mi) to the city of Indrapura.

In 983, a Vietnamese named Lưu Kế Tông (Liu Jizong) dethroned the ruling king of Champa, and in 986 he proclaimed himself king of Champa, while sending envoy to Song China to find recognition, and his story was recorded in the History of the Song dynasty (Song Shi) and Song Huiyao Jigao. Many Chams fled to China's Hainan Island. In 988, the new king of Champa, Harivarman II, who was referred to in Chinese sources (in the Song Shi and SHYJG) as Yángtuópái (楊陀排), sent an envoy to the Song dynasty. The Song Shi reports that a Cham envoy in 1007 reported that "my country was formerly subject to Jiaozhou, then we fled to Foshi [Indrapura], 700 li south of our former location." The Vietnamese chronicle Khâm định Việt sử Thông giám cương mục relates that Huế was once in Cham territory, or had been belonged to the Principality of Foshi [Indrapura].

There was no proof that yāï po ku vijaya śrī Harivarman (r. 989–997), who was elected by the Cham to overthrow Lưu Kế Tông, had ever moved the capital south to Bình Ðịnh. These historical accounts could be seen as evidence that a Vietnamese attack in 982 not on Indrapura, but on a city ruled by a minor king from the same Indrapura dynasty in modern-day Quảng Bình. Early scholarship misinterpretation had failed to recognize the fact that 'Foshi' in both Chinese and Vietnamese sources was indeed Indrapura, not Vijaya. Michael Vickery suggests it was likely an ostensibly endeavor of colonial-era scholars to link Chinese eponym Foshi with Southeast Asian Vijaya to solder the existence of the posited Srivijaya empire (rediscovered in 1911) which located in modern-day Indonesia.

The possession of Champa power was then transferred to the hand to Vijaya in Binh Dinh by the 12th century.

Dong Duong and My Son were struck by USAF carpet bombs in August 1969, leaving both historic sites in ruins of bricks.

== Archaeology ==
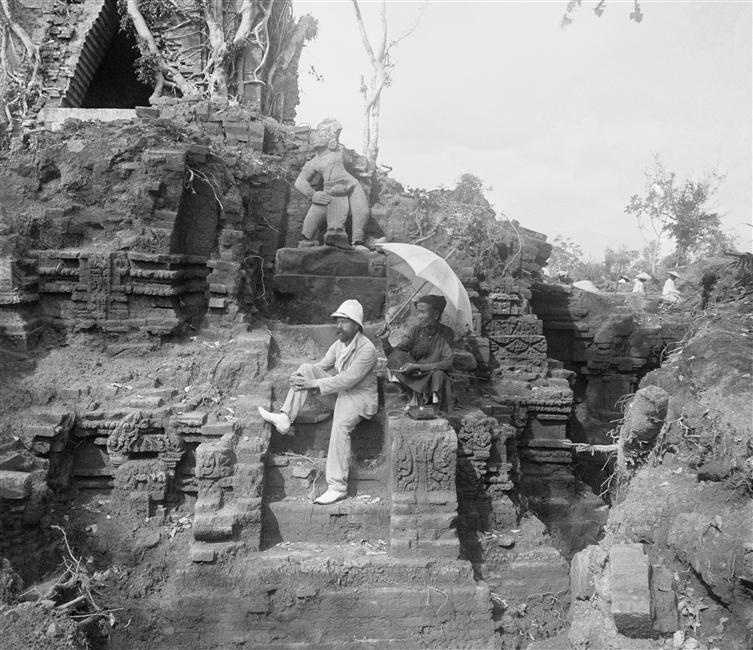
Đồng Dương before its destruction during the Vietnam War

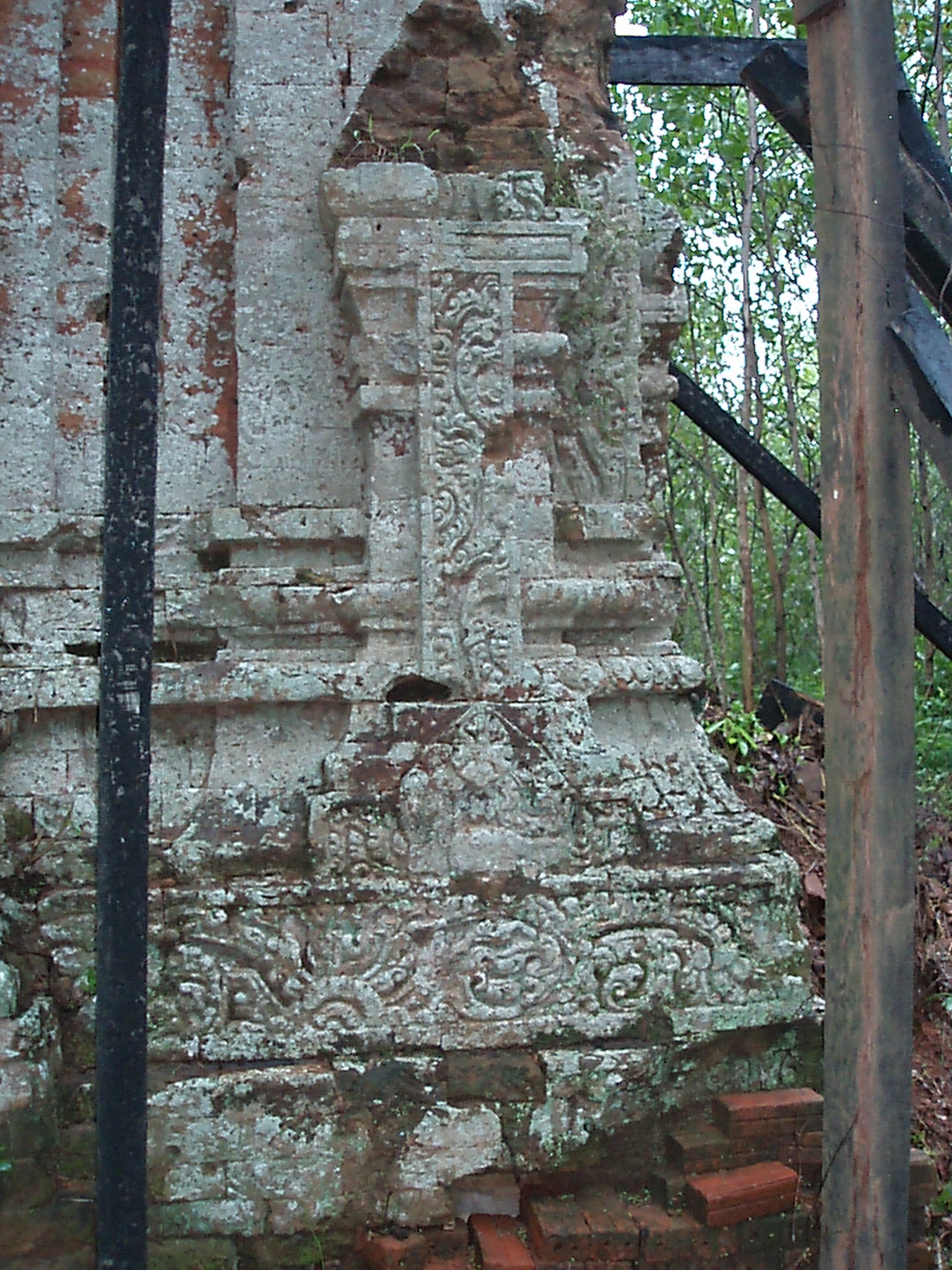
Crumbling ruins of the Monastery in 2011

Đồng Dương and surrounding sites during the height of the war were hotspots of the NLF (Vietcong) activities and bunkers. After the war as Champa sites throughout South Vietnam had received massive destructions, research on Champa resumed in the late 1980s and 1990s. In recent decades, Indrapura/Đồng Dương has been re-excavated, revealing new insights about the city during its magnificence.

Modern-day vestiges of Indrapura/Đồng Dương are barely recognizable: eroded citadel; the royal palace area; watch towers; ruins of the Monastery; paved roads, bridges, and sewer system. It was a highly organized, well-urbanized city. Except for the remaining temples and shrines, most buildings in medieval Indrapura might have been constructed with wooden materials such as logs or bamboo.

== See also ==
- Tra Kieu
- Vijaya
