= Champa =

Coastal states in present-day Vietnam, c. 192–1832

Kingdom of Champa Campapura, Campanagara, Nagaracampa, Nagarcam
- 192–1832 AD
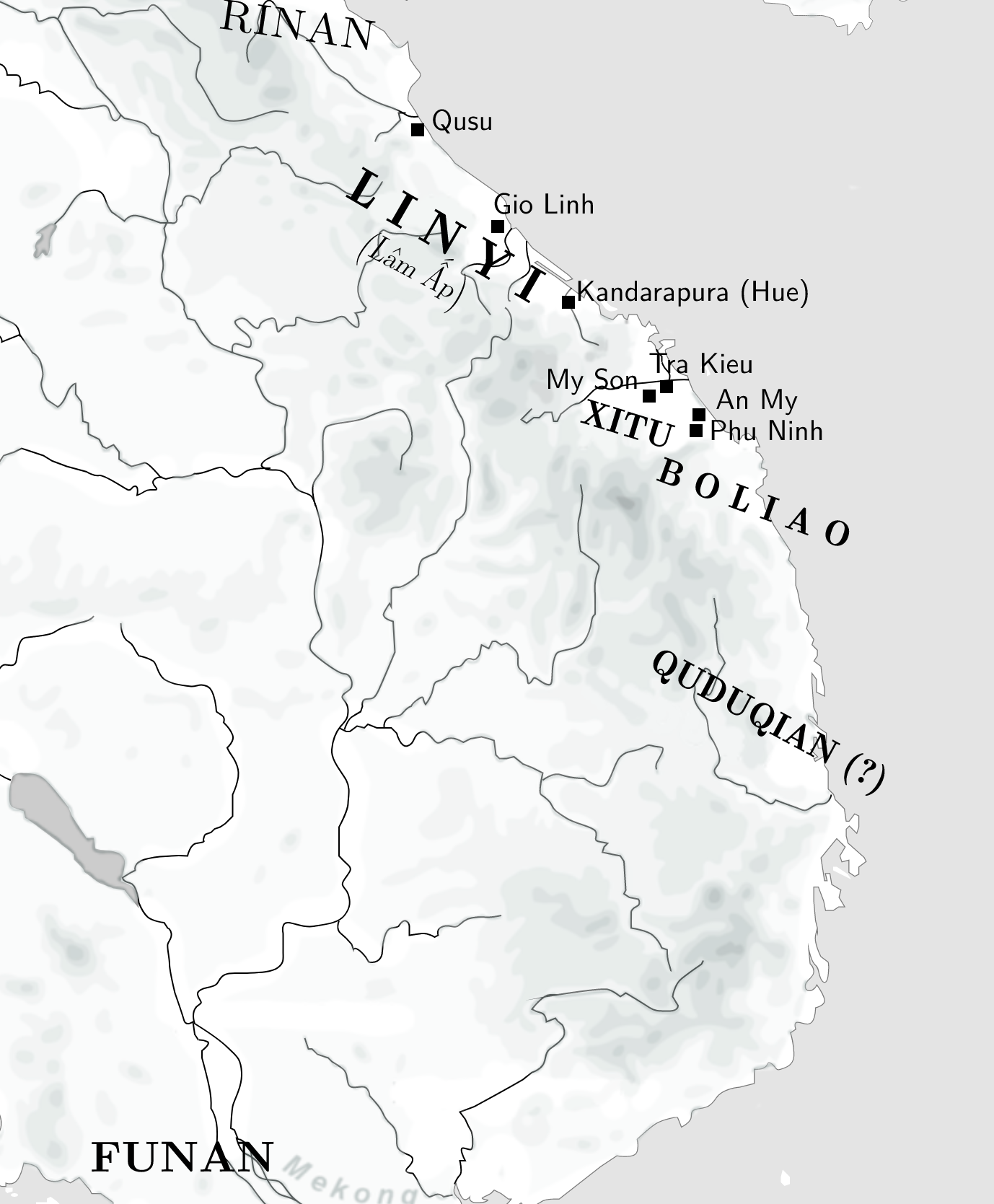
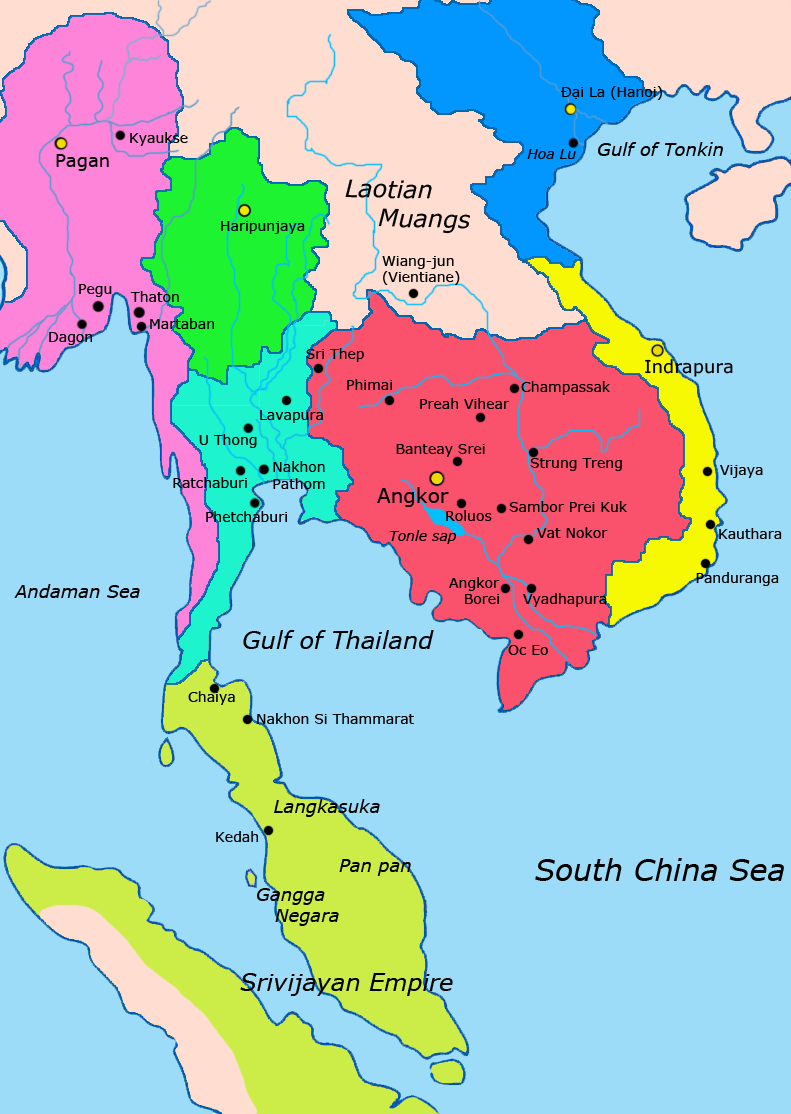
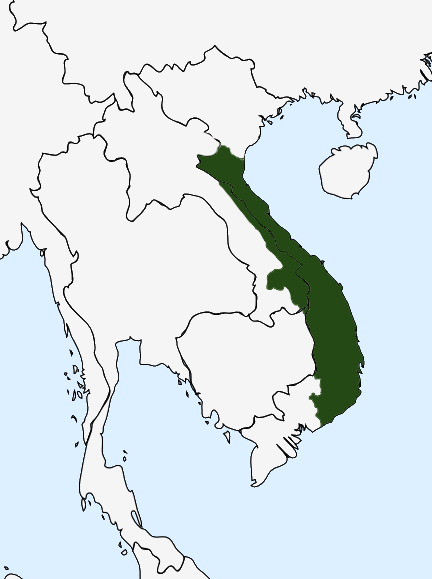
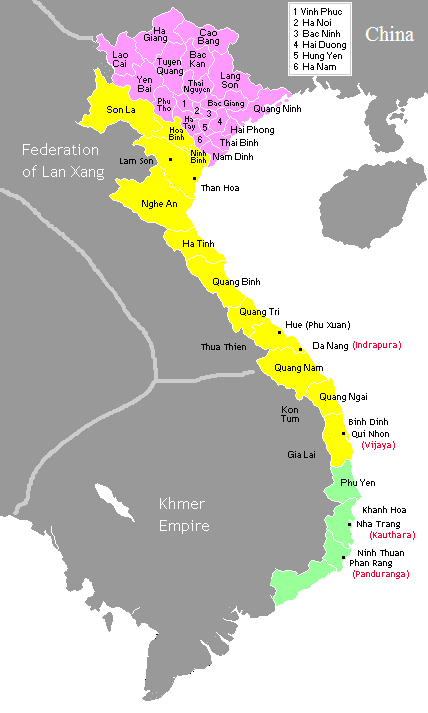

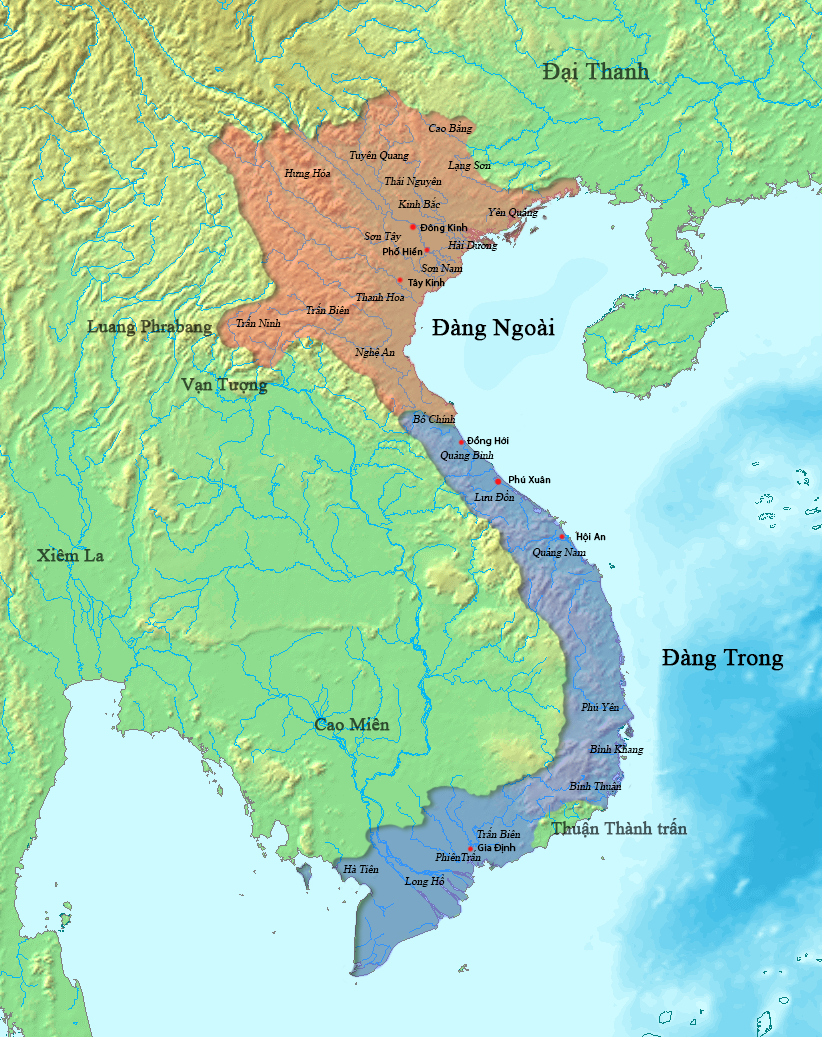
- Principality of Thuận Thành (1757), Cham Panduranga reorganized as vassal state of Đại Việt in 1697 until abolished by Vietnamese in 1832.
- Capital: Kandapurpura (192–605); Simhapura (605–757); Virapura (757–875); Indrapura (875–982); Vijaya (982–1471); Panduranga polity (1471–1832)
- Common languages: Old Cham (c. 100s–1450); Old Malay (lingua franca; c. 400–1600); Middle and Modern Cham (official; 1450–1832); Chamic languages other languages of Southeast Asia
- Religion: Before 5th century: Chamic indigenous religions From 5th century: Hinduism–Buddhism (Syncretism); From 16th century: Islam
- Government: Monarchy (city-state)
- King of Champa
- History
  - Established: 192
  - Vietnamese conquest of Champa: 1471
  - Panduranga annexed by Vietnam under Nguyễn dynasty: November 1832

Population
  - peak (AD 800): 2,500,000
Preceded by	Succeeded by
Sa Huỳnh culture; Eastern Han dynasty	Nguyễn dynasty
- Today part of: Vietnam; Laos; Cambodia

Champa (Note: Sanskrit: चम्पा, romanized: Campā Cham: Cham: ꨌꩌꨛꨩ, Jawi: چمڤا Khmer: ចាម្ប៉ា Vietnamese: 占城, 占婆, romanized: Chiêm Thành, Chiêm Bà; Modern Vietnamese: Chăm Pa) was a collection of independent Cham polities that extended across the coast of what is present-day central and southern Vietnam from approximately 2nd century AD until 1832. According to the earliest historical references found in the ancient sources, the first Cham polities were established around the 2nd to 3rd centuries AD, in the wake of Khu Liên's rebellion against the rule of the Eastern Han dynasty, and lasted until when the final remaining principality of Champa was annexed by emperor Minh Mạng of the Nguyễn dynasty as a part of the expansionist Nam tiến policy.

Early Champa evolved from the seafaring Austronesian Chamic Sa Huỳnh culture off the coast of modern-day Vietnam. It was preceded in the region by a kingdom called Lâm Ấp (Vietnamese), or Linyi (林邑, Middle Chinese (ZS): *liɪm ʔˠiɪp̚), that was in existence since 192 AD; although the historical relationship between Linyi and Champa is not clear. Scholarly consensus has shifted several times as to what degree Champa functioned as a unified polity. Originally being viewed as a unified kingdom throughout most of its history, later authors suggested that Champa was better considered to be a federation of independent states. A number of modern scholars have suggested that Champa did form a unified kingdom in some periods but was disunited in others.

Hinduism, adopted through conflicts and conquest of territory from neighboring Funan in the 4th century AD, shaped the art and culture of the Cham Kingdom for centuries, as exemplified by the many Cham Hindu statues and red brick temples that dotted the landscape in Cham lands. In Champa, historians have also found the Đông Yên Châu inscription, the oldest known native Southeast Asian literature written in a native Southeast Asian language dating to around c. 350 AD, predating first Khmer, Mon, Malay texts by centuries.

Champa reached its apogee in the 9th and 10th centuries CE. The peoples of Champa maintained a system of lucrative trade networks across the region, connecting the Indian Ocean and Eastern Asia, until the 17th century. Thereafter, it began a gradual decline under pressure from Đại Việt, the Vietnamese polity centered in the region of modern Hanoi. In 1832, the Vietnamese emperor Minh Mạng annexed the remaining Cham territories. Mỹ Sơn, a former religious center, and Hội An, one of Champa's main port cities, are now World Heritage Sites.

Although the kingdom had a multi-ethnic population, the majority consisted of Austronesian Chamic-speaking peoples; Chamic languages are a subfamily of Malayo-Polynesian closely related to the Malayic and Bali–Sasak languages that is spoken throughout maritime Southeast Asia. The people who used to inhabit the region are the present-day Chamic-speaking Cham, Rade and Jarai peoples in South and Central Vietnam and Cambodia; the Acehnese from Northern Sumatra, Indonesia, along with elements of Austroasiatic Bahnaric and Katuic-speaking peoples in Central Vietnam.

Today, many Cham people adhere to Islam, a conversion which began in the 10th century, with the ruling dynasty having fully adopted the faith by the 17th century; they are called the Bani (Ni tục, from Arabic: Bani). There are, however, the Bacam (Bacham, Chiêm tục) who still retain and preserve some syncretic Hindu rituals. The Bacam are one of the few surviving non-Indic indigenous Hindu peoples in the world, with a culture dating back thousands of years. The other being the Balinese Hindus and Tengger Hindus in Indonesia.

== Etymology ==
The kingdom was known variously as Nagaracampa, Champa (चम्पा, ꨌꩌꨛꨩ) in Sanskrit as well as in modern Cham, and Châmpa (ចាម្ប៉ា) in the Khmer inscriptions, Chiêm Thành in Vietnamese, Campa in Malay, Zhànchéng (占城) in Chinese records, and aṣ-Ṣanf (صَنْف) in Arabic.

The name Champa derived from the Sanskrit word campaka (चम्पक; pronounced [t͡ɕɐm.pɐ.kɐ]), which refers to Magnolia champaca, a species of flowering tree known for its fragrant flowers. Rolf Stein proposed that Champa might have been inspired when Austronesian sailors originating from Central Vietnam arrived in present-day Eastern India around the area of Champapuri (the capital of the then Anga Mahajanapada; presently in Bhagalpur district, Bihar), an ancient sacred city in Buddhism, for trade, then adopted the name for their people back in their homeland. While Louis Finot argued that the name Champa was brought by Indians to Central Vietnam.

Other academics however dispute the Indic origin explanation, which was conceived by Louis Finot, a colonial-era board director of the École française d'Extrême-Orient. In his 2005 Champa revised, Michael Vickery challenges Finot's idea. He argues that the Cham people always refer themselves as Čaṃ rather than Champa (-pa–abbreviation of -pēśvara, though see ईश्वर Īśvara for more; though Champa was also known as Campādēśa and Campānagara as well, though do also see the wikilinked suffixes). Most indigenous Austronesian ethnic groups in Central Vietnam such as the Rade, Jarai, Churu, Raglai peoples call the Cham by similar lexemes which likely derived from Čaṃ. Vietnamese historical accounts also have the Cham named as Chiêm. Most importantly, the official designation of Champa in Chinese historical texts was Zhànchéng – meaning "the city of the Cham"; "why not city of the Champa?", Vickery doubts.

== Historiography ==
=== Sources ===
The historiography of Champa relies upon four types of sources:

- Physical remains, including ruins as well as stone sculptures;
- Inscriptions in Cham, Sanskrit, and Arabic (Kufic) on steles and other stone surfaces;
- Chinese and Vietnamese annals, diplomatic reports, and other literature such as those provided by Jia Dan;
- Historiography of modern Cham people.

Approximately four hundred Champa inscriptions have been found. Around 250 of them were deciphered and studied throughout the last century. Many Cham inscriptions were destroyed by American bombing during the Vietnam War. Currently, the Project Corpus of the Inscriptions of Campā launched by French School of Asian Studies (EFEO) partnering with the Institute for Study of the Ancient World (ISAW) of New York University is tasked for cataloging, sustaining and preserving ancient Cham inscriptions into an online index library and publications of scholarship's epigraphical studies into English, French, and Vietnamese.

The Cham have their written records in form of paper book, known as the Sakkarai dak rai patao, was a 5227-pages collection of Cham veritable records, documenting a history range from early legendary kings of 11th–13th centuries to the deposition of Po Thak The, the last king of Panduranga in 1832, reckoning in total 39 rulers of Panduranga, the tales of spread of Islam to Champa in 1000, to Po Thak The. The annals were written in Akhar Thrah (traditional) Cham script with collection of Cham and Vietnamese seals imprinted by Vietnamese rulers. However, it had been dismissed for a long time by scholars until Po Dharma. Cham literature also have been greatly preserved in approximately more than 3,000 Cham manuscripts and printed books dating from the 16th to 20th centuries. The Southeast Asia Digital Library (SEADL) at Northern Illinois University currently contains an extensive collection of 977 digitized Cham manuscripts, totaling more than 57,800 pages of multigenre content.

=== Overarching theories ===
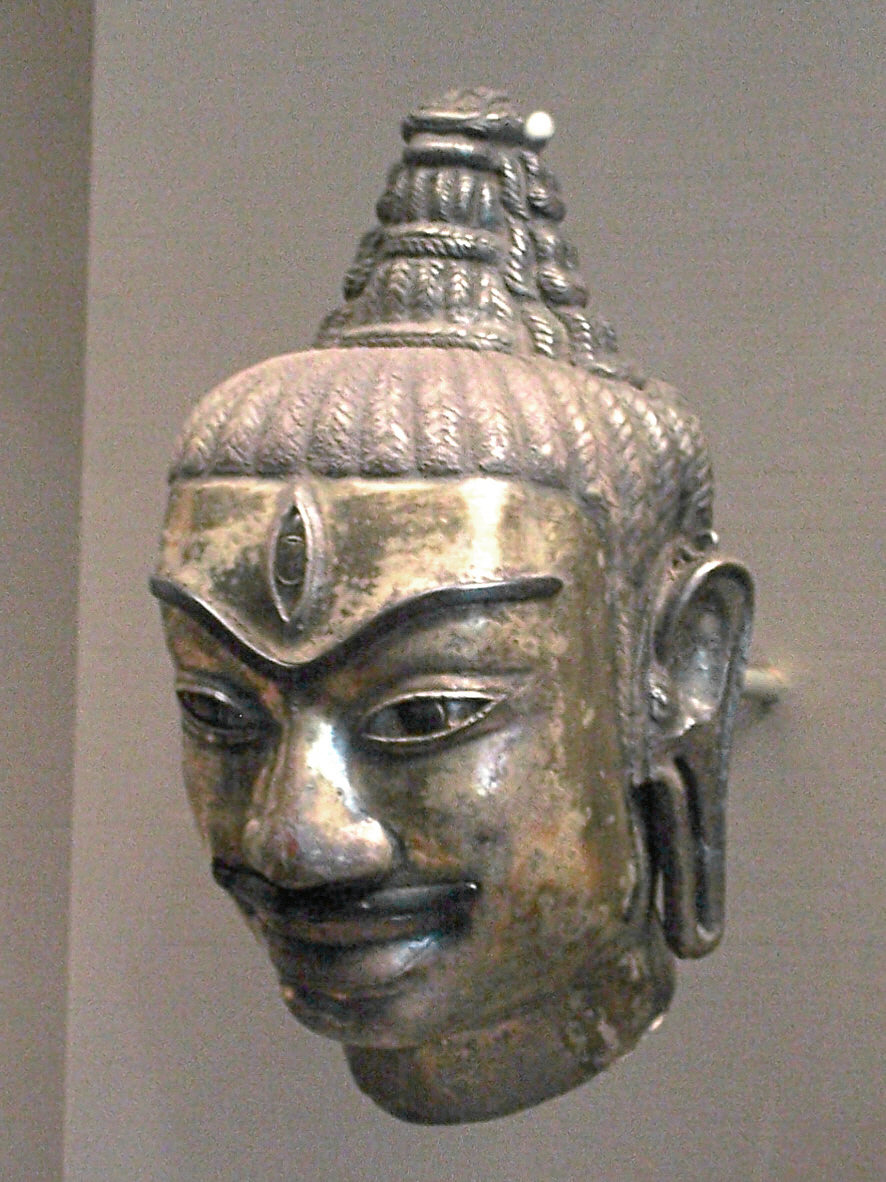
This Cham head of Shiva was made of electrum around 800. It decorated a kosa, or metal sleeve fitted to a liṅgam. One can recognise Shiva by the tall chignon hairstyle and by the third eye in the middle of his forehead.

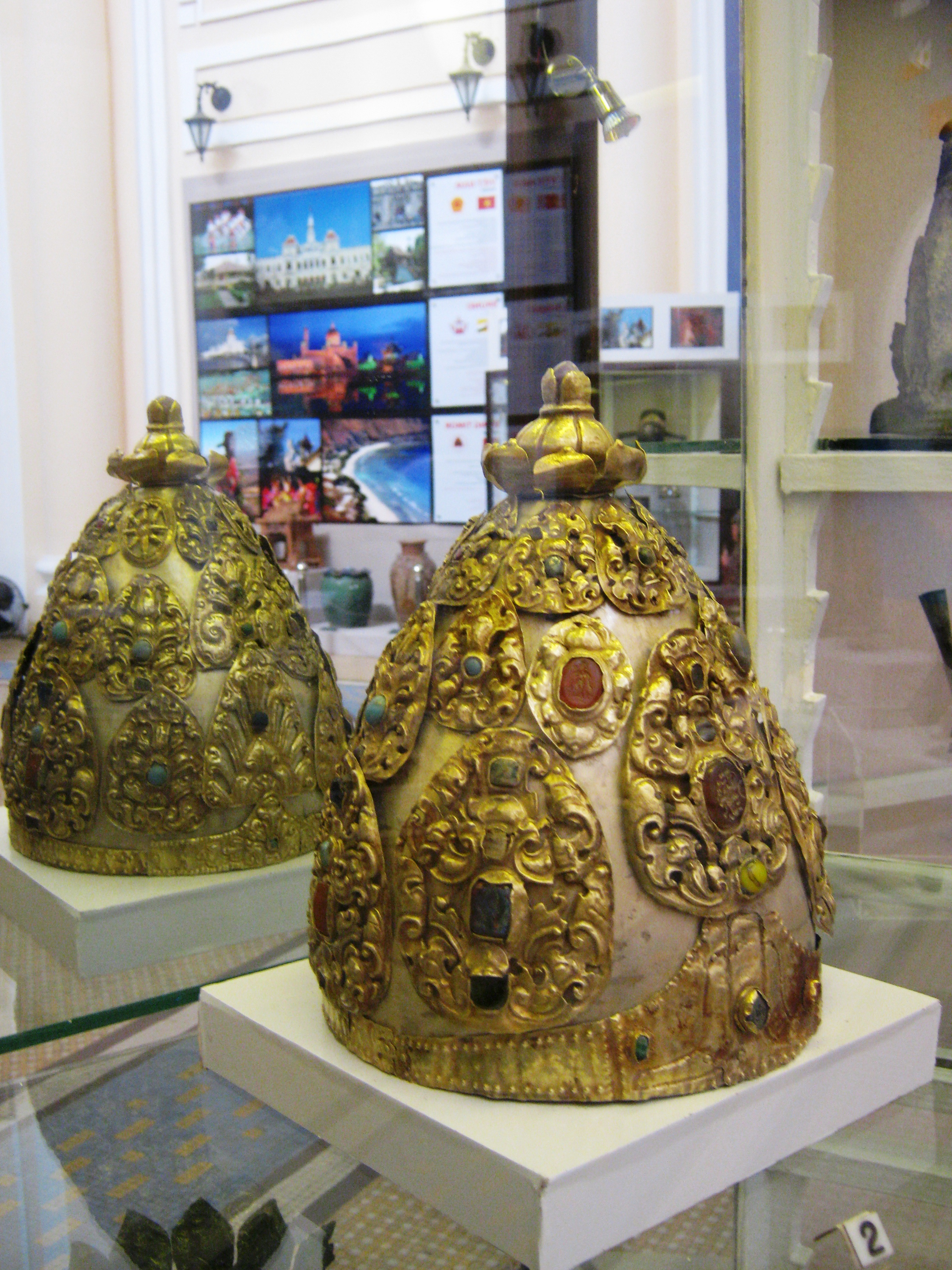
Crown of Champa in 7th and 8th century. (Museum of Vietnamese History)

Modern scholarship has been guided by two competing theories in the historiography of Champa. Scholars agree that historically Champa was divided into several regions or principalities spread out from south to north along the coast of modern Vietnam and united by a common language, culture, and heritage. It is acknowledged that the historical record is not equally rich for each of the regions in every historical period. For example, in the 10th century AD, the record is richest for Indrapura; in the 12th century, it is richest for Vijaya; following the 15th century, it is richest for Panduranga. Some scholars have taken these shifts in the historical record to reflect the movement of the Cham capital from one location to another. According to such scholars, if the 10th-century record is richest for Indrapura, it is so because at that time Indrapura was the capital of Champa. Other scholars have disputed this contention, holding that Champa was never a united country, and arguing that the presence of a particularly rich historical record for a given region in a given period is no basis for claiming that the region functioned as the capital of a united Champa during that period. (Note: Early colonial era scholars and later DRV and SRV authors treated Champa as a single, unified political body. New academic works on Cham studies begun in late 1980s revised this notion. The majority of scholarship now at least agree that Champa was a series of dynamic coexisting, overlapping polyethnic kingdoms and small principalities.(Lockhart 2011, pp. 22–24)) (Note: Previous histories of Champa such as Étienne Aymonier's 1889 Tschampa and Georges Maspero's 1910 The Kingdom of Champa had provided the ground academic understanding of Champa for almost a century. Maspero represented Champa as a single, unified kingdom, with the Cham explicitly made up nearly all of its demographics. He also presented a list of 14 presumably Cham dynasties dating back to the 2nd century.(Lockhart 2011, pp. 9–10))

== History ==
=== Sources of foreign cultural influence ===
Through the centuries, Cham culture and society were influenced by forces emanating from Cambodia, China, Java, and India amongst others. (Note: The majority of colonial era scholarship had popularized a generic orientalist assumption that Southeast Asian history has always been profoundly driven by "external forces" from the civilizations of India and China. By this narrative, Champa was glimpsed as a merely shadow, "cultural zone" of Indian civilization.(Lockhart 2011, pp. 4–5)) (Note: Some of the colonial era scholars and Indologists often favored the "Champa kingdom" when it maintained strong affirmation with Indian influence such as Hinduism, and showed less interest when "exotic oriental" Indianized features in Champa began declining by the 11th century as the Cham appeared having tendencies toward localization and Islam.(Lockhart 2011, pp. 6–7) The shrink of Indian traces in Champa (or the downfall of Cham civilization) was assumed through the eyes of some colonial-era French researchers (such as Jeanne Leuba) as the corruption of pure Hinduism and Buddhism due to syncreticizing with local traditions. Leuba also took blame on Islam for the decline of Champa.(Lockhart 2011, pp. 7–8)) (Note: Along with a global renewal of Cham studies in the late 1980s, a group of French academics favored a reevaluation/redefinition the importance of Cham and indigenous history in the making of Southeast Asia. This trend rejected earlier colonial-era scholarship's Eurocentric framework "externalist thesis" for denying and downplaying indigenous Southeast Asian civilizations, slamming them as deliberate attempts to justify colonialism.) An official successfully revolted against Chinese rule in modern central Vietnam, and Lâm Ấp, a predecessor state in the region, began its existence in 192 CE. In the 4th century CE, wars with the neighbouring Kingdom of Funan in Cambodia and the acquisition of Funanese territory led to the infusion of Indian culture into Cham society. Sanskrit was adopted as a scholarly language, and Hinduism, especially Shaivism, became the state religion. Starting from the 10th century CE, the Arab maritime trade introduces Islamic cultural and religious influences to the region. Although Hinduism was the predominant religion among the Cham people until the 16th century, Islam began to attract large numbers of Chams, when some members of the Cham royalty converted to Islam in the 17th century. Champa came to serve as an important link in the spice trade, which stretched from the Persian Gulf to South China, and later in the Arab maritime routes in Mainland Southeast Asia as a supplier of aloe.

Despite the frequent wars between the Cham and the Khmer, the two nations also traded and their cultural influences moved in the same directions. Since royal families of the two countries intermarried frequently. Champa also had close trade and cultural relations with the powerful maritime empire of Srivijaya and later with the Majapahit of the Malay Archipelago, its easternmost trade relations being with the kingdoms of Ma-i, Butuan, and Sulu in the modern Philippines.

Evidence gathered from linguistic studies around Aceh confirms that a very strong Chamic cultural influence existed in Indonesia; this is indicated by the use of the Chamic language Acehnese as the main language in the coastal regions of Aceh. Linguists believe the Acehnese language, a descendant of the Proto-Chamic language, separated from the Chamic tongue sometime in the 1st millennium AD. However, scholarly views on the precise nature of Aceh-Chamic relations vary. Tsat, a northern Chamic language spoken by the Utsul on the Hainan Island, is speculated to be separated from Cham at the time when contact between Champa and Islam had grown considerably, but precise details remain inadequate. Under Chinese language influence over Hainan, Tsat has become fully monosyllabic, while some certain shifts to monosyllabicity can be observed in Eastern Cham (in contact with Vietnamese). Eastern Cham has developed a quasi-registral, incipiently tonal system. After the fall of Vijaya Champa in 1471, another group of Cham and Chamic might have moved west, forming Haroi, which has reversal Bahnaric linguistic influences.

=== Founding legend ===
According to Cham folk legends, Champa was founded by Lady Po Nagar–the divine mother goddess of the kingdom. She came from the Moon, arrived in modern Central Vietnam and founded the kingdom, but a typhoon drifted her away and left her stranded on the coast of China, where she married a Chinese prince, and returned to Champa. The Po Nagar temple built in Nha Trang during the 8th century, and rebuilt in the 11th century was dedicated to her. Her portrayal image in the temple is said to date from 965, it is of a commanding personage seated cross-legged upon a throne. She is also worshiped by the Vietnamese, a tradition that dates back to the 11th century during the Ly dynasty period.

=== Formation and growth ===
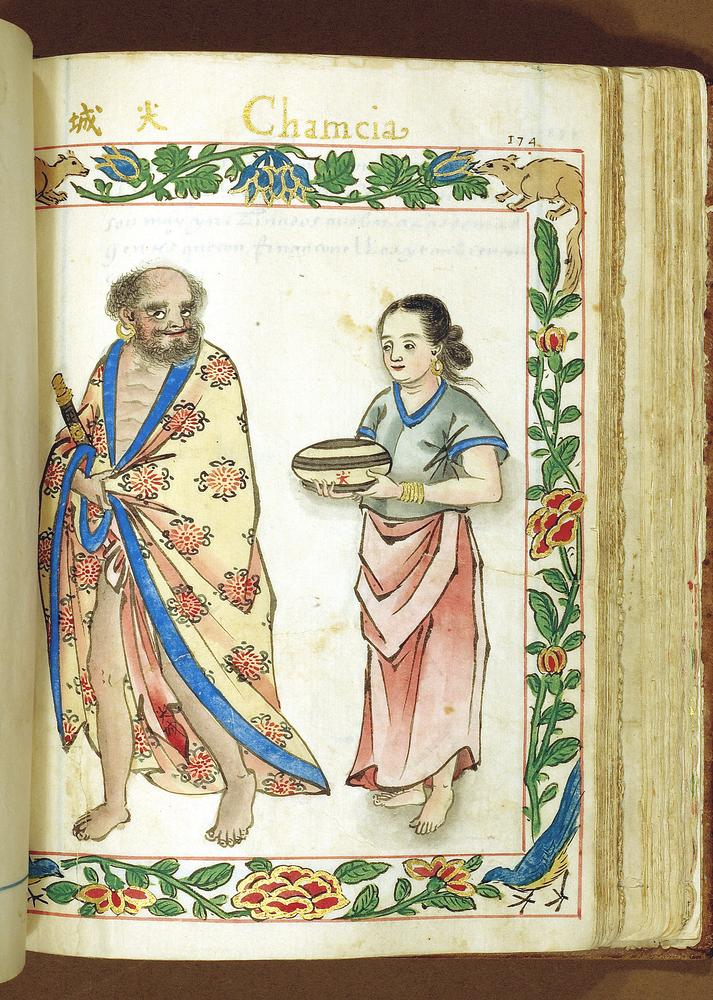
Depiction of a couple of highland man and Cham lady in the Boxer Codex from 1590

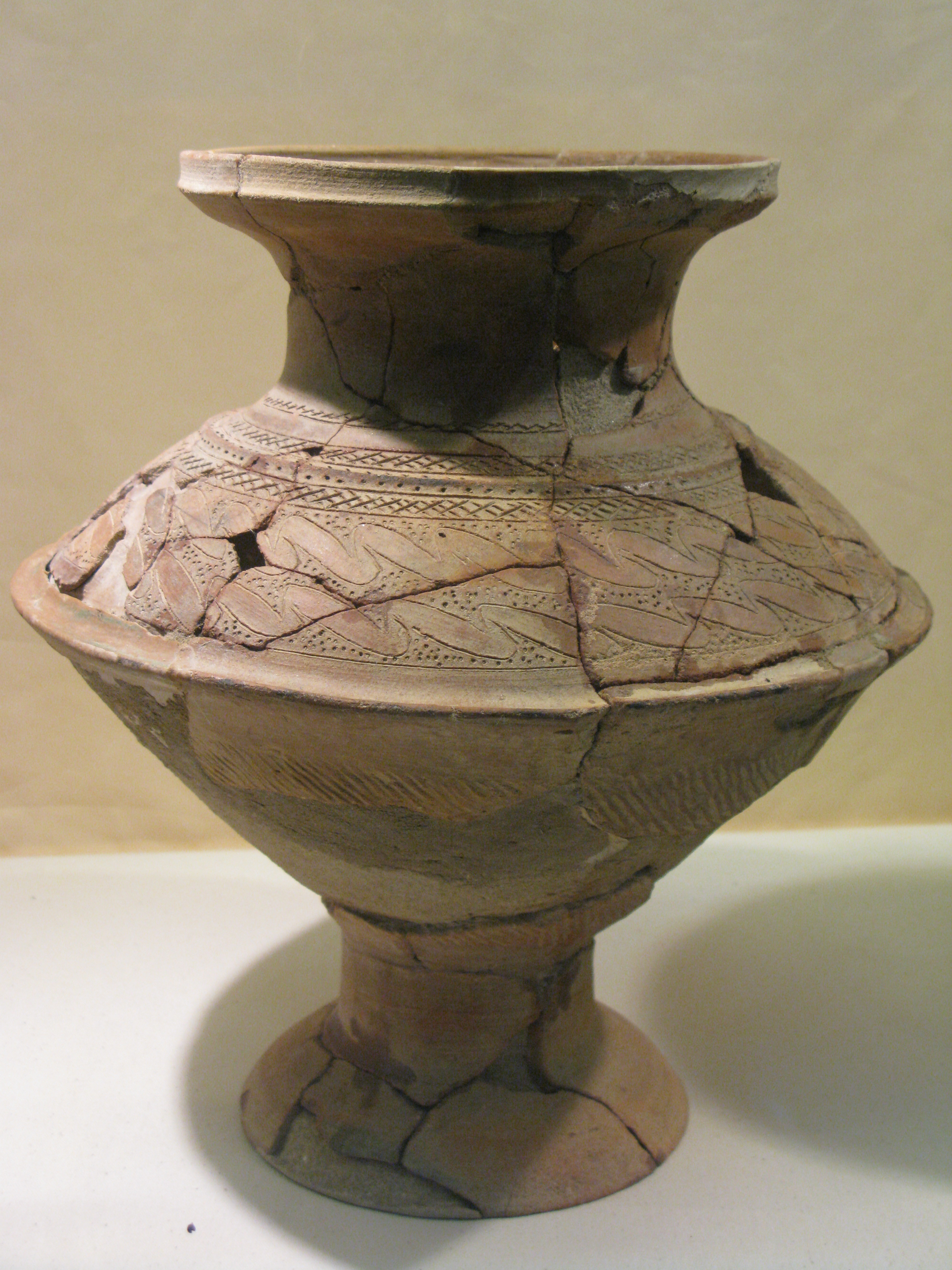
Pottery vase of the Sa Huỳnh culture, 1000 BC. The Sa Huỳnh people were the prehistoric ancestors of all Chamic peoples.

The Chams descended from seafaring settlers who reached the Southeast Asian mainland from Borneo about the time of the Sa Huỳnh culture between 1000 BC and AD 200, the predecessor of the Cham kingdom. The Cham language is part of the Austronesian family. According to one study, Cham is related most closely to modern Acehnese in northern Sumatra.

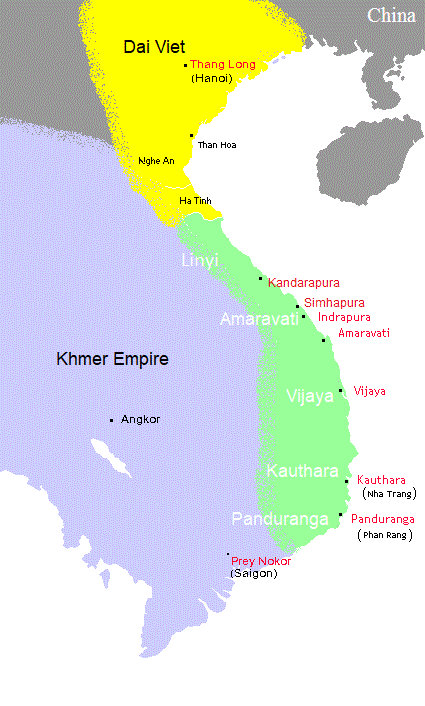
Champa (green) before 1069.

The Sa Huỳnh culture was an Austronesian seafaring culture that centred around present-day Central Vietnam coastal region. During its heyday, the culture distributed across the Central Vietnam coast and had commercial links across the South China Sea with the Philippine archipelago and even with Taiwan, which now most archaeologists and scholars have consentient determined and are no longer hesitant in linking with the ancestors of the Austronesian Cham and Chamic-speaking peoples.

While Northern Vietnam Kinh people assimilated Han Chinese immigrants into their population, have a sinicized culture, Cham people carry the patrilineal R-M17 haplogroup of South Asian Indian origin from South Asian merchants spreading Hinduism to Champa and marrying Cham females since Chams have no matrilineal South Asian mtDNA, and this fits with the matrilocal structure of Cham families. And compared to other Vietnamese ethnic groups, the Cham do not share ancestry with southern Han Chinese, along with Austronesian-speaking Mang.

Champa was known to the Chinese as 林邑 Linyi in Mandarin, Lam Yap in Cantonese and to the Vietnamese, Lâm Ấp (which is the Sino-Vietnamese pronunciation of 林邑). The state of Champa was founded in AD 192 by Khu Liên (Ou Lian), an official of the Eastern Han dynasty of China in Xianglin who rebelled against Chinese rule in 192. (Note: Historians like Vickery criticize the use of Chinese and Vietnamese sources uncritically in reconstructing the history of Champa.)

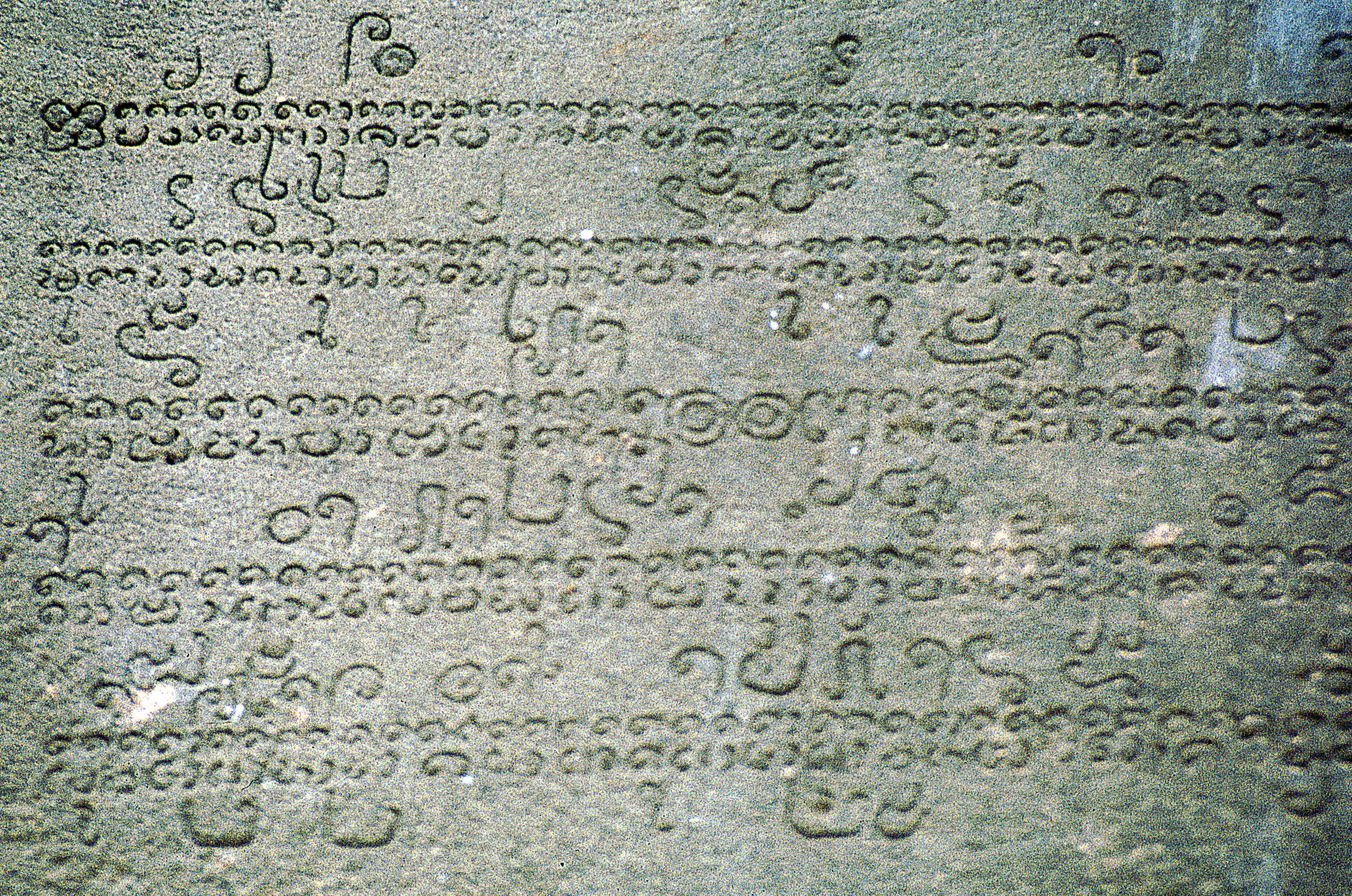
Epigraph of king Jaya Paramesvaravarman II (r. 1220–1254), the liberator of Champa from Khmer rule.

Around the 4th century AD, Cham polities began to absorb much of Indic influences, probably through its neighbour, Funan. Hinduism was established as Champa began to create Sanskrit stone inscriptions and erect red brick Hindu temples. The first king acknowledged in the inscriptions is Bhadravarman, who reigned from AD 380 to 413. At Mỹ Sơn, King Bhadravarman established a linga called Bhadresvara, whose name was a combination of the king's own name and that of the Hindu god of gods Shiva. The worship of the original god-king under the name Bhadresvara and other names continued through the centuries that followed.

Being famously known as skillful sailors and navigators, as early as the 5th century AD, the Cham might have reached India by themselves. King Gangaraja (r. 413–?) of Champa was perhaps the only known Southeast Asian ruler who traveled all the way to India shortly after his abdication. He personally went on pilgrimage in the Ganges River, Northeast India. His itinerary was confirmed by both indigenous Cham sources and Chinese chronicles. George Coedès notes that during the 2nd and 3rd century, an influx of Indian traders, priests, and scholars travelled along the early East Asia–South Asian subcontinent maritime route, could have visited and made communications with local Chamic communities along the coast of Central Vietnam. They played some roles in disseminating Indian culture and Buddhism. But that was not sustained and decisive as active "Indianized native societies," he argues, or Southeast Asian kingdoms that had already been "Indianized" like Funan, were the key factors of the process. On the other hand, Paul Mus suggests the reason for the peaceful acceptance of Hinduism by the Cham elite was likely related to the tropical monsoon climate background shared by areas like the Bay of Bengal, coastal mainland Southeast Asia all the way from Myanmar to Vietnam. Monsoon societies tended to practice animism, most importantly, the creed of earth spirit. To the early Southeast Asian peoples, Hinduism was somewhat similar to their original beliefs. This resulted in peaceful conversions to Hinduism and Buddhism in Champa with little resistance.

Rudravarman I of Champa (r. 529–572), a descendant of Gangaraja through maternal line, became king of Champa in 529. During his reign, the temple complex of Bhadresvara was destroyed by a great fire in 535/536. He was succeeded by his son Sambhuvarman (r. 572–629). He reconstructed the temple of Bhadravarman and renamed it Shambhu-bhadreshvara. In 605, the Sui Empire launched an invasion of Lam Ap, overrunning Sambhuvarman's resistance, and sacked the Cham capital at Tra Kieu. He died in 629 and was succeeded by his son, Kandarpadharma, who died in 630–31. Kandarpadharma was succeeded by his son, Prabhasadharma, who died in 645.

=== Champa at its height ===
Several granite tablets and inscriptions from My Son, Tra Kieu, Hue, Khanh Hoa dated 653–687 report a Cham king named Jaya Prakāśadharma who ascended the throne of Champa as Vikrantavarman I (r. 653–686). Prakāśadharma had thorough knowledge of Sanskrit learning, Sanskrit literature, and Indian cosmology. He authorized many constructions of religious sanctuaries at My Son and several building projects throughout the kingdom, laying down the foundations for the Champa art and architectural styles. He also sent many embassies regularly to the Tang Empire and neighbouring Khmer. The Chinese reckoned Champa during the 7th century as the chief tributary state of the South, on par with the Korean kingdoms of Koguryŏ in the Northeast and Baekje in the East – "though the latter was rivaled by Japan."

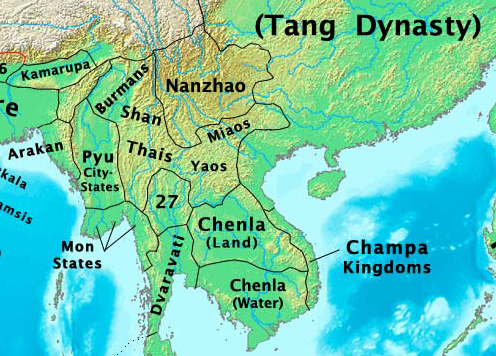
Southeast Asia c. 800. Champa situating between major medieval trade routes in Southeast Asia through the South China Sea.

Between the 7th to 10th centuries AD, the Cham polities rose to become a naval power; as Cham ports attracted local and foreign traders, Cham fleets also controlled the trade in spices and silk in the South China Sea, between China, the Indonesian archipelago and India. They supplemented their income from the trade routes not only by exporting ivory and aloe, but also by engaging in piracy and raiding. However, the rising influence of Champa caught the attention of a neighbouring thalassocracy that considered Champa as a rival, the Javanese (Javaka, probably refers to Srivijaya, ruler of the Malay Peninsula, Sumatra and Java). In 767, the Tonkin coast was raided by a Javanese fleet (Daba) and Kunlun pirates, Champa was subsequently assaulted by Javanese or Kunlun vessels in 774 and 787. In 774 an assault was launched on Po-Nagar in Nha Trang where the pirates demolished temples, while in 787 an assault was launched on Virapura, near Phan Rang. The Javanese invaders continued to occupy southern Champa coastline until being driven off by Indravarman I (r. 787–801) in 799.

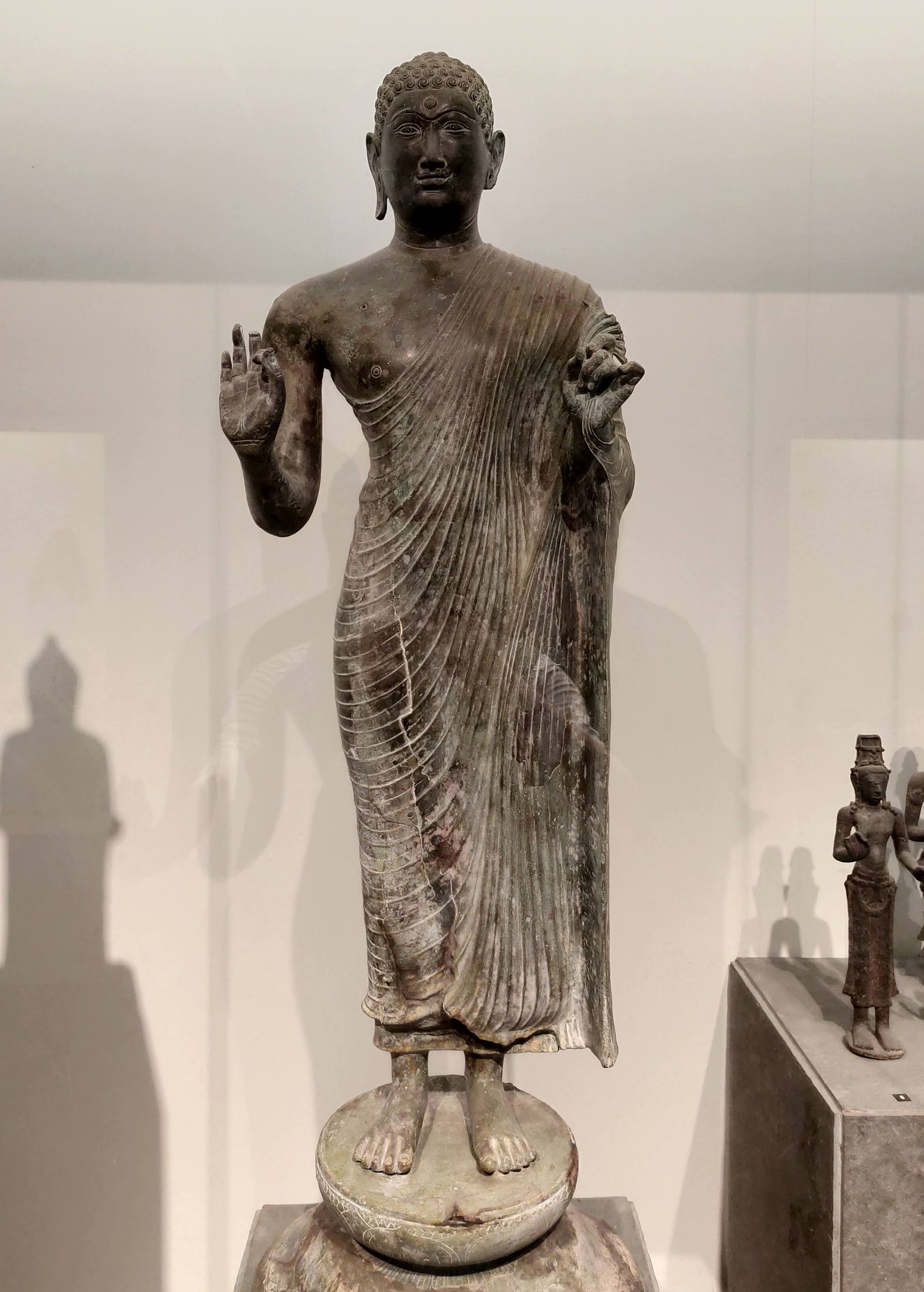
Đồng Dương (Indrapura) Buddha statue, 9th century AD. Museum of Vietnamese History

In 875, a new Buddhist dynasty founded by Indravarman II (r. ? – 893) moved the capital or the major center of Champa to the north again. Indravarman II established the city of Indrapura, near My Son and ancient Simhapura. Mahayana Buddhism eclipsed Hinduism, becoming the state religion. Art historians often attribute the period between 875 and 982 as the Golden Age of Champa art and Champa culture (distinguish with modern Cham culture). Unfortunately, a Vietnamese invasion in 982 led by king Le Hoan of Dai Viet, followed by Lưu Kế Tông (r. 986–989), a fanatical Vietnamese usurper who took the throne of Champa in 983, brought mass destruction to Northern Champa. Indrapura was still one of the major centers of Champa until being surpassed by Vijaya in the 12th century.

=== Relations with the Khmer, Viet, and the Philippine islands c. 1000–1471 ===
The History of Song notes that to the east of Champa through a two-day journey lay the country of Ma-i, speculated to be the Philippine island Mindoro; which Champa had trade relations with

Champa and what would later be the Sultanate of Sulu in the Sulu archipelago of the southern Philippines, still Hindu at that time and known as Lupah Sug, traded with each other which resulted in merchant Chams settling in Sulu from the 10th-13th centuries, establishing trading centres. There they were called Orang Dampuan and, due to their wealth, many of them were killed by native Sulu Buranuns. The Buranun were then subjected to retaliatory killings by the Orang Dampuan. Harmonious commerce between Sulu and the Orang Dampuan was later restored. The Yakan are descendants of the Taguima-based Orang Dampuan who came to Sulu from Champa.

In the early 11th century, Rajah Kiling of Butuan in northeastern Mindanao instigated a commercial rivalry with Champa by requesting diplomatic equality with them to the Song court, but was denied over favouritism for the latter. However, the successive Rajah Sri Bata Shaja succeeded by sending the flamboyant ambassador Likanhsieh, who shocked the Emperor Zhenzong by presenting a memorial engraved on a golden tablet, some white dragon (bailong 白龍) camphor, Moluccan cloves, and a South Sea slave at the eve of an important ceremonial state sacrifice.

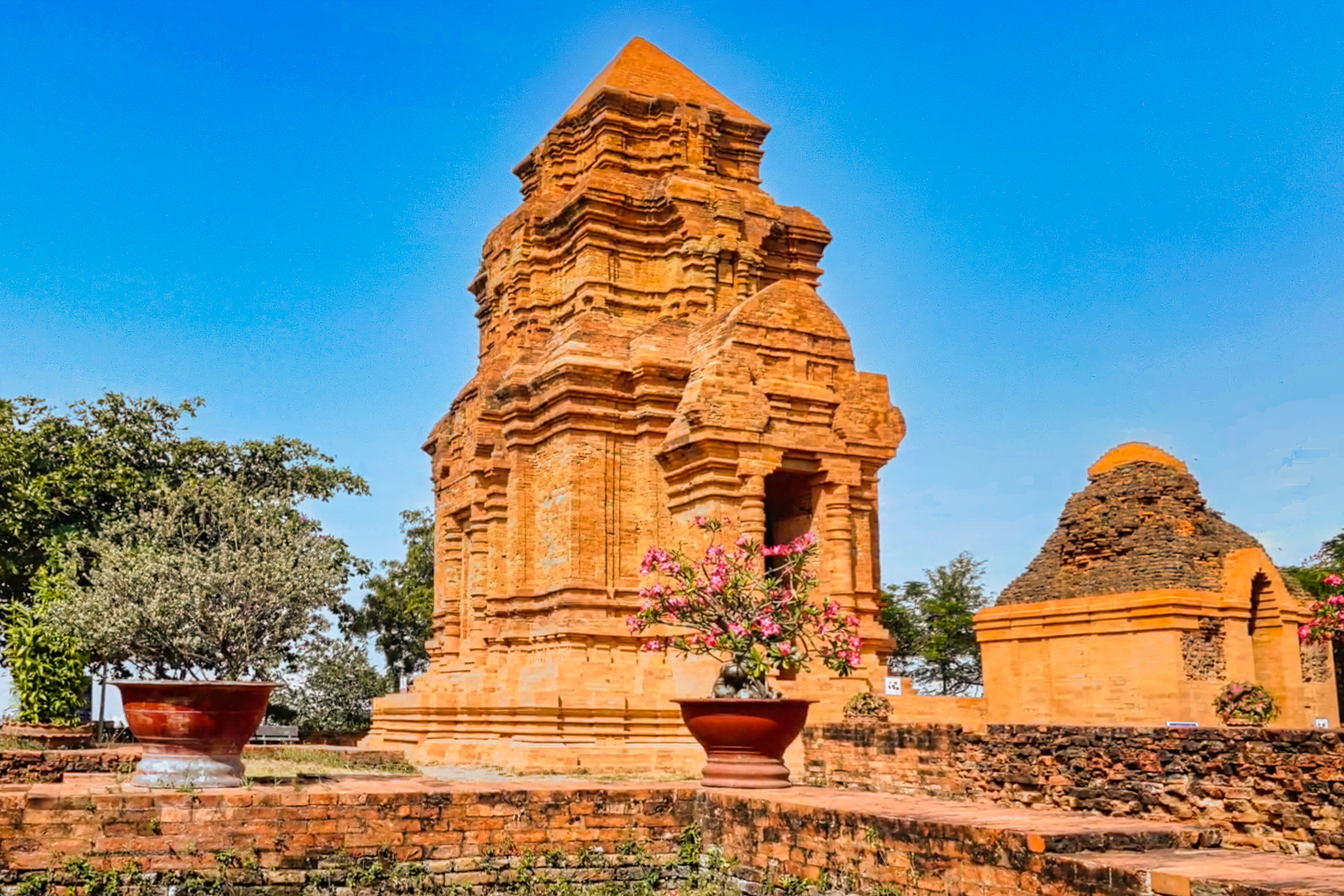
The Po Sah Inu (Ina) towers in Phan Thiết, built in the 7th or 8th century and associated with Po Sah Ina. She is the subject of various incompatible legends and myths, one making her the daughter of Shiva and the goddess Po Nagar.

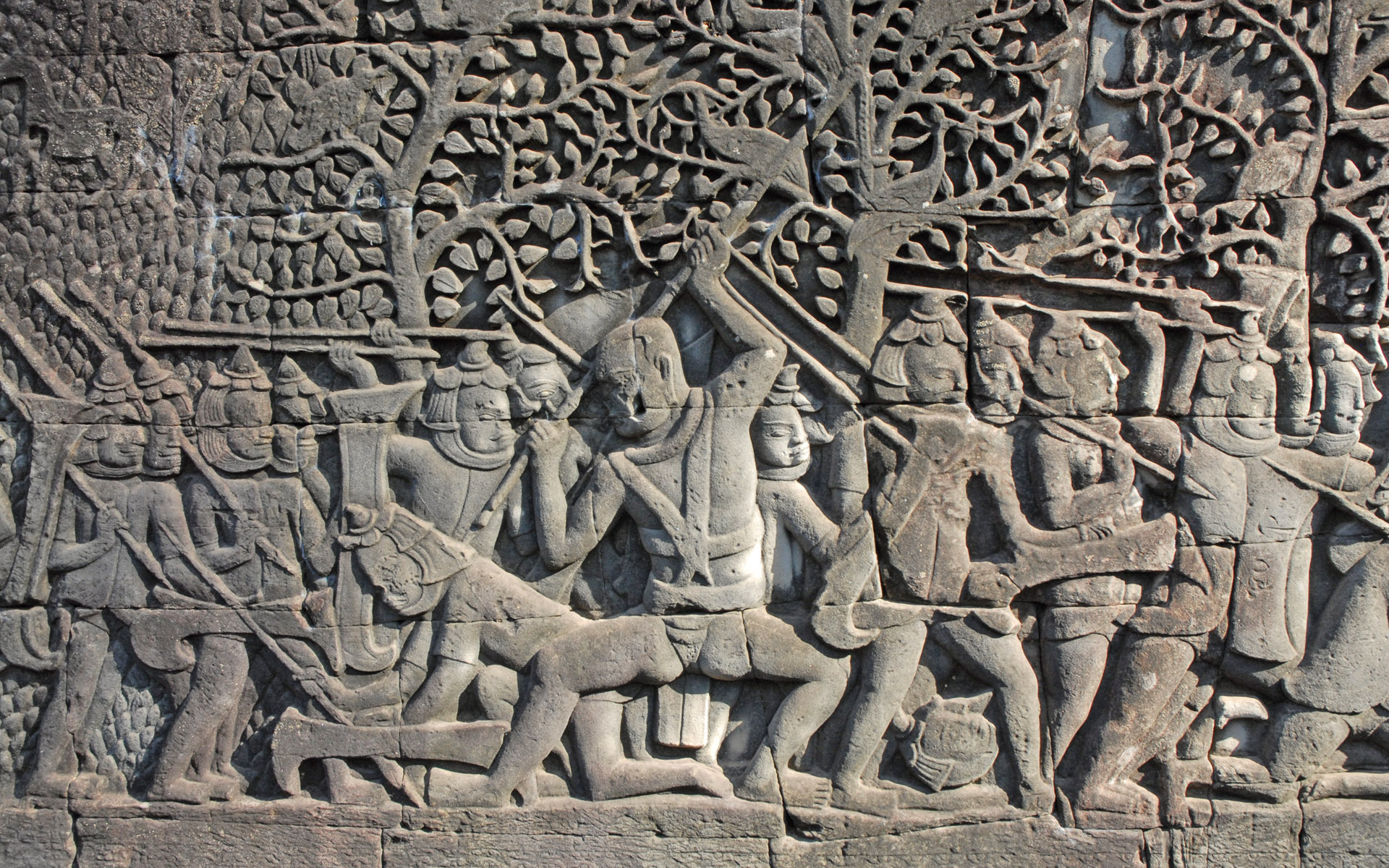
Bas reliefs from the Bayon Temple depicting battle scene between Cham (wearing helmets) and Khmer troops

The twelfth century in Champa is defined by constant social upheavals and warfare, Khmer invasions were frequent. The Khmer Empire conquered Northern Champa in 1145, but were quickly repulsed by king Jaya Harivarman I (r. 1148–1167). Another Angkorian invasion of Champa led by Suryavarman II in summer 1150 also was quickly stalled, and Suryavarman died en route. Champa then plummeted into an eleven-year civil war between Jaya Harivarman and his oppositions, which resulted in Champa reunifying under Jaya Harivarman by 1161. After having restored the kingdom and its prosperity, in June 1177 Jaya Indravarman IV (r. 1167–1192) launched a surprise naval assault on Angkor, capital of Cambodia, plundering it, slaying the Khmer king, leading to a Cham occupation of Cambodia for the next four years. Jayavarman VII of Angkor launched several counterattack campaigns in the 1190s (1190, 1192, 1194–1195, 1198–1203), conquering Champa and making it a dependency of the Khmer Empire for 30 years.

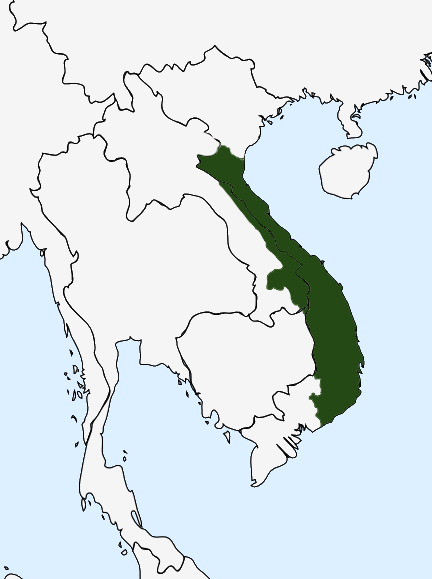
Zenith of Champa territorial expansion during the reign of Che Bong Nga (r. 1360–1390)

Champa was subjected to a Mongol Yuan invasion in 1283–1285. Before the invasion, Kublai Khan ordered the establishment of a mobile secretariat (xingsheng) in Champa for the purpose of dominating the South China Sea and the Indian Ocean trade networks. It demonstrated the strategic importance of Champa as a naval juggernaut of medieval maritime Eurasia. The Yuan campaign led by General Sogetu against the Cham began in February 1283 with their initial capture of Vijaya forcing the Cham king Indravarman V (r. 1258–1287) and Prince Harijit to wage a guerrilla resistance against the Yuan for two years, together with Dai Viet, eventually repelling the Mongols back to China by June 1285. After the Yuan wars ended decisively in 1288, Dai Viet king Trần Nhân Tông spent his retirement years in Northern Champa, and arranged a marriage between his daughter, Princess Huyền Trân, and Prince Harijit – now reigning as Jaya Simhavarman III (r. 1288–1307) – in 1306 in exchange for peace and territory. From 1307 to 1401, not even a single surviving indigenous source exists in Champa, and almost all of its 14th-century history has to rely on Chinese and Vietnamese sources. Engraving Sanskrit inscription, the prestige language of religious and political elites in Champa, stopped in 1253. No other grand temple or other construction project was built after 1300. These facts marked the beginning of Champa's decline.

From 1367 to 1390, according to Chinese and Vietnamese sources, Che Bong Nga, who ruled as king of Champa from 1360 to 1390, had restored Champa. He launched six invasions of Dai Viet during the deadly Champa–Đại Việt War (1367–1390), sacking its capital in 1371, 1377, 1378, and 1383, nearly bringing the Dai Viet to its collapse. Che Bong Nga was only stopped in 1390 on a naval battle in which the Vietnamese deployed firearms for the first time, and miraculously killed the king of Champa, ending the devastating war.

After Che Bong Nga, Champa seemingly rebounced to its status quo under a new dynasty of Jaya Simhavarman VI (r. 1390–1400). His successor Indravarman VI (r. 1400–1441) reigned for the next 41 years, expanding Champa's territory to the Mekong Delta amidst the decline of the Angkorian Empire. One of Indravarman's nephews, Prince Śrīndra-Viṣṇukīrti Virabhadravarman, became king of Champa in 1441. By the mid 15th century, Champa might have been suffering a steady dooming decline. No inscription survived after 1456. The Vietnamese under the strong king Le Thanh Tong launched an invasion of Champa in early 1471, decimating the capital of Vijaya and most of northern Champa. For early historians like Georges Maspero, "the 1471 conquest had concluded the end of the Champa Kingdom." Maspero, like other early orientalist scholars, by his logics, arbitrated the history of Champa as becoming a "worthy" subject for their study when it adapted and maintained "superior" Indian civilization.

The relationship between Champa and the Javanese states is also recorded in various historical chronicles, mainly in the 15th and 16th centuries. Especially the marriage relationship between the princesses of Champa and the kings of Java. The Cham people were also one of the main pioneers in the spread of Islam on the north coast of Central Java. One of the famous Islamic scholars of Champa descent in Java is Sunan Ampel, one of the nine Walisanga. He had a Champa mother.

=== Decline ===
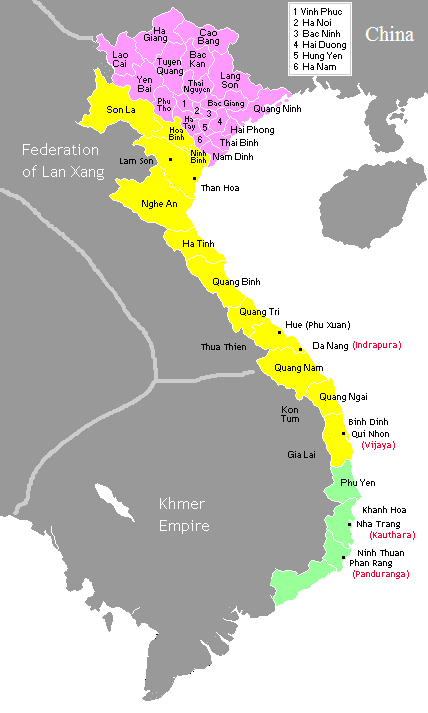
Territory of Champa (light green) after Champa–Đại Việt War (1471)

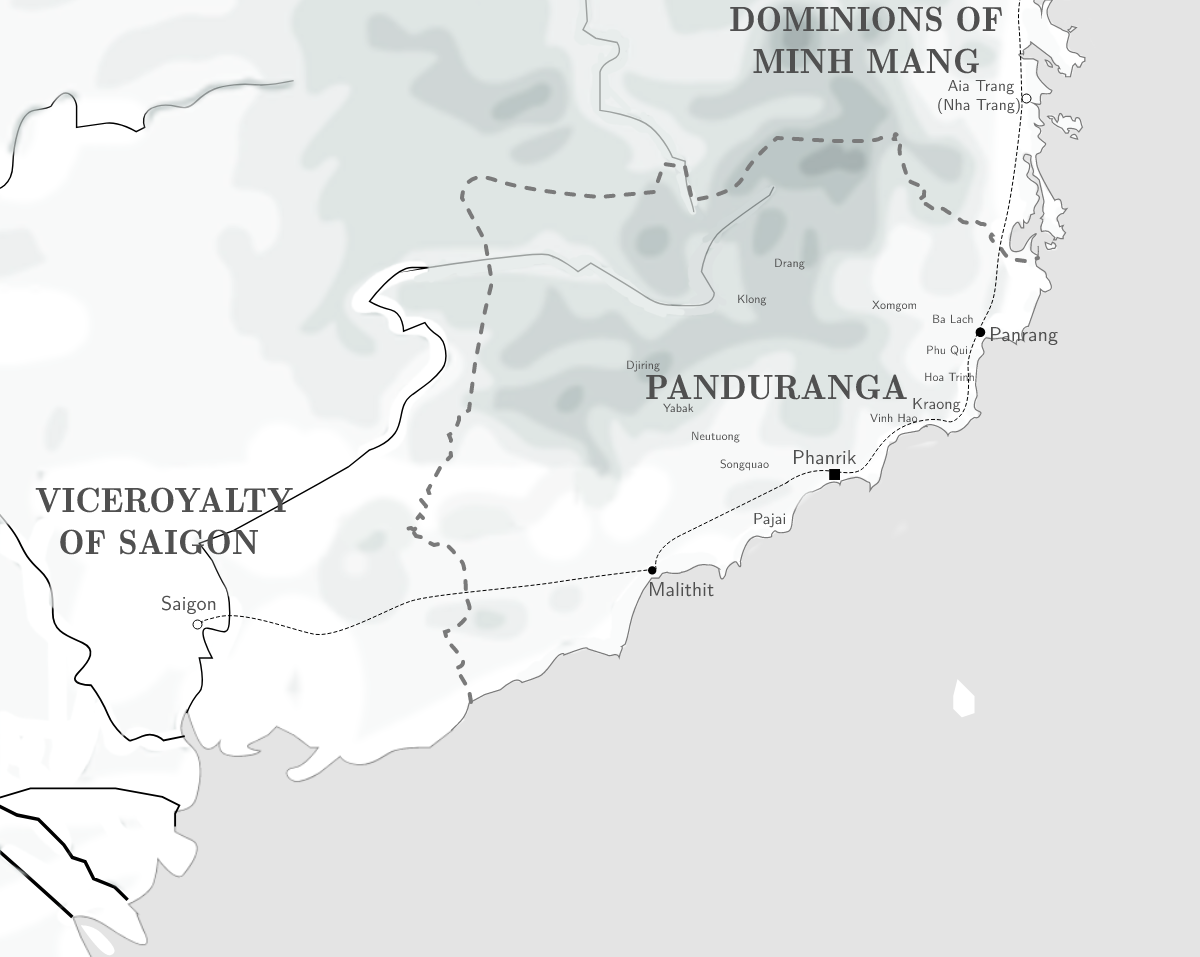
Last Cham polity (Panduranga) as vassal state of Vietnam before Vietnamese annexation in 1832.

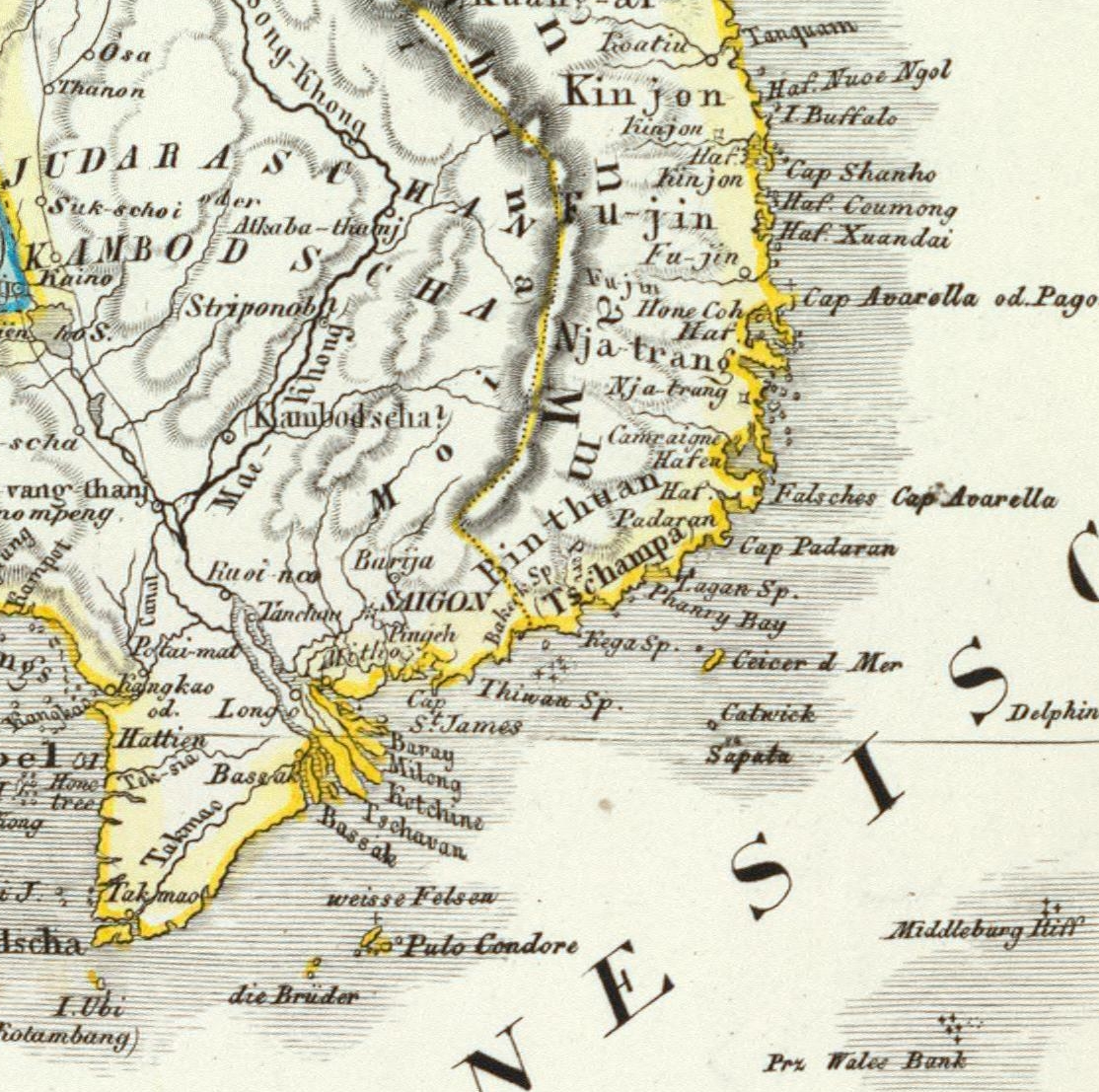
Former Cham territories after the Vietnamese annexation of Panduranga in 1832.

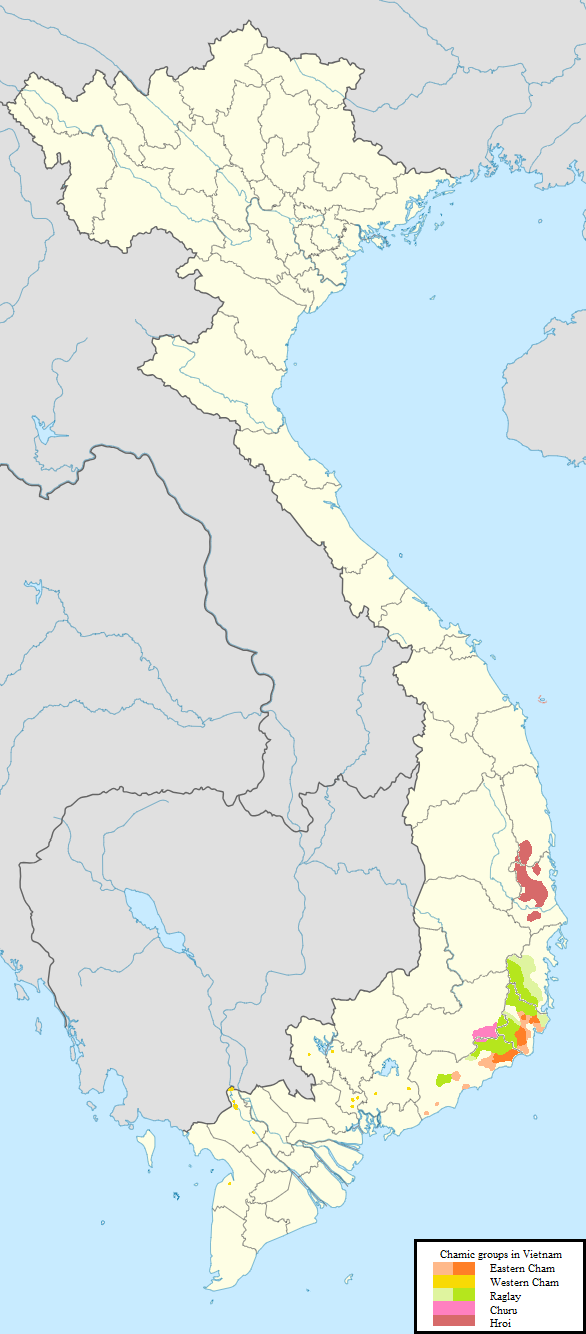
Current distribution of Chams, Roglai and Chru speakers in Vietnam.

In the Cham–Vietnamese War (1471), Champa suffered serious defeats at the hands of the Vietnamese, in which 120,000 people were either captured or killed. 50 members of the Cham royal family and some 20–30,000 were taken prisoners and deported, including the king of Champa Tra Toan, who died along his way to the north in captivity. Contemporary reports from China record a Cham envoy telling to the Chinese court: "Annam destroyed our country" with additional notes of massive burning and looting, in which 40 to 60,000 people were slaughtered. The kingdom was reduced to a small enclave near Nha Trang and Phan Rang with many Chams fleeing to Cambodia.

Champa was reduced to the principalities of Panduranga and Kauthara at the beginning of the 16th century. Kauthara was annexed by the Vietnamese in 1653. From 1799 to 1832, Panduranga lost its hereditary monarchy status, with kings selected and appointed by the Vietnamese court in Huế.

The last remaining principality of Champa, Panduranga, survived until August 1832, when Minh Mang of Vietnam began his purge against rival Le Van Duyet's faction, and accused the Cham leaders of supporting Duyet. Minh Mang ordered the last Cham king Po Phaok The and the viceroy Po Dhar Kaok to be arrested in Hue, whilst incorporating the last remnants of Champa into what are the Ninh Thuan and Binh Thuan provinces.

To enforce his tight grip, Minh Mang appointed Vietnamese bureaucrats from Hue to govern the Cham directly in phủ Ninh Thuan whilst removing the traditional Cham customary laws. Administratively, Panduranga was integrated into Vietnam proper with harsh measures. These reforms were known as cải thổ quy lưu ("replacing thổ [aboriginal] chieftains by circulating bureaucratic system"). Speaking Vietnamese and following Vietnamese customs became strictly mandatory for the Cham subjects. Cham culture and Cham identity were swiftly and systematically destroyed. Vietnamese settlers seized most of Cham farmlands and commodity productions, pushing the Cham to far-inland arid highlands, and the Cham were subjected to heavy taxations and mandated conscriptions. Two widespread Cham revolts against Minh Mang's oppression arose in 1833–1835, the latter led by khatib Ja Thak Wa – a Cham Bani cleric – which was more successful and even briefly refounded a Cham state for a short period of time, before being crushed by Minh Mang's forces.

The unfortunate defeat of the people of Panduranga in their struggle against Vietnamese oppression also sealed their and remnant of Champa's fate. A large chunk of the Cham in Panduranga were subjected to forced assimilation by the Vietnamese, while many Cham, including indigenous highland peoples, were indiscriminately killed by the Vietnamese in massacres, particularly from 1832 to 1836, during the Sumat and Ja Thak Wa uprisings. Bani mosques were razed to the ground. Temples were set on fire. Cham villages and their aquatic livelihoods were annihilated. By that time, the Cham totally lost their ancestors' seafaring and shipbuilding traditions.

After finalizing these heavy-handed pacifications of Cham rebels and assimilation policies, emperor Minh Mang declared the Cham of Panduranga a Tân Dân (new people), denoting the imposed mundanity that nothing to ever differentiate them with other Vietnamese. Minh Mang's son and successor Thiệu Trị, however, revoked most of his father's strict policies against Catholic Christians and ethnic minorities. Under Thiệu Trị and Tu Duc, the Cham were again allowed to practise their religions with little prohibition.

Only a small fraction, or about 40,000 Cham people in the old Panduranga remained in 1885 when the French completed their acquisition of Vietnam. The French colonial administration prohibited Kinh discrimination and prejudice against Cham and indigenous highland peoples, putting an end to Vietnamese cultural genocide of the Cham. But French colonialists also exploited the ethnic hatred in situ between Vietnamese and Cham to deal with remnant of the Can Vuong movement in Binh Thuan.

== Government ==
=== King ===
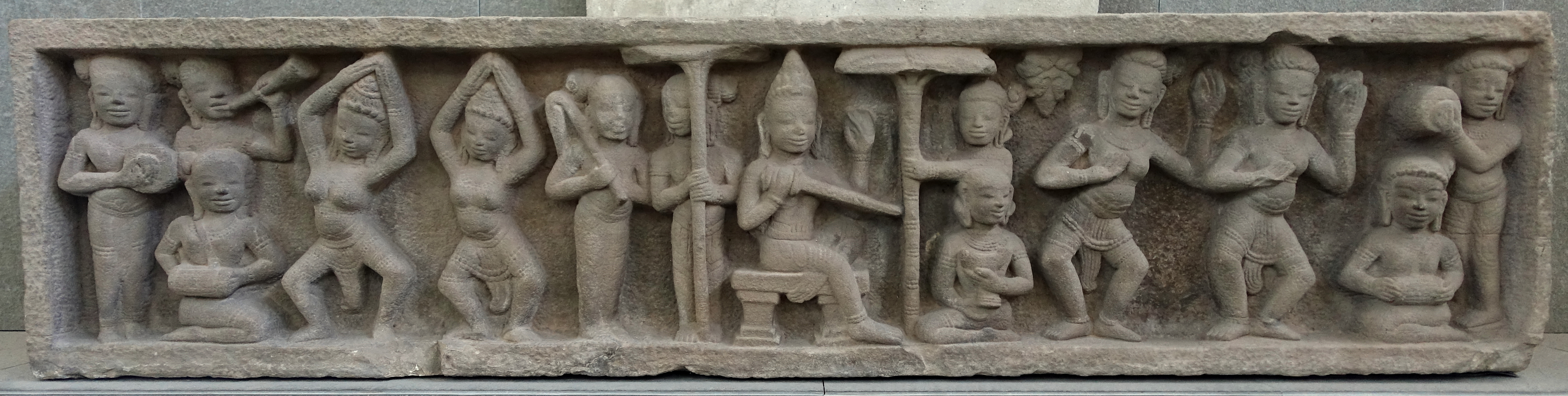
11th-century sculpture depicting the court of Champa with king, court officials, and servants. Museum of Cham Sculpture.

The King of Champa is the title ruler of Champa. Champa rulers often use two Hinduist style titles: raja-di-raja (राजाधिराजः "raja of rajas" or king of kings: written here in Devanagari since the Cham used their own Cham script) or pu po tana raya ("lord of all territories"). They would be addressed by style ganreh patrai (his Majesty). Officially, the king was the patron of art and construction. Majestic temples and shrines were built dedicated to the honor of the king of kings, his ancestors, and their beloved gods (usually Śiva). Some charismatic Cham kings declared themselves Protector of Champa in celebrating royal ceremony and coronation (abhiseka) which involves supernatural and spiritual rituals to demonstrate the king's authority.

The regnal name of the Champa rulers originated from the Hindu tradition, often consisting of titles and aliases. Titles (prefix) like: Jaya (जय "victory"), Maha (महा "great"), Sri (श्री "glory"). Aliases (stem) like: Bhadravarman, Vikrantavarman, Rudravarman, Simhavarman, Indravarman, Paramesvaravarman, Harivarman... Among them, the suffix -varman belongs to the Kshatriya class and is only for those leaders of the Champa Alliance.

Started from the 17th century, Champa kings used title Paduka Seri Sultan in some occasions, a borrowed honorific from Muslim Malay rulers.

The 13th-century Chinese gazetteer account Zhu Fan Zhi (c. 1225) describes the Cham king 'wears a headdress of gold and adorns his body with strings of jewels' and either rides on an elephant or is lifted on a 'cloth hammock by four men' when he goes outside the palace. When the king attends the court audience, he is encircled by 'thirty female attendants who carry swords and shields or betel nuts'. Court officials would make reports to the king, then make one prostration before leaving.

The last king of Champa, Po Phaok The, was deposed by Minh Mạng in 1832.

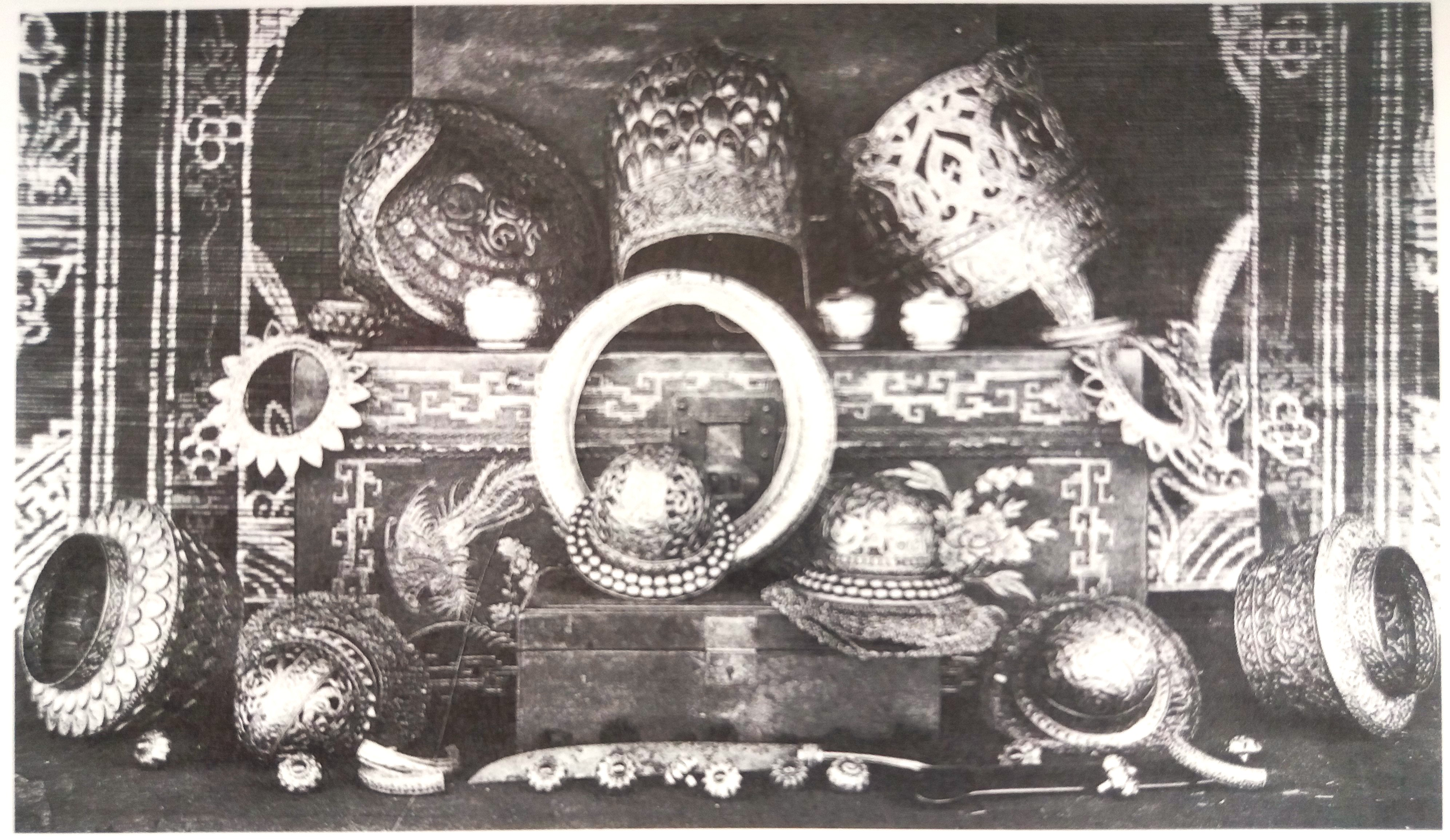
The treasure of the Cham kings: tiaras, bracelets, jewelry and other objects. Photograph from around 1900.

=== Administration ===
During the reign of the king Prakasadharma (r. 653–686 AD), when Champa was briefly ruled by a strong monarch, the territories of the kingdom stretch from present-day Quảng Bình to Khánh Hòa. An internal division called viṣaya (district) was first introduced. There were at least two viṣaya: Caum and Midit. Each of them has a handful number of local koṣṭhāgāras – known as 'source of stable income to upkeep the worship of three gods.

During the twelfth and thirteenth centuries, northern Champa was consisted by several known districts (viṣaya, zhou 洲): Amaravati (Quảng Ngãi), Ulik (Thừa Thiên–Huế), Vvyar (Quảng Trị), Jriy (southern Quảng Bình), and Traik (northern Quảng Bình). Other junctions like Panduranga remained quietly autonomous.

=== Federation or absolutism? ===
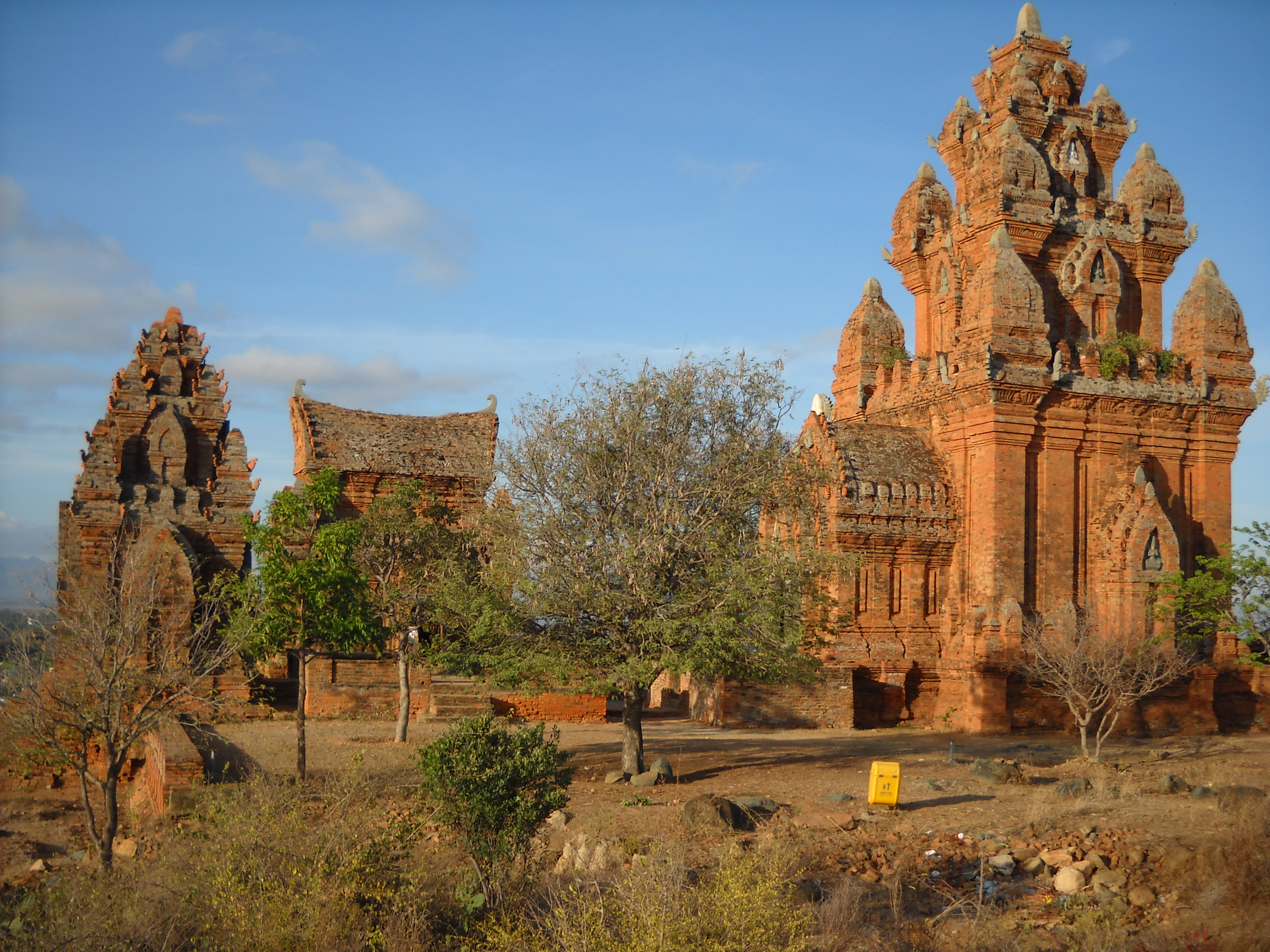
The Po Klong Garai Temple, Phan Rang–Tháp Chàm, constructed in 1252.

The classical narrative of 'the Champa Kingdom' brought by earlier generations of scholarship, Georges Maspero and George Coedes, created the illusion of a unified Champa. Recent revisionist historians in the 1980s, for example Po Dharma and Trần Quốc Vượng, refuted the concept of single Champa. Chinese historical texts, Cham inscriptions, and especially the Cham annals, the Sakkarai dak rai patao, both confirm the existence of multi-Campa scenarios. Po Dharma argues that Champa was not a single kingdom or centralized in the manner of Đại Việt but likely a confederation of kingdom(s) and individual city-states for most of its history. For several periods from the 700s to 1471, there was the king of kings or the overlord based out of the most significant powerful cities like Indrapura and Vijaya, who wielded more power, influence, and sense of unity over the other Cham kings and princes, and perhaps those minor local kings and princes (Yuvarāja – not necessary mean crown prince) or regional military commander/warlords (senāpati) were from local associates that had no connection with the dominant ruling dynasty or could be a member of that royal lineage within the perimeter of the mandala. Mandala is the term coined by O. W. Wolters describing the distribution of state power among small states within large kingdoms in premodern Southeast Asia.

Two notable examples of this multi-centric nature of Champa were the principalities of Kauthara and Pāṇḍuraṅga. When Northern Champa and Vijaya fell to the Vietnamese in 1471, Kauthara and Pāṇḍuraṅga persisted existing untouched. Kauthara fell to the Vietnamese 200 years later in 1653, while Panduranga was annexed in 1832. Pāṇḍuraṅga had its full list of kings ruled from the 13th century until 1832, which both Vietnamese and European sources had verified. So Pāṇḍuraṅga remained autonomous and could conduct its foreign affairs without permission from the court of the king of kings. (Note: Vickery conjectures that by the 1100s, North (Indrapura, Amaravati, Vijaya) and South Champa (Kauthara, Panduranga) had become quite separate.) (Note: However, there were two exceptional periods in Cham history when multiple Cham and foreign sources firmly indicated that there was only single king exercising strong authority over the whole Cham realms during given period. They were Jaya Harivarman I of the mid-12th century and the Virabhadravarmadevas (Indravarman VI and Virabhadravarman) of the early 15th century.)

According to the Huanghua Sidaji (皇華四達記, c. 800 AD?), which then was complied into the Old Book of Tang, a Tang prime minister named Jia Dan detailing his itineraries to Champa, began with his arrival in a northern Cham state called Huánwáng (環王國), probably located in modern-day Quảng Trị that had invaded the Tang southernmost province of Annan in 803. The center of Champa by the late 8th and early 9th centuries was in the south, in Gǔdá Guó 古笪國 (Kauthara), Bēntuólàng 奔陀浪洲 (Pāṇḍuraṅga). Chinese texts from 758 to 809 referred to the whole of Champa as Huánwáng, but it must be a convenient way for the Chinese to assume the name of a state that had deployed diplomacy and war with them to be the toponym for all territories of the Cham confederation. The Cham assaulted the Tang and seized Nghệ An in 803. The Chinese barely defeated the Cham and recovered lost regions in 809. Harivarman I (r. 803–?) left a document in Po Nagar Temple (Nha Trang) dating from 817, explaining his campaign in northern Champa to expel the Chinese ("Cinas" in the inscription, today lauv in modern Cham language) when they menaced to the northern Cham states.

=== Military ===
The Champa kingdom had a relatively small and poorly-organized army compared to its powerful neighbours, the Khmer and Dai Viet empires. They did not have a well-defined military hierarchy with ranks like modern armies. However, distinctions were likely made between ordinary soldiers, officers, and high-ranking leaders. Their ranks consists of a commander-in-chief (Tien tong), generals (Tong binh), colonels (Tien si), and captains (Si binh). The officers in the Champa military were likely appointed by the king or other high-ranking officials. Their responsibilities might have included training and leading troops, as well as managing logistics and supplies. The high-ranking leaders in the Champa military such as generals were likely members of the royal family or other nobility and the low-ranking leaders were likely commoners. The generals were responsible for leading armies, while the colonels lead regiments and battalions and captains led companies. They have had overall command of the army and were responsible for making strategic decisions and negotiating alliances with other powers. The Champa Navy was a formidable force that allowed the Chams to dominate trade and commerce in Southeast Asia. Their navy was used for warfare and exploration, marketing, and transportation of goods. The Chams were known for their seafaring skills, and they had established trade routes across the Indian Ocean and the South China Sea, which allowed them to trade with other kingdoms and empires in the region.

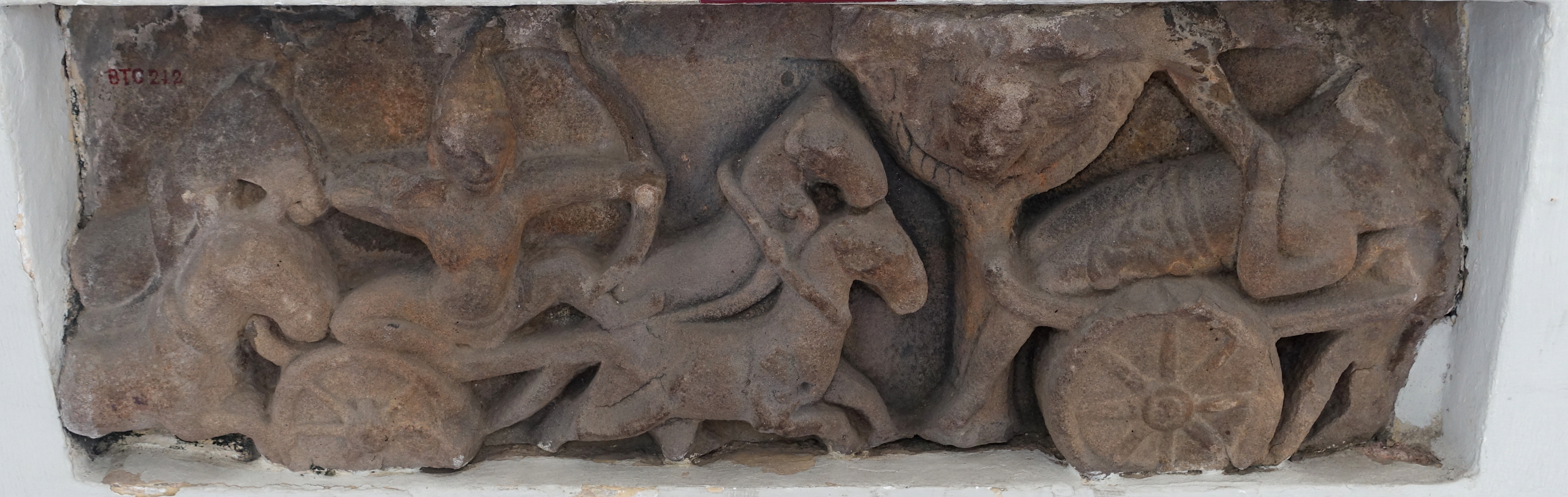
Sculpture of Cham mounted archers on chariots. c. 11th–13th century.

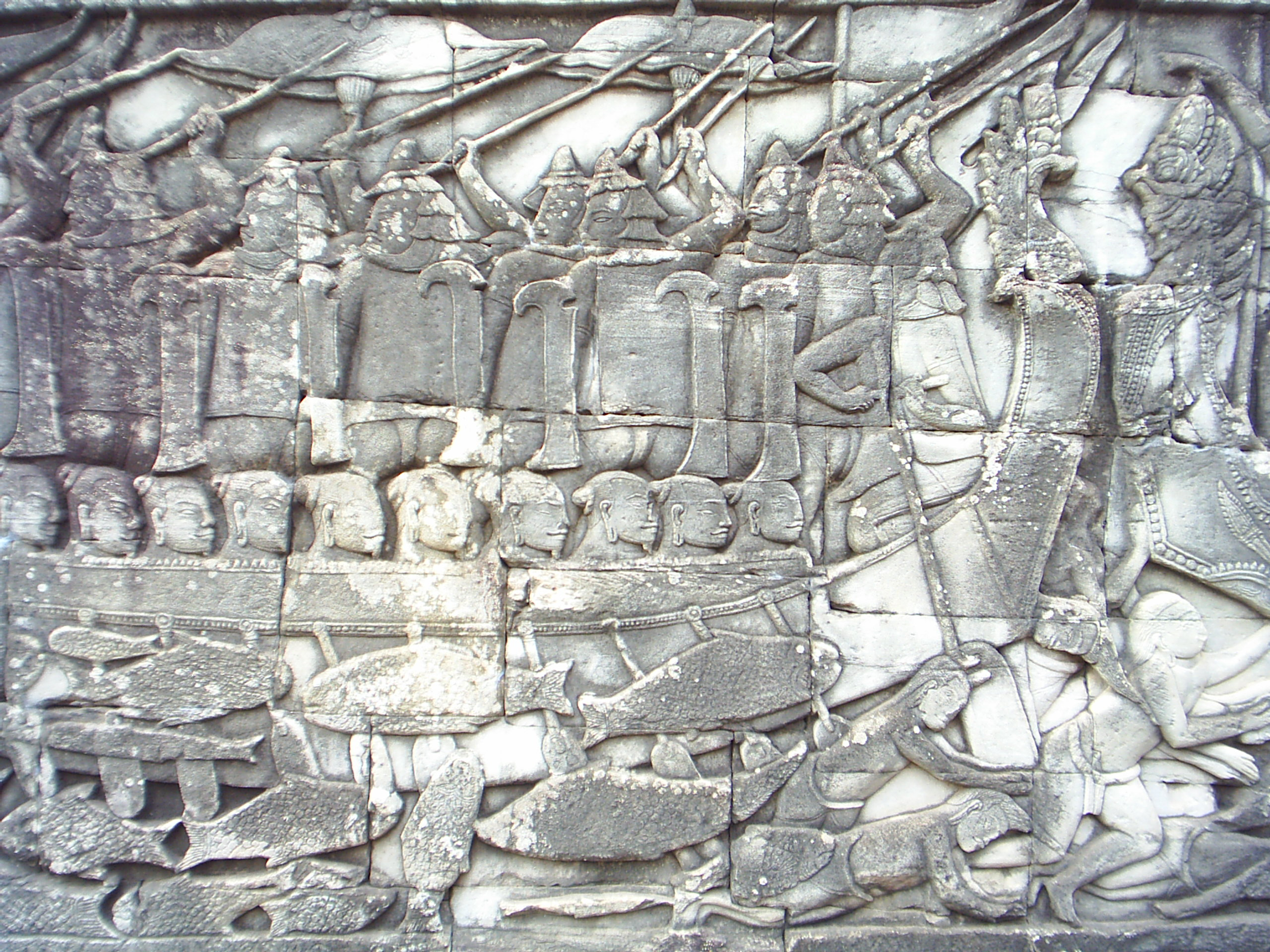
Depiction of a Cham–Khmer naval battle, stone relief at the Bayon.

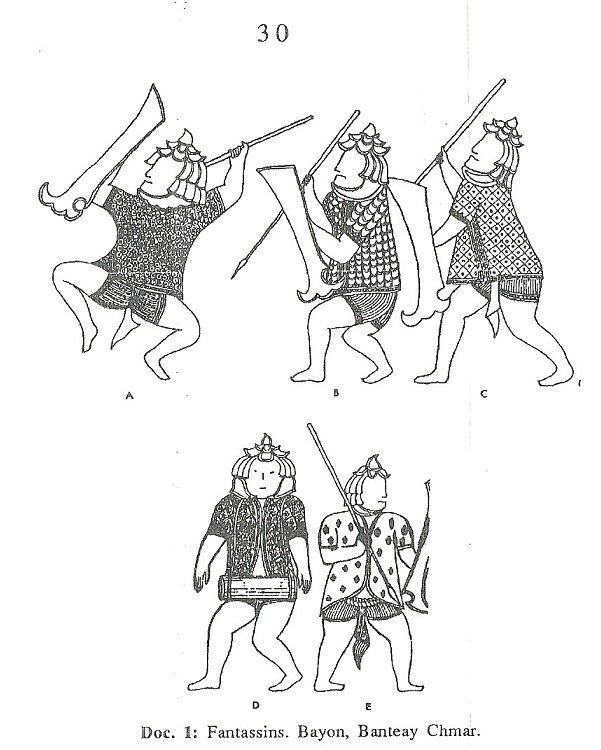
12th-century Champa marines wore various armor.

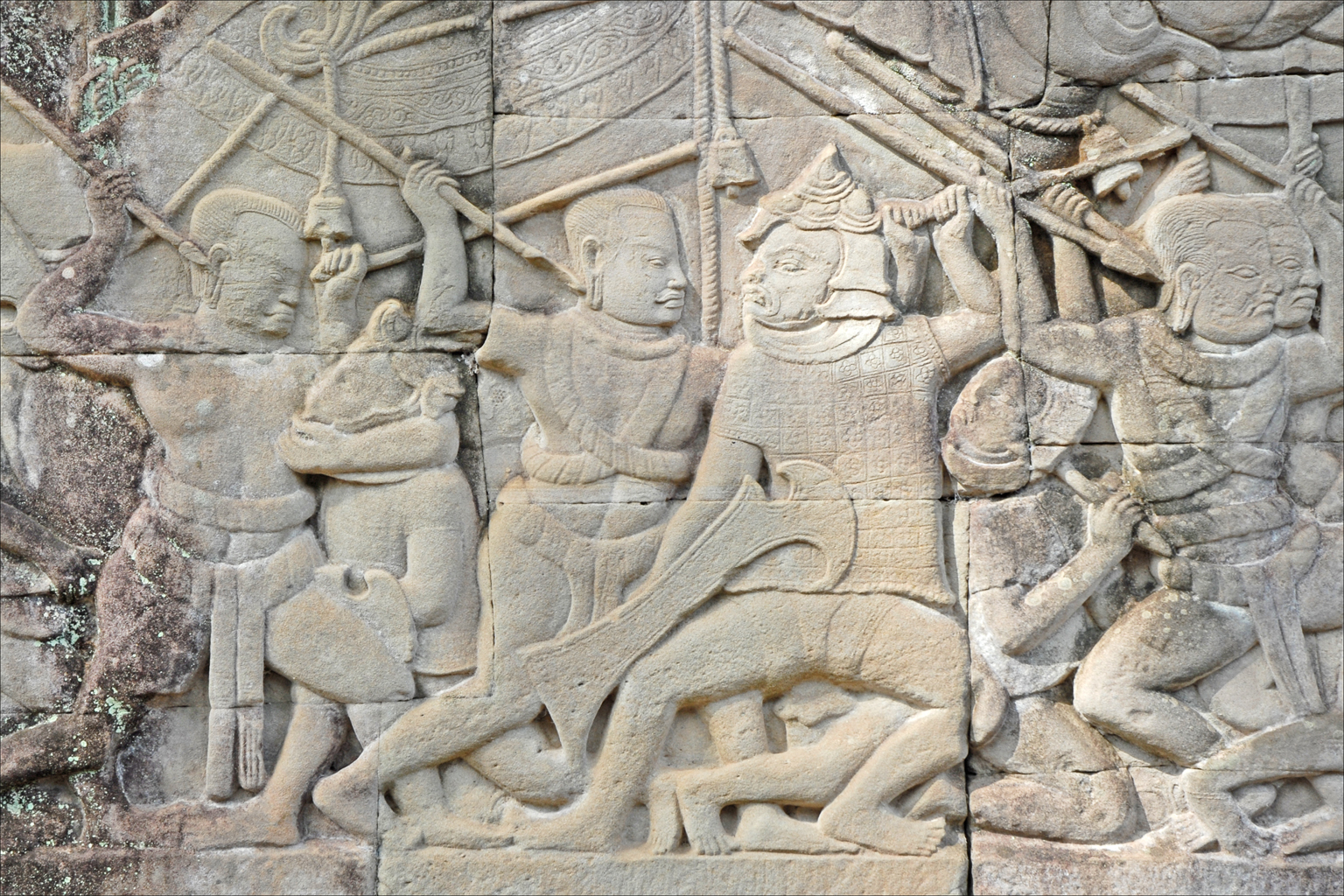
Cham soldier in helmet fighting Khmer soldier, Bas-relief at Bayon temple in Cambodia

== Geography of historical Champa ==
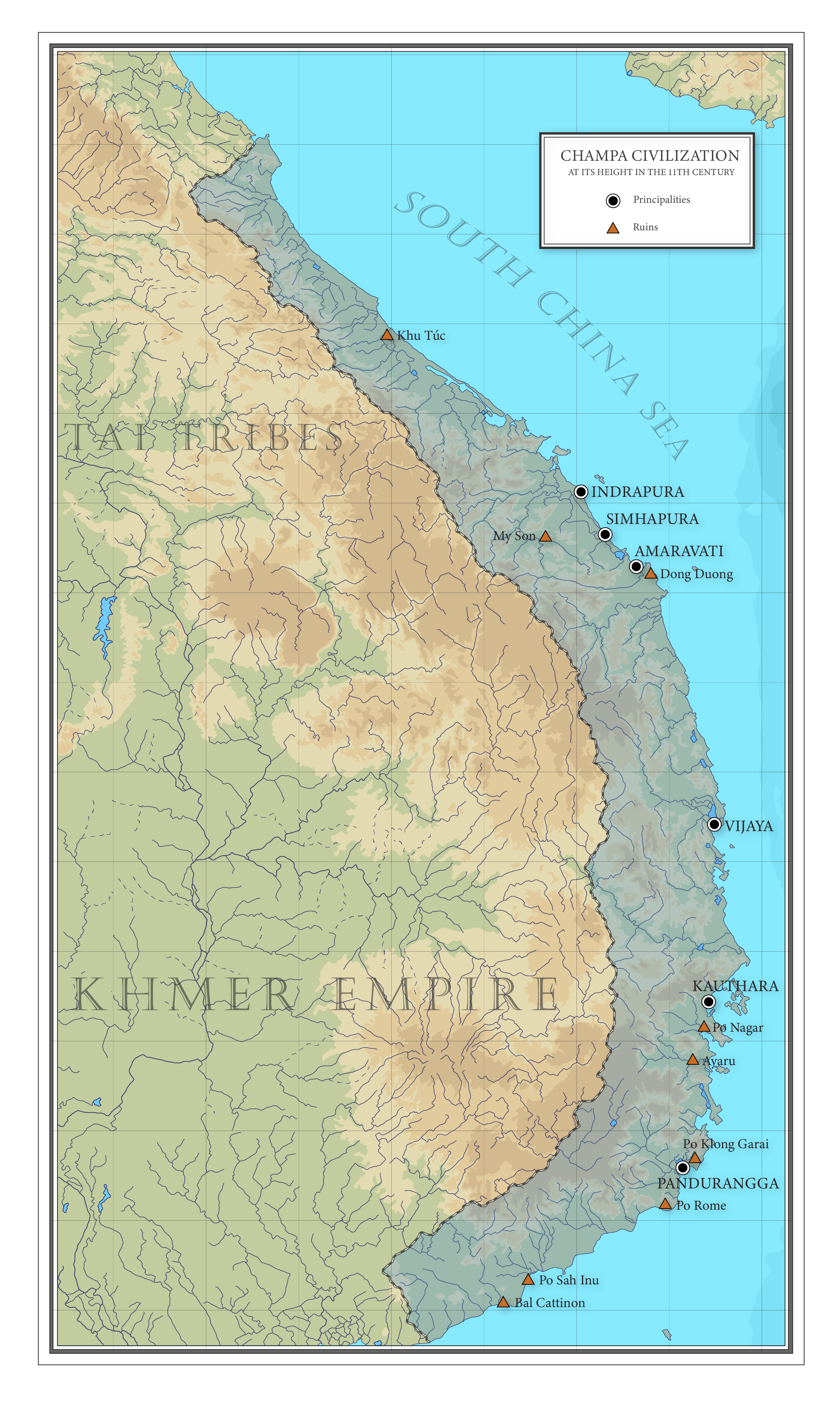
Champa (ca. 11th century) at its greatest extent

Between the 2nd and the 15th centuries CE, Champa's territorial extent at times included the modern provinces of Quảng Bình, Quảng Trị, Huế, Da Nang, Quảng Nam, Quảng Ngãi, Bình Định, Phú Yên, Khánh Hòa, Ninh Thuận, and Bình Thuận, and most of the Central Highlands might have been lightly governed or influenced by coastal Cham. (Note: Although evidence of an ancient Cham presence has been found as far north as Quảng Bình province, the group's present numbers in Vietnam are confined to small areas along the south-central coast (Bình Thuận and Ninh Thuận) and the Cambodian border.) (Note: The proximity of various highland peoples to the coastal areas, the linguistic and cultural ties some of them (notably the Rhadé, Jarai, Roglai, and Chru) shared with the Cham, and the scattered archaeological evidence of a historical Cham presence in the Central Highlands were all clearly recognized. In general, however, the French perceived these upland groups as at best peripheral to Champa proper, and they only appear in the narrative as hostile "barbarians" mentioned in certain Cham inscriptions.) Though Cham territory included the mountainous zones west of the coastal plain and (at times) extended into present-day Laos, for the most part, the Cham remained a seafaring people dedicated to trading and maintained few settlements of any size away from the coast. Scholarships also hold consensus that Champa, like Dai Viet, was always polyethnic and ethnic flexible, not just the Cham people alone, but also encompassed several different ethnic groups such as Jarai, Rhadé, and Bahnar/Bahnaric-speaking and Katuic-speaking peoples. It is clear that the Katuic-speaking and Bahnaric-speaking peoples of the Central Highlands in Vietnam and Central Laos had been engaged in a long, direct and complex contact with Chamic-speaking peoples, resulting in Chamic mutual lexical similarities of the two Austroasiatic ethnolinguistic groups, although it is highly likely that most of these borrowings came to Katuics and Bahnarics via the Highland Chamics. Others argue that Cham rule once might have stretched as far west as the Mekong River in the present-day Lao province of Campassak. However, boundaries between premodern Southeast Asian states in most cases were remote hinterlands, extreme mountains and limestones covered by thick jungles with few inland trade routes, and can not be accurately determined.

Historical Champa consisted of up to five principalities:

- Indrapura ("City of Indra", Foshi, Phật thành/Phật thệ thành) was the capital of Champa from about 875 to about 1100. It was located at the site of the modern village of Đồng Dương, near the modern city of Da Nang. Also found in the region of Da Nang is the ancient Cham city of Singhapura ("City of the Lion"), the location of which has been identified with an archaeological site in the modern village of Trà Kiệu, and the valley of Mỹ Sơn, where a number of ruined temples and towers can still be seen. The associated port was at modern Hội An. The territory once controlled by this principality included present-day Quảng Bình, Quảng Trị, and Huế.
- Amaravati was located in present-day Châu Sa citadel of Quảng Ngãi Province. The earliest mention of Amaravati is from an 1160 CE inscription at Po Nagar.

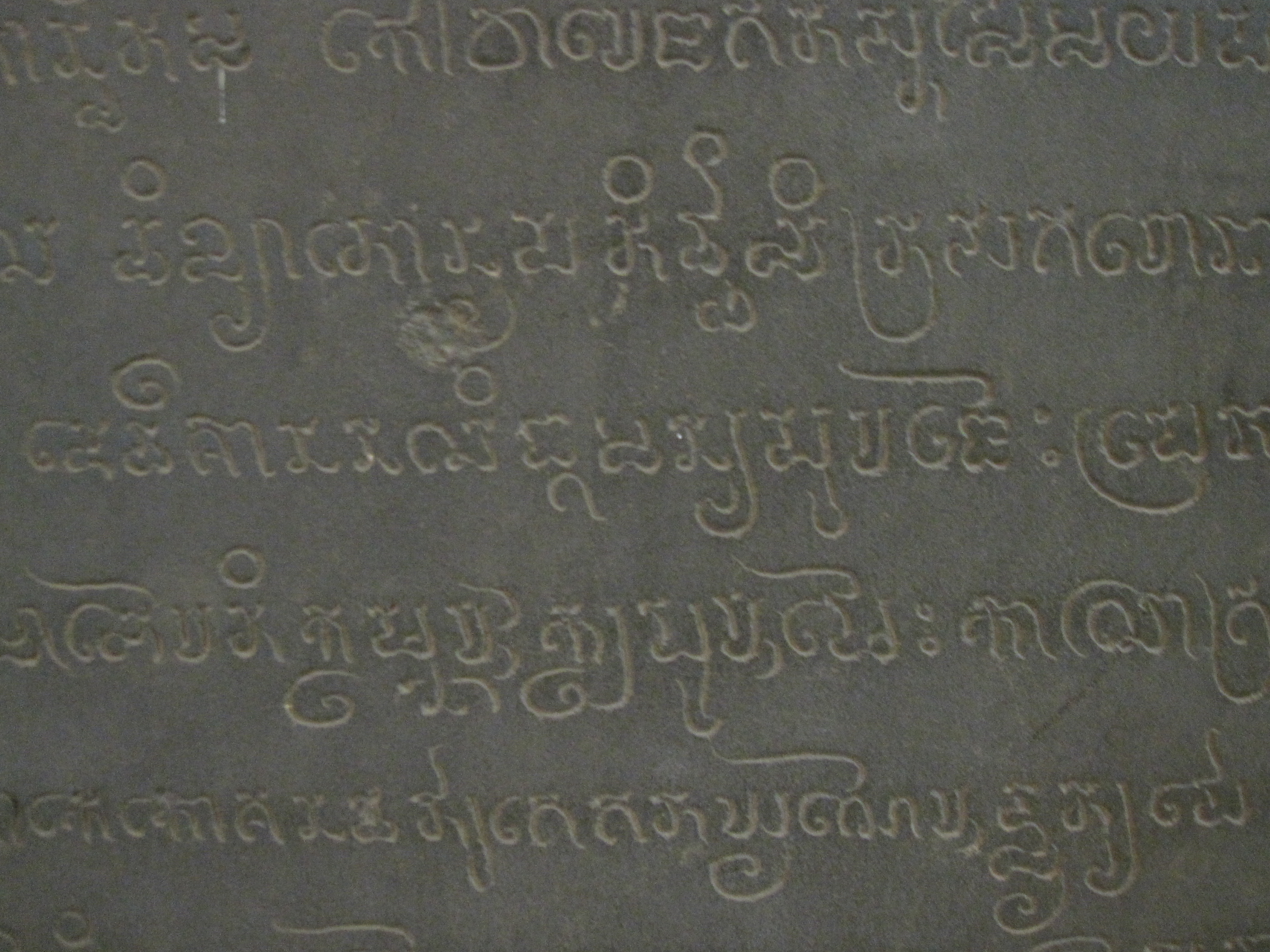
Closeup of the inscription in Cham script on the Po Nagar stele, 965. The stele describes feats by King Jaya Indravarman I (r. 960–972).

- Vijaya was located in present-day Bình Định Province (Tumpraukvijaya). Early mention is made of Vijaya in an 1160 inscription at Po Nagar. The capital has been identified with the archaeological site at Cha Ban. The associated port was at present-day Qui Nhơn. Important excavations have also been conducted at nearby Tháp Mắm, which may have been a religious and cultural centre. Vijaya became the political and cultural center of Champa around the 1150s. It remained the center of Champa until 1471, when it was sacked by the Việt and the center of Champa was again displaced toward the south. In its time, the principality of Vijaya controlled much of present-day Quang Nam, Quang Ngai, Bình Định, and Phú Yên (Aia Ru) Provinces.
- Kauthara was located in the area of modern Nha Trang (Aia Trang) in Khánh Hòa Province (Yanpunagara). Its religious and cultural center was the temple of Po Nagar, several towers of which still stand at Nha Trang. Kauthara is first mentioned in a 784 inscription at Po Nagar.
- Panduranga was located in the area of present-day Phan Rang–Tháp Chàm (Pan Rang) in Ninh Thuận and Bình Thuận province. The name Phan Rang originates from this principality. Its successor, Principality of Thuận Thành, was the last of the Cham territories to be annexed by the Vietnamese. Panduranga was the most autonomous, sometimes independent, princedom/principality of Champa. It is first mentioned in an 817 CE inscription at Po Nagar.

Within the four principalities were two main clans: the "Dừa" (means "coconut" in Vietnamese) and the "Cau" (means "areca catechu" in Vietnamese). The Dừa lived in Amravati and Vijaya, while the Cau lived in Kauthara and Panduranga. The two clans differed in their customs and habits and conflicting interests led to many clashes and even war. But they usually managed to settle disagreements through intermarriage.

== Religion ==
Champa was a religiously tolerant kingdom, where many different faiths coexisted peacefully or merged with indigenous Cham beliefs. Religiously and culturally, the Chams were grouped into three major religio-cultural groups; the Balamon Chams (also called Cham Ahiér) that adhere to an indigenized form of Islam and Hinduism; Bani Chams that adhere to an indigenized form of Islam; and finally the Cham Muslims, who follow mainstream Sunni Islam of Shafi'i school. These three groups mostly live in separate villages. Intermarriage was prohibited in former times, and remains rare even nowadays. Both groups are matrilineal and conform to matrilocal residence practice. Both Cham groups' common ancestor worship is known as kut, characterized in the form of worshiping cemetery steles of dead ancestors. The Cham view the living world matters as just as transient one for a short-term existence, and eternity is the other world where ancestors, dead relatives and deities live.

Another northern group inhabiting around Bình Định and Phú Yên provinces is the Cham Hroi (Haroi), who practice Chamic animism. Under the previous Republic of Vietnam, they were considered a distinct ethnic group. Since 1979, they have been reclassified by the Socialist Republic of Vietnam government as a subgroup of the Cham.

=== Hinduism and Buddhism ===
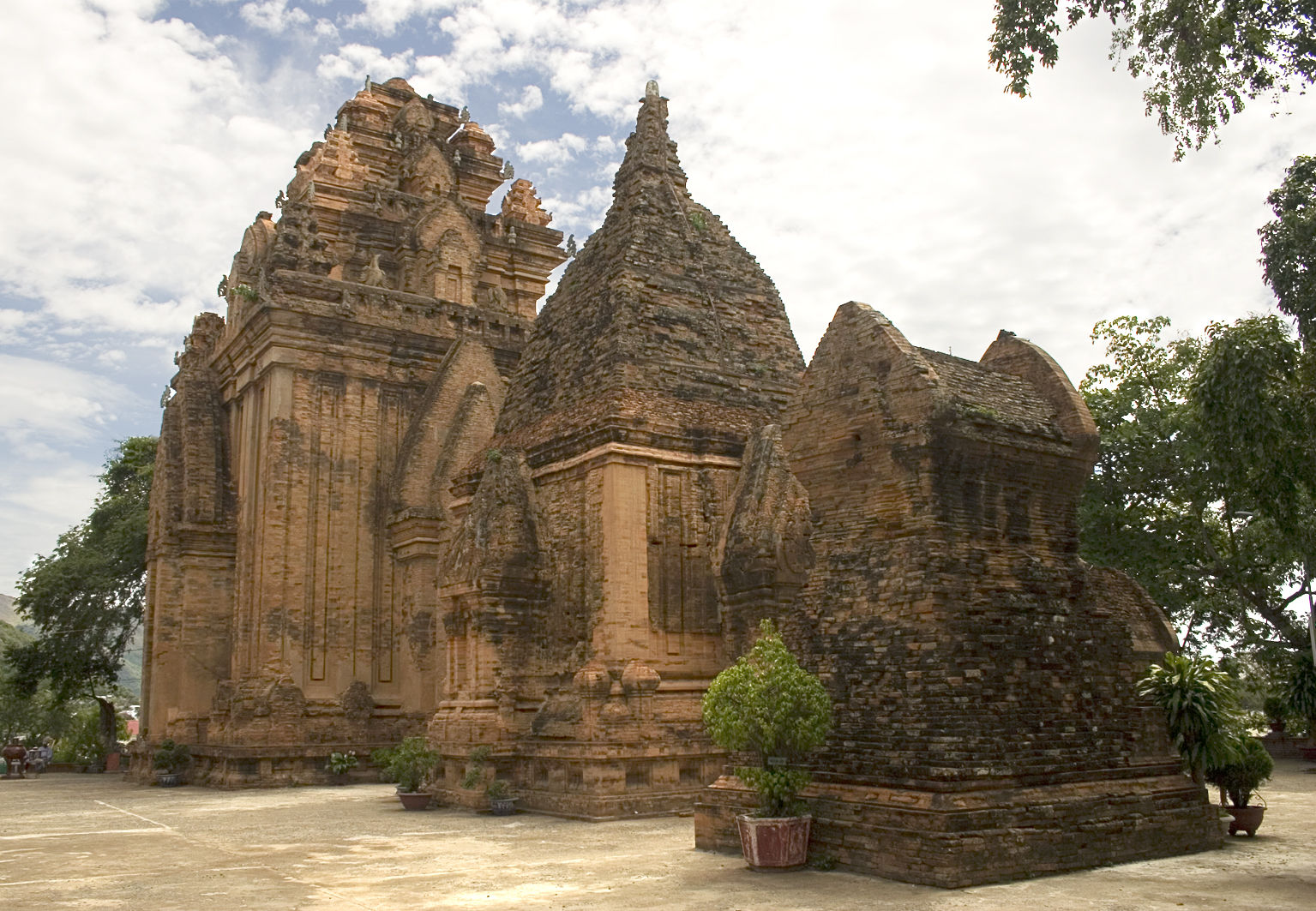
Po Nagar

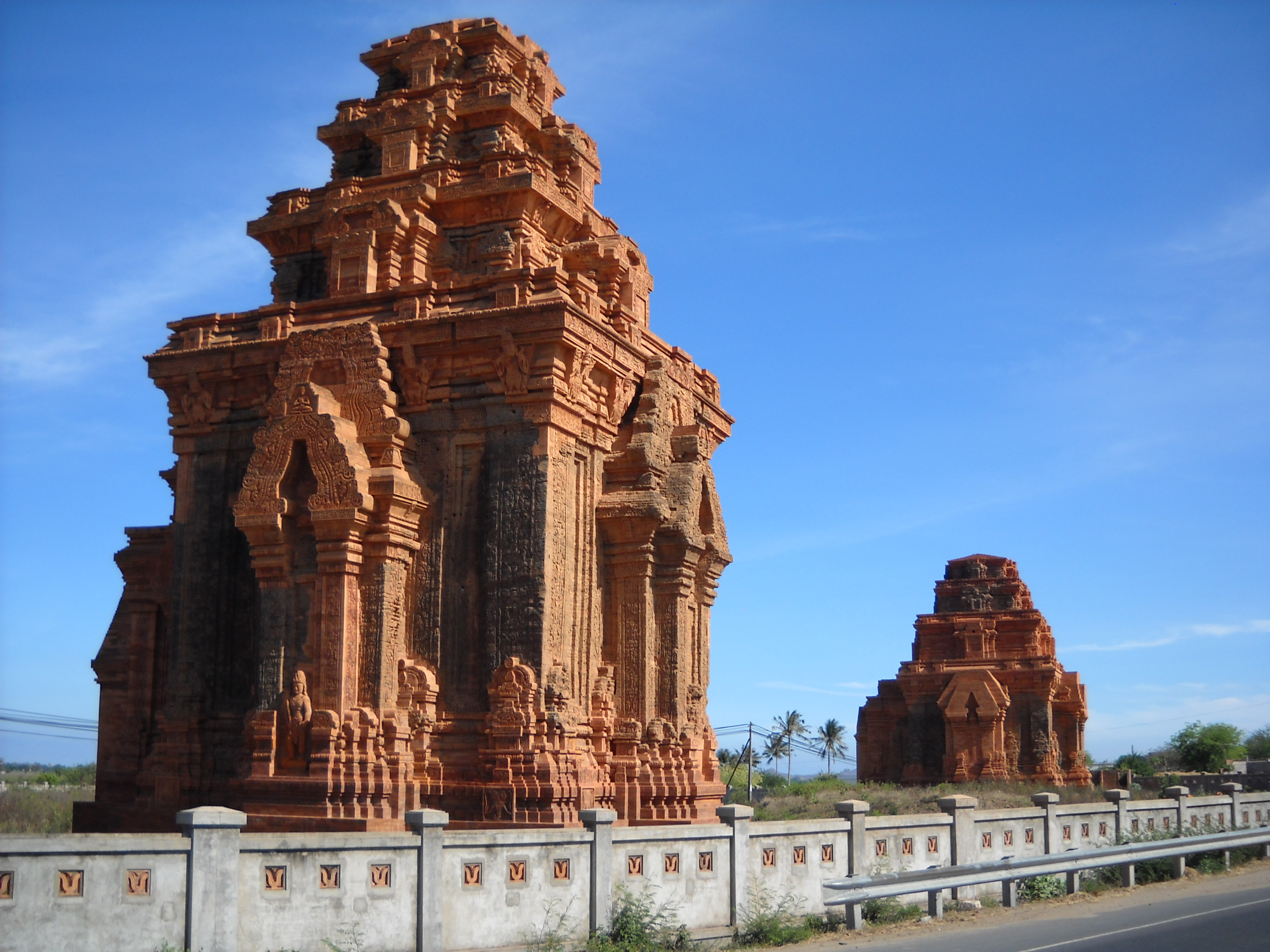
Ninh Thuận

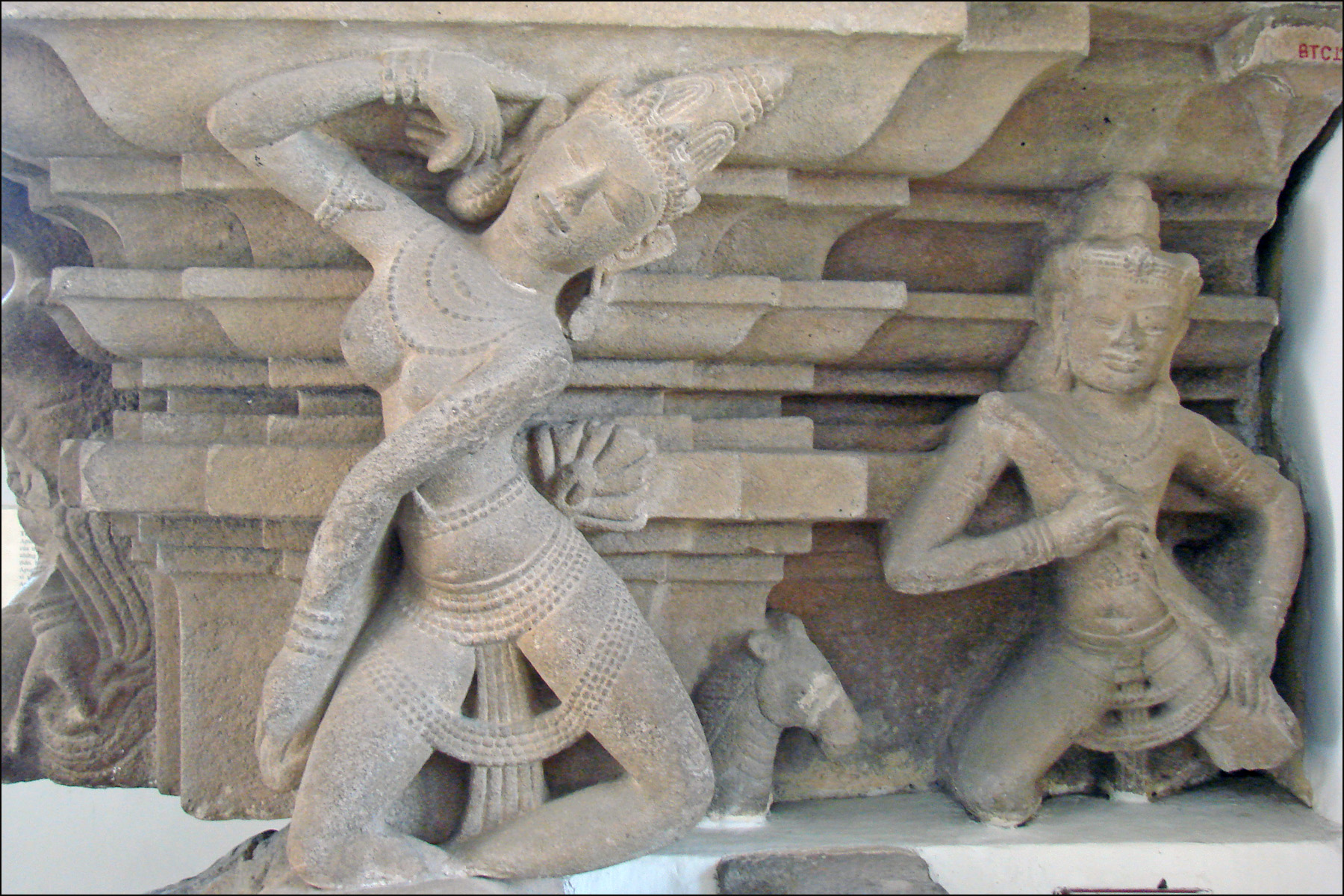
Apsara with Saraswati (right)

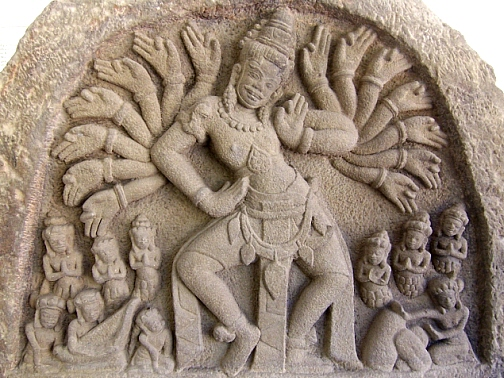
Dancing Siva, c. 10th century AD

Champa art, Hindu temples and statues have been found in many parts of Vietnam.

The term "Balamon" derived from "Brahman" or "Brahmin", one of Hindu caste of religious elite. Balamon Chams adhere to the old religion of their ancestor, an indigenized form of Hinduism that thrived since the ancient era of Kingdom of Champa in the 5th century AD. While today the Bacam (Bacham) are the only surviving Hindus in Vietnam, the region once hosted some of the most exquisite and vibrant Hindu cultures in the world. The entire region of Southeast Asia, in fact, was home to numerous sophisticated Hindu kingdoms. From Angkor in neighbouring Cambodia, to Java and Bali in Indonesia. The Cham Sunni in the Mekong Delta often refer the Balamon as Kafir (Derived from Arabic Kāfir for infidels).

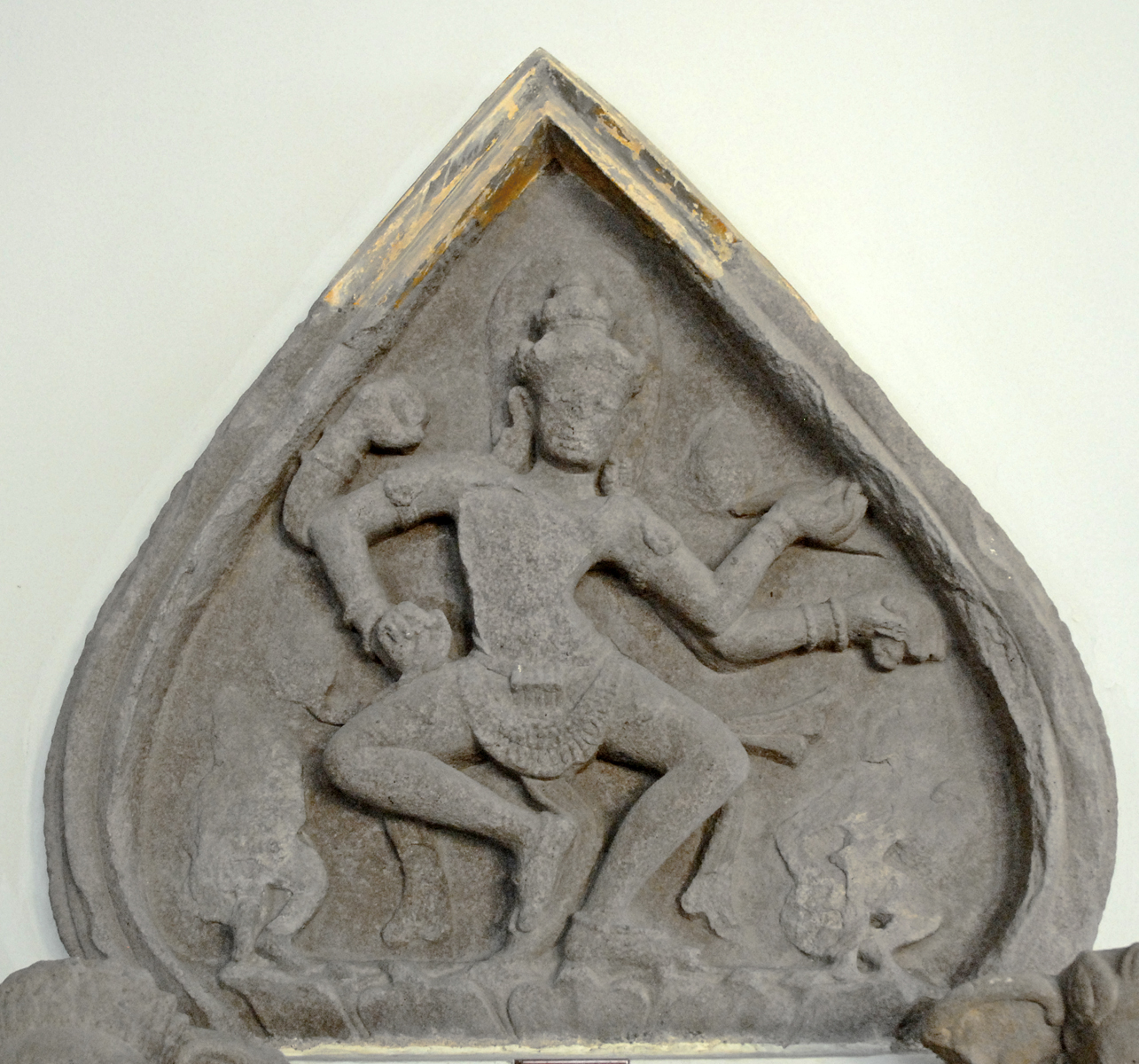
10th-century Cham Saivite relief of Śiva

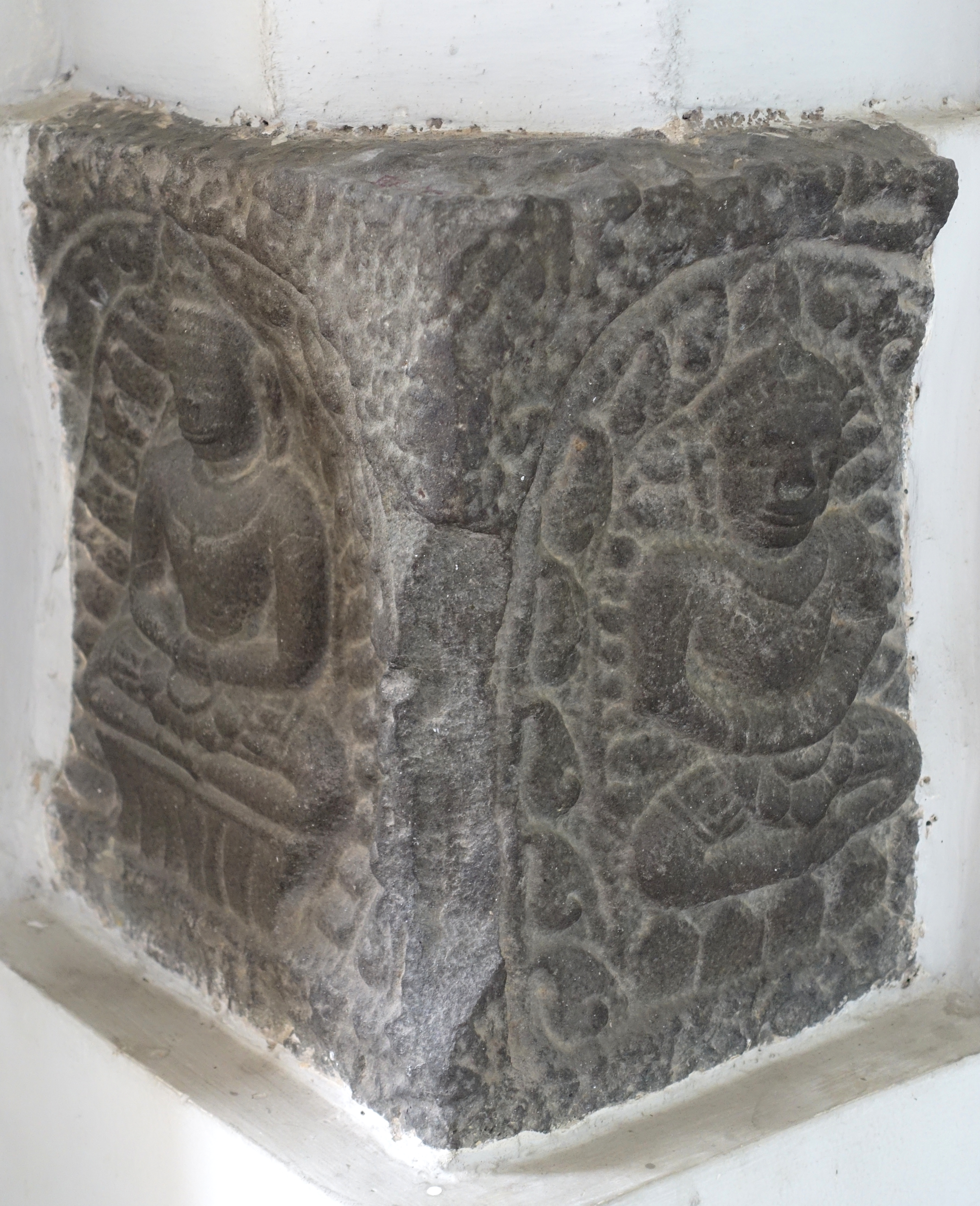
Cham Bodhisattva on a relief cube, c. 12th century

Before the conquest of Champa by the Đại Việt ruler Le Thanh Tong in 1471, the dominant religion of the Cham upper class (Thar patao bamao maâh) was Hinduism, and the culture was heavily influenced by that of India. The commoners generally accepted Hindu influence, but they embedded it with much as possible indigenous Cham beliefs to become parts of the Ahier religion today. The Hinduism of Champa was overwhelmingly Shaiva and it was liberally combined with elements of local religious cults such as the worship of the Earth goddess Lady Po Nagar. The main symbols of Cham Shaivism were the lingam, the mukhalinga, the jaṭāliṅgam, the segmented liṅgam, and the kośa. + A liṅga (or liṅgam) is black stone pillar that serves as a representation of Shiva. Cham kings frequently erected and dedicated stone lingas as the central religious images in royal temples. The name a Cham king would give to such a linga would be a composite of the king's own name and suffix "-iśvara", which stands for Shiva. + A mukhaliṅga is a linga upon which has been painted or carved an image of Shiva as a human being or a human face. + A jaṭāliṅga is a linga upon which has been engraved a stylised representation of Shiva's chignon hairstyle. + A segmented liṅga is a linga post divided into three sections to represent the three aspects of the Hindu godhead or trimurti: the lowest section, square in shape, represents Brahma; the middle section, octagonal in shape, represents Vishnu, and the top section, circular in shape, represents Shiva. + A kośa is a cylindrical basket of precious metal used to cover a linga. The donation of a kośa to the decoration of a liṅga was a distinguishing characteristic of Cham Shaivism. Cham kings gave names to special kośas in much the way that they gave names to the liṅgas themselves.

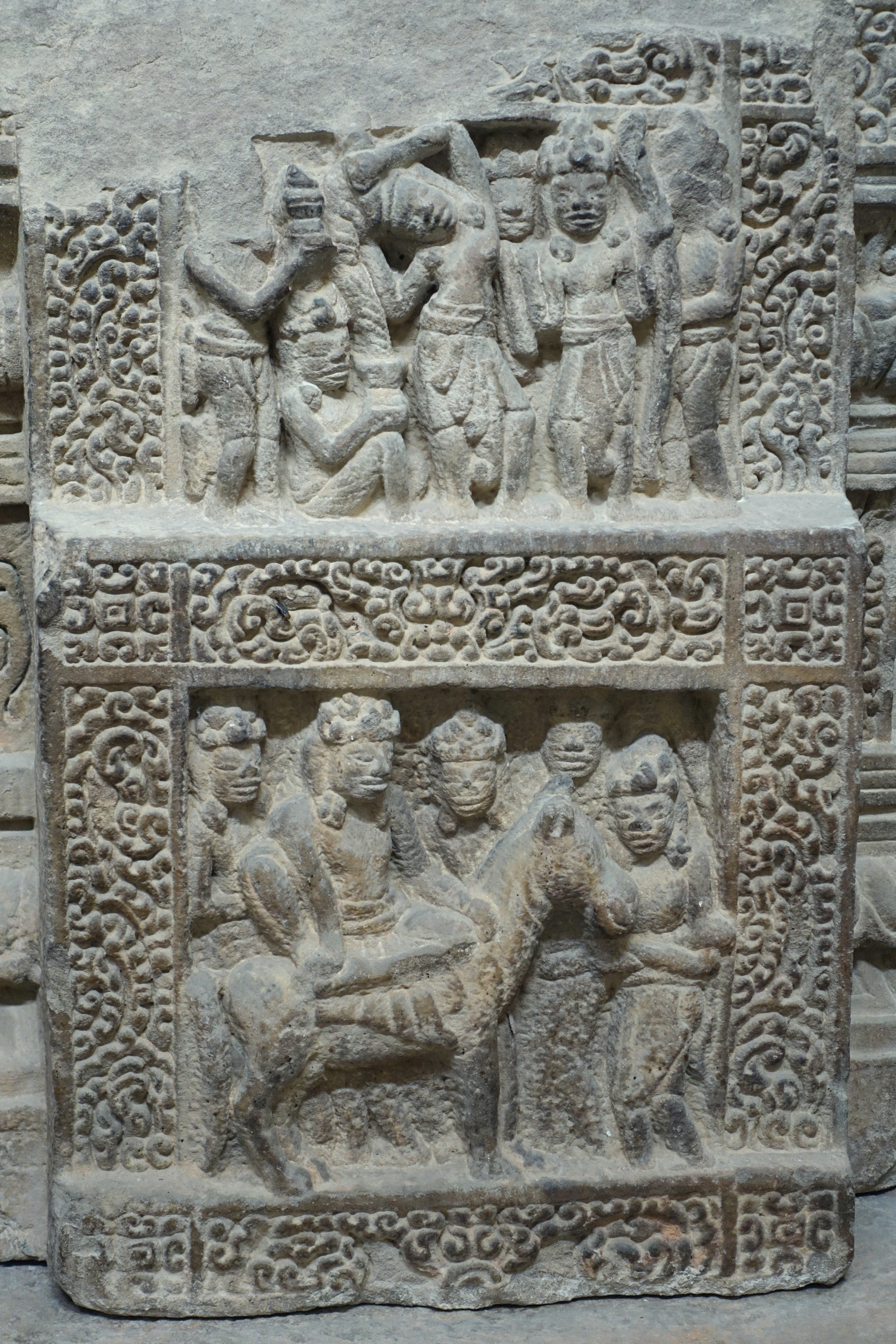
9th-century Dong Duong (Indrapura) lintel describing the early life of Prince Siddhārtha Gautama (who is sitting on a mule).

The predominance of Hinduism in Cham religion was interrupted for a time in the 9th and 10th centuries, when a dynasty at Indrapura (modern Đồng Dương, Quảng Nam Province, Vietnam) adopted Mahayana Buddhism as its faith. King Indravarman II (r. 854–893) built a giant Buddhist monastery, meditation halls, and temples for Champa's monks (Sangha), and celebrated the veneration of the Buddhist deity Lokeśvara under the name Laksmindra Lokeśvara Svabhayada in 875. Mahayana in Champa was blended with observable elements of Tantric Buddhism, manifesting in many traces. For example, Indravarman's successor Jaya Simhavarman I (r. 897–904) according to his verbatim in 902, Vajrapāṇi is the Bodhisattva capable of leading humans into the "path of the Vajra." The Buddhist art of Đồng Dương has received special acclaim for its originality.

Buddhist art of Champa also shared the same unique aesthetics, paralleling with Dvāravatī (Mon) art, highlighting in the similarities of both cultures in their iconographic form of the Buddha-Stūpa-Triad, where the Buddha seats in padmāsana (lotus) flanked by on either side by a depiction of a stūpa. Other shared features are makara lintel, fishtail-shaped sampot illustrating, Gaja-Lakṣmī, pendant-legged Buddhas. The sources of Mon–Cham cultural interaction may be the inland routes between the Muang Fa Daed site on Khorat region, near a lost kingdom called Wèndān by the Chinese (probably the site of Kantarawichai in Kantharawichai, Maha Sarakham), Southern Laos, via Savannakhet, then to Central Vietnam coast through Lao Bảo and Mụ Giạ Passes.

Beginning in the 10th century, Hinduism again became the predominant religion of Champa. Some of the sites that have yielded important works of religious art and architecture from this period are, aside from Mỹ Sơn, Khương Mỹ, Trà Kiệu, Chanh Lo, and Tháp Mắm.

From the 13th to 15th centuries, Mahayana among the Cham was practised in form of syncretic Saivite–Buddhism or the fusion of the worship of Śiva (seen as the protector) and Buddha (seen as the savior). Buddhism prevailed secondary. With the decline of royal power of the ruling Simhavarmanid dynasty in the 15th century and the fall of their capital Vijaya in 1471, all Mahayana or Vajrayana traces of Champa disappeared, enabling space for the rising Islamic faith.

=== Islam ===
Bani Chams or Bani Awal are Cham Muslims in Central Vietnam that converted to a version of localized Shi'a Islam mixed with Hindu-Chamic customs, as the faith started making headway among the population after the 10th century AD. The term "Bani" derived from Arabic term "bani" (بني) which means "people". The popular account mainly from oversea Cham communities assures that the Cham had been converted by either ʿAlī and his son Muḥammad ibn al-Ḥanafīyya. Al-Dimashqi claimed a story that the Alīds after being expelled, a small group of them took refugee in Champa; these Muslim immigrants therefore spread Shi'a among the Cham, which perhaps eventually led to the synthesis of the Bani Awal religion. In their devotions, the Cham Bani refer to Adam and Eve, the archangel Gabriel, Abraham, the prophet Muhammad, ʿAlī, Fāṭima, Ḥasan and Ḥusayn. They have religious organization dominated by a class of dignitaries who always wear white tunics, the pious colour of Islam, Quranic books with Cham commentaries, and simple mosques. However their Imams bear Cham-Sanskrit titles gru and acar. By the 17th century, the royal families of Champa had converted to Bani Islam. The Ahiér is particularly more than strange as they adhere to a hypersyncretic Islam-Balamon-Cham religion. Ahier, meaning later, implies that the Cham Ahier were people who converted to Islam in the 16th to 17th centuries, after the Bani Awal. Ahier and Bani Awal communities have blended Shi'a Islam, Balamon, with their own customs to the point that sectarian distinction no longer makes sense. For example, Allah is usually written as Po Uvalvah, and prophet Muhammad, which the Cham Bani refer as Po Rasulak was morphed into one of many important Cham deities. Most Cham are now evenly split between being followers of Islam and Hinduism, with the majority of Central Vietnam Cham being Ahier and Bani, while the majority of Cambodian Chams and Mekong Delta Chams are Sunni Muslim (also called Cham Baruw, meaning "new Cham"), though significant minorities of Mahayana Buddhists continue to exist.

Historical documents regarded that 18th-century Cham and Malay Sunni settlements in the Mekong Delta established by the Nguyen lords earlier than Vietnamese settlements in order to establish Viet-controlled settlements for frontier defense. The embodiment of more fundamentalist Sunni faiths in the Mekong Delta and Cambodia gave the Cham communities here socio-cultural inclinations toward the wider Malay/Islamic world compared with the fairly isolated Cham Bani in Central Vietnam. Islam also instigated certain ethno-religious values to the Mekong Delta Cham, which help them preserve and retain their distinct ethnic identity in a dynamic transnational environment.

Kelantanese Muslim preachers or imams sailed to Champa shores not long after the fall of Vijaya to teach their school among the local community, academic ties there were also established leading to long-lasting exchange of teachers between both regions over the centuries; certain placenames in Kelantan like Pengkalan Chepa (lit. 'Champa Landing') reflect this fact. Indonesian 15th-century records indicate that Princess Daravati, of Cham origin, converted to Islam, and influenced her husband, Kertawijaya, Majapahit's seventh ruler to convert the Majapahit royal family to Islam. The Islamic tomb of Putri Champa (Princess of Champa) can be found in Trowulan, East Java, the site of the Majapahit imperial capital. In the 15th to 17th century, Islamic Champa had maintained a cordial relationship with the Aceh Sultanate through dynastic marriage. This sultanate was located on the northern tip of Sumatra and was an active promoter of the Islamic faith in the Indonesian archipelago.

The lunisolar Cham Sawaki calendar is an amalgamation of the Islamic and traditional Cham calendars, which was based on the Indian Śaka era. A normal year in Sawaki consists of 354 days with 12 months; the average length of each month is either 29 or 30 days. The calendar has a 12-year cycle of zodiac called Nâthak. It sets three leap years for every eight years, compared to 11 leap years for every 30 years of the orthodox Islamic calendar.

== Economy ==
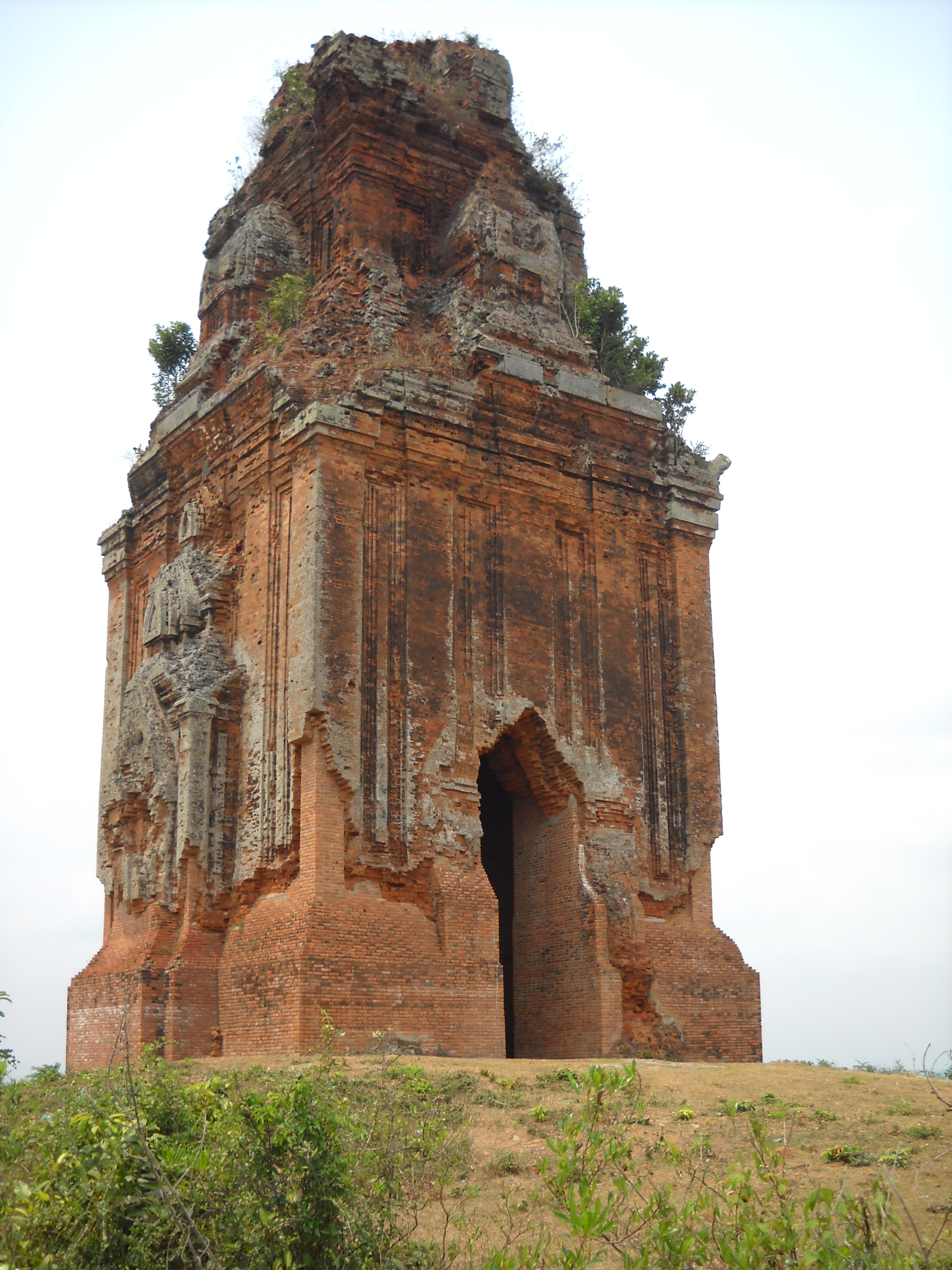
Phu Loc tower, a Cham kalan archetype, Binh Dinh, constructed in the late 13th century. A remain of Vijaya.

Unlike many contemporaneous mainland Southeast Asian kingdoms, Champa's economy was not a heavily agrarian one. The 14th-century Franciscan traveller Odoric of Pordenone who had visited the nation in 1324–25 describes the diet of medieval Champa commoners mainly composed of rice and fish/seafood products. As a seafaring people, the Cham were highly itinerant and established a network of trade including not only the major ports at Hội An, Thị Nại but also extending into the mountainous hinterland. Maritime trade was facilitated by a network of wells that provided fresh water to Cham and foreign ships along the coast of Champa and the islands of Cù Lao Chàm and Lý Sơn. While Kenneth R. Hall suggests that Champa was not able to rely on taxes on trade for stable revenue, but instead financed their rule by raiding neighboring countries and seabustering merchant ships, Hardy argues that the country's prosperity was above all based on commerce.

The vast majority of Champa's export products, mostly medieval commodities, came from the mountainous hinterland, sourced from as far as Attapeu in southern Laos. They included gold and silver, slaves, animal and animal products, and precious woods. Cham pottery, characterized by distinct olive-green and brown glazes, were primary produced by the kilns of Gò Sành, just in the suburbs of Vijaya. Cham ceramic production peaked around the 14th to 16th century, and have been reported to be discovered in present-day Egypt, the UAE, Malaysia, and the Philippines.

By far the most important export product was eaglewood. It was the only product mentioned in Marco Polo's brief account and similarly impressed the Arab trader Sulayman several centuries earlier. Most of it was probably taken from the Aquilaria crassna tree, just as most of the eaglewood in Vietnam today. The largest amount of eaglewood products extracted from the highland of Champa occurred in 1155, when Cham envoy reportedly shipped 55,020 catties (around 33 tons) of incense of Wuli to the Song court as trade tribute.

=== Cham port-cities ===
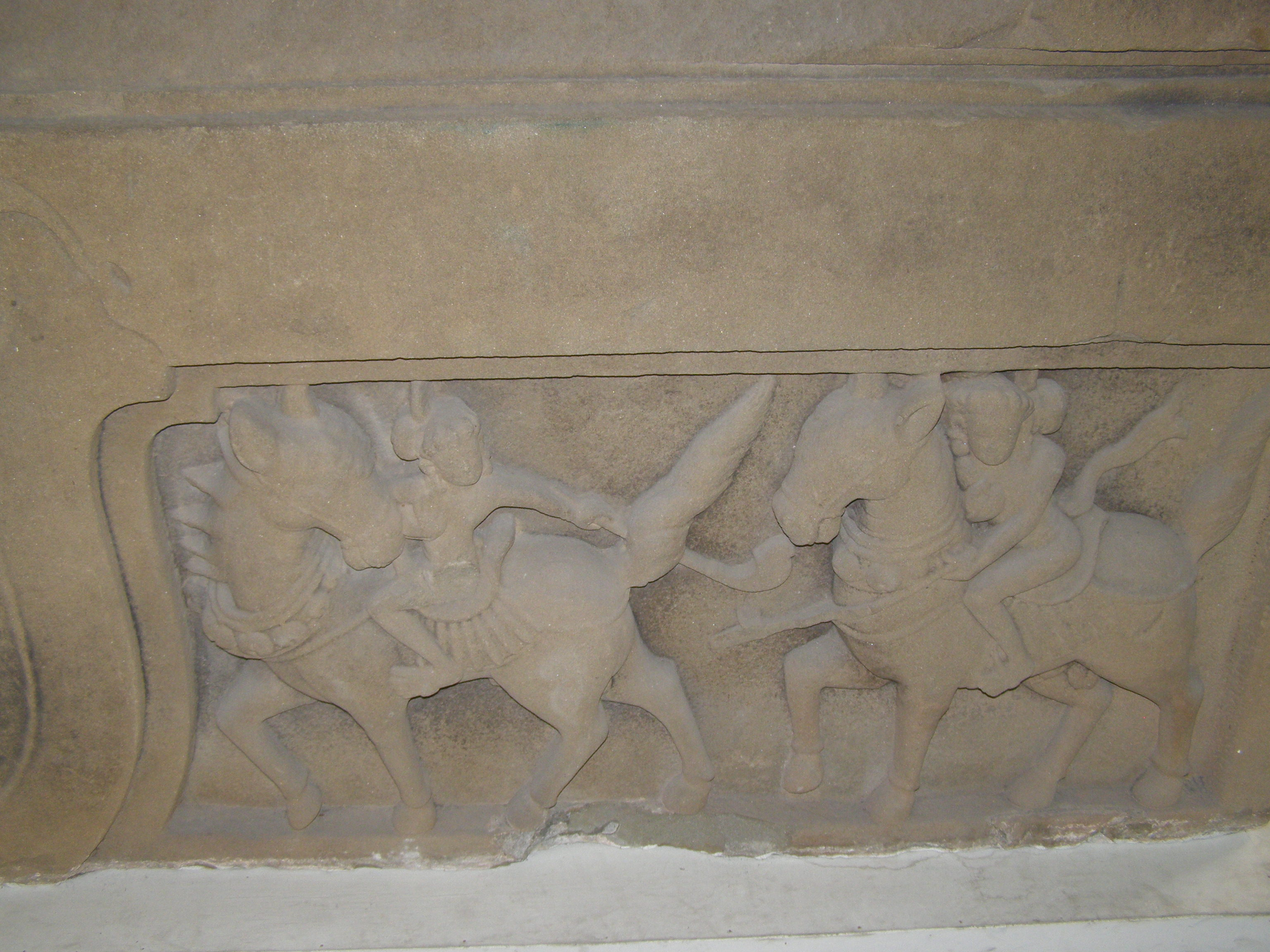
Two Cham women playing Polo. c. 600–900.

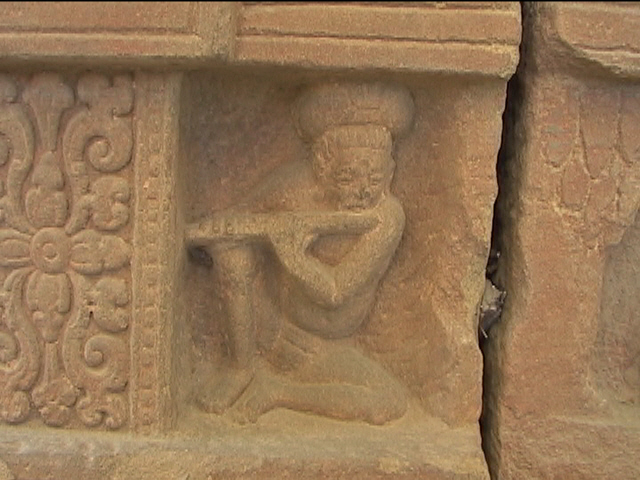
Cham man playing flute. c. 600–750.

During the medieval age, the Champa Kingdom benefited greatly from the luxurious maritime trade routes through the South China Sea and overland trade networks connecting Angkor and Bagan to Champa. Urbanization in Champa took place progressively from the 1st to 8th centuries, from the late Sahuynhian to the early Champa period. Champa concentrated its wealth in highly urbanized port-cities, some of them located in self-governing regions. The earliest of those was Simhapura, emerged as a riverine port-city and Cham political centre around AD 400. Prominent examples include Amarendrapura (Lai Trung, Huế) and Visnupura (Nhan Bieu, Quảng Trị) in the north; Indrapura, Amaravati (Quang Nam) and Vijaya (Cha Ban, Bình Định) in the central region; and Nha Trang, Virapura (near Phan Rang), and Panduranga in the south. These cosmopolitan cities were loaded with surplus amount of trading goods and exotic products, overcrowded by merchants not just from other Cham states, but also Chinese, Khmer, Malay, Viet, Arab, and Indian traders and travelers.

The Zhu Fan Zhi describes the port cities of Champa, 'on the arrival of a trading ship in this country, officials are sent on board with a book made of folded slips of black leather.' After an inventory has been taken, the cargo may be landed. 20% of the goods carried on is claimed as tax, and the rest may be traded privately. If they discovered that 'any items were hidden away during the customs check, the whole cargo will be confiscated.'

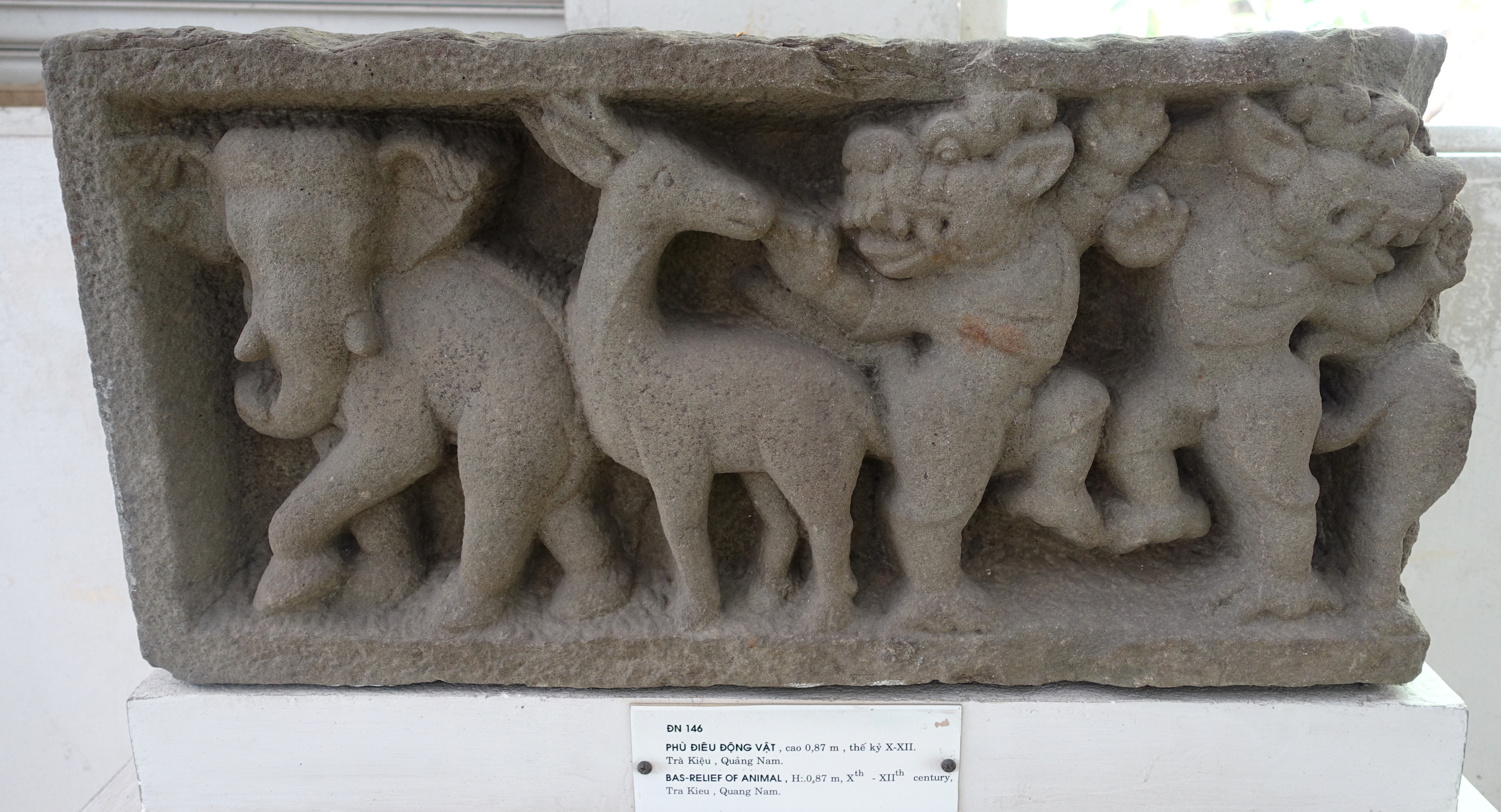
Bas relief of animals and beasties from Tra Kieu, c. 900–1100. Museum of Cham Sculpture.

When French scholars arrived in the mid-19th century, they were impressed with Cham ruins, Cham urbanism, and medieval networks throughout the former kingdom. The middle-age densely populated areas of Tra Kieu and My Son were well connected by paved stone roads, bridges, urban ruins that were 16 feet high, rampart and stone citadel in a rectangle shape of 984 feet by 1640 feet, which hosted temples, fortified palaces, and resident structures, and were supplied by canals, irrigation projects, underground aqueducts and wells.

From the 4th to 15th century, these cities were relatively wealthy. Foreign traders and travelers from across medieval Eurasia were well-aware of Champa's richness and eyewitnessed the crowded, prosperous Cham port-cities. Abu'l-Faradj described the city of Indrapura "this temple is ancient that all the Buddhas found there enter into conversation with the faithful and reply to all the requests made to them." Columbus during his fourth voyage in 1502 along the coast of Central America, in accordance with contemporary knowledge that confused Central America with eastern Asia, thought that he had reached the kingdom of "Ciampa" visited by Marco Polo in 1290. Peter Martyr d'Anghiera recorded in De Orbe Novo Decades that on his fourth voyage in 1502, Columbus: "found a vast territory called Quiriquetana [ Quiriguá] in the language of the inhabitants, but he called it Ciamba (Champa)". Portuguese travelers in the early 16th century, such as Fernão Mendes Pinto, reported vestiges of these cities "a town of above ten thousand households" which "encircled by a strong wall of brick, towers, and bulwarks." Because of this, Champa was the target of multiple warring powers surrounding: the Chinese in 4th century-605; the Javanese in 774 and 787, the Vietnamese in 982, 1044, 1069, 1073, 1446, and 1471; the Khmer in 945–950, 1074, 1126–1128, 1139–1150, 1190–1220; and the Mongol Yuan in 1283–85, many cities were ransacked by invaders and rebuilt or repaired over time. They also had to face constant threats from hazards per annum such as flood, tropical cyclones, fire. Some Cham port-cities later ended up captured by Vietnamese in the mid-15th century, which later resulted in the rise of Nguyễn domain depending on these port-cities, whom benefited international trades, and was well-balanced enough to fend off several northern Trịnh invasions in the 17th century.

== Role of women ==
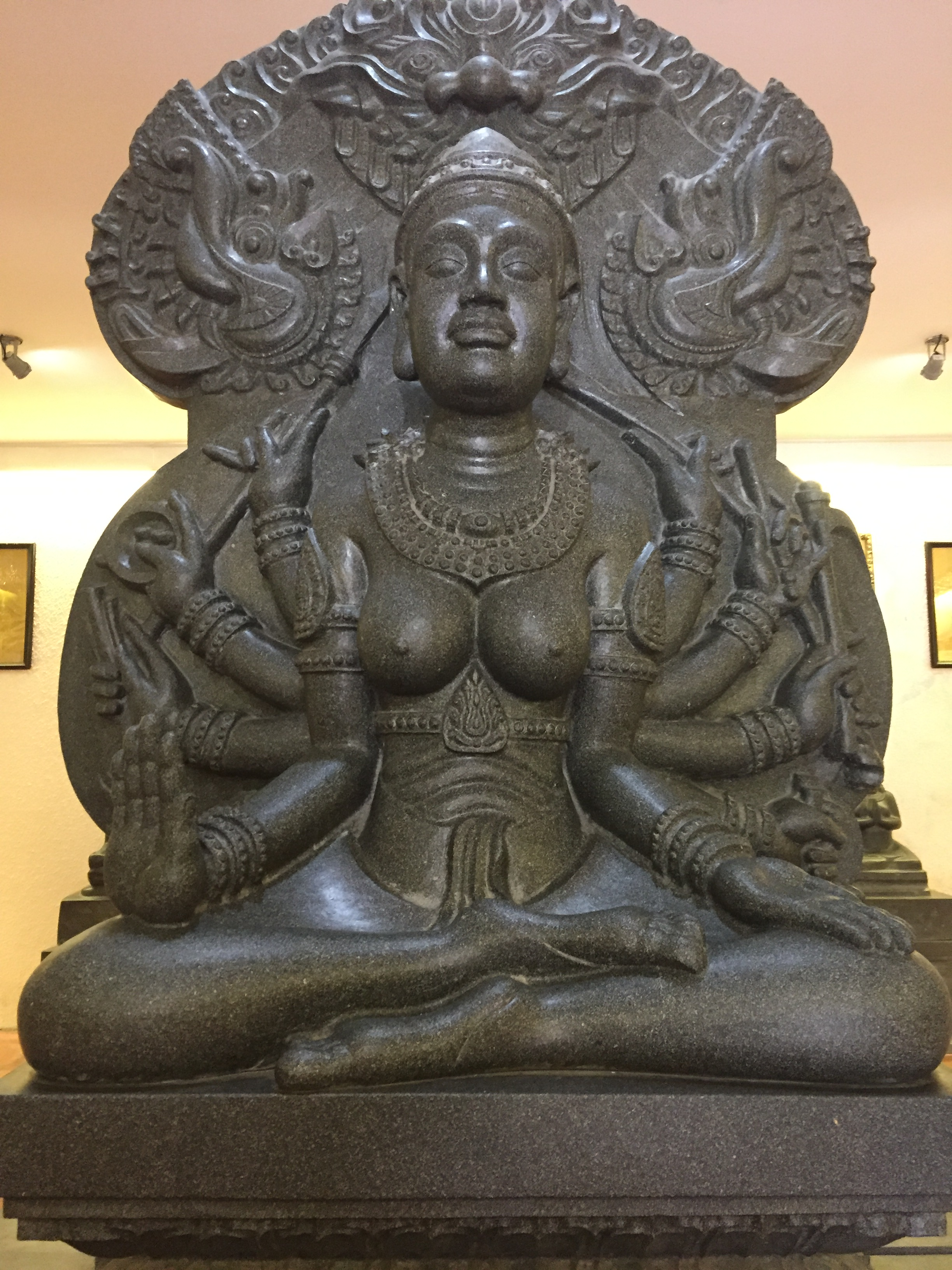
Statue of Lady Po Nagar

Women enjoy far greater freedom and important role in Cham history and society compared to neighboring and Islamic cultures generally. Prior 1975, Cham communities in Central Vietnam, Bani Muslim and Ahier, still upheld the practice of matrilineality in family relationship. Bani priests symbolize women while Ahier priests represent for male. Yoshimoto suggests the Bani Awal-Ahier binary indicates the notion of symbolic dualism between male and female, husband and wife. Women take major roles in every aspects of Cham society. Neither a gender hierarchy and restriction exists. Religious attendance at thang magik (Bani mosque) during the Ramawan month are mostly accomplished by women from every household.

The 4th century Vo Canh inscription denotes the existence of matrilineage of early Cham rulers. Another prominent example of Cham matrilinealism in royal succession was King Rudravarman I of the Gangaraja dynasty. Rudravarman was the son of Manorathavarman's niece.

Female gods constitute the majority of divinities in Cham historical legends. The most sacred Goddess of the Cham people is Lady Po Nagar, a mythical princess who was said to be the founder of Champa. Po Dava, the Cham God of Virginity, is the symbol of learning and literature. She is worshipped at the Po Nagar Hamu Tanran temple in Panduranga.

According to the legend of Po Klong Garai, Princess Po Sah Inö was the mother of Po Klong Garai. She was born of sea foam scrubbings. When she grew up, she drank water from a spring, and magically got pregnant. In one day, her scabby son encountered a dragon who then healed him and predicted that he should become king. The boy, Po Klong Garai, then acquired supernatural powers. The chief of royal astronomy ought to ask Po Klong Garai to marry his daughter. Po Klong Garai then became king, destroying the Cambodian invaders, bringing peace and prosperity to the Kingdom of Champa. To commemorate the legendary hero, in 1242 the future King Jaya Simhavarman III (r. 1288–1307) offered the construction of the Po Klong Garai Temple at Phan Rang.

== Archaeological remains ==
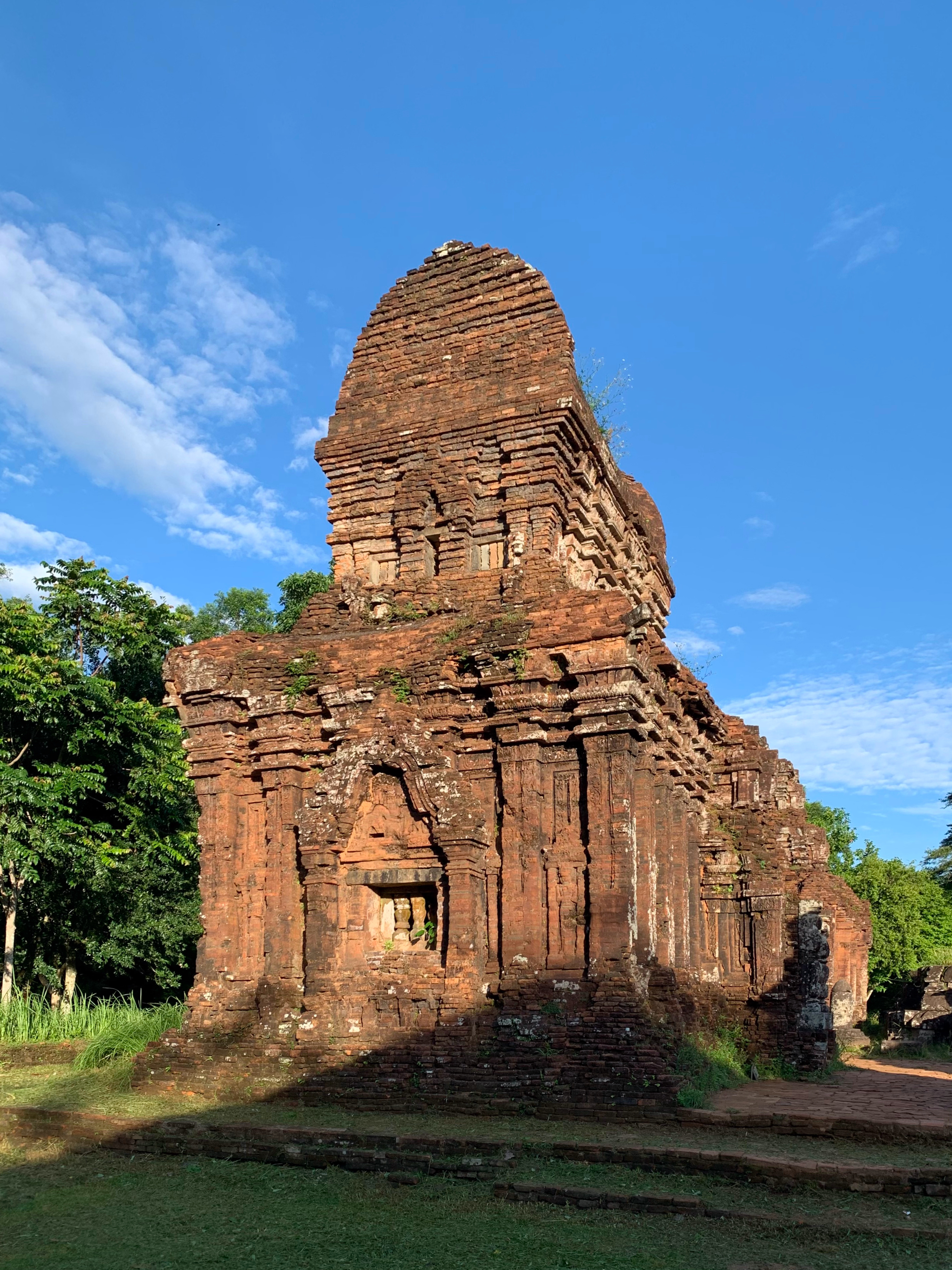
Mỹ Sơn is the site of the largest collection of Cham ruins.

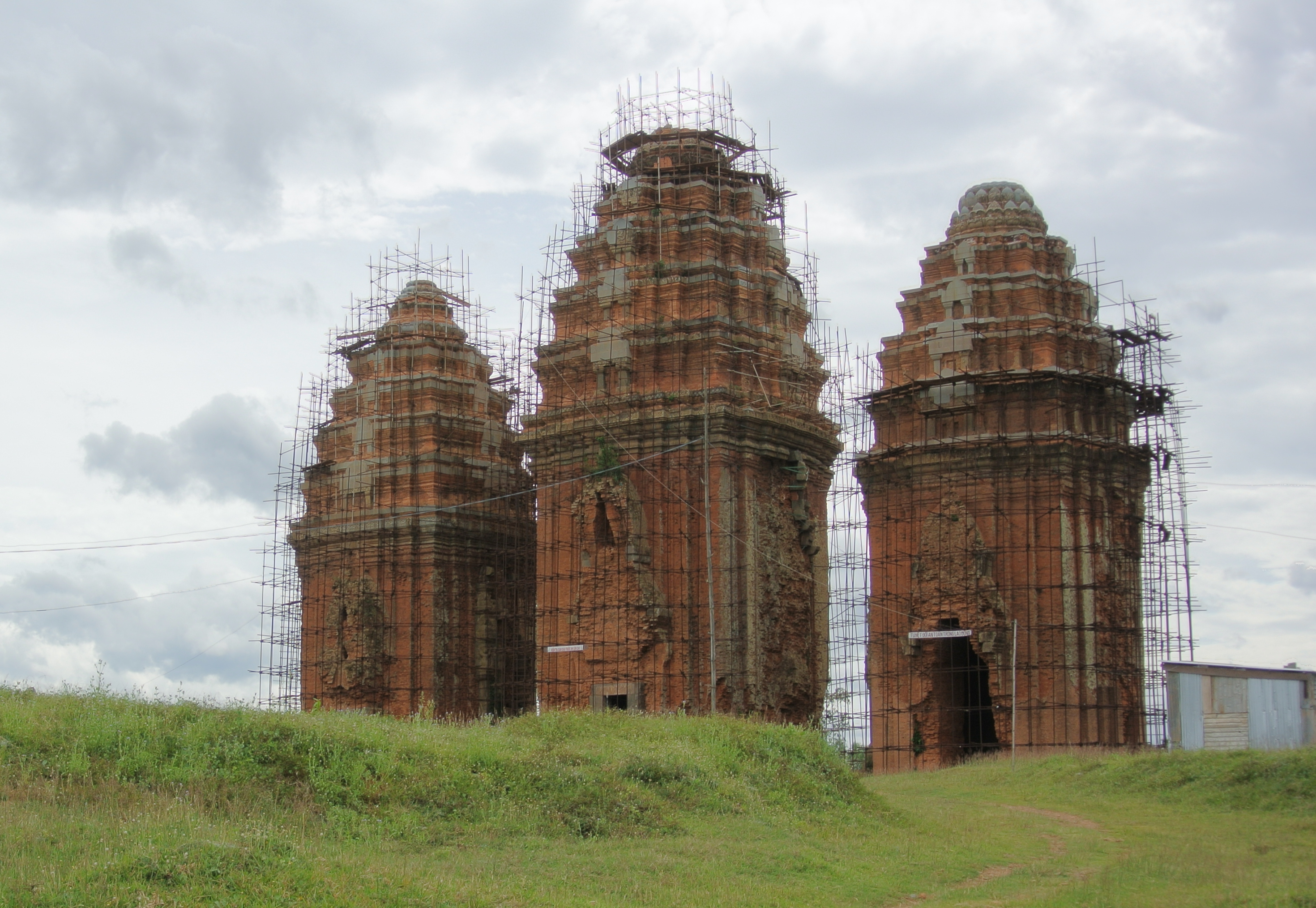
39 meters (128 ft) tall brick tower (the tallest one) and two shorter 33-meters (108 ft) and 32-meters (105 ft) towers of Dương Long in Bình Định province.

=== Religious ===
- Mỹ Sơn near the town of Hội An on the Thu Bồn River. Established by Bhadravarman I in the 5th century AD, Vikrantavarman I initiated a major building program in the 7th century. Construction continued until 1157 under Jaya Harivarman I.
- Po Nagar in Kauthara, on a harbour, comprising six temples and a pillared hall. Established before the 7th century AD, a wooden structure was burned in AD 774 by Javanese raiders. Prithindravarman initiated major construction in 757. One tower dates from 813 and construction continued until 1256.
- Đồng Dương/Indrapura was founded by Indravarman II in 875. Most of the complex was destroyed during the Vietnam War. The site consists of three large courts, a large assembly hall, and a main temple sanctuary. Two bronze statues, one of Buddha and one of Avalokiteśvara were found at the site.
- Po Klaung Garai in Panduranga (Phan Rang).
- Chanh Lo Temple in Châu Sa, Quảng Ngãi, dating 11th century.
- Vrddha Ratnapura in Đại Hữu, Quảng Bình. Flourished during the 9th-10th centuries, including Mahayana shrines and metal images of Avalokiteśvara.
- Temple of King Po Rome, the latest Cham monument, built in the 17th century.
- Po Sah Inu in Hamu Lithit (Phan Thiết).
- Thap Doi Towers.
- Banh It Temple.
- Duong Long Towers.
- Yang Prong Tower, Đắk Lắk.
- Ruins of Hải Lăng Temple, Quảng Trị province.
- Phú Diên Tower, Huế, 8th century CE (discovered 2001, intact).
- Ruins of Bang Keng Temple, Krong Pa district, Gia Lai province, 7th–8th century (discovered in 2006).
- Ruins of Próh Temple, Đơn Dương district, Lâm Đồng province, 12th–13th centuries (discovered in 1978).
- Ruins of Wat Phu, Champasak province in Laos. Khmer-Hindu buildings with Champa influences.

=== Fortresses and cities ===
- Khu Túc (known in Chinese sources as Qusu) located along the Kiến Giang River of Quảng Bình province, was built in the 4th century AD and includes a revetted wall and moat as do the other centers. Khu Túc was sacked by the Chinese in 446 AD, "all inhabitants over the age of 15 were put to the sword" and as much as 48,000 of gold taken.
- Trà Bàn (Caban) was the capital of Vijaya. Ruins included Canh Tien towers, located north of Quy Nhon and contains a possible royal palace.
- Châu Sa or Amaravati in Quảng Ngãi province.
- Trà Kiệu or Simhapura, dating from the last two to three centuries BC until the 6th or 7th centuries AD.
- Thành Hồ (Ayaru) is located on the northern bank of the Đà Rằng River, Phú Yên.
- Song Luy (Bal Cattinon) is located on the coast south of Cape Dinh, Bình Thuận province.
- Samriddhipuri (nowadays An Khe) is located in Gia Lai Province, Central Highlands.

Some of the network of wells that was used to provide fresh water to Cham and foreign ships still remains. Cham wells are recognisable by their square shape. They are still in use and provide fresh water even during times of drought.

=== Museums ===
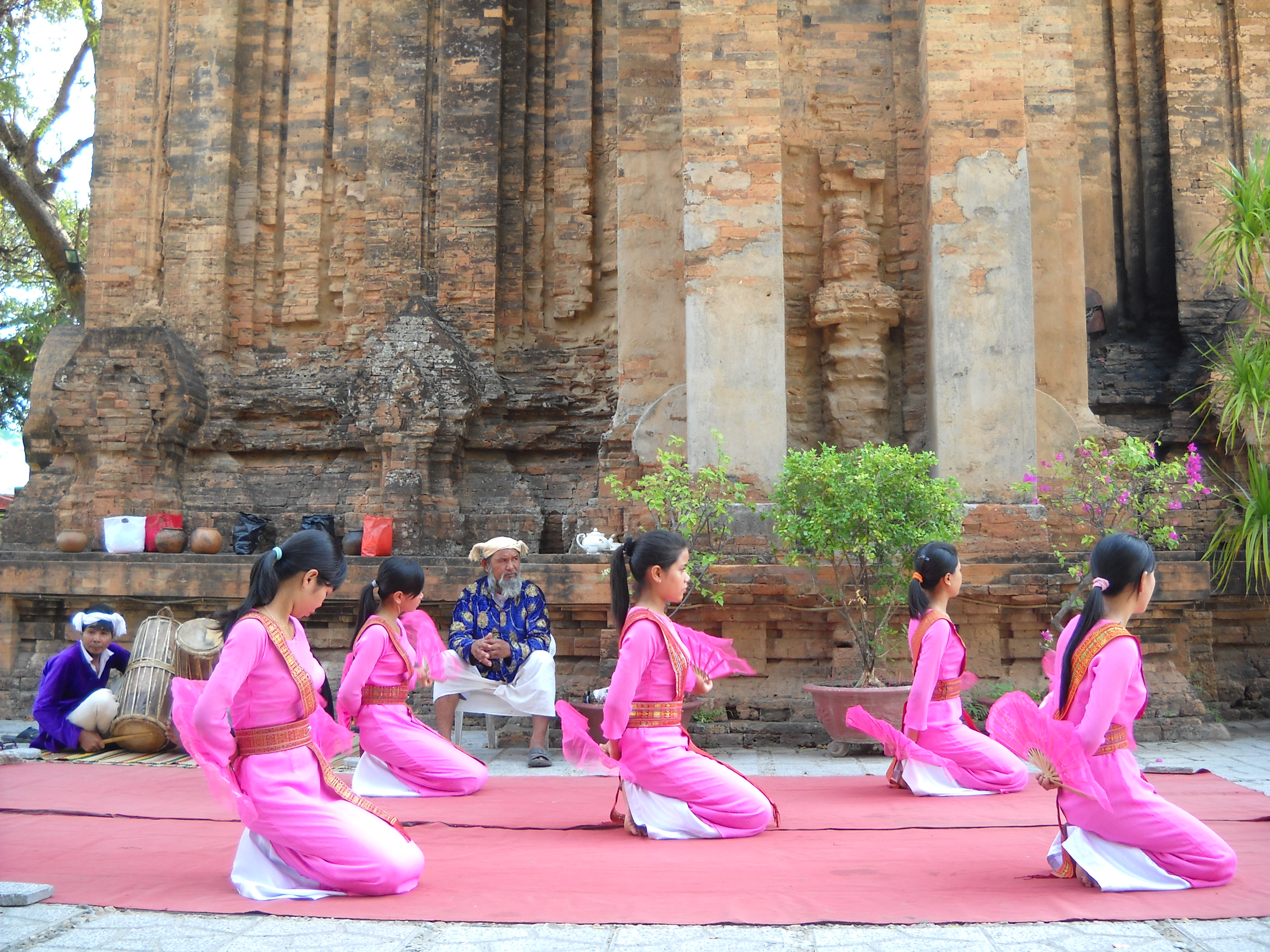
Champa ladies dance at Poklong Garai stupa in Phan Rang

The largest collection of Cham sculpture may be found in the Da Nang Museum of Cham Sculpture (formerly known as "Musée Henri Parmentier") in the coastal city of Da Nang. The museum was established in 1915 by French scholars, and is regarded as one of the most beautiful in Southeast Asia. Many Cham sculptures and valuable artifacts were destroyed during the Vietnam War due to bombing, others were either illegally looted or smuggled by private collectors, most famously Douglas Latchford, whose collections are now under investigation by the US Justice Department. Other museums with collections of Cham art include the following:

- Museum of Fine Arts, Hanoi
- Museum of History, Hanoi
- Museum of Fine Arts, Saigon
- Museum of History, Saigon
- Musée Guimet, Paris
- Museum of Fine Arts, Boston
- Metropolitan Museum of Art, New York City
- Asian Art Museum (San Francisco)
- Los Angeles County Museum of Art
- Denver Museum of Art
- Cleveland Museum of Art, Ohio
- British Museum
- National Gallery of Australia
- Rietberg Museum, Zürich, Switzerland

== Cham influences on Vietnamese culture ==
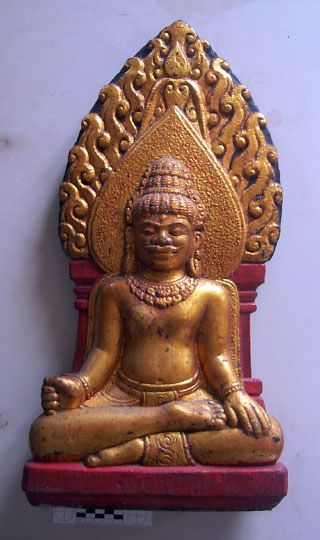
A Vietnamese Shiva figure made by sandstone in Vong La Temple, Hanoi, dated 12th century

Throughout history, Champa and the Cham were viewed by premodern Vietnamese literati and upper-class aristocrats as barbaric, uncivilized, and often described in disgusting senses, with several Vietnamese rulers pushed assimilationist policies and attempts to eradicate the Cham culture rather than incorporating it into Vietnamese.

Despite that, according to modern Vietnamese historians, although Champa was absorbed, the Vietnamese were influenced by it. In 1044, after raiding Champa, Vietnamese emperor Lý Thái Tông took some 5,000 prisoners, and brought back to Đại Việt a number of court dancers familiar with Indian-style dances, settling to them in a palace specifically built for them. Both Lý Thái Tông and his son Lý Thánh Tông had a great appreciation for Cham music, and in 1060 Lý Thái Tông ordered his court musicians to study the Cham drum rhythms along with Cham songs he himself had translated into Vietnamese. According to some Vietnamese scholars, the Vietnamese cult of Princess Liễu Hạnh might have been influenced by Cham deity Yang Pu Inu Nagara (Lady Po Nagar).

Even the Vietnamese Quan họ music and Lục bát (six-eight) poetry could have been influenced by Cham poetry and folk music.

Cham art also spread far across the Red River Delta, where many Vietnamese Buddhist temples hosted Cham-style statues of dragons, lions, nāgá, makara, kinnari, Brahma and Hamsa dated back to the 11th–13th century (however, since these creatures also existed in China, it was more likely Chinese influence and not Champa). Thousand of bricks inscribed with Cham script indicate that a multitude of Vietnamese temples and holy sites were built by Cham engineers. A Buddhist stone stupa of Dạm tempe in Bắc Ninh Province, built by Vietnamese emperor Lý Nhân Tông in 1086, is a representation of a lingam and its yoni (a Hindu-Cham symbol of fertility and the power of creation).

In 1693, after lord Nguyễn Phúc Chu's take over of Panduranga, the Cham were forced to wear regulated Vietnamese attire, at least the members of the ruling Mâh Taha dynasty, Cham king Po Saktiraydapatih, and Cham court officials.

== Legacy ==
It is important to understand that without the Chams and the former kingdom of Champa, Vietnam would probably never have existed. The country not only built itself by incorporating Champa territories and populations, but has also been receptive to a variety of its cultural and religious influences. Indeed, over the centuries, Chams have woven dense networks not just within Vietnam, but all over Southeast Asia. Without the Chams and Champa, this part of the world would look very different.

— Nicolas Weber, "The Cham Diaspora in Southeast Asia", p. 158

According to French researcher and ethnologist Denys Lombard, "Champa is not only the name of a former kingdom but it is also of a vast network that extended all over the main Southeast Asian centers". For nearly 1,500 years, the Cham and their diaspora communities had developed and maintained a vast and complex overland and maritime system of networks, not just around modern-day Vietnam, but also extended throughout Mainland and Maritime Southeast Asia. These networks, served not only for trade, but also for connecting peoples, transporting culture, ideas, and religious identities across the region, enduring endless historical possibilities and mutual relationships, significantly helping most of Southeast Asia to transform into their present-day.

Cham culture influenced nearby communities and tamed most of present-day Vietnam and surrounding areas. Despite being formed from one of the least coherent places on Earth, Champa was a formidable seafaring kingdom that outlasted most empires. The Cham today, one of the few microcosms in Southeast Asia that still maintain strong links with neighboring countries in the region while still retaining their distinct ethnic identity.

Modern Vietnamese perceptions of Champa and its legacy are varying. (Note: Pre-1975 South Vietnamese/RVN intellectuals were quite aware and but satisfying with Vietnamese colonization and destruction of Champa. Most Viet nationalist writers entangled Champa with the ethnocentric Nam tien narrative, at the same time racism was constructed to rationalize and justify the dark subjugation, colonization, and genocide over the indigenous peoples, and the (South) Vietnamese identity. Vastly contrasting to North Vietnam/DRV, where Marxist authors in the 1950s criticized all Viet ruler after 1471 for their oppressive rule over the Cham while sympathetic for a multiethnic Vietnamese nation, but their views drastically changed in the 1960s and 70s during the height and end of the Vietnam War. Later DRV and SVN (Socialist Republic of Vietnam) authors, while pushing for a monolithic Vietnamese nation-state narrative, deliberately altered or misinterpreted historical events in favor of the VCP's stultifying narrative, and so state historians have actively decontextualized and downplayed Cham heritages and the Vietnamese conquest of Champa. After DRV's 1971 publication, Cham and indigenous history were virtually disenfranchised from official Vietnamese historiography, and the Cham and indigenous peoples are perceived by Hanoi authors as merely insignificant outsiders that offer no matter in official Vietnamese history but considered as peripherical, supplemental parts of the deeply-internalized ethnocentric Kinh history, neither being told from the Cham and indigenous peoples' own perspectives. The Doi moi period (post-1986) sees significant resurgences of nationalist and ethnocentric sentiments in Vietnamese scholarship. Overtime, most authors and the general Vietnamese historiography got extremely low thresholds, great unconscious biases and intolerance for enduring any discomfort associated with discussions on the historic Vietnamese conquest and repressions of Vietnam's indigenous peoples. The French revisionist academics in the late 1980s also attempted to "rescue" the neglected Champa and indigenous history from the Vietnamese nationalist nation-state narrative.(Lockhart 2011)(Lockhart 2011, p. 28)) Today, the Cham are seen as one minority group within the unnoticeable multi-ethnic Vietnam, and their legacy is incorporated into the Vietnamese national heritage.

== See also ==
- King of Champa
- Art of Champa
- History of Vietnam
- Kampong Cham Province in east Cambodia
- Kingdom of Champasak in the south of Laos
- Champa independence movement
