= National Treasure (Vietnam) =

Cultural heritages and objects significant to Vietnam

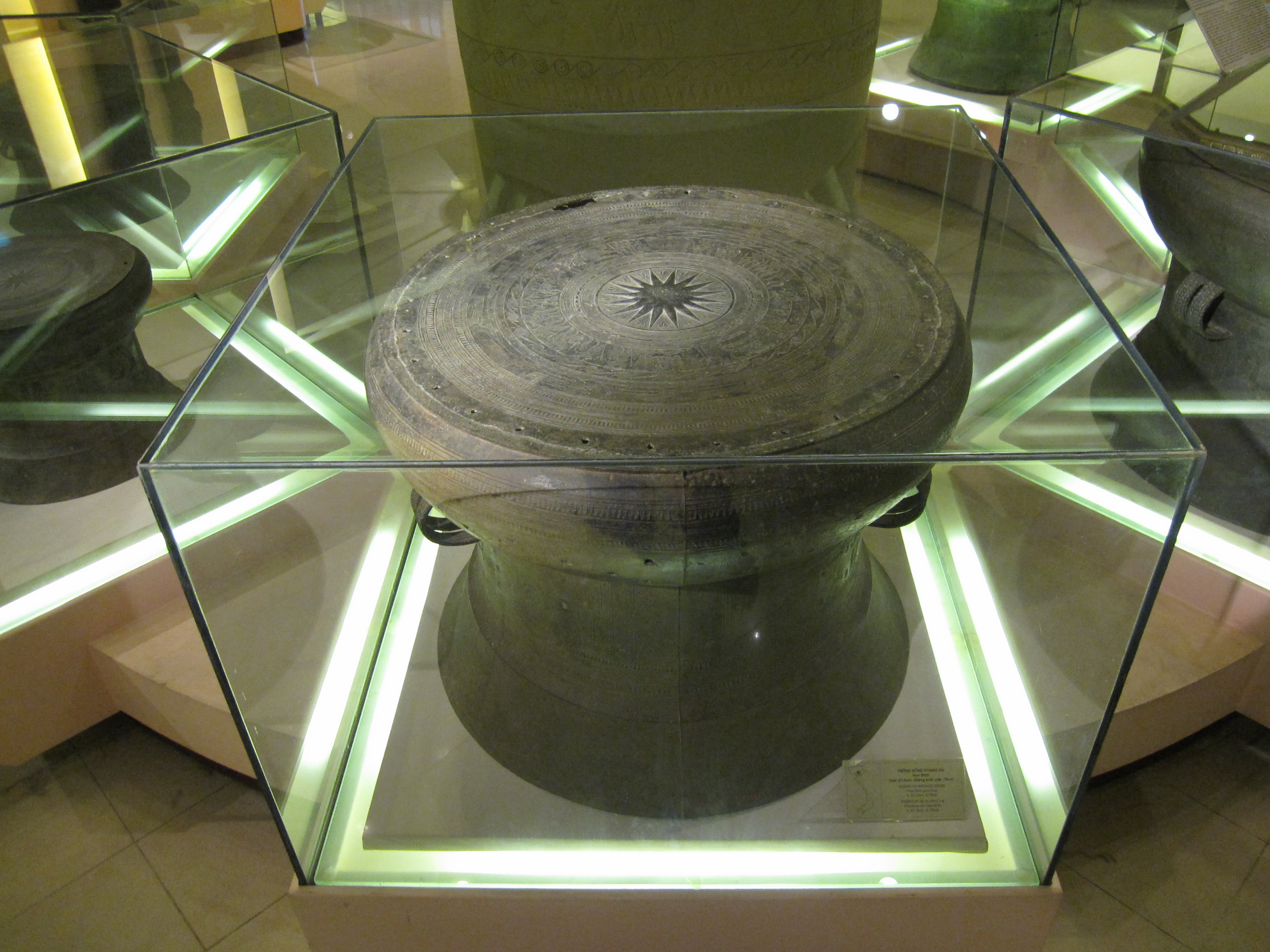
Hoang Ha bronze drum of Đông Sơn Culture (national treasure no. 2 – set 1)

A National Treasure (Vietnamese: Bảo vật quốc gia) or a national precious object is a tangible cultural heritage or object handed down from the past with historical, cultural or scientific value of exceptional significance to the country of Vietnam. National treasures are deemed to be protected and preserved according to a special scheme by the Vietnamese Government. The government also earmark an adequate proportion of the State budget to purchase national treasure as well as investment in activities of protecting and promoting the values of these objects. The title national treasure is recognised by a decision from the Vietnamese Prime Minister after obtaining evaluation opinions of the National Council for Cultural Heritages.

== History ==
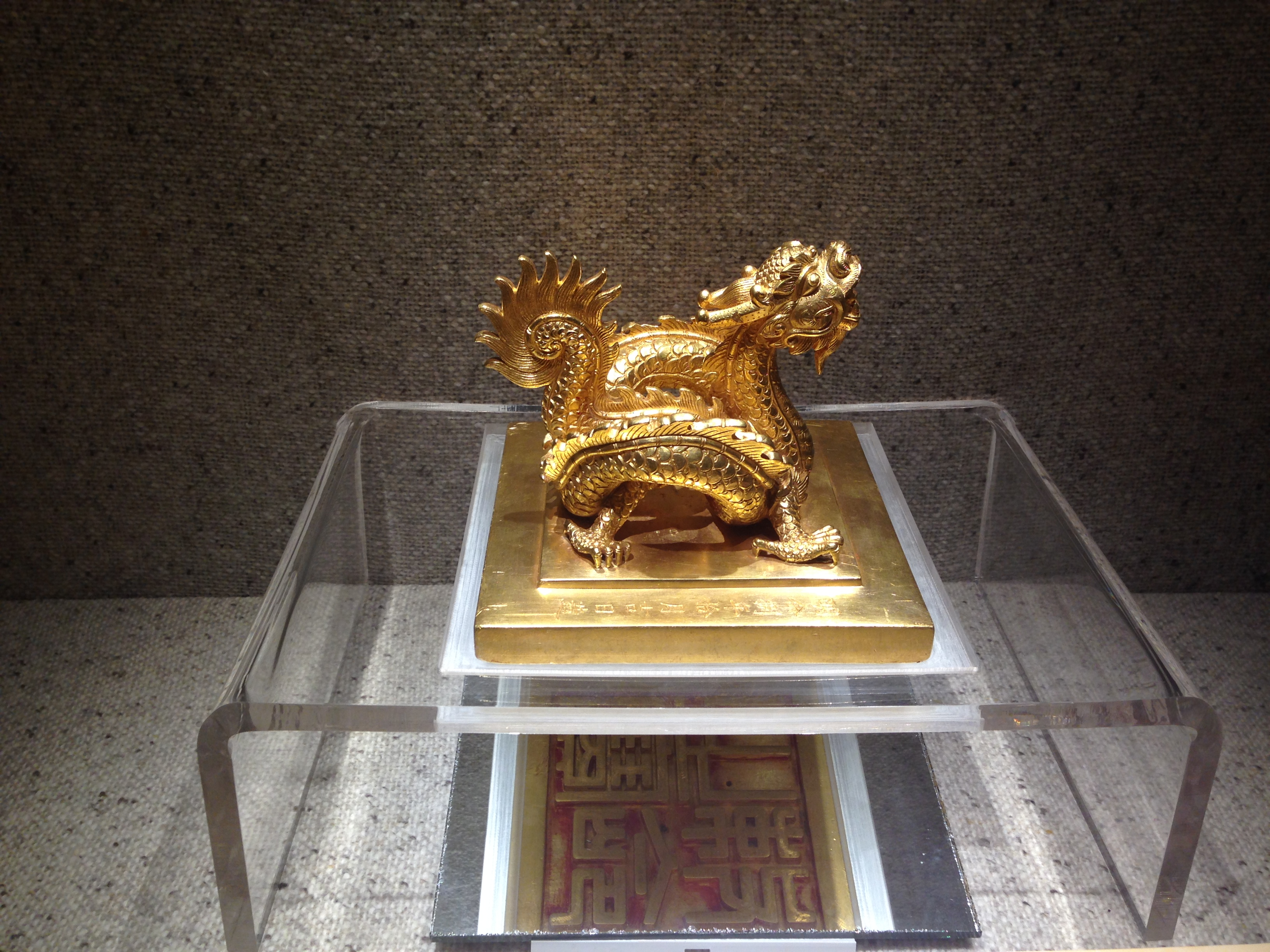
The golden seal Sắc mệnh chi bảo (敕命之寶) of Nguyen Emperors (national treasure no. 23 – set 4)

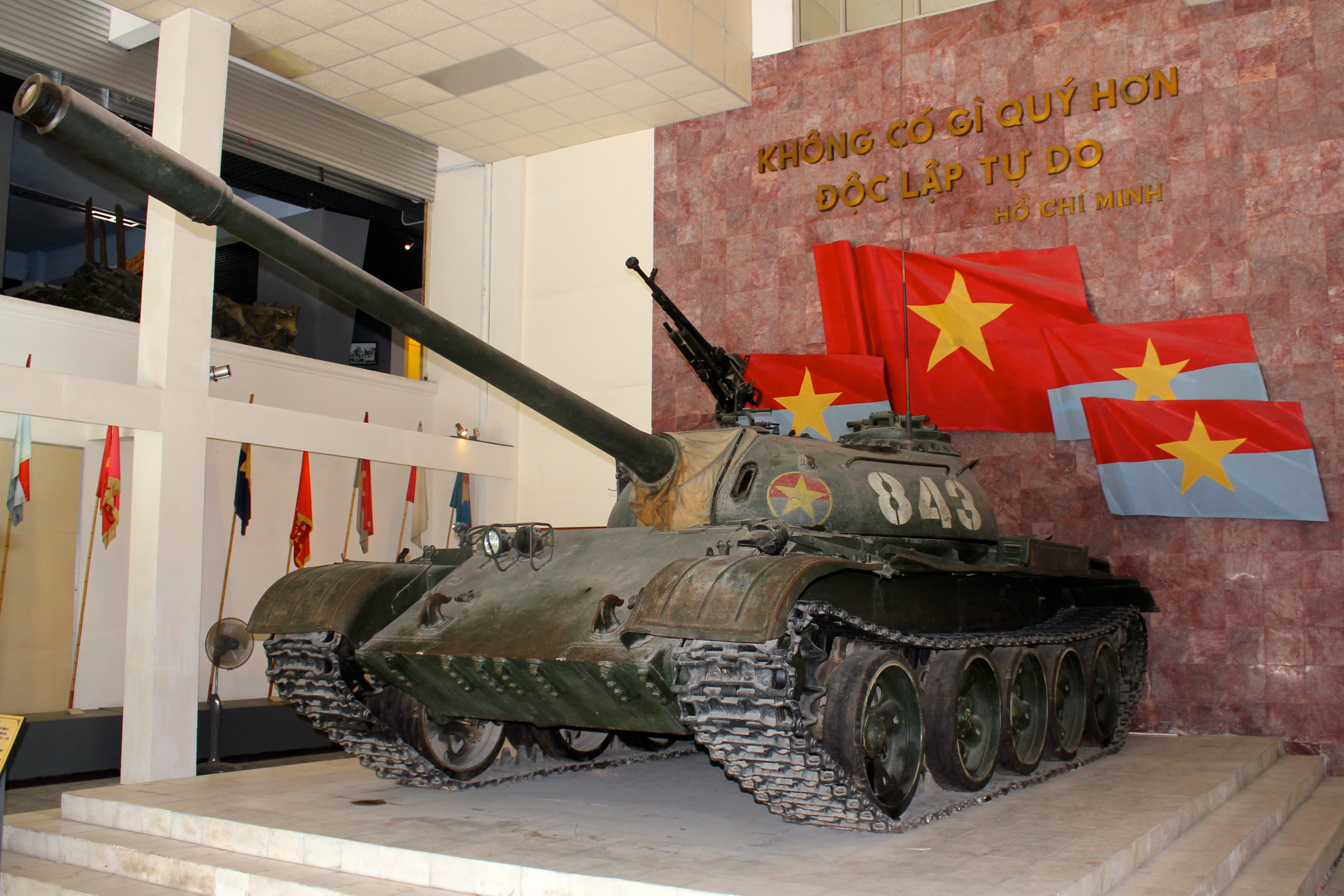
The T-54B tank no. 843 (national treasure no. 28 – set 1) that ended Vietnam War by bursting through the gate of the Independence Palace on 30 April 1975

The term national treasure was first mentioned in various articles of the first Law on Cultural Heritage passed by the National Assembly of Vietnam on 29 June 2001. However, there was not a clear definition or a set of criteria for determining a national treasure. In 2009, the Amendment of Law on Cultural Heritage Act presented a separate article specifically for the subject "national treasure". According to the Law, a national treasure of Vietnam have to meet all these requirements:

- "Being the unique original object;
- "Being an object with a special form;
- "Being an object of special value related to a great national event or to the career of a national hero or typical personality; or being a famous artistic work of ideological, humane or aesthetic value typical of a trend, style or era; or being a typical invented or created product of high practical value with the effect of promoting social development in a certain historical period; or being a natural specimen evidencing different formation and development periods of the earth's history and nature's history."

— National Assembly of Vietnam, Law amending and supplementing a number of articles of the law on cultural heritages (2009), Article 41a

The Minister of Culture, Sports and Tourism specified the order of and procedures for recognising a national treasure, then the decision of granting the title national treasure comes from the Prime Minister of Vietnam with the consultation of National Council for Cultural Heritages. The first set of national treasure is officially designated in October 2012. Up until 2024, 12 sets of national treasures (294 artifacts) had been designated in a series of decrees signed by the Deputy Prime Minister of Vietnam on behalf of Prime Minister. The different combination of treasures into sets only depends on the chronological order of nominations submitted by owners of the treasures, not related to the category or value of the treasures themselves. The quantities and designation dates of Vietnamese national treasures are:

- Set 1 (signed on 1 October 2012) 30 national treasures
- Set 2 (signed on 30 December 2013) 37 national treasures
- Set 3 (signed on 14 January 2015) 12 national treasures
- Set 4 (signed on 23 December 2015) 25 national treasures
- Set 5 (signed on 22 December 2016) 14 national treasures
- Set 6 (signed on 25 December 2017) 24 national treasures
- Set 7 (signed on 24 December 2018) 22 national treasures
- Set 8 (signed on 15 January 2020) 27 national treasures
- Set 9 (signed on 31 December 2020) 24 national treasures
- Set 10 (signed on 25 December 2021) 23 national treasures
- Set 11 (signed on 30 January 2023) 27 national treasures
- Set 12 (signed on 18 January 2024) 29 national treasures

== Regulations ==
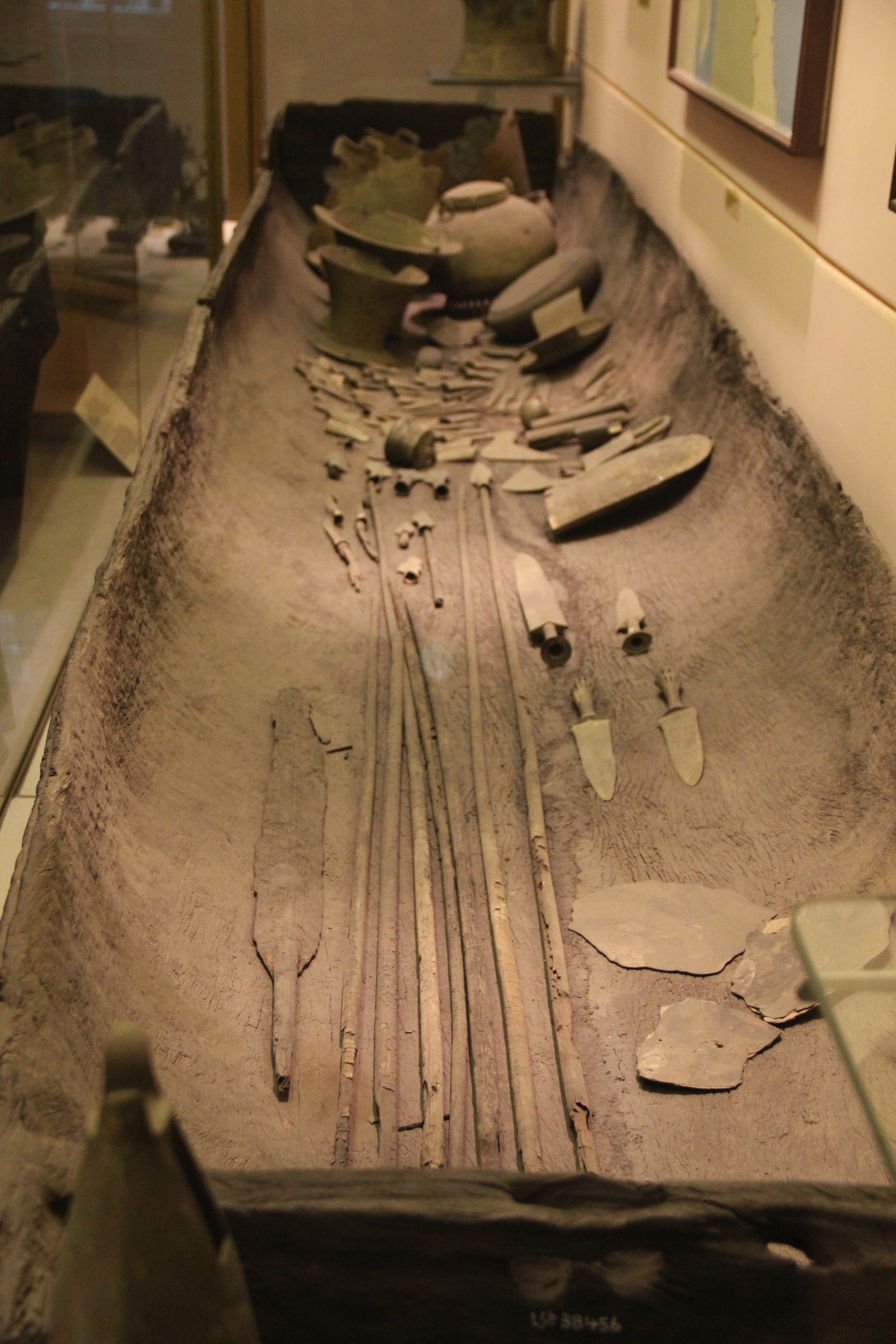
Bronze funerary artifacts found in boat grave of Viet Khe (national treasure no. 3 – set 2). The complete burial ensemble is one of few national treasures has been exhibited abroad for the first time, in Germany

There are strict regulations related to obligation of the Vietnamese State and owners of national treasure regarding ownership, protection and exhibition abroad. National treasures shall be registered with competent state agencies in charge of culture. Government agencies which have information on registered national treasures must kept confidential at owner's request, provide with professional guidance on, and create conditions for protecting and promoting the values of treasures. When transferring the ownership of national treasures, their owners shall notify competent government agencies of new owners of these objects within 15 days after the transfer.

In 2016, under Decision No. 23/2016/QD-TTg, issued by the Prime Minister of Vietnam, items formally designated as national treasures can only be transported abroad under one of these circumstances:

- "To serve state-level diplomatic activities of the Party General Secretary, the President, the Prime Minister and the National Assembly Chairperson.
- "To promote the history, culture, land and people of Vietnam under special international cooperation programs.
- "To implement international cooperation plans on research and preservation of national treasures."

Transport of the treasures abroad for display, exhibition, research or preservation must adhere to article 44 of the Law on Cultural Heritage, which requires the following conditions:

- "Getting insured by recipients of vestiges, antiques and national precious object
- "Obtaining the Prime Minister's decisions permitting the bringing of national treasure abroad; or the Culture Minister's decisions permitting the bringing of vestiges and antiques abroad."

== List ==
=== Set 1 ===
The first set of 30 national treasure was designated on 1 October 2012 by Decision No. 1426/QD-TTg signed by Deputy Prime Minister Nguyen Thien Nhan.

No.	Name	Date/Period/Culture	Owner	Location	Photo
1	Ngọc Lũ bronze drum	c. 2500–2000 Before Present (Đông Sơn culture)	Vietnam National Museum of History	Hanoi	
2	Hoàng Hạ bronze drum	c. 2500–2000 Before Present (Đông Sơn culture)	Vietnam National Museum of History	Hanoi	
3	Đào Thịnh bronze jar	c. 2500–2000 Before Present (Đông Sơn culture)	Vietnam National Museum of History	Hanoi	
4	The bronze statue of a piggybacking and panpipe-playing couple	c. 2500–2000 BP (Đông Sơn culture)	Vietnam National Museum of History	Hanoi	
5	The bronze lampbase shaped as a kneeling man	c. 2000–1700 BP (Đông Sơn culture)	Vietnam National Museum of History	Hanoi	
6	Cảnh Thịnh bronze drum	1800 (Tây Sơn dynasty)	Vietnam National Museum of History	Hanoi	
7	Official bronze seal Môn Hạ Sảnh ấn	1377 (Trần dynasty)	Vietnam National Museum of History	Hanoi	
8	Blue and white ceramic vase with swan patterns	15th century (Lê dynasty)	Vietnam National Museum of History	Hanoi	
9	Revolutionary Road (book)	1927; Work of Ho Chi Minh	Vietnam National Museum of History	Hanoi	
10	Prison Diary (book)	1942–1943; Work of Ho Chi Minh	Vietnam National Museum of History	Hanoi	
11	A draft of the Call on the whole nation to carry out the resistance war	1946; Handwritten draft of Ho Chi Minh	Vietnam National Museum of History	Hanoi	
12	A draft of the Call on fellow citizens and soldier of whole nation	17 July 1966; Handwritten draft of Ho Chi Minh's speech on the Voice of Vietnam	Ho Chi Minh Museum	Hanoi	
13	President Ho Chi Minh's Testament	10 May 1965 – 19 May 1969; Original handwritten version	Archive Department of Central Committee Party Office	Hanoi	
14	Đồng Dương Buddhist statue	8th–19th century (Champa culture)	Ho Chi Minh City Museum of History	Ho Chi Minh City	
15	Devi Goddess statue of Hương Quế	10th century (Champa culture)	Ho Chi Minh City Museum of History	Ho Chi Minh City	
16	Vishnu statue	3rd–5th century (Óc Eo culture)	Ho Chi Minh City Museum of History	Ho Chi Minh City	
17	Lợi Mỹ Buddha Statue	4th–6th century (Óc Eo culture)	Ho Chi Minh City Museum of History	Ho Chi Minh City	
18	God Surya statue	6th–7th century (Óc Eo culture)	Ho Chi Minh City Museum of History	Ho Chi Minh City	
19	Tara Bodhisattva statue	9th–early 10th century (Champa culture)	Museum of Cham Sculpture	Đà Nẵng	
20	Mỹ Sơn E1 altar	7th century (Champa culture)	Museum of Cham Sculpture	Đà Nẵng	
21	Trà Kiệu altar	7th–8th century (Champa culture)	Museum of Cham Sculpture	Đà Nẵng	
22	Amitabha Buddha Statue	11th century (Lý dynasty)	Phật Tích Temple	Tiên Du District, Bắc Ninh	
23	Statue of Quan Âm with thousand eyes and hands	c. 1656 (Revival Lê dynasty)	Bút Tháp Temple	Thuận Thành, Bắc Ninh	
24	The set of nine holy bronze cannons	1803–1804 (Nguyễn dynasty)	Huế Monuments Conservation Centre	Imperial City of Huế, Huế	
25	The Nine Tripod Cauldrons	Nguyễn dynasty	Huế Monuments Conservation Centre	Imperial City of Huế, Huế	
26	The 37mm anti-aircraft gun	1954 (Battle of Dien Bien Phu)	Air Defence and Air Force Museum	Hanoi	
27	The MiG 21 F96 aircraft no. 5121	1972 (Operation Linebacker II)	Vietnam Military History Museum	Hanoi	
28	Ho Chi Minh Campaign notebook	25 April–1 May 1975 (Ho Chi Minh Campaign)	Museum of Military Zone 7	Ho Chi Minh City	
29	The T-54 tank no. 843	30 April 1975 (Liberation of Saigon)	Vietnam Military History Museum	Hanoi	
30	The T-59 tank no. 390	30 April 1975 (Liberation of Saigon)	Armored Forces Museum	Hanoi	

=== Set 2 ===
The second set of 37 national treasures was designated on 30 December 2013 by Decision No. 2599/QD-TTg signed by Deputy Prime Minister Vũ Đức Đam.

No.	Name	Date/Period/Culture	Owner	Location	Photo
1	Hung Temple bronze drum	Đông Sơn culture	Hùng Temple	Việt Trì, Phú Thọ Province	
2	Cam Giang I bronze drum	Đông Sơn culture	Thanh Hóa Provincial Museum	Thanh Hóa	
3	Viet Khe boat grave	Đông Sơn culture	National Museum of Vietnamese History	Hanoi	
4	Hop Minh bronze jar	Đông Sơn culture	Yên Bái Provincial Museum	Yên Bái	
5	The copper belt buckle	Đông Sơn culture	Hùng Temple	Việt Trì, Phú Thọ Province	
6	Nui Nua Short sword	Đông Sơn culture	Thanh Hóa Provincial Museum	Thanh Hóa	
7	Xa Loi Thap Minh stele	601; Sui dynasty	Bắc Ninh Provincial Museum	Bắc Ninh	
8	Bao Ninh Sung Phuc temple stele	Lý dynasty	Bao Ninh Sung Phuc Buddhist temple	Chiêm Hóa District, Tuyên Quang Province	
9	Sùng Thiện Diên Linh stele 大 越 國 李 家 第 四 帝 崇 善 延 齡 塔 碑	Lý dynasty	Long Doi Son Buddhist temple	Duy Tiên District, Tuyên Quang Province	
10	Sung Khanh temple stele	Trần dynasty	Sung Khanh Buddhist temple	Vị Xuyên District, Hà Giang Province	
11	Vinh Lang stele	Lê dynasty	Lam Kinh historic site	Thọ Xuân District, Thanh Hóa Province	
12	The bell of Binh Lam Temple	Trần dynasty	Binh Lam Buddhist temple	Vị Xuyên District, Hà Giang Province	
13	The bell of Van Ban Temple	Trần dynasty	National Museum of Vietnamese History	Hanoi	
14	The grand bell of Thien Mu Temple	Nguyễn lords era	Thien Mu Buddhist temple	Huế	
15	Stone Dragon (or Snake Deity statue)	Lý dynasty	Lê Văn Thịnh Temple	Gia Bình District, Bắc Ninh Province	
16	Amitabha Buddha Statue	Lý dynasty	Ngô Xa Buddhist Temple	Ý Yên District, Nam Định Province	
17	Quan Âm of Hoi Ha pagoda statue	Lê dynasty	Vietnam National Museum of Fine Arts	Hanoi	
18	Three statues of Buddhas in the three times	Lê dynasty	Linh Ung Buddhist temple	Thuận Thành District, Bắc Ninh Province	
19	Statue of Queen Trịnh Thị Ngọc Trúc	Revival Lê dynasty	Vietnam National Museum of Fine Arts	Hanoi	
20	Set of ceramic lamp base and incense burner	Mạc dynasty	Nam Định Provincial Museum	Nam Định	
21	Bronze cauldron	Revival Lê dynasty	Thanh Hóa Provincial Museum	Thanh Hóa	
22	Three Cannons Bảo quốc an dân đại tướng quân	Nguyễn dynasty	Hà Tĩnh Provincial Museum	Hà Tĩnh	
23	Vo Canh stele	Champa culture	National Museum of Vietnamese History	Hanoi	
24	Statue of Avalokitesvara Hoài Nhơn	Champa culture	Museum of Vietnamese History	Ho Chi Minh City	
25	Statue of Avalokitesvara Đại Hữu	Champa culture	Museum of Vietnamese History	Ho Chi Minh City	
26	Animal figure of Dốc Chùa	Đồng Nai culture (1,000 BC – 0)	Bình Dương Provincial Museum	Thủ Dầu Một	
27	Buddha statue of Bình Hòa	Óc Eo Culture	Museum of Vietnamese History	Ho Chi Minh City	
28	Buddha statue of Sa Đéc	Óc Eo Culture	Museum of Vietnamese History	Ho Chi Minh City	
29	Vishnu statue	Óc Eo Culture	Đồng Tháp Provincial Museum	Cao Lãnh	
30	Vishnu statue	Óc Eo Culture	Long An Provincial Museum	Tân An	
31	Durga Goddess statue	Óc Eo Culture	Museum of Vietnamese History	Ho Chi Minh City	
32	Avalokitesvara statue	Óc Eo Culture	Museum of Vietnamese History	Ho Chi Minh City	
33	Collection of golden artifacts	Óc Eo Culture	Long An Provincial Museum	Tân An	
34	Vườn Xuân Trung Nam Bắc; Painting "Spring garden of Central-South-North (of Viet Nam)"	1969–1989; Artist Nguyễn Gia Trí	Ho Chi Minh City Museum of Fine Arts	Ho Chi Minh City	
35	Hai thiếu nữ và em bé Painting "Two young girls and a kid"	1944; Artist Tô Ngọc Vân	Vietnam National Museum of Fine Arts	Hanoi	
36	Em Thúy; Painting "Little Sister Thuy"	1943; Artist Trần Văn Cẩn	Vietnam National Museum of Fine Arts	Hanoi	
37	Kết nạp Đảng ở Điện Biên Phủ; Painting "Granting Party membership in Dien Bien Phu"	1956; Artist Nguyễn Sáng	Vietnam National Museum of Fine Arts	Hanoi	

=== Set 3 ===
The third set of 12 national treasure was designated on 14 January 2015 by Decision No. 53/QD-TTg signed by Deputy Prime Minister Vu Duc Dam.

No.	Name	Date/Period/Culture	Owner	Location	Photo
1	Huu Chung bronze drum	Đông Sơn culture	Hải Dương Provincial Museum	Hải Dương	
2	Thanh Mai bronze bell	798; Tang dynasty	Ha Noi City Museum	Hanoi	
3	Stone stele records of imperial examinations of the Lê and Mạc dynasties	1484–1780	Văn Miếu	Hanoi	
4	Khôn Nguyên Chí Đức Chi Bi stele 坤元至德之碑	1498	Lam Kinh historic site	Thọ Xuân District, Thanh Hóa Province	
5	Thủy Môn Đình stele 體存碑記	1670	Lạng Sơn Provincial Museum	Lạng Sơn	
6	Statue of Quan Âm with thousand eyes and hands	16th century	Dao Xuyen Buddhist Temple	Gia Lâm District, Hanoi	
7	Set of Amitābha, Mahāsthāmaprāpta and Avalokiteśvara statues 阿彌陀三尊	17th century	Thay Buddhist temple	Quốc Oai District, Hanoi	
8	Collection of Buddhist statues at Tay Phuong temple	Tây Sơn dynasty	Tay Phuong Buddhist temple	Thạch Thất District, Hanoi	
9	Ekamukhalinga/Linga with Shiva head	8th century	Mỹ Sơn sacred site	Duy Xuyên District, Quảng Nam Province	
10	Stone Stairway Railing	12th century	Nam Định Provincial Museum	Nam Định	
11	The MiG-21 aircraft no. 4324	Operation Rolling Thunder 1965–1968	Vietnam Military History Museum	Hanoi	
12	Ho Chi Minh Campaign Determination Map	Ho Chi Minh Campaign 1975	Vietnam Military History Museum	Hanoi	

=== Set 4 ===
The fourth set of 25 national treasure was designated on 23 December 2015 by Decision No. 2382/QD-TTg signed by Deputy Prime Minister Vu Duc Dam.

No.	Name	Date/Period/Culture	Owner	Location	Photo
1	Co Loa bronze drum and collection of ploughshare	Đông Sơn culture	Ha Noi City Museum	Hanoi	
2	The pair of Lô Lô bronze drum	5th century CE	Hà Giang Provincial Museum	Hà Giang	
3	Buddhist sutra inscripted pillar	995 CE	Nhat Tru Temple	Hoa Lư	
4	Statue of Vishnu	6th century CE	Đồng Tháp Provincial Museum	Cao Lãnh	
5	Statue of Lakshmi	7th century CE	Bạc Liêu Provincial Museum	Bạc Liêu	
6	Statue of Lakshmi	7th century CE	Đồng Tháp Provincial Museum	Cao Lãnh	
7	Head of Shiva statue	Early 10th century CE	Quảng Nam Provincial Museum	Tam Kỳ	
8	Statue of Sadashiva	12th century CE	Bạc Liêu Provincial Museum	Bạc Liêu	
9	Head of Shiva statue	12th century CE	Bạc Liêu Provincial Museum	Bạc Liêu	
10	Statue of Trấn Vũ	1802 CE	Tran Vu Temple	Long Biên District, Hanoi	
11	Vân Trạch Hòa altar	9th or 10th century CE	Thừa Thiên Hue Provincial Museum	Huế	
12	Relief of Goddess Mahishasuramardini	Early 12th century CE	Bình Định Provincial Museum	Quy Nhơn	
13	Stone altar of Kham Lang	1432 CE	Kham Lang Buddhist temple	Lục Nam District, Bắc Giang Province	
14	Relief of Lac Long Quan and characters of Hồng Bàng period	c. late 19th – early 20th century CE	Noi temple (or Lac Long Quan temple)	Thanh Oai District, Hanoi	
15	Terracotta house model	Trần dynasty	Nam Định Provincial Museum	Nam Định	
16	Thanh Hư Động stele 清虛洞碑	Long Khánh era c. 1372–1377	Côn Sơn Buddhist temple	Chí Linh	
17	Nam Giao stele 南郊殿碑	1679 CE	National Museum of Vietnamese History	Hanoi	
18	Khiêm Cung Ký stele 謙恭記碑	1875 CE	Hue Monuments Conservation Centre	Tomb of Tự Đức, Huế	
19	Collection of 10 cylindrical cauldrons of Nguyễn Lords	1659–1684 CE	Hue Monuments Conservation Centre	Huế Museum of Royal Fine Arts and Imperial City, Hue	
20	Lotus-shaped nine-storey prayer wheel (Cửu Phẩm Liên Hoa)	17th century CE	Giam Buddhist temple	Cẩm Giàng District, Hải Dương Province	
21	Porcelain lamp base	1582 (5th year of Diên Thành)	Hanoi Museum	Hanoi	
22	Bát Tràng porcelain religious palanquin (long đình)	17th century CE	Hanoi Museum	Hanoi	
23	The golden seal Sắc mệnh chi bảo 敕命之寶	1827 (8th year of Minh Mệnh)	National Museum of Vietnamese History	Hanoi	
24	The imperial throne of Nguyễn Emperors	1802 CE (1st year of Gia Long)	Hue Monuments Conservation Centre	Hall of Supreme Harmony, Imperial City, Hue	
25	Nguyễn Emperors' robe for Heavenly Sacrifice Ritual (龍袞)	1802 CE	Hue Monuments Conservation Centre	Huế Museum of Royal Fine Arts, Imperial City of Hue	

=== Set 5 ===
The fifth set of 14 national treasure was designated on 22 December 2016 by Decision No. 2496/QD-TTg signed by Deputy Prime Minister Vu Duc Dam.

1	Lingam crystal figurine	5th – 6th century CE	Trà Vinh Provincial Museum	Trà Vinh
2	Relief of Tra Lien 1	late 9th century CE	Quảng Trị Provincial Museum	Đông Hà
3	Relief of Tra Lien 2	late 9th century CE	Quảng Trị Provincial Museum	Đông Hà
4	Relief of Brahma	12th – 13th century CE	Bình Định Provincial Museum	Quy Nhơn
5	Jar with glazed brown pattern	13th-14th century CE (Trần dynasty)	National Museum of Vietnamese History	Hanoi
6	Thanh Mai Viên Thông tháp bi stele 青梅圓通塔碑	1362 CE	Thanh Mai Buddhist temple	Chí Linh
7	Lê Thái Tổ's stele	1431 CE	Lê Thái Tổ temple	Nậm Nhùn District, Lai Châu Province
8	Đại Việt Lam Sơn Chiêu Lăng bi stele (Lê Thánh Tông's tomb stele) 大越藍山昭陵碑	late 15th century CE	Lam Kinh historic site	Thọ Xuân District, Thanh Hóa Province
9	Da Quan pair of bells	1611 CE (Mạc dynasty)	Đà Quận Buddhist temple	Cao Bằng
10	Two statues of Zen masters Vu Khac Minh and Vu Khac Truong	mid 17th century CE	Đậu Buddhist temple	Thường Tín District, Hanoi
11	Bronze statue of Trấn Vũ	late 17th – early 18th century CE	Quán Thánh Taoist Temple	Ba Đình District, Hanoi
12	Lotus-shaped nine-storey prayer wheel (Cửu Phẩm Liên Hoa)	1692 CE	Dong Ngô Buddhist temple	Thanh Hà District, Hải Dương Province
13	The golden seal Đại Việt quốc Nguyễn chúa vĩnh trấn chi bảo 大越國阮主永鎭之寶	1709 CE (5th year of Vĩnh Thịnh)	National Museum of Vietnamese History	Hanoi
14	The Executive Orders collection by Chairman of Provisional Government of the Democratic Republic of Vietnam (1945–1946)	30 August 1945 – 28 February 1946	National Archives Center III, State Records and Archives Department of Vietnam	Hanoi

=== Set 6 ===
The sixth set of 24 national treasures was designated on 25 December 2017 by Decision No. 2089/QD-TTg signed by Deputy Prime Minister Vu Duc Dam.

No.	Name	Date/Period/Culture	Owner	Location	Photo
1	Dagger with handle of snake and elephant figurine	c. 2500–2000 Before Present	Nghệ An Provincial Museum	Vinh	
2	Ladle with elephant figurine handle	c. 2500–2000 Before Present	Nghệ An Provincial Museum	Vinh	
3	Loc Hoa lithophone	c. 3000 Before Present	Bình Phước Provincial Museum	Đồng Xoài	
4	Nhon Thanh casting mold	1th – 7th century CE	Cần Thơ Municipal Museum	Cần Thơ	
5	Śarīra box of Nhan Pagoda	7th – 8th century CE	Nghệ An Provincial Museum	Vinh	
6	Relief of Champa Buddha on Central Highland	6th – 7th century CE	Gia Lai Provincial Museum	Pleiku	
7	Vishnu statue of Go Thanh	1431 CE	Tiền Giang Provincial Museum	Mỹ Tho	
8	The pair of Garuda killing snake statues	mid 13th century CE	Bình Định Provincial Museum	Quy Nhơn	
9	10 Holy animal statues of Phat Tich	11th century CE	Phat Tich Buddhist temple	Tiên Du District, Bắc Ninh Province	
10	Four statues of Tứ Pháp Goddesses in Dâu-Luy Lâu historical region	18th century CE	Dâu Buddhist temple Phi Tướng Buddhist temple Dàn Buddhist temple	Thuận Thành, Bắc Ninh Province	
11	Dragon engraved pillar of Dạm Buddhist temple	11th century CE	Dạm Buddhist temple	Bắc Ninh	
12	Đại Việt Lam Sơn Dụ Lăng Bi stele (Lê Hiến Tông's tomb stele) 大越藍山裕陵碑	c.1504	Lam Kinh historic site	Thọ Xuân District, Thanh Hóa Province	
13	Collection of cliff inscriptions in Kinh Chu Cave	14th century – early 20th century	The Local Government of Kinh Môn District	Kinh Môn, Hải Dương Province	
14	Côn Sơn Tư Phúc tự bi stele 崑山資福寺碑	1607 CE	Côn Sơn Buddhist temple	Chí Linh	
15	Inscribed stone box of Đồi Cốc	1549 CE	Shrine of Giáp Hải	Bắc Giang	
16	Dragon figures engraved doors of Keo temple	17th century CE	Vietnam National Museum of Fine Arts	Hanoi	
17	A pair of dragon figures engraved stone beds	17th century CE	Shrine of Emperor Đinh Tiên Hoàng	Hoa Lư	
18	Woodblocks of Bổ Đà Buddhist temple	mid 18th century – early 20th century	Bo Da Buddhist temple	Việt Yên, Bắc Giang Province	
19	Jade Heirloom Seal of the Realm of the Nguyễn dynasty Đại Nam thụ thiên vĩnh mệnh truyền quốc tỷ 大 南 受 天 永 命 傳 國 璽	1847 (The 7th year of Thiệu Trị)	National Museum of Vietnamese History	Hanoi	
20	Lacquered folding screen named Thiếu nữ và phong cảnh "Young ladies and garden landscape"	1939; Artist Nguyễn Gia Trí	Vietnam National Museum of Fine Arts	Hanoi	
21	Bác Hồ ở Chiến khu Việt Bắc; Painting "Uncle Ho in Việt Bắc military zone"	1980; Artist Dương Bích Liên	Vietnam National Museum of Fine Arts	Hanoi	
22	Gióng; Painting "Gióng"	1990; Artist Nguyễn Tư Nghiêm	Vietnam National Museum of Fine Arts	Hanoi	
23	Thanh niên thành đồng Painting "The Youth of the Bronze Fortress"	1967–1978; Artist Nguyễn Sáng	Ho Chi Minh City Museum of Fine Arts	Ho Chi Minh City	
24	Naval cargo ship registration number HQ671	1962	Museum of the Vietnamese Navy	Hải Phòng	

=== Set 7 ===
The seventh set of 22 national treasures was designated on 24 December 2018 by Decision No. 1821/QD-TTg signed by Deputy Prime Minister Vu Duc Dam.

No.	Name	Date/Period/Culture	Owner	Location	Photo
1	Đầu Rằm pottery jar	c. 3400–3000 Before Present (late Phùng Nguyên culture)	Quảng Ninh Provincial Museum	Hạ Long	
2	Long Thạnh collection of terracotta vases	3370 ± 40 Before Present (pre-Sa Huỳnh culture)	Quảng Ngãi Provincial Museum	Quảng Ngãi	
3	Statue of a Champa monk in Phu Hung	9th – 10th century CE	Quảng Ngãi Provincial Museum	Quảng Ngãi	
4	Pha Long bronze drum	Đông Sơn culture	Lào Cai Provincial Museum	Lào Cai	
5	Wooden burial jar with a bronze drum as lid in Phu Chanh	Bronze drum: 2nd century – 1st century BC; Wooden jar: 2.100 ± 40 Before Present	Bình Dương Provincial Museum	Thủ Dầu Một	
6	Nhơn Thành Buddha statue	6th – 7th century CE	Cần Thơ Municipal Museum	Cần Thơ	
7	Nhơn Thành pottery jar	5th century CE	Cần Thơ Municipal Museum	Cần Thơ	
8	A set of stone Linga and Yoni	5th – 6th century CE	An Giang Provincial Museum	Long Xuyên	
9	Giong Xoai Brahma statue	6th – 7th century CE	An Giang Provincial Museum	Long Xuyên	
10	Vung Liem Vishnu statue	6th – 7th century CE	Vĩnh Long Provincial Museum	Vĩnh Long	
11	Son Tho-Trà Vinh Buddha statue	6th – 7th century CE	Ho Chi Minh City Museum	Ho Chi Minh City	
12	Duong Le Uma statue	9th – 10th century CE	Quảng Trị Provincial Museum	Đông Hà	
13	Statue of Shiva at Linh Son temple	15th century CE	Linh Son Buddhist temple	Quy Nhơn	
14	Statue of Quan Âm with thousand eyes and hands	early 15th century CE	Me So Buddhist temple	Văn Giang District, Hưng Yên Province	
15	Đồng Dương altar pedestal	9th – 10th century CE	Museum of Cham Sculpture	Da Nang	
16	Golden flower shaped box of Ngoa Van-Yen Tu	14th century CE	Quảng Ninh Provincial Museum	Hạ Long	
17	Sùng Thiên tự bi stele 崇天寺碑	1331 (The 3rd year of Khai Hựu)	Dâu (or Sùng Thiên) Buddhist temple	Gia Lộc District, Hải Dương Province	
18	Glazed ceramic pagoda of Trò temple	14th century CE	Vĩnh Phúc Provincial Museum	Vĩnh Yên	
19	Bronze seal Tuần phủ Đô tướng quân (Imperial Commissioner and Acting Army General seal) 奉 命 巡 撫 都 將 軍 印	1515 (The 6th year of Hồng Thuận)	Quảng Bình Provincial Museum	Đồng Hới	
20	Golden book Đế hệ thi (Poem of the Royal Clan Names) 帝 系 詩 金 册	1823 (The 4th year of Minh Mạng)	National Museum of Vietnamese History	Hanoi	
21	Bronze printing molds of 5 Vietnam Dong credit notes	1947	Ho Chi Minh City Museum	Ho Chi Minh City	
22	International truck assembled from various parts of Ford, Studebaker and Renault	1949	Museum of Army Logistics	Hanoi	

=== Set 8 ===
The eighth set of 27 national treasures was designated on 15 January 2020 by Decision No. 88/QD-TTg signed by Deputy Prime Minister Vu Duc Dam.

No.	Name	Date/Period/Culture	Owner	Location	Photo
1	Collection of precious stone objects Nha chương (牙璋)	c. 3500 Before Present (Phùng Nguyên culture)	Hùng Kings Museum	Việt Trì	
2	Quảng Chính bronze drum	Đông Sơn culture	Quảng Ninh Provincial Museum	Hạ Long	
3	Trà Lộc bronze drum	c. 2500 Before Present (Đông Sơn culture)	Quảng Trị Provincial Museum	Đông Hà	
4	Wooden Linga-Yoni of Nhơn Thành	Óc Eo culture	Cần Thơ Municipal Museum	Cần Thơ	
5	Wooden Buddha statue of Giồng Xoài	4th-6th century (Óc Eo culture)	An Giang Provincial Museum	Long Xuyên	
6	Stone Buddha statue of Khánh Bình	6th-7th century (Óc Eo culture)	An Giang Provincial Museum	Long Xuyên	
7	Stone lion statue of Hương Lãng temple	late 11th-12th century	Hương Lãng Buddhist temple	Văn Lâm District, Hưng Yên Province	
8	The pair of stone lions at Ba Tam temple	12th century	Bà Tấm temple	Gia Lâm District, Hanoi	
9	The pair of Dharmapala statues at Nhan Son temple	12th-13th century	Nhạn Sơn Buddhist temple	An Nhơn, Bình Định Province	
10	Statue of Au Co mother goddess	19th century	Âu Cơ mother goddess temple	Hạ Hòa District, Phú Thọ Province	
11	Bell of Nhat Tao	10th century	Nhật Tảo communal house	Bắc Từ Liêm District, Hanoi	
12	Cổ Việt thôn Diên Phúc tự bi minh stele 古越村延福寺碑銘	Ly (1157) and Tran (1317) dynasties	Cảnh Lâm Buddhist temple	Yên Mỹ District, Hưng Yên Province	
13	Cliff inscription of King Lê Thái Tổ	1431 CE	People's Committee of Hoa An District	Hòa An District, Cao Bằng Province	
14	Đại Việt Lam Sơn Kính Lăng Bi stele (Lê Túc Tông's tomb stele) 大越藍山敬陵碑	1505 CE	Lam Kinh historic site	Thọ Xuân District, Thanh Hóa Province	
15	Sùng chỉ bi ký stele 崇址碑記	1696 CE	Hà Tông Mục temple	Can Lộc District, Hà Tĩnh Province	
16	Ngự kiến Thiên Mụ tự stele 御建天姥寺碑	1715 CE	Thiên Mụ Buddhist temple	Huế	
17	12 doctoral stelae of Bắc Ninh Confucian temple	1889 CE	Bắc Ninh Confucian temple	Bắc Ninh	
18	The top part of Champa Linh Thái temple-tower	12th-13th century	Thừa Thiên Hue Provincial Museum	Huế	
19	Bronze jar of Trần dynasty	13th-14th century	Quảng Ninh Provincial Museum	Hạ Long	
20	Multi-coloured glazed pottery pedestal dish	Later Lê dynasty early period c. 15th century	Quảng Ninh Provincial Museum	Hạ Long	
21	Wooden liturgical mini pavilion decorated with red paint and gold gilding	16th century	Bà Tấm temple	Gia Lâm District, Hanoi	
22	Wooden mini throne with red paint and gold gilding	16th century	Thái Bình Provincial Museum	Thái Bình	
23	Lintel above altar of Diềm communal house	17th century	Diềm communal house	Bắc Ninh	
24	The ceremonial weapon at Đinh Tiên Hoàng temple	17th century	Old Capital of Hoa Lư Historic Site	Hoa Lư District, Ninh Bình Province	
25	The ceremonial weapons at Lê Đại Hành temple	17th century	Old Capital of Hoa Lư Historic Site	Hoa Lư District, Ninh Bình Province	
26	Long đao (blade) of Mạc dynasty	17th-18th century	Mạc dynasty Memorial Historic Site	Hải Phòng	
27	Lương Tài hầu chi ấn seal 良才侯之印	19th century	Ho Chi Minh City Museum	Ho Chi Minh City	

=== Set 9 ===
The ninth set of 24 national treasures was designated on 31 December 2020 by Decision No. 2283/QD-TTg signed by Deputy Prime Minister Vu Duc Dam.

No.	Name	Date/Period/Culture	Owner	Location	Photo
1	Collection of arrowhead moulds in Co Loa	3rd-2nd century BC; Đông Sơn culture	Cổ Loa Historic Site	Hanoi	
2	Collection of weaving tools in Phu Chanh	late 3rd-1st century BC	Bình Dương Provincial Museum	Thủ Dầu Một	
3	Linga-Yoni of Linh Sơn	7st century	An Giang Provincial Museum	Long Xuyên	
4	Gold jewelries collection of Trà Veo 3 and Lâm Thượng	10th-12th century	Quảng Ngãi Provincial Museum	Quảng Ngãi	
5	Collection of lotus-shaped gold dishes in Cộng Vũ	11th-12th century	State Treasury of Hưng Yên Province	Hưng Yên	
6	Kính Hoa bronze drum	4th-3rd century BC; Đông Sơn culture	Private collection of Nguyễn Văn Kính	Hanoi	
7	Ganesha statue	7th-8th century Champa culture	Museum of Cham Sculpture	Da Nang	
8	Gajasimha statue	12th century Champa culture	Museum of Cham Sculpture	Da Nang	
9	Statue of a male deity	11th-12th century (Óc Eo culture)	Bạc Liêu Provincial Museum	Bạc Liêu	
10	Statue of the enlightened Emperor Trần Nhân Tông	17th century CE	Huệ Quang Pagoda, Yên Tử Buddhist complex	Uông Bí	
11	Statue of Emperor Mạc Đăng Dung	16th century CE	Trà Phương Buddhist temple	Hải Phòng	
12	Three statues of Buddhas in the three times of But Thap temple	17th century CE	But Thap Temple	Thuận Thành District, Bắc Ninh Province	
13	Relief of Sarasvati	12th century CE	Bình Định Provincial Museum	Quy Nhơn	
14	Relief of King Po Rome	17th century CE	Po Rome Tower	Ninh Phước District, Ninh Thuận Province	
15	Relief of the Grand empress dowager Vũ Thị Ngọc Toàn	16th century CE	Trà Phương Buddhist temple	Hải Phòng	
16	Hòa Lai stele	late 8th-early 9th century	Ninh Thuận Provincial Museum	Phan Rang–Tháp Chàm	
17	Stairway Railing of Hương Lãng temple	late 11th-early 12th century	Hương Lãng Buddhist temple	Văn Lâm District, Hưng Yên Province	
18	Dragon handrail of Kính Thiên Palace	15th century	Imperial Citadel of Thăng Long	Hanoi	
19	Brown glazed pot in shape of Kinnari	11th-12th century	Quảng Ninh Provincial Museum	Hạ Long	
20	White glazed pot in shape of lotus	11th-12th century	Quảng Ninh Provincial Museum	Hạ Long	
21	Brown glazed cylindrical jar	11th-12th century	Quảng Ninh Provincial Museum	Hạ Long	
22	Stone altar of But Thap temple	17th century CE	But Thap Temple	Thuận Thành District, Bắc Ninh Province	
23	Lotus-shaped nine-storey prayer wheel of But Thap temple (Cửu Phẩm Liên Hoa)	17th century CE	But Thap Temple	Thuận Thành District, Bắc Ninh Province	
24	Lintel above altar of Thổ Hà communal house	17th century CE	Thổ Hà communal house	Việt Yên, Bắc Giang Province	

=== Set 10 ===
The tenth set of 23 national treasures was designated on 25 December 2021 by Decision No. 2198/QĐ-TTg signed by Deputy Prime Minister Vu Duc Dam.

No.	Name	Date/Period/Culture	Owner	Location	Photo
1	Gia Phú bronze drum	Đông Sơn culture	Lào Cai Provincial Museum	Lào Cai	
2	Đông Sơn culture bronze jar	Đông Sơn culture	Quảng Ninh Provincial Museum	Hạ Long	
3	Giồng Lớn golden mask	1st century BC - 2nd century CE	Bà Rịa - Vũng Tàu Provincial Museum	Vũng Tàu	
4	Long Giao bronze axes collection	1st - 2nd century CE	Đồng Nai Provincial Museum	Biên Hòa	
5	Relief of Buddhist of Linh Sơn Bắc	3rd - 4th century	An Giang Provincial Museum	An Giang	
6	Nandi ring of Giồng Cát	5th century	An Giang Provincial Museum	An Giang	
7	Vishnu statue of Bình Hòa	6th - 7th century	Đồng Nai Provincial Museum	Biên Hòa	
8	Gò Thành elephant-carved gold leaves collection	6th - 8th century	An Giang Provincial Museum	Long Xuyên	
9	Mỹ Sơn A10 altar	9th - 10th century	A10 Temple, Mỹ Sơn sacred site	Duy Xuyên District, Quảng Nam Province	
10	Phoenix-carved bodhi leaf of terracotta	11th century	Imperial Citadel of Thăng Long	Hanoi	
11	An Biên white glazed ceramic collection	11th - 12th century	Trần Đình Thăng's private collection	Haiphong	
12	Relief of Dharmapala of Mả Chùa	12th century	Bình Định Provincial Museum	Quy Nhơn	
13	An Sinh jar with glazed brown pattern	13th century	Quảng Ninh Provincial Museum	Hạ Long	
14	Trần dynasty brown glazed cylindrical jar	Trần dynasty	Quảng Ninh Provincial Museum	Hạ Long	
15	Buddhist stone altar of Xuân Lũng pagoda	14th century	Xuân Lũng Pagoda	Lâm Thao District, Phú Thọ province	
16	Two royal ceramic bowls of Imperial Citadel of Thăng Long	15th century	Imperial Citadel of Thăng Long	Hanoi	
17	Multicoulour glazed pottery jar	15th century	Quảng Ninh Provincial Museum	Hạ Long	
18	Terracotta pagoda of An Xá temple	16th - 17th century	An Xá Temple	Tiên Lữ District, Hưng Yên province	
19	Tứ Kỳ Buddhist temple pillar-stele	17th century	National Museum of Vietnamese History	Hanoi	
20	Keo Buddhist temple pillar-stele	17th century	Keo Pagoda	Vũ Thư District, Thái Bình Province	
21	The golden seal Hoàng đế Tôn thân chi bảo 皇帝尊親㞢寶	1827	National Museum of Vietnamese History	Hanoi	
22	Woodblocks of book Enthusiastic Insights about Medical Practice by Hải Thượng Lãn Ông; Hải Thượng y tông tâm lĩnh 海上醫宗心嶺	1885	Bắc Ninh Provincial Museum	Bắc Ninh	
23	Collection of the emblem of Vietnam sketches	1953 - 1955; Artist Bùi Trang Chước	National Archives Center III; State Records and Archives Department of Vietnam	Hanoi	

=== Set 11 ===
The eleventh set of 27 national treasures was designated on 30 January 2023 by Decision No. 41/QĐ-TTg signed by Deputy Prime Minister Trần Hồng Hà.

No.	Name	Date/Period/Culture	Owner	Location	Photo
1	An Khê collection of Lower Paleolithic tools	Lower Paleolithic (c. 800.000 Before Present)	Gia Lai Provincial Museum	Pleiku	
2	Tiên Nội I bronze drum	Đông Sơn culture (4th–3rd century BC)	Hà Nam Provincial Museum	Phủ Lý	
3	Kính Hoa II bronze drum	2nd–1st century BC	Private collection of Nguyễn Văn Kính	Hanoi	
4	Đông Sơn culture bronze jar	Đông Sơn culture (3rd–2nd century BC)	Nam Hồng Royal Museum	Từ Sơn	
5	Kính Hoa bronze jar	3rd–2nd century BC	Private collection of Nguyễn Văn Kính	Hanoi	
6	Collection of đàn đá of Bình Đa	3000 BP	Đồng Nai Provincial Museum	Biên Hòa	
7	Mukhalinga of Ba Thê	6th century - Funan Kingdom	An Giang Provincial Museum	Long Xuyên	
8	Pair of stone elephants at ancient Champa archaeological site of Vijaya	late 7th century - Champa kingdom	Vijaya	An Nhơn District, Bình Định Province	
9	Two celadon dishes	Lý dynasty (6th–7th century)	Trần Đình Thăng's private collection	Haiphong	
10	Blue purple glazed ceramic dish	Later Lê dynasty early period (15th century)	Trần Đình Thăng's private collection	Haiphong	
11	Trần dynasty dragon head	Trần dynasty (13th century)	Thăng Long Heritage Conservation Center	Hanoi	
12	Giầu Pagoda stele (Ngô gia thị bi)	Trần dynasty (9th year of Đại Trị – 1366)	Giầu pagoda	Phủ Lý	
13	Tĩnh Lự Pagoda stone stele	Revival Lê dynasty (6th year of Phúc Thái – 1648)	Tĩnh Lự Pagoda	Gia Bình District, Bắc Ninh Province	
14	The bell of Rối Pagoda	late 14th century	Hà Tĩnh Provincial Museum	Hà Tĩnh	
15	Blue and white ceramic incense burner	Lê dynasty (15th century)	Trần Đình Thăng's private collection	Haiphong	
16	Quan Âm statue of Cung Kiệm Pagoda	Later Lê dynasty early period (7th year of Thái Hoà – 1449)	Cung Kiệm Pagoda	Quế Võ District, Bắc Ninh Province	
17	Collection of royal blue and white ceramic bowls and dishes in the later Lê dynasty early period	Later Lê dynasty early period (15th–early 16th century)	Thăng Long Heritage Conservation Center	Hanoi	
18	Weapon collection of Trường Giảng Võ	15th–18th century	Hanoi Museum	Hanoi	
19	Terracotta altar of An Xá Temple	c. 16th century	An Xá Temple	Tiên Lữ District, Hưng Yên province	
20	Two bronze agarwood burning towers, nghê statue lids	16th–17th century	Trần Đình Thăng's private collection	Haiphong	
21	Dragon handrail of Kính Thiên Palace	17th century	Thăng Long Heritage Conservation Center	Hanoi	
22	Set of three Patriarchs of the Trúc Lâm Zen sect statues of Phổ Minh Temple	17th century	Phổ Minh Temple	Nam Định	
23	The Revival Lê dynasty cannon	Revival Lê dynasty (17th century)	Thăng Long Heritage Conservation Center	Hanoi	
24	Golden book of elevation for the Empress Dowager of the Nation	Revival Lê dynasty (57th year of Cảnh Hưng – 1796)	Vietnam National Museum of History	Hanoi	
25	An Dương Vương statue	Nguyễn dynasty (1897)	Cổ Loa Historic Site - Thăng Long Heritage Conservation Center	Đông Anh District, Hanoi	
26	Chân dung Chủ tịch Hồ Chí Minh; Statue "Portrait of President Hồ Chí Minh"	1946; Artist Nguyễn Thị Kim	Vietnam National Museum of History	Hanoi	
27	The T-59 tank No. 377	Battle of Kontum (1972)	People's Committee of Đăk Tô District, Kon Tum Province	Đăk Tô District, Kon Tum Province	

== See also ==
- National treasure
- List of Chinese cultural relics forbidden to be exhibited abroad
- National Treasures of Japan
- National Treasures of North Korea
- National Treasures of South Korea
- National Treasures of Taiwan
