= National treasure (disambiguation) =

A national treasure is a shared cultural asset, or a rare cultural object valued by a nation.

National Treasure or National Treasures can also refer to:

== Television ==
- National Treasure (franchise), Disney film series
  - National Treasure (film), first film of the series
  - National Treasure: Edge of History, a television series continuation of the franchise
- National Treasure (British TV series), British television drama
- National Treasure (Chinese TV series), Chinese TV series
- Kokuho (film), a 2025 Japanese historical drama

== Music ==
- National Treasures – The Complete Singles, Manic Street Preachers album
- "National Treasures" (song), a 2026 song by Drake

== Cultural assets ==
- National treasure of France
- National Treasure (Japan)
- National Treasure (North Korea)
- National Treasures (South Korea)
- National Treasure (Vietnam)

== Others uses ==
- National Treasure (horse), the winner of the 2023 Preakness Stakes

== See also ==
- Living National Treasure (disambiguation)
