= Việt Khê archaeological site =

Archaeological site in Northern Vietnam

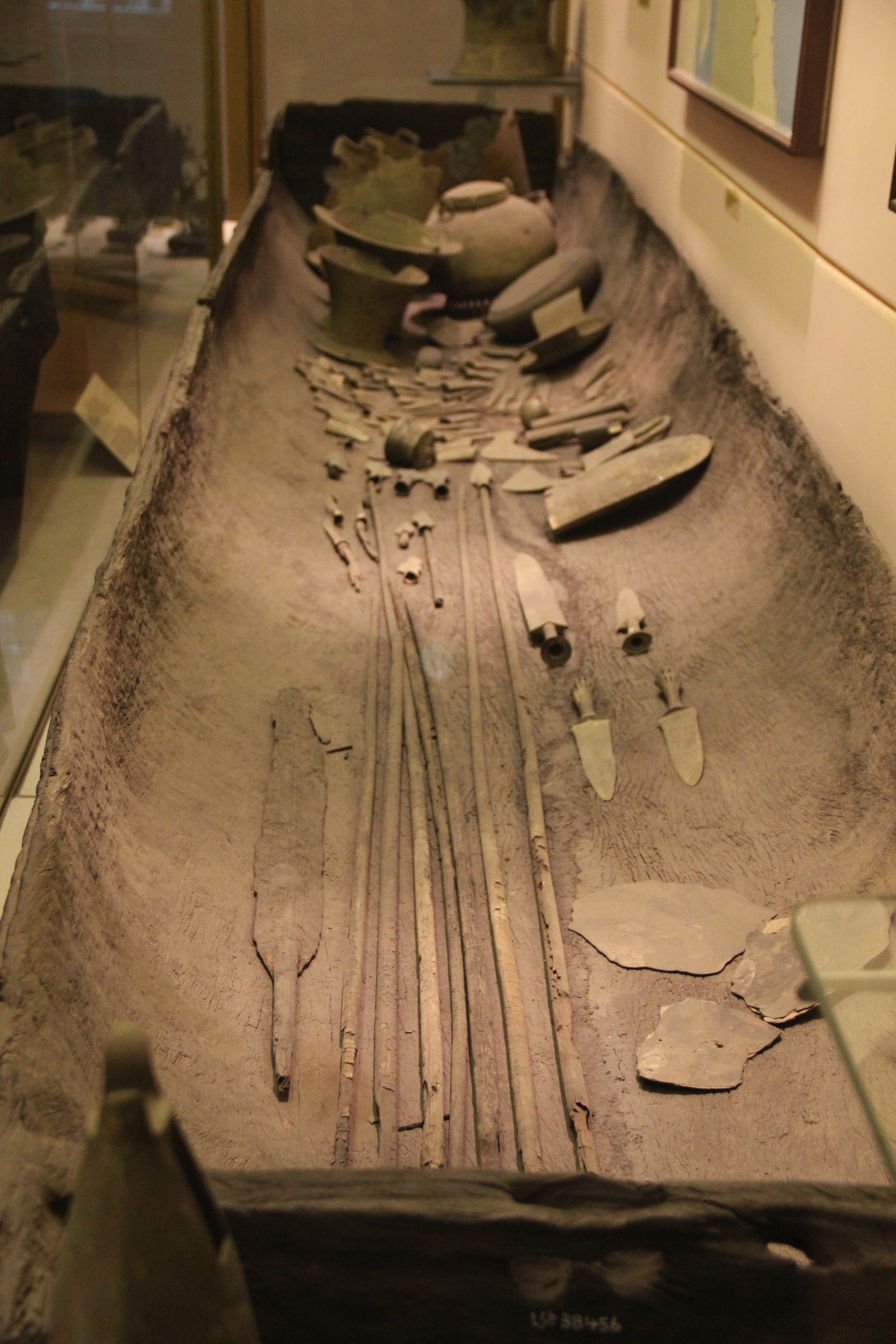
Viet Khe boat-shaped coffin M2 with bronze funerary artifacts in National Museum of Vietnamese History

Việt Khê is an archaeological site in the Red River Delta in northern Vietnam. Excavations there yielded a number of coffins containing relics of the Dong Son culture in Bronze Age. The Việt Khê construction site is located on the southern base of a hill which overlooks the Hàn River near Thủy Nguyên District, Haiphong. Five wooden coffins were excavated in 1961, each of which were aligned in the east–west direction, with at least two pairs of coffins being configured in a linear manner.

In 2013, the largest coffin and its contained artifacts found at Việt Khê was designated as a national treasure of Vietnam by the Vietnamese Prime Minister. In 2016, the complete burial ensemble were brought to Germany primarily for conservation and had to be accompanied by Vietnamese conservators. Only by this context, a permit was issued by the Prime Minister of Vietnam for the first time regarding a national treasure loan to the exhibition “Archaeological Treasures from Vietnam” in Herne, Chemnitz and Mannheim.

== Artifacts ==
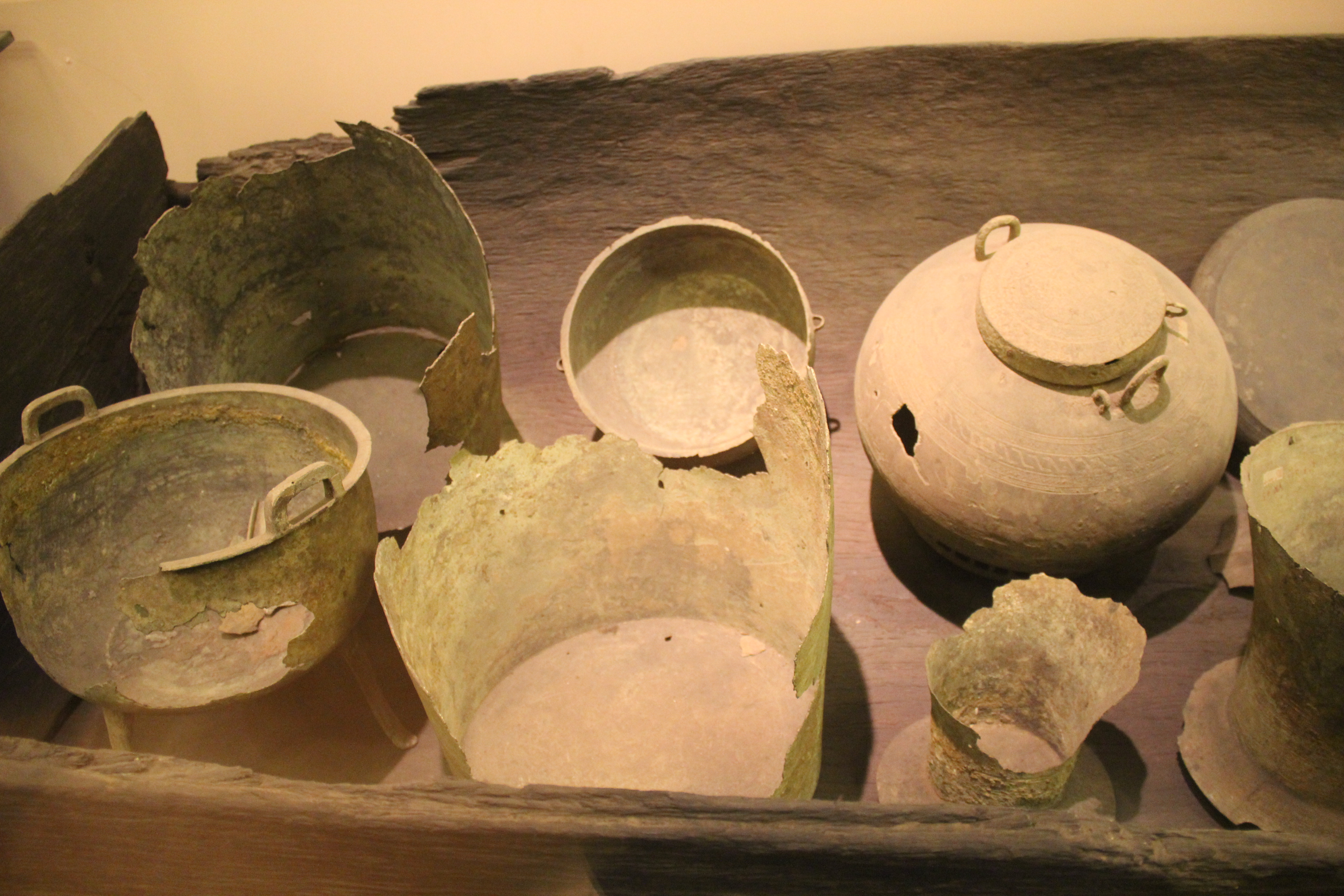
(From left to right, clockwise) thạp, âu, bình, thố, thạp, đỉnh

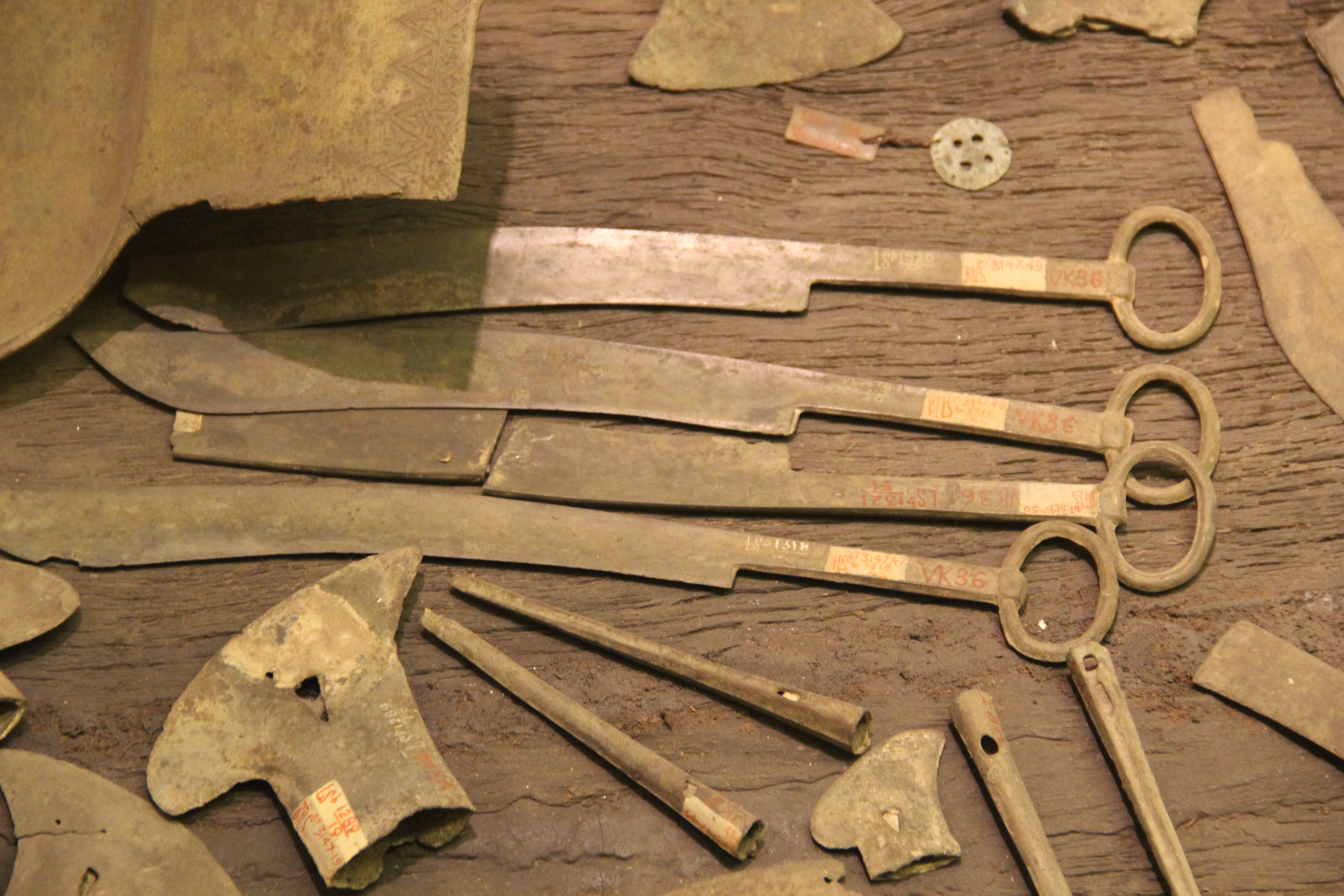
Four ring-handled bronze knives

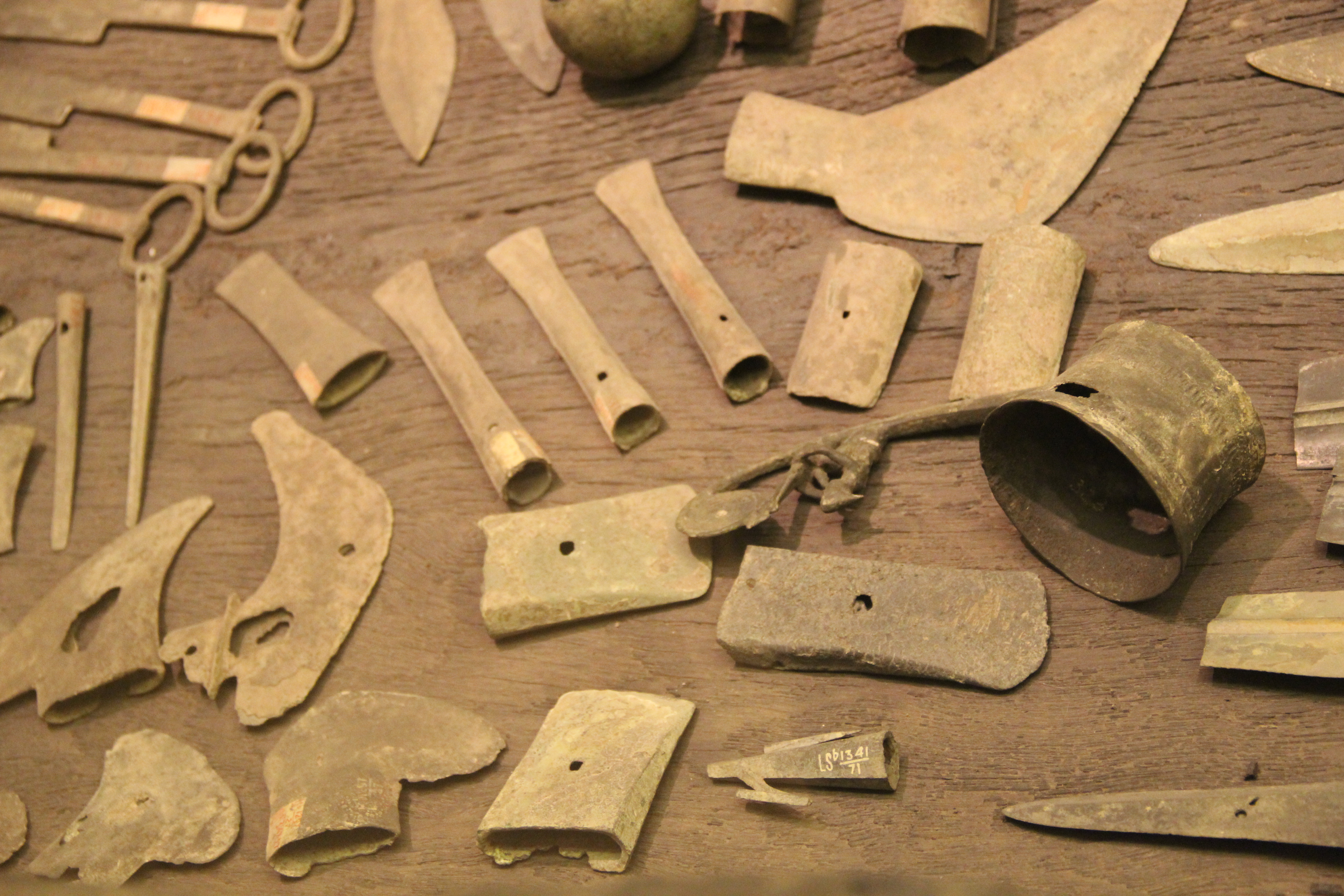
Ornamented ladle (right) and axes with various blades in angle, trapezoid and rectangular shape

The largest coffin was that labelled as burial M2, spanning a length of 4.76 m, but no human remains were found in that coffin. The coffin was made of 1-meter diameter trunk with two ends made of thick planks. It is almost in a shape of a boat. There were 107 grave items including vase, urns, jars, censers, drums, axes, spearheads, chisels, bells, trays and a leather piece. Bronze objects are 90% including urns, vessels, jars, censers, pots, lamps, weapons. It could be said that no other excavation in Vietnam has found such big quantity and multi-type items as much as this Viet Khe coffin.

Thirty-one pediform socketed axes with oval sockers were unearthed, in addition to two symmetrical axes with rectangular sockets and flared blades, and another two axes with blades almost parallel-sided.

The chisels found at the burial site were divided into three varieties of classifications, these being wide, pointed and small-gauge working ended chisels. The pediform axes found at Viet Khe differ from most other specimens of Dong Son culture, because they were plain in appearance and had very sparse ornamental decoration. Although some of the axes were used in woodworking, there were also a range of axes that appeared to be used for the purposes of weaponry.

The archaeologists involved in the excavations classified three types of socketed spearheads, two styles of socketed arrowhead, daggers with blades ranging up to 20 cm long and a sword almost 50 cm long. Four ring-handled knives were uncovered, with a Sinic origin or appearance.

One of the major artefacts uncovered at Viet Khe in terms of aesthetic impact were a set of bronze vessels, known as thap (thạp). These are tall vessels, similar in shape to vases, with slowly tapering sides and strap handles. The largest stands at 37 cm in its current fragmented condition, bearing panels of decorative artwork that combine spiral and geometric motifs. The panel also depicts scenes of plumed warriors travelling on dryland or on water transport associated with both avian and aquatic life.

The tho (thố) is a bronze hemispherical vessel with outward sloping sides standing on a low tripod pedestal, similar to an incense bowl. One of the examples recovered from Viet Khe stands 22.5 cm tall and is decorated with rows of spiral and geometric patterns.

The binh (bình) is a globular vessel, wider on the sides than vertically, standing on a high pedestal similar to a circular base. It has two handles at the top and its lid is decorated with further geometric decorations. One of the examples unearthed was 21 cm in height and 24.7 cm in diameter.

One example of the au (âu), a basin with a handle, supported by a pedestal, was found at Viet Khe. A dinh, a basin supported by three legs, was found, which resembled the li of China. The khay is an artefact not similar to modern implements, consisting of a low tray with large handles, decorated with triangular figures and spiral motifs. An am found in the excavation, a rounded vessel with a spout resembling that of a kettle, was undecorated and damaged.

A set of ornamented bronze ladles (muôi) were also unearthed, all of approximately 20 cm long. One was decorated with depictions of flying birds and geometric patterns, while another showed a picture of a man playing music. The circular motifs in the artefacts excavated at Viet Khe were not restricted to the bronze specimens, with a piece of leather also being ornamented in this way. The coffins also held wooden hafts for use in speartips, impressions of matting on soil and items of lacquer, cloth and basketry.

== Musical instruments ==
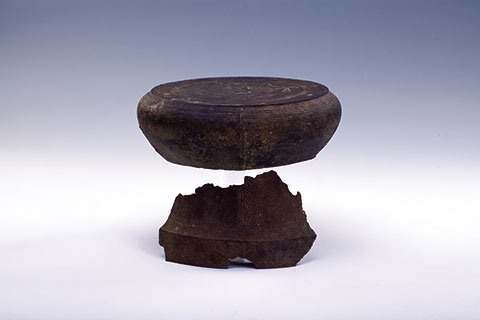
Bronze drum found in Viet Khe tomb

On the musical front, a small drum was found, with a tympanum 23 cm wide showing the design of a central-rayed solar body, enveloped by four birds in flight. On a part of the mantle remains in existence, which contains artwork of a bird within a panel whose boundary is denoted by decorated circular bands. A set of musical bells was also found; some were decorated with local Dong Son artforms while others showed Chinese influences.

== Dating and analysis ==
Three radiocarbon dating figures have been ascertained from the coffin wood at Viet Khe. Taking into account the possibility that already long dead trees were used for constructing the coffins, archaeologists have estimated the age of the Viet Khe artefacts to be between 300 BCE and 500 BCE, which would place the Viet Khe site among the earlier of the Dong Son burial sites.

This is consistent with the impressions of the specimens by the archaeologists, who noted that despite the large quantity of material, they specimens were generally not intricately decorated, nor was the drum particularly large or detailed in its artwork. The burial site also had little trace of iron, which succeeded the Bronze Age.

Some of the finds also parallel the objects unearthed in Lingnan in southern China, notably, the dinh tripod, the ring-ended paring knife and the bronze sword, as well as the heads of some arrows and spears. These objects are also found at tonggugang in Guangdong and Yinshangling in Guangxi in southern China, sites that were dated to the Warring States period.
