= Red Stone Gorge =

Gorge in Yulin, Shaanxi, China

Coordinates: 38°20′01″N 109°43′08″E

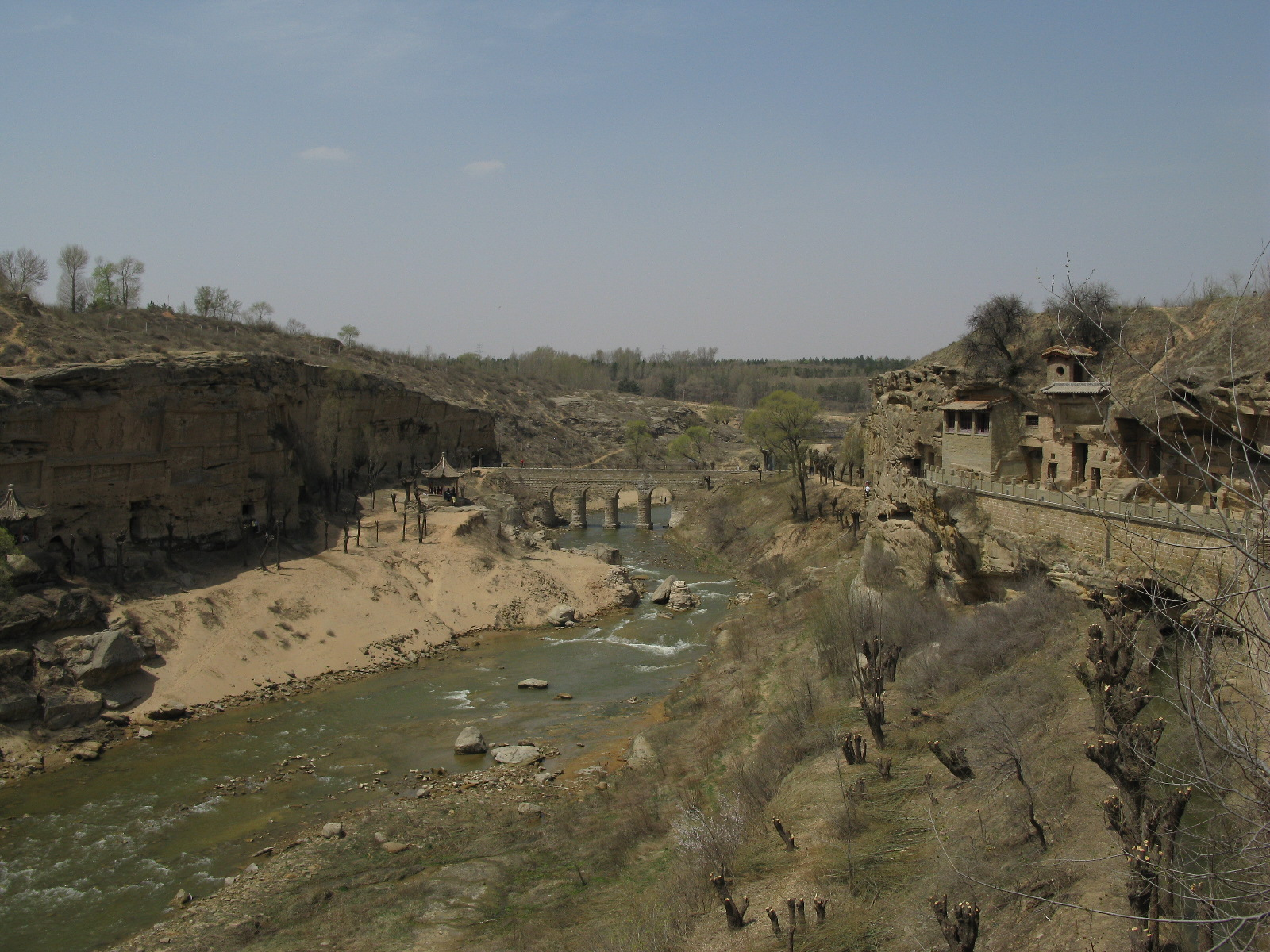
Wide view of Red Stone Gorge.

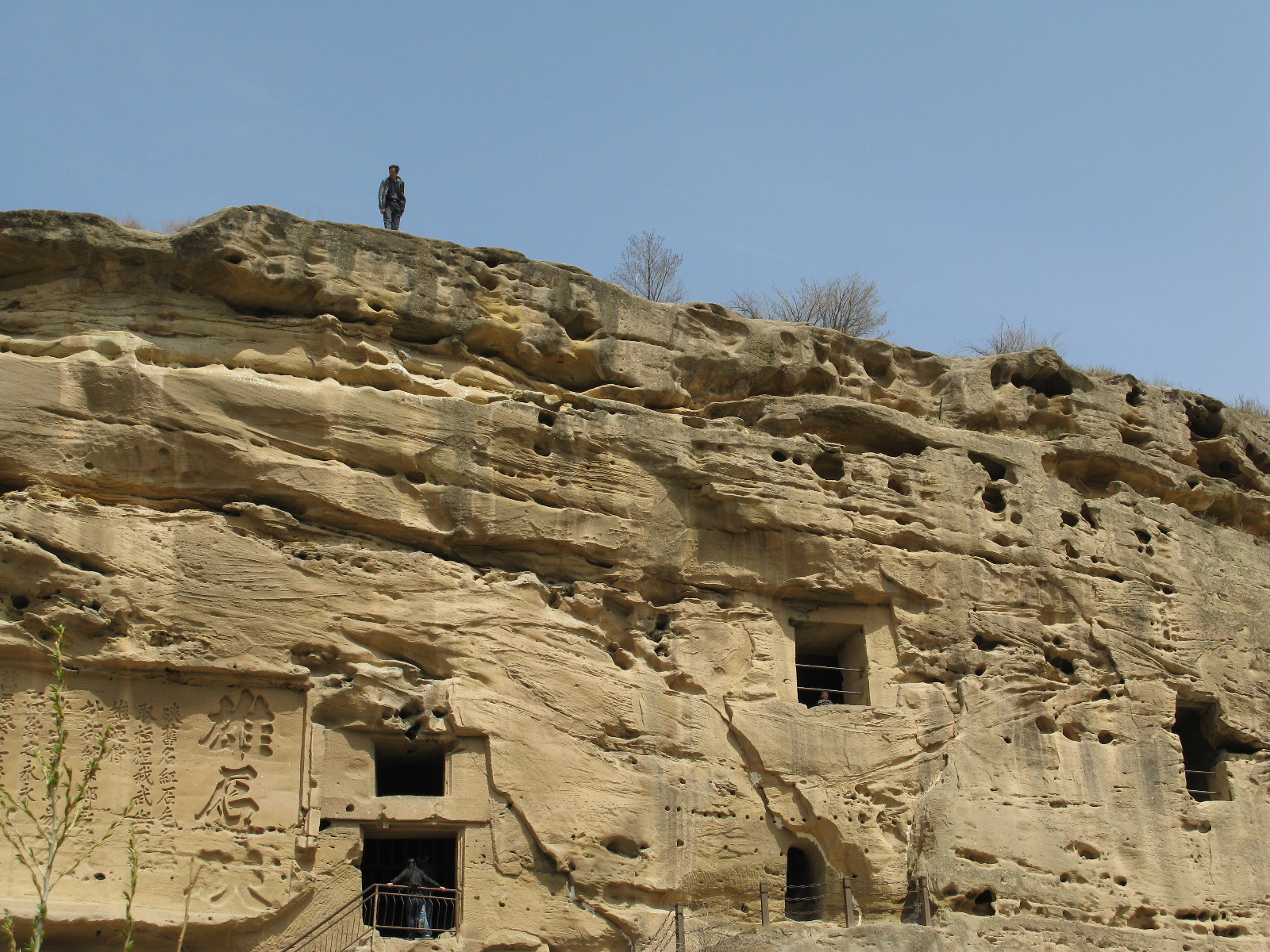

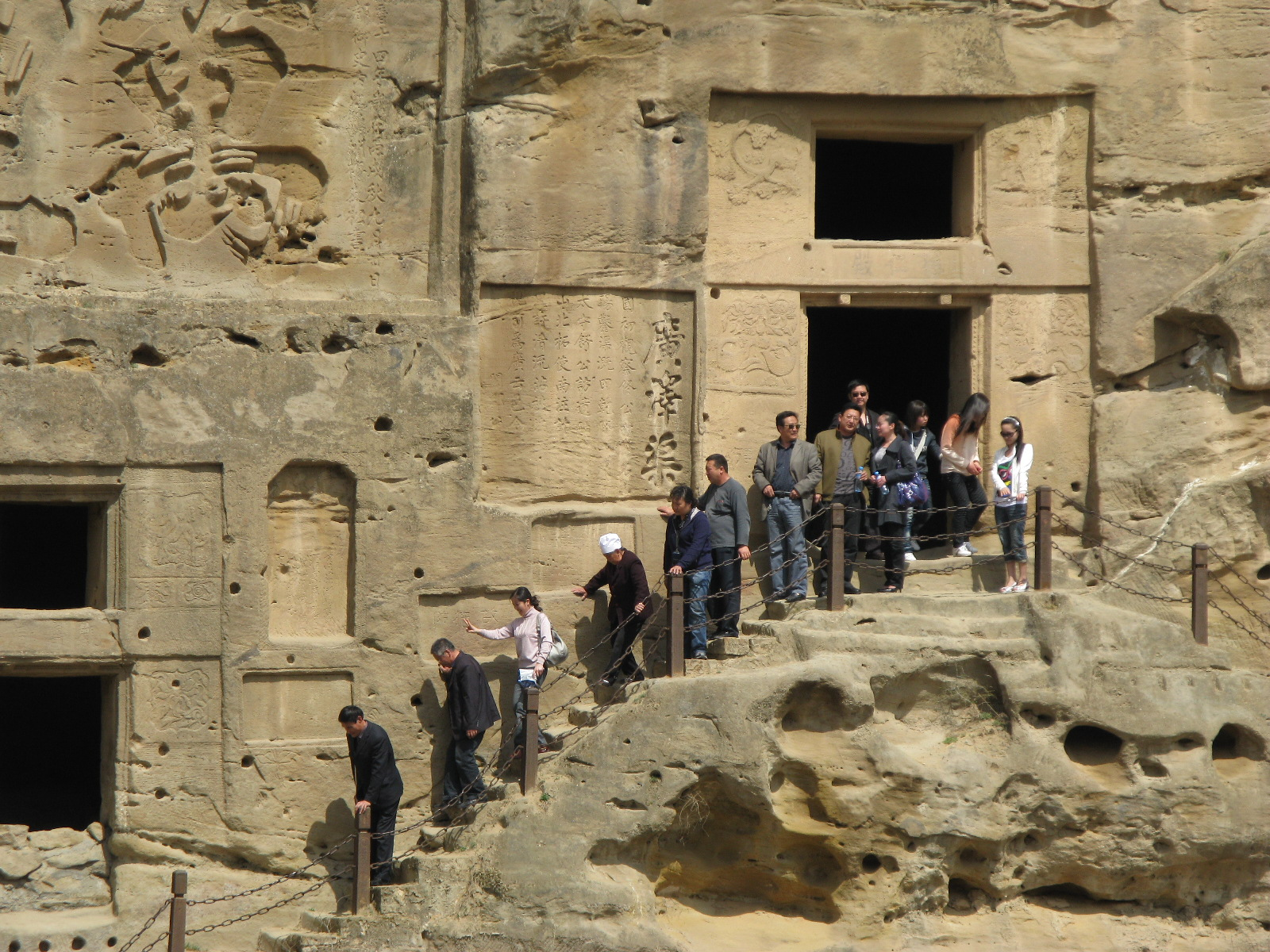

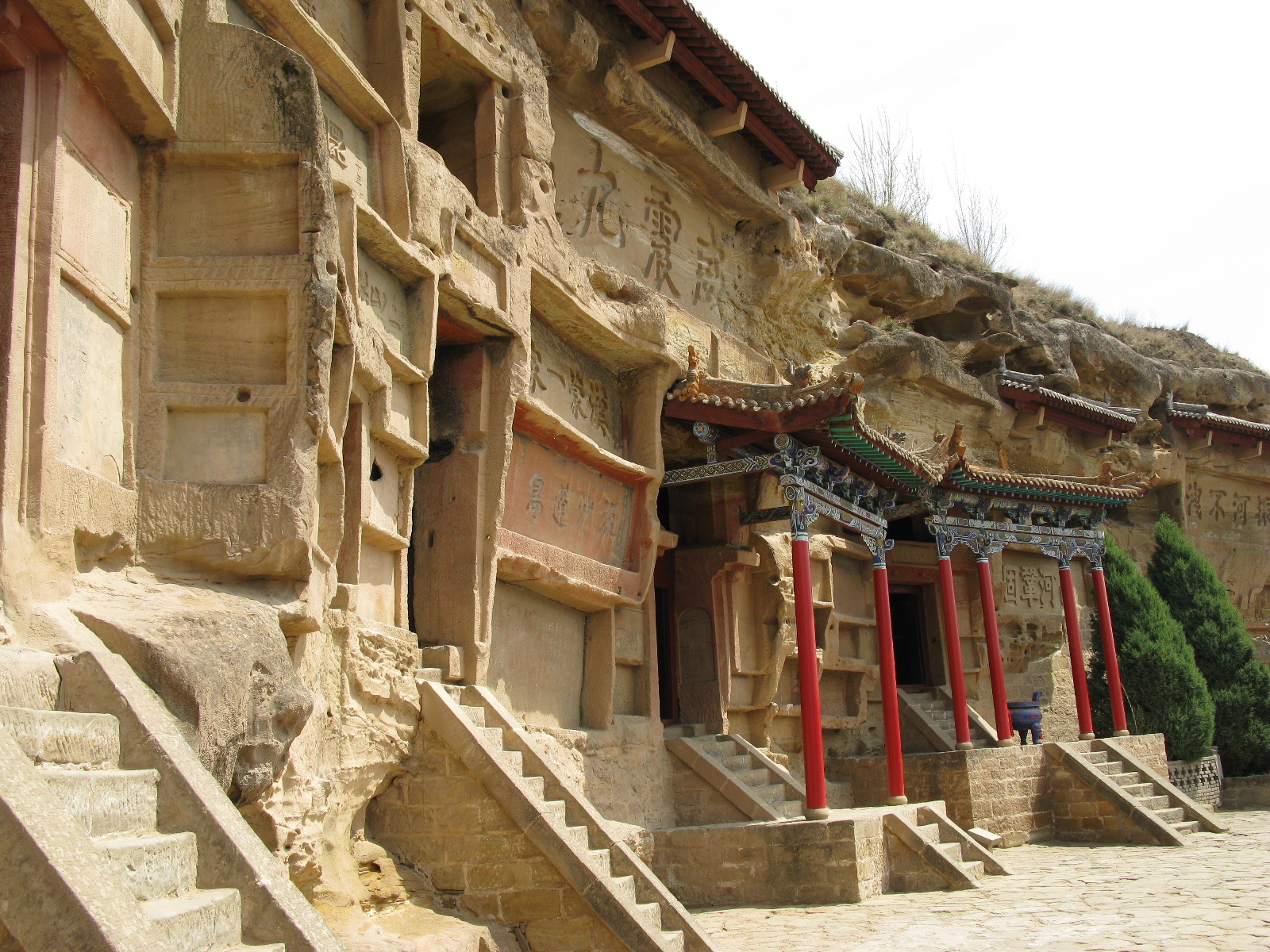

Red Stone Gorge (Jin Chinese: 紅石峽, [xwəŋ˧ ʂəʔ˨˩˧ ɕjɑʔ˧]; Mandarin pinyin: Hóngshíxiá) is a gorge and attraction in Yulin, Shaanxi, China featuring 200 sandstone cliff inscriptions and 34 rock-cut grottos with Buddhist clay statues in the grottoes. The inscriptions dated from 1587 to 1949, all are in Classical Chinese except one in Manchu. Most Buddhist clay statues were destroyed in the Four Olds Destruction movement from 1966 to 1976. The currently displayed statues are mostly reconstructed models.
