= Phật Tích Temple =

Buddhist temple in Vietnam

Coordinates: 21.0965°N 106.0244°E

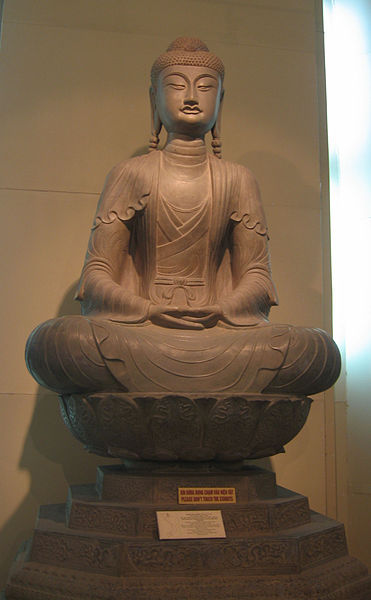
Replica of a Buddha statue at the Temple

Phật Tích Temple (Vietnamese: Chùa Phật Tích, Chữ Hán: 佛跡寺, literally the Temple of Buddhist Relics) is a Buddhist temple located in the south of Phat Tich mountain, Tiên Du District, Bac Ninh Province, Vietnam. This is an important listed cultural site of Vietnam. It was built in 1057 by king Lý Thánh Tông.
