= National treasure =

Part of the language of romantic nationalism

A national treasure is a structure, artifact, object, cultural work or significant person that is officially or popularly recognized as having particular value to the nation, or representing the ideals of the nation. The term has also been applied to individuals or fictional characters who have made particularly outstanding contributions to the nation's identity.

== Common categories of national treasures ==
Structures: Architectural or natural features of great significance can be designated as national treasures, such as the Great Wall of China (though officially a UNESCO world heritage site, it is often popularly referred to as a national treasure of China). Route 66, in the United States, is often described as a national treasure due to its historical significance.

Hikone Castle (彦根城) is one of five Japanese castles officially designated as a Japanese National Treasure.

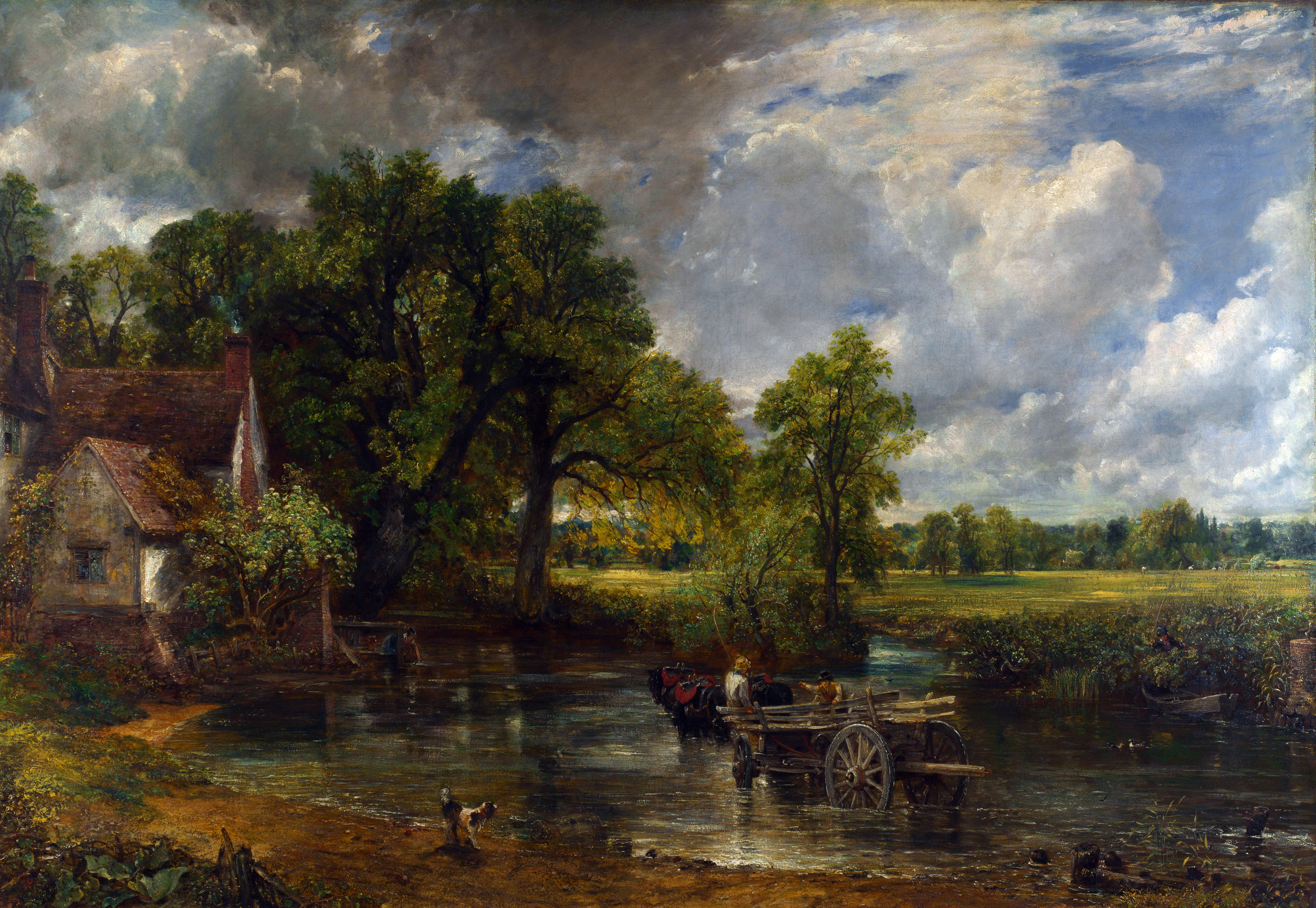
The Hay Wain (1821) by John Constable, was named one of 12 national treasures exhibited in 2024 by the National Gallery, London

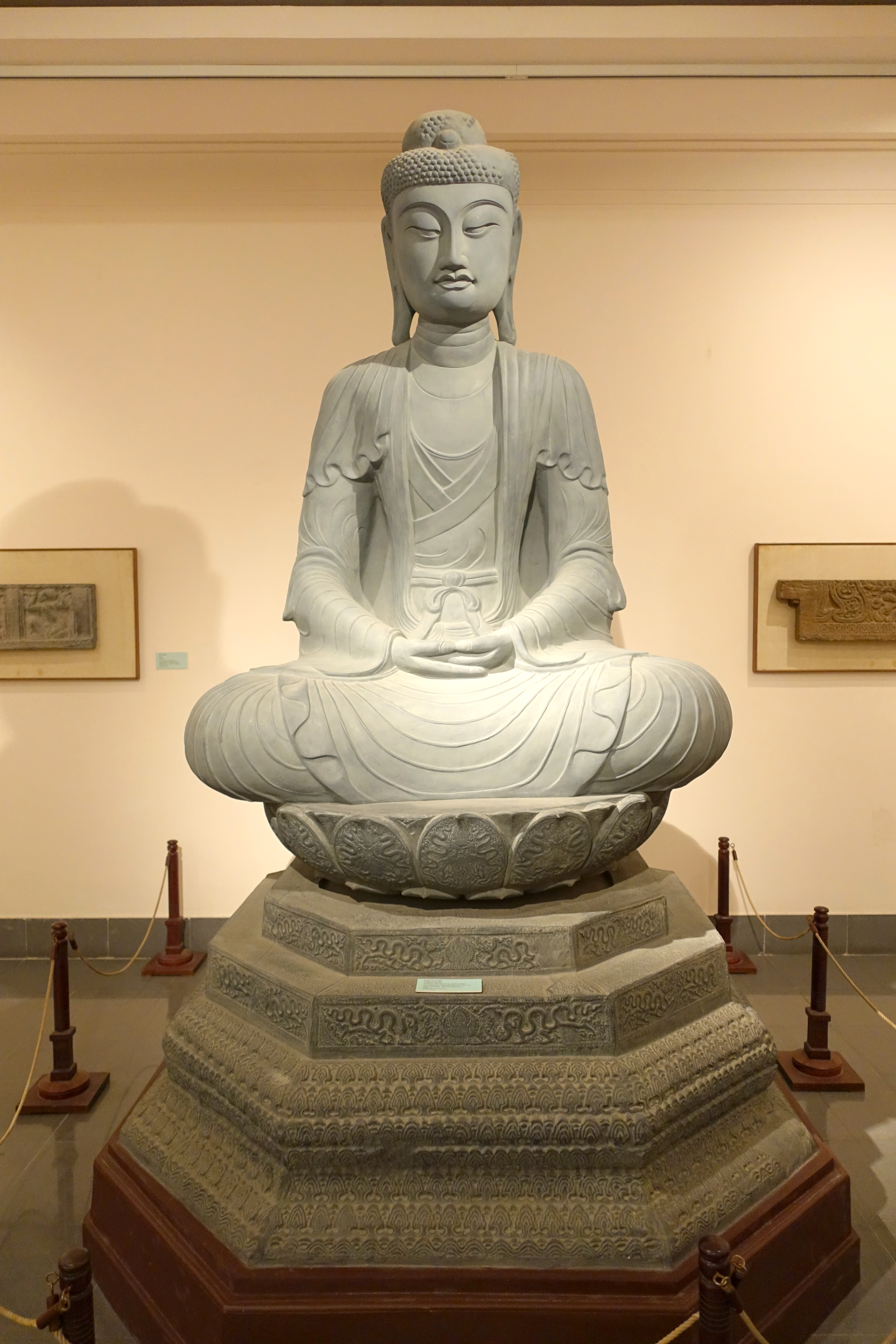
The Amitabha Buddha, housed in the Vietnam National Museum of Fine Arts in Hanoi, is officially classified as a National Treasure of Vietnam

Artifacts: Objects of historical and artistic value to a nation are often classified as national treasures. Examples include the Rosetta Stone, in the British Museum, the Sword of Goujian, in the Hubei Provincial Museum in China, and the United States Declaration of Independence in Washington, DC.

Art and Literature: Some nations formally recognize and number works of art and literature as national treasures. The Portrait of Gongjae Yun Tusŏ by Yun Tusŏ is catalogued as National Treasure No. 240 in South Korea, because of its unique style and influence on Korean portraiture.

People: Somewhat controversially, many individuals are popularly referred to as national treasures. These individuals are often designated as "Living Treasures", sometimes officially, by their home country. Japan and the Philippines award individuals with the "Living Treasure" title, for significant positive contributions to culture.

Characters: Though rarer than other categories, occasionally a fictional character will be officially or popularly designated as a national treasure. For instance, the character Mister Rogers, played by Fred Rogers is commonly recognized as a cultural icon and national treasure and as a symbol of kindness.

== Legal definitions by country ==
Japan: The Agency for Cultural Affairs keeps an extensive list of objects deemed Japanese National Treasures, including temples, shrines, residences, documents, crafts, paintings, and sculptures.

France: Cultural goods deemed French National Treasures are controlled by a commission made up of French museum directors and directors of the French Archives and Culture ministry, among others.

South Korea: Korean National Treasures are designated by Korean states, and defined as tangible cultural heritage with "significant value in terms of human culture".

United Kingdom: Objects are designated as a National Treasure if their removal from the UK would be unfortunate for the reasons outlined in the Waverley Criteria: Close connection with UK history and national life, outstanding aesthetic importance, and outstanding scholarly significance in art, learning or history.

United States: The National Trust for Historic Preservation, a non-profit organization, maintains a list of American National Treasures, and leads several projects to promote tourism and preserve sites.

== National treasures by country ==
=== Asia ===
- National Treasures of Japan
- National Treasures of North Korea
- National Treasures of South Korea
- List of National Cultural Treasures in the Philippines
- National Treasures of Vietnam

=== Europe ===
- National treasure of France

== See also ==
- Monument
- List of Chinese cultural relics forbidden to be exhibited abroad
- National epic
- National poet
- National Anthem
- UNESCO
- National Parks
- Historic Districts
