= Nguyễn Sáng =

Vietnamese painter

Nguyễn Sáng (1923, in Tien Giang Province – 1988, in Ho Chi Minh City) was a Vietnamese painter. He was a graduate of the 1940–1945 class of the Ecole des Beaux-Arts de l'Indochine. His favorite medias were pumice lacquer and oil paint. Although not overtly political, Sáng was reluctant and unenthusiastic about the new communist society in his paintings. He was posthumously awarded the Ho Chi Minh Prize in 1996.

Girls at Hoan Kiem Lake, lacquer on wood

Cats, lacquer

== Works ==
- Self-portrait, 1956
- Portrait of Painter Duong Bich Lien, 1964

Some of his works are in the Vietnam National Museum of Fine Arts, Hanoi.
