= Ho Chi Minh City Museum of History =

- Bảo tàng Lịch sử Thành phố Hồ Chí Minh
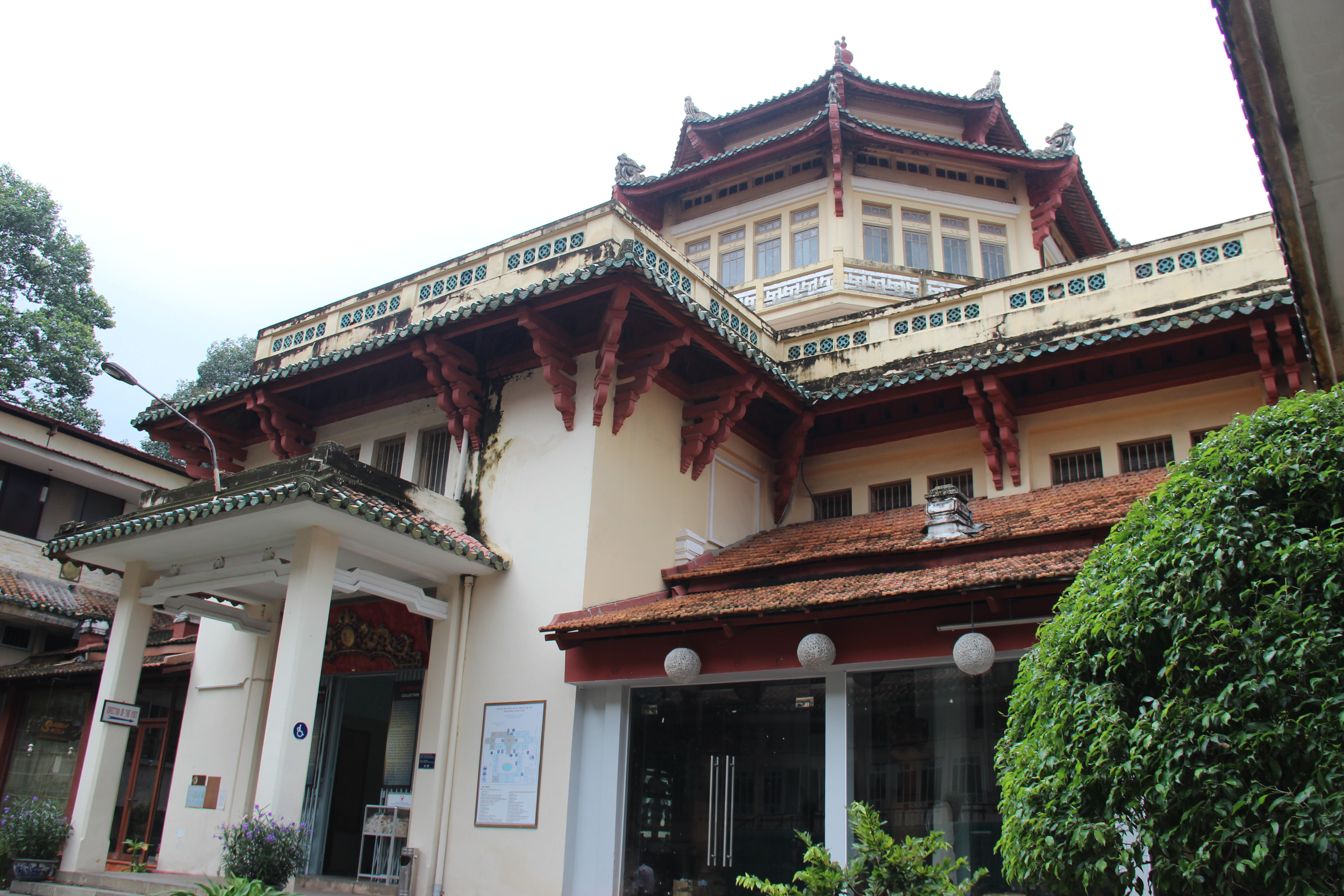
- The Ho Chi Minh City Museum of History in 2013
- Established: 1 January 1929; 97 years ago
- Location: 2 Nguyễn Bỉnh Khiêm, District 1, Ho Chi Minh City, Vietnam
- Coordinates: 10.78484°N 106.70759°E
- Type: History museum
- Website: www.baotanglichsutphcm.com.vn

The Ho Chi Minh City Museum of History is located at 2 Nguyễn Bỉnh Khiêm, Ben Nghe Ward, District 1, in Ho Chi Minh City, Vietnam. Formerly known as the Musée Blanchard de la Brosse, and The National Museum of Vietnam in Saigon, it received its current name in 1979. The museum was designed by French architect Auguste Delaval, and was inaugurated at the same time as the nearby Temple of Hùng King on 1 January 1929. It is a museum showcasing Vietnam's history with exhibits from all periods.

== Exhibits ==
The topics covered by the exhibits include the following:

- Prehistoric period (500,000 years ago to 2879 BC).
- Metal Age (2879–179 BC), including artifacts related to the Dong Son culture of northern Vietnam and the Sa Huỳnh culture of central Vietnam.
- Chinese Domination and Struggle for National Independence in the Red River Valley (179 BC – 938 AD)
- Óc Eo culture of the Mekong Delta region
- Stone and bronze sculptures and other artifacts of Champa
- Stone sculptures of Cambodia (9th–12th centuries)
- Ngô, Dinh, Anterior Lê, Ly dynasties (939–1225)
- Tran and Ho dynasties (1226–1407)
- Dynasties from the Lê to the Nguyên (1428–1788)
- Tây Sơn dynasty (1771–1802)
- Nguyễn dynasty (1802–1945)

== In popular culture ==
The museum served as the pit stop for the second leg of The Amazing Race Asia 3.

== Gallery ==
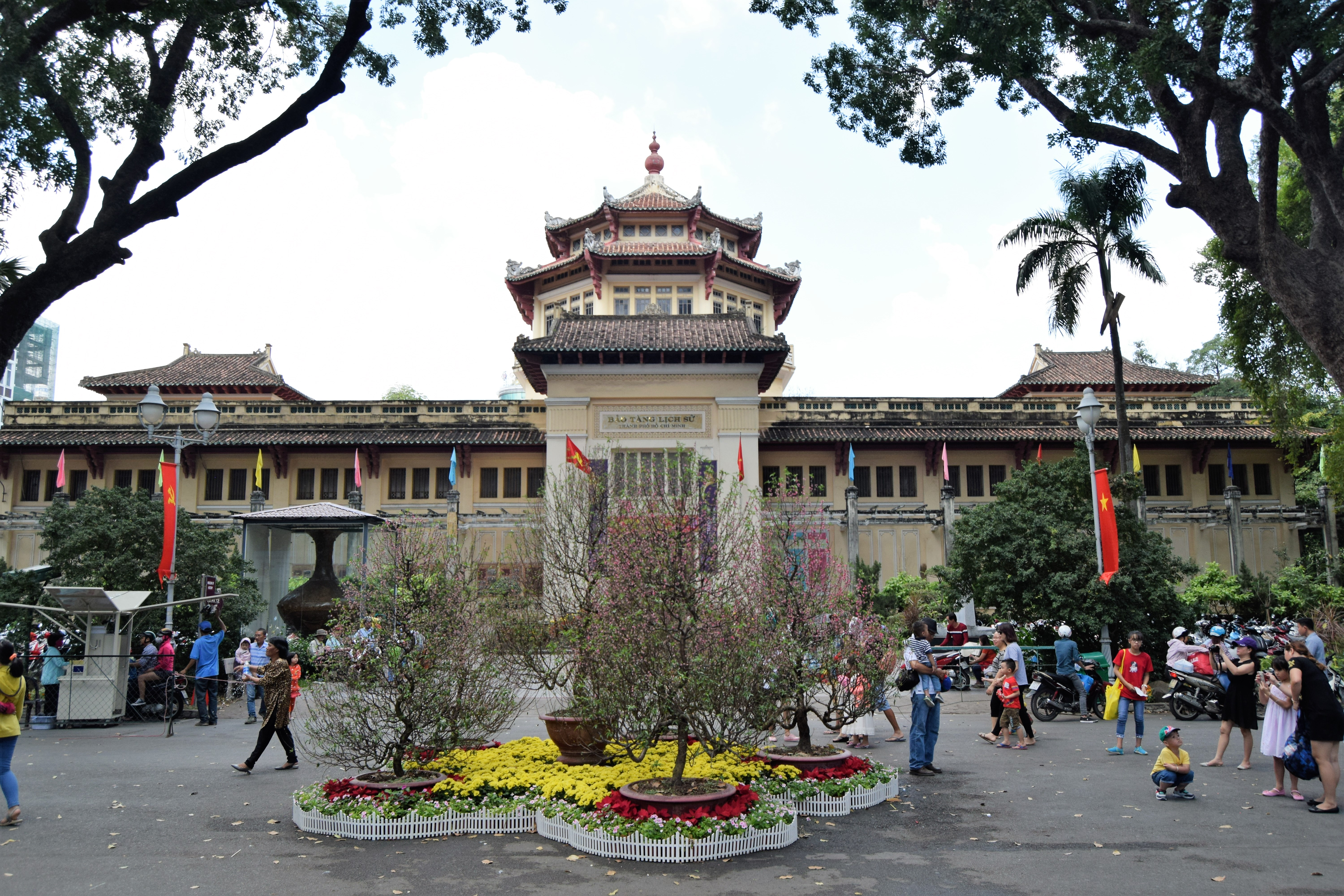
The exterior of the museum.

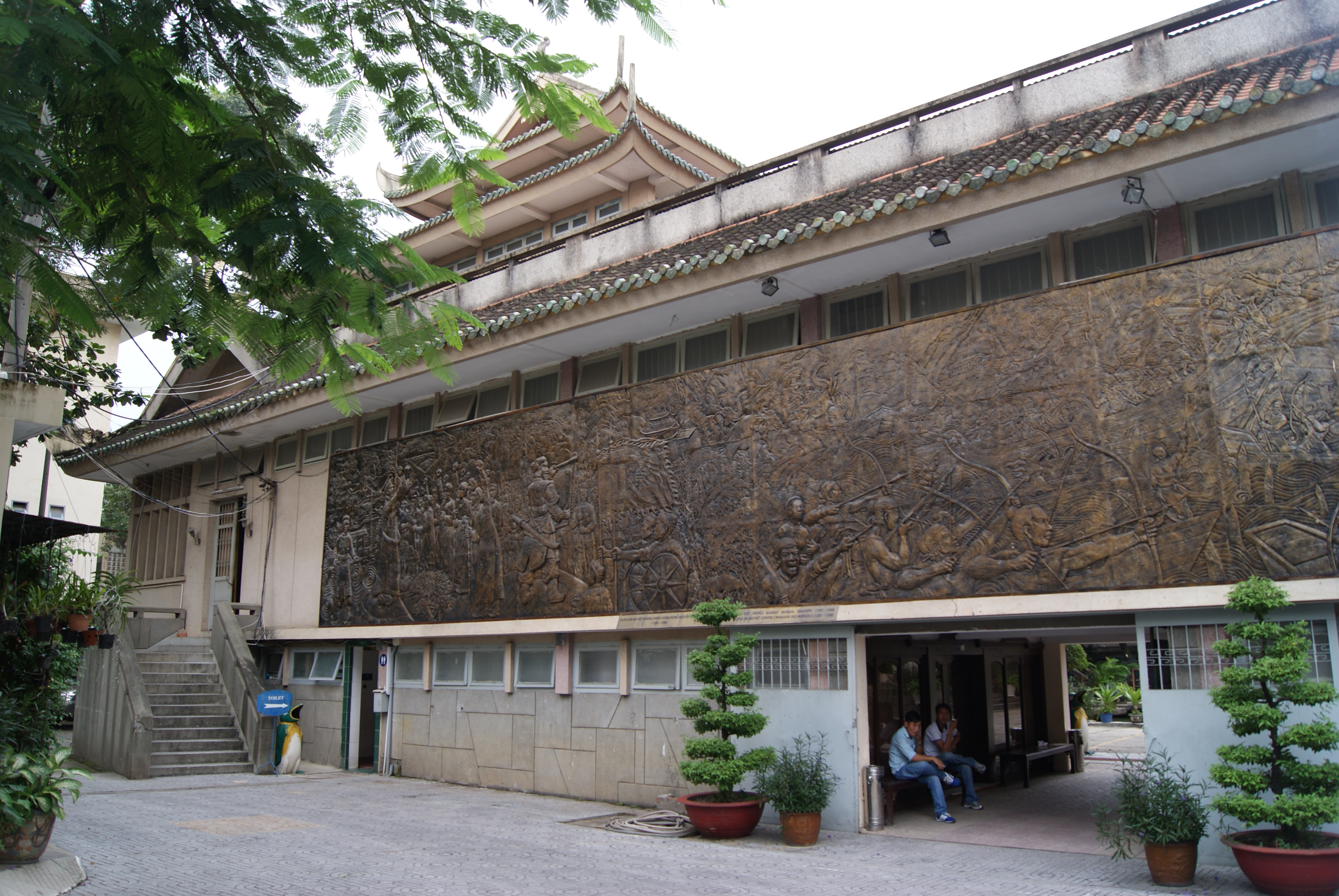
A mural depicting a historical battle in the courtyard.

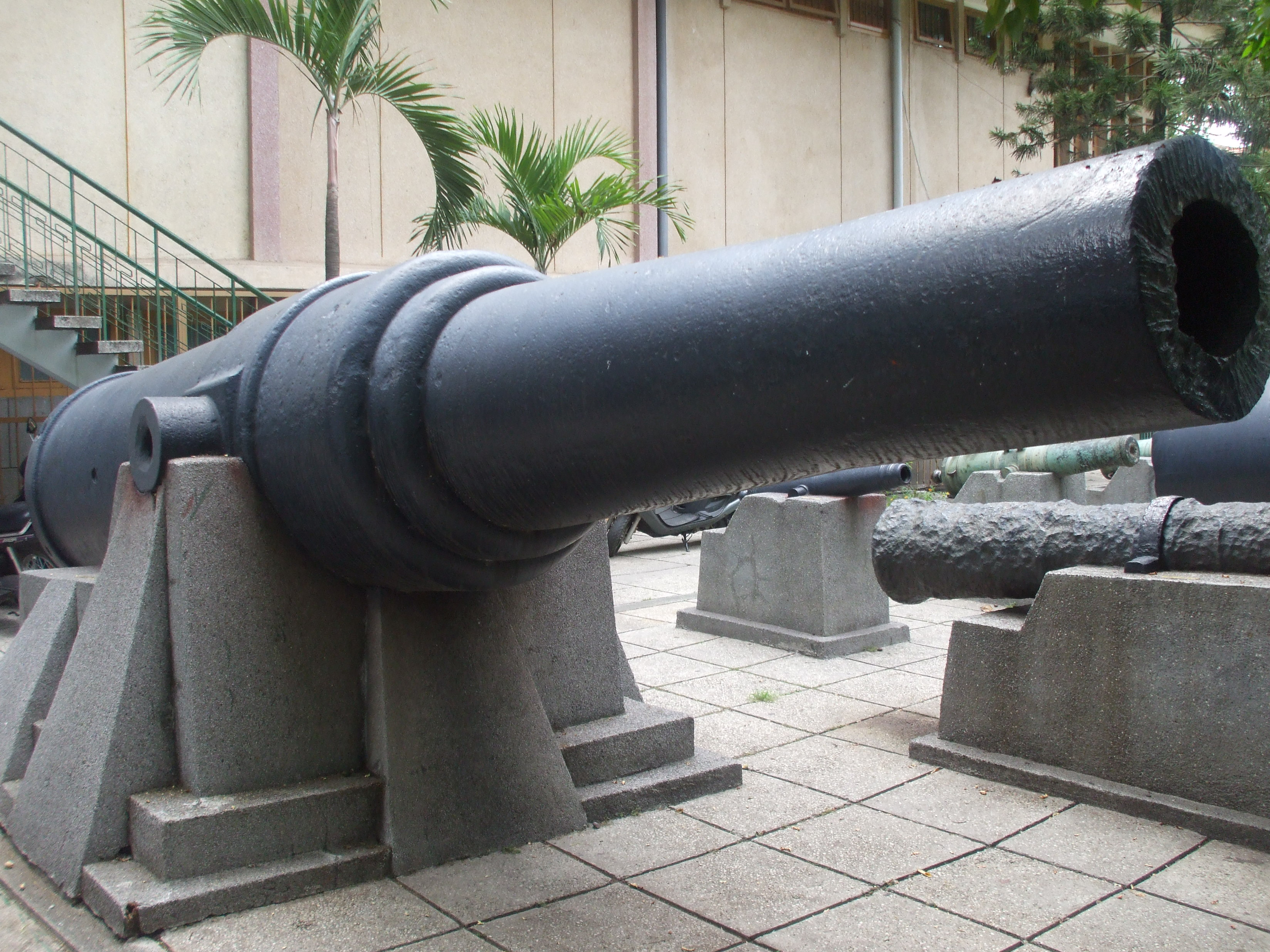
French cannon, cast in 1868, was used to fight the Nguyễn dynasty army during the French conquest of Vietnam.
