= Huế Museum of Royal Fine Arts =

Museum in Vietnam

Coordinates: 16.4713°N 107.5819°E

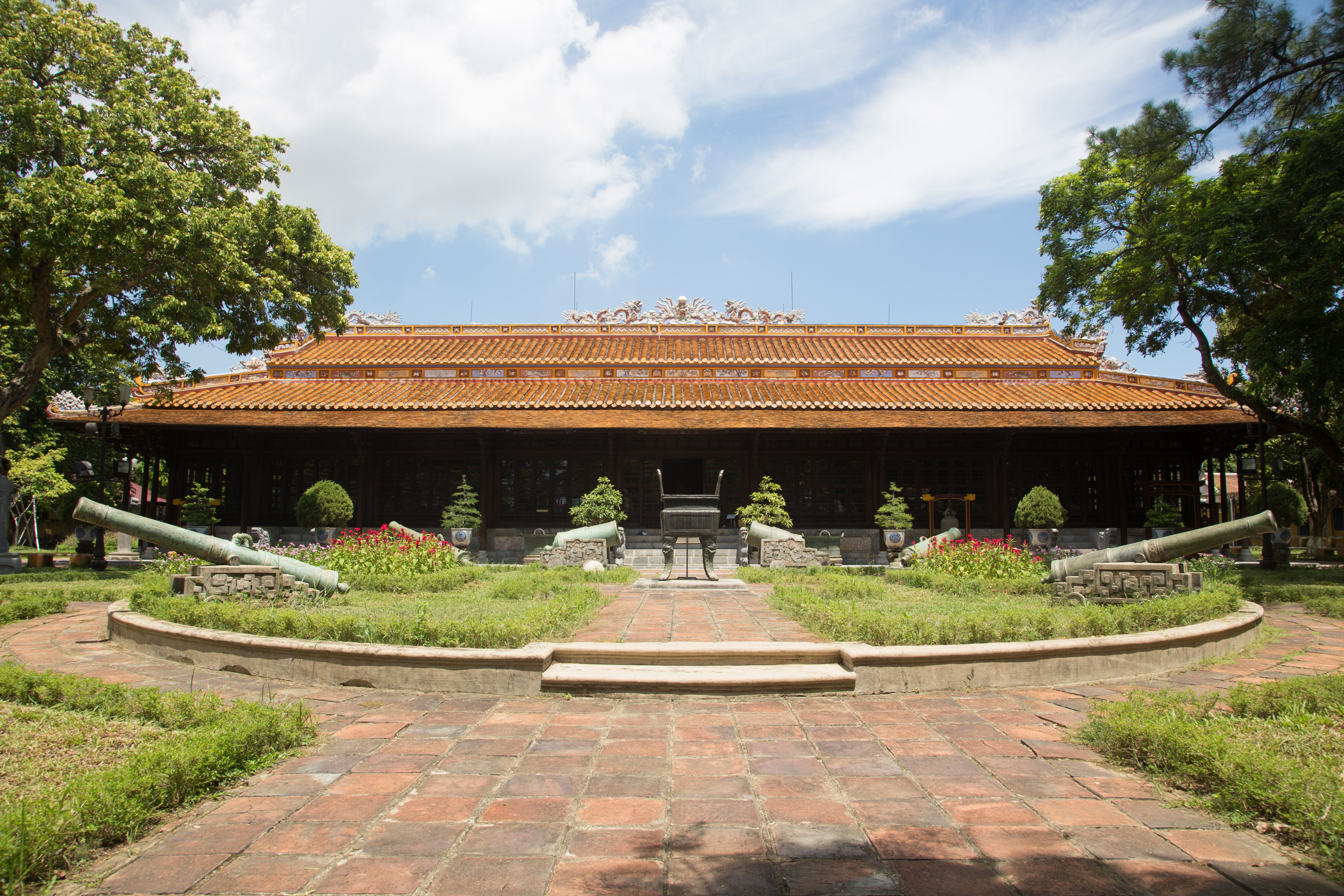
Huế Museum of Royal Fine Arts

The Huế Museum of Royal Fine Arts is a museum dedicated to Vietnam's imperial past and arts of that era. It is located in the former imperial capital of Huế.

By royal decree of 1927, a section for the art of Champa was also instituted. In 2016, an exhibition called "Royal Treasures of the Nguyen dynasty" was shown, with pieces that were moved to Hanoi after 1945 for safekeeping.

== Literature ==
- Lenzi, Iola (2004). Museums of Southeast Asia. Singapore: Archipelago Press. p. 200. ISBN 981-4068-96-9.
