= Living National Treasure =

Living National Treasure or National Living Treasure may refer to:

- Living Human Treasure, a UNESCO designation
- National Living Treasure (Australia)
- Living National Treasure (Japan)
  - List of Living National Treasures of Japan (crafts)
- National Living Treasure (Philippines)
- Living National Treasure (South Korea)
