= Cliff inscriptions =

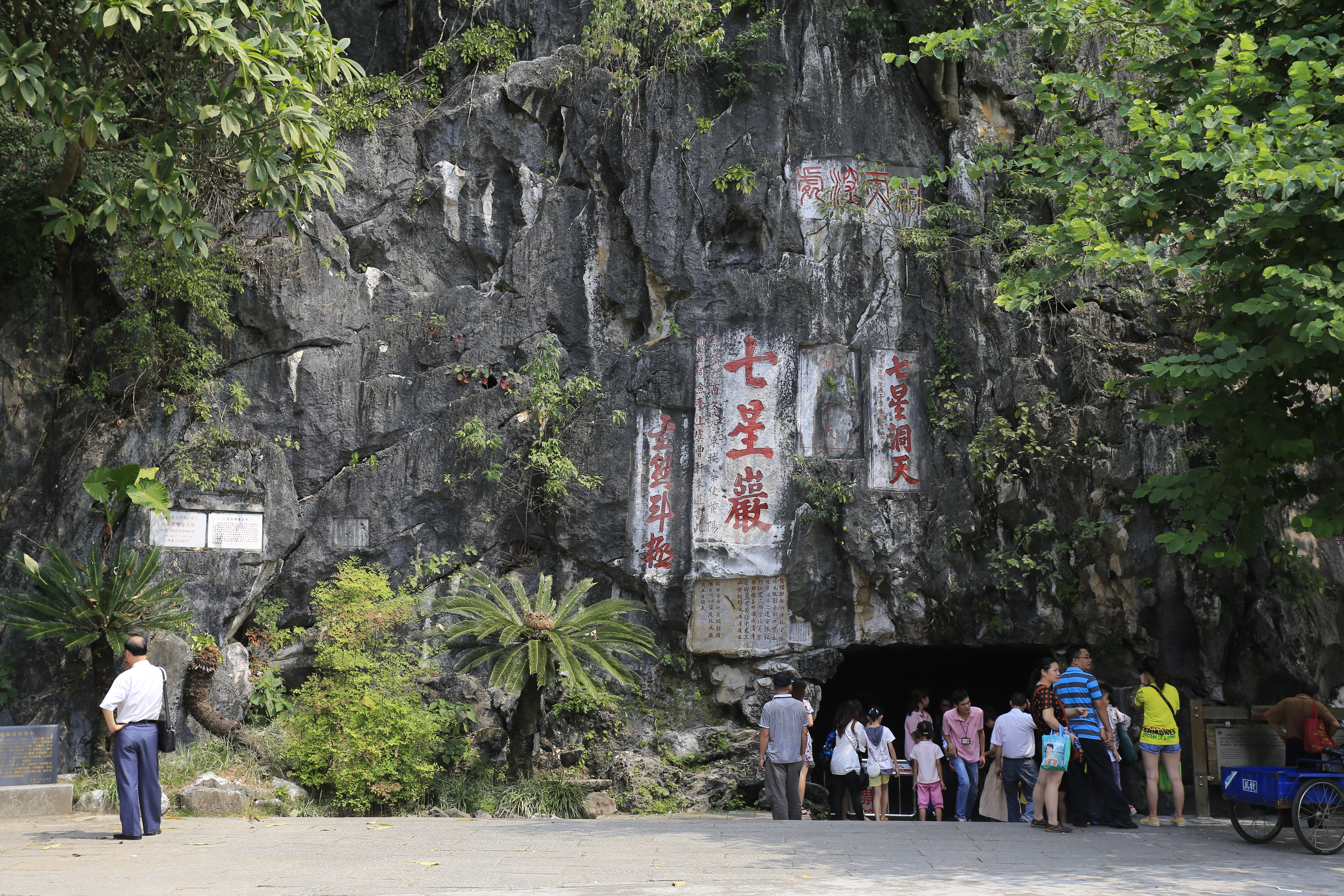
Inscriptions at Qixing Yan, Guangdong

Cliff inscriptions (Chinese: 摩崖石刻; pinyin: mó yá shíkè; lit. 'rub cliff stone-inscription') are inscriptions on mountainsides of Chinese characters, often done by famous people on special occasions or as decorations. They are of tremendous historic importance as both evidence of the presence of certain people, such as famous writers, or events as well as of the Chinese script's regional, temporal, or personal variations. Being in stone they are less prone to destruction than paper and so preserve the time in which they were made offering posterity unique glimpses into the past. Additionally, along with Chinese calligraphy, they are an art form meriting study and part of a highly specialized field within art which requires both skills in calligraphy and stone carving. The methods are likely similar to calligraphy stele or 碑 bēi, such as can be found in Xi'an's Stele Forest.

== See also ==
- Chinese calligraphy
- Petroglyphs
- Stele
