= Tiên Du district =

Coordinates: 21°06′30″N 106°01′30″E

Tiên Du rural district Huyện Tiên Du Võ Ninh châu
- Rural District
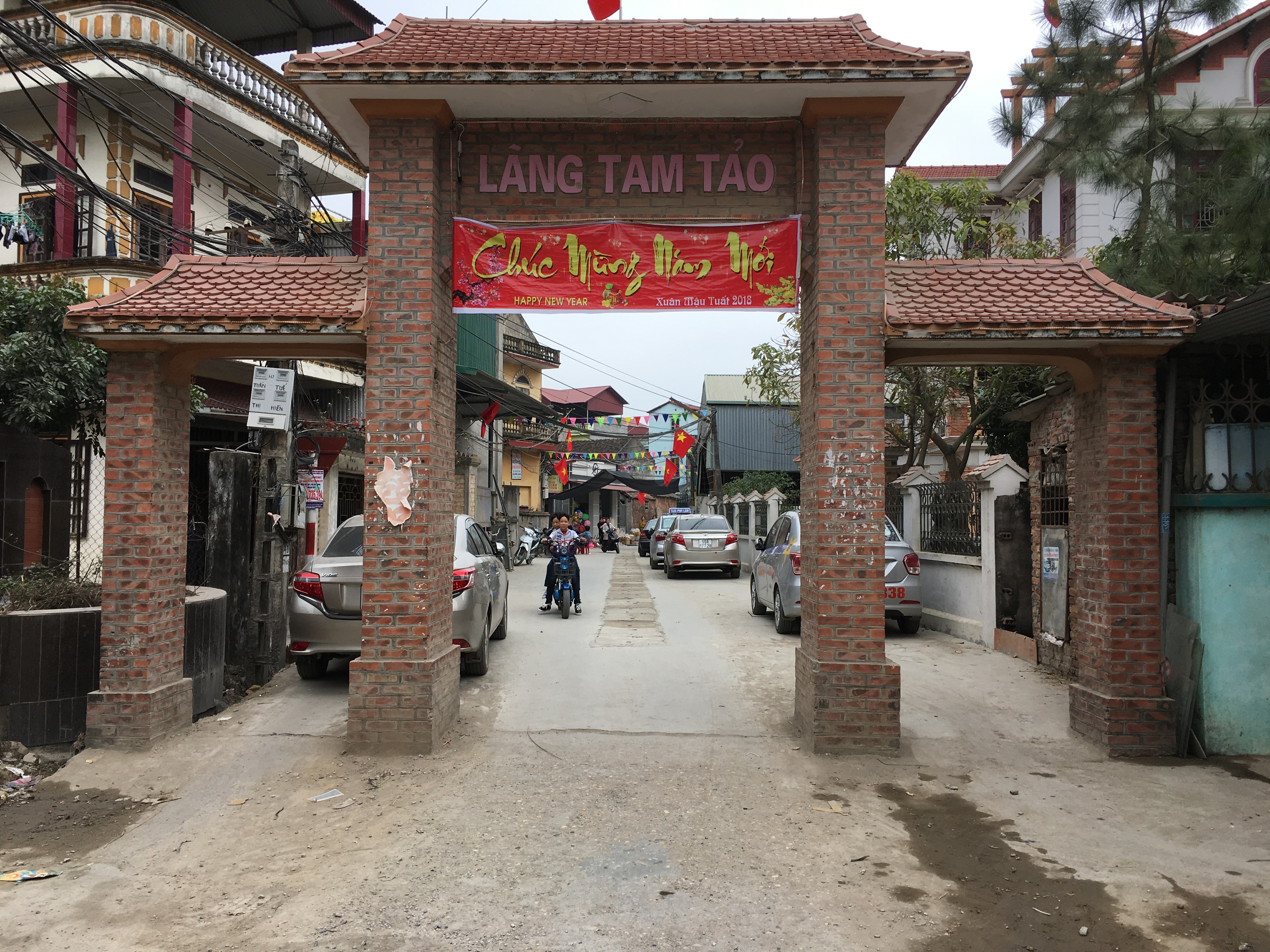
- Tam Tảo village gate.
- Nickname: "Fairyland" (Tiên Hương)
- Interactive map of Tiên Du rural district
- Country: Vietnam
- Region: Red River Delta
- Province: Bắc Ninh
- Existence: 966 to August 30, 2025
- Central hall: No.1, Cộng Hòa road, Lim township

Government
  - Type: Rural district
  - People Committee's Chairman: Nguyễn Đại Đồng
  - People Council's Chairman: Nguyễn Tiến Tài
  - Front Committee's Chairman: Trần Quang Ngân
  - Party Committee's Secretary: Nguyễn Tiến Tài

Area
  - Rural District: 95.6 km^{2} (36.9 sq mi)

Population (2021)
  - Rural District: 195,993
  - Density: 2,049/km^{2} (5,310/sq mi)
  - Urban: 13,575
  - Metro: 182,358
  - Ethnicities: Kinh; Tanka
- Time zone: UTC+7 (Indochina Time)
- ZIP code: 16400 (Note: An official code from December 31, 2022, to August 30, 2025.)
- Website: Tiendu.Bacninh.gov.vn; Tiendu.Bacninh.dcs.vn

Tiên Du [tiən˧˧:zu˧˧] is a former rural district of Bắc Ninh province in the Red River Delta region of Vietnam.

== History ==
As of 2019, the district had a population of 176,460. The district covers an area of 108 km^{2}. The district capital lies at Lim township.

Among local spirits traditionally worshipped is Thái Giám, a eunuch spirit. (Note: Opusculum de Sectis Apud Sinenses Et Tunkinenses -Adriano (di St. Thecla) - 2002 p148 "According to Professor Trần Quốc Vượng, this spirit is worshipped in Tiên Du district of Bắc Ninh province. There are several spirits of the eunuchs famous for their service to different dynasties...)
