= Vietnam National Museum of History =

Archaeological museum in Hanoi, Vietnam

- Bảo tàng Lịch sử Việt Nam
- Established: September 3, 1958; 68 years ago
- Location: Trang Tien street, Hoan Kiem, Hanoi, Vietnam
- Coordinates: 21°01′29″N 105°51′35″E
- Type: National museum
- Collection size: Vietnamese history
- Director: Nguyễn Văn Cường
- Public transit access: Bus, automobile, motorcycle, underbone
- Website: baotanglichsu.vn

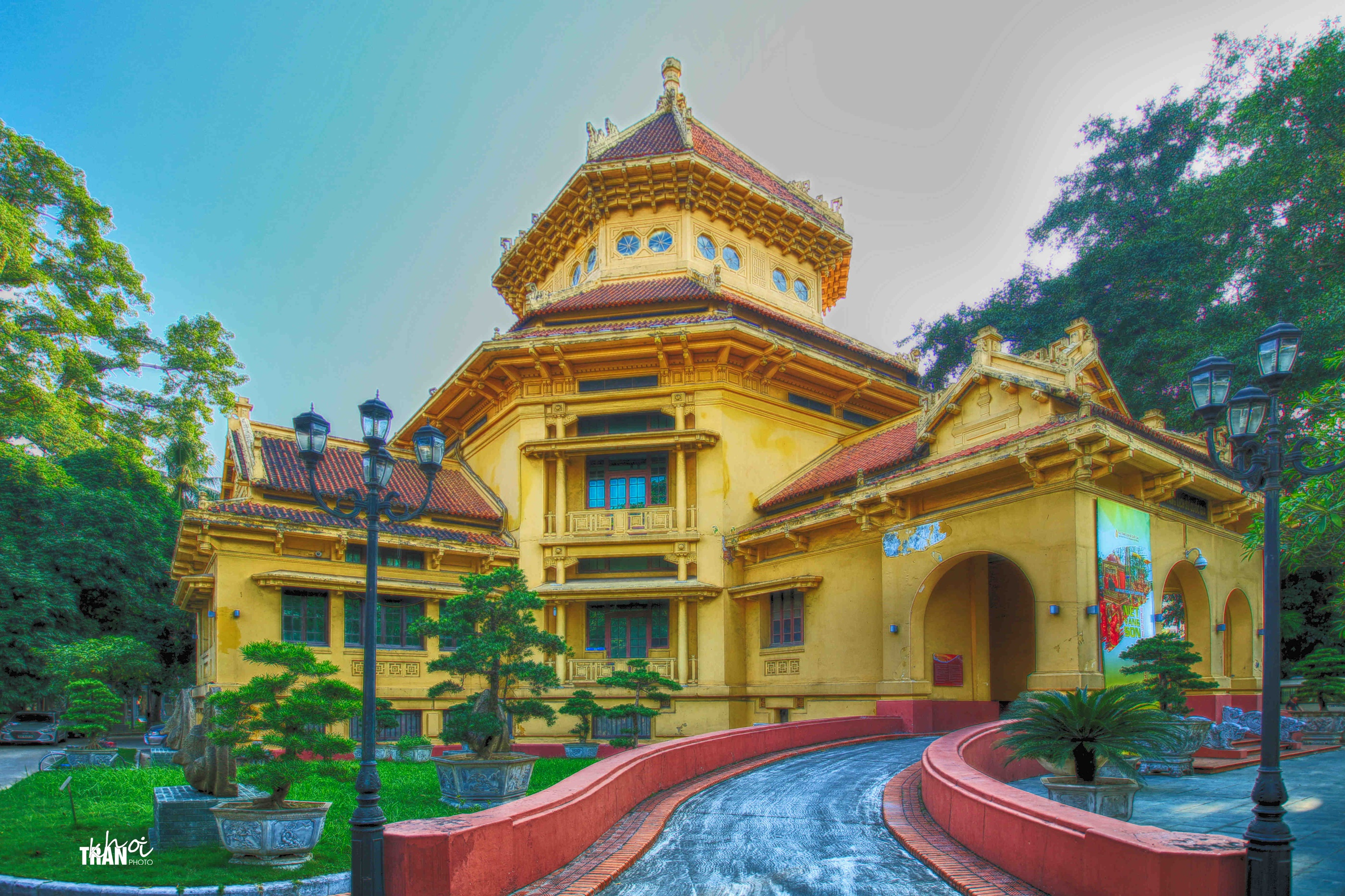
Front entrance

The Vietnam National Museum of History (Vietnamese: Viện Bảo tàng Lịch sử Việt Nam; French: Musée National d'Histoire du Viêt Nam) is in the Hoan Kiem district of Hanoi, Vietnam. The museum building was originally a museum of the French School of the Far East during French colonial rule. It was acquired by the government of North Vietnam (Note: Prior to 1975, Vietnam was divided into two states, the Democratic Republic of Vietnam (called "North Vietnam") and the Republic of Viet Nam (called "South Vietnam").) in 1958 and the collections were expanded to cover eastern arts and national history.

The museum highlights Vietnam's prehistory (roughly 40,000 years ago to 3,000 years ago) up to the August 1945 Revolution and the founding of the Democratic Republic of Vietnam. Its collections have over 200,000 items, arranged in four major sections.

== Location ==
The museum is at the back of the Hanoi Opera House. It is on 1 Trang Tien Street, 216 Tran Quang Khai Street, Hanoi.

== History ==
The museum building used to be the Musée Louis-Finot, a branch of the French School of the Far East during French colonial rule. It opened in 1910 and was extensively refurbished in 1920,, and again redesigned between 1925 and 1932 by the architects Ernest Hébrard and Charles Batteur. It is considered a blend of French colonial and traditional Vietnamese architecture, called "style Indochinois." After being acquired by the government of North Vietnam in 1958, it was formally opened for public viewing on 3 September 1958.

== Features ==
The museum is shaped like a pagoda with a cupola, and incorporates double walls and balconies for a natural ventilation system and protection from sunshine. The exhibition area is more than 2,200 square metres (24,000 sq ft) with exhibits arranged chronologically. It is divided into four major sections: Section 1 covers the period from the Stone Age (40,000 years to 4,000 years ago); Section 2 has displays from the time of nation building during the Tran dynasty; Section 3 has exhibits from the period of the Ho dynasty to the August 1945 Revolution; and Section 4 showcases Champa stone sculptures. The museum showcases Vietnam's history with a very large collection of about 200,000 items, covering the Neolithic age, Bronze Age, Sa Huỳnh, Oc Eo, and Hung periods, Nguyễn dynasty, Cham period, and also northern Vietnam's Đông Sơn, a culture which existed about 1000 BC-100 AD. These exhibits are in the main building. The exhibits highlight communism and depict the rule of the French colonists as cruel.

== Exhibits ==
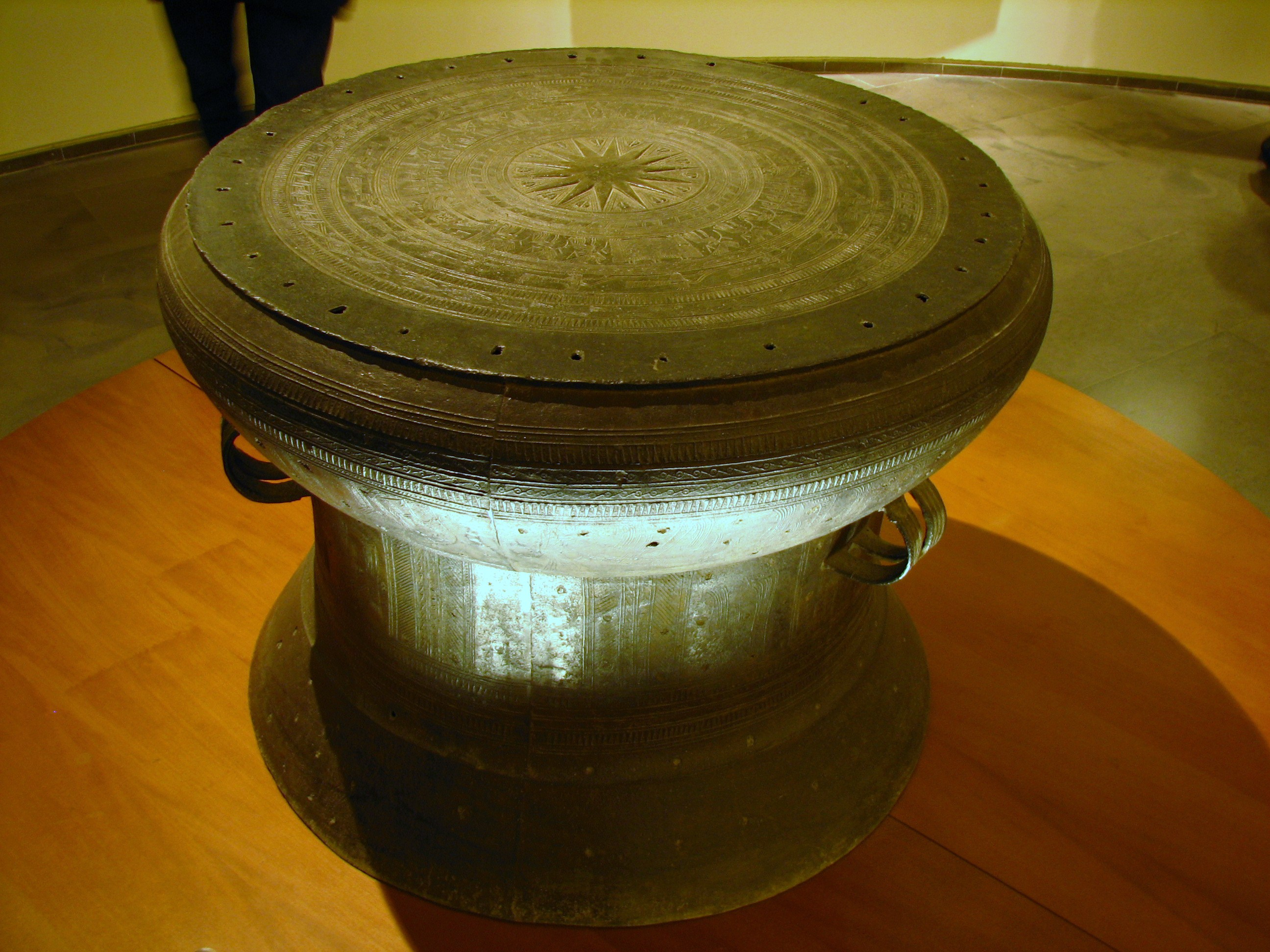
A Đông Sơn bronze drum, c.800 BC.

Exhibits in the museum include Hung era and Neolithic mortuaries, Bronze Age implements such as axe heads, and Cham period artifacts. There is an intimidating sculpture of Quan Am, the Goddess of Mercy, which has 1,000 eyes and arms. Also on display are the 13 Nguyễn dynasty emperor's ornamented throne, dresses and other antiquities. These include the large Đông Sơn drums, which are symbolic of Vietnamese culture. At ground level the display consist of stone implements, pottery, and ornaments, up to 1400 AD. On the first floor the exhibits pertain to the monarchic reign from the time of the Dinh and Le eras of 900 ADs to Vietnam's last emperors; these are decorative items such as a chest of drawers inlaid with mother-of-pearl, cylindrical containers of enamel (these are funerary jars), ceramics and bright lacquer ware. There is a stele which was found during an archaeological excavation with an inscription at a monument labeled G1, which is dedicated to God Harivamsesvara by Harivarman I (ca. 1137). The exhibits of new artifacts cover Central Vietnam, Central Highlands, South Vietnam and also an old shipwreck near Cu Lao Cham Island. The museum has signage in English, but this is inadequate to express all that is on display in the museum.

To popularize Vietnam's history from the past to the present, the museum administration organized an exhibition of 450 artifacts (416 from 13 Vietnamese museums and the balance from 8 European museums) in Austria and Belgium from September 2003 to November 2004. The Royal Museum of Arts and History (Kingdom of Belgium) and the Vienna Ethnology Museum (Republic of Austria) were associated with this exhibition, which was titled "Vietnam – Past and Present."

== Bibliography ==
- Black, Jeremy (2014). Contesting History: Narratives of Public History. A&C Black. ISBN 978-1-4725-1952-8.
- Filek-Gibson, Dana (2015). Moon Vietnam. Avalon Travel Publishing. ISBN 978-1-61238-891-5.
- Guides, Insight (2015). Insight Guides: Vietnam. Guides Insight. ISBN 978-1-78005-537-4.
- Hardy, Andrew David; Cucarzi, Mauro i; Zolese, Patrizia (2009). Champa and the Archaeology of Mỹ Sơn (Vietnam). NUS Press. ISBN 978-9971-69-451-7.
- Lenzi, Iola (2004). Museums of Southeast Asia. Archipelago Press. ISBN 978-981-4068-96-3.
