= Yang Prong Tower =

Ruins of Hindu temple in Vietnam

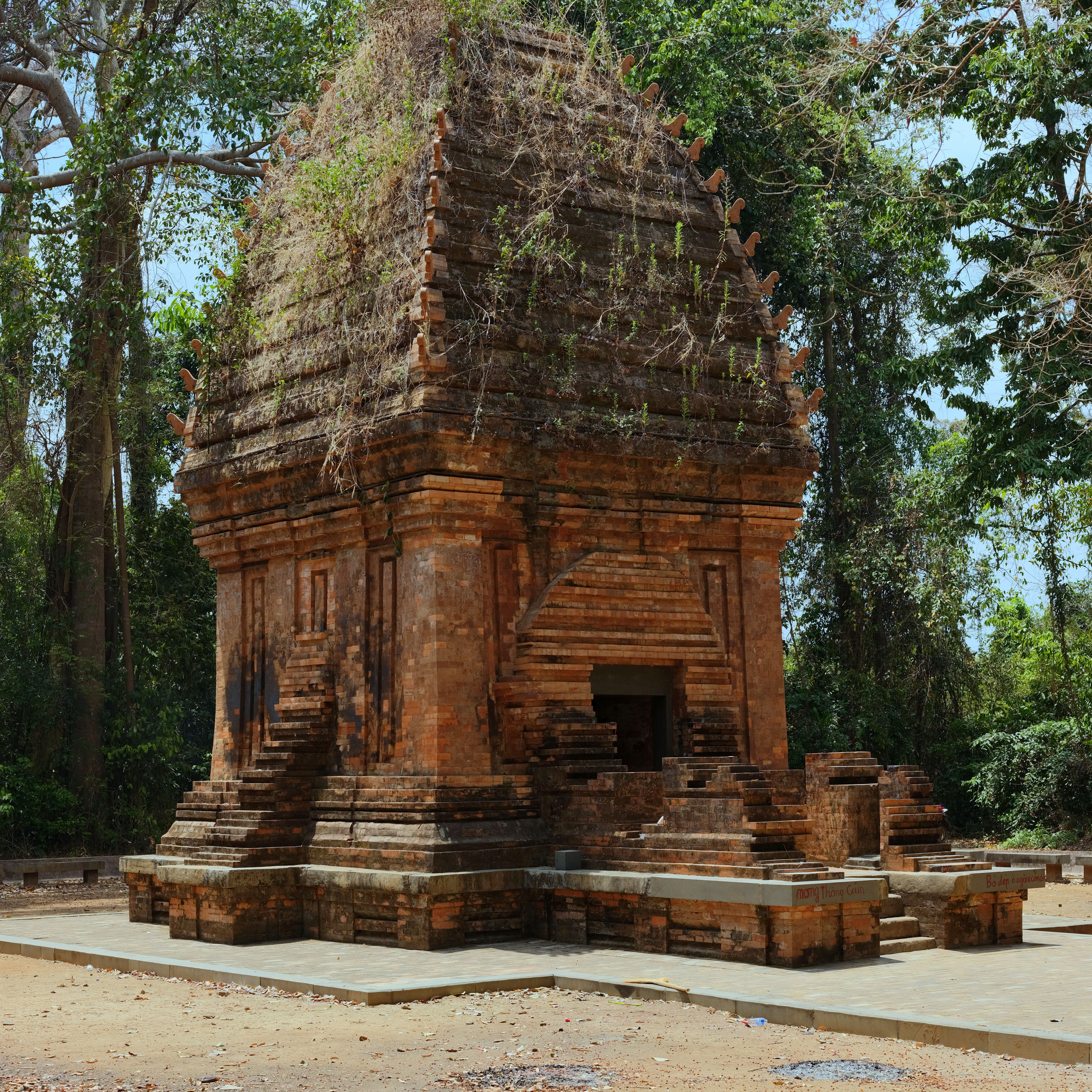

- Location in Vietnam

Religion
- Affiliation: Hinduism
- Province: Đắk Lắk
- Deity: Shiva

Location
- Location: Ea Rốk
- Country: Vietnam
- Interactive map of Yang Prong Tower
- Coordinates: 13°12′35.8″N 107°49′50.7″E

Architecture
- Type: Champa
- Completed: late 13th century

Website
- Tháp Yang Prong (Dak Lak Museum)

Yang Prong Tower is a Cham temple tower located in Ea Rốk commune, Ea Súp district, Đắk Lắk province, Vietnam, about 100 km from Buôn Ma Thuột.

== History ==
The tower was first described by French ethnographer Henri Maitre in his book Les jungles Moï.

Yang Prong means "Great Gods" in the local Jarai language. The tower was built in the late 13th century under Jaya Simhavarman III. It is the only Cham tower in the Central Highlands region of Vietnam.

On August 3, 1991, the Yang Prong Tower was classified as a national monument

== Gallery ==
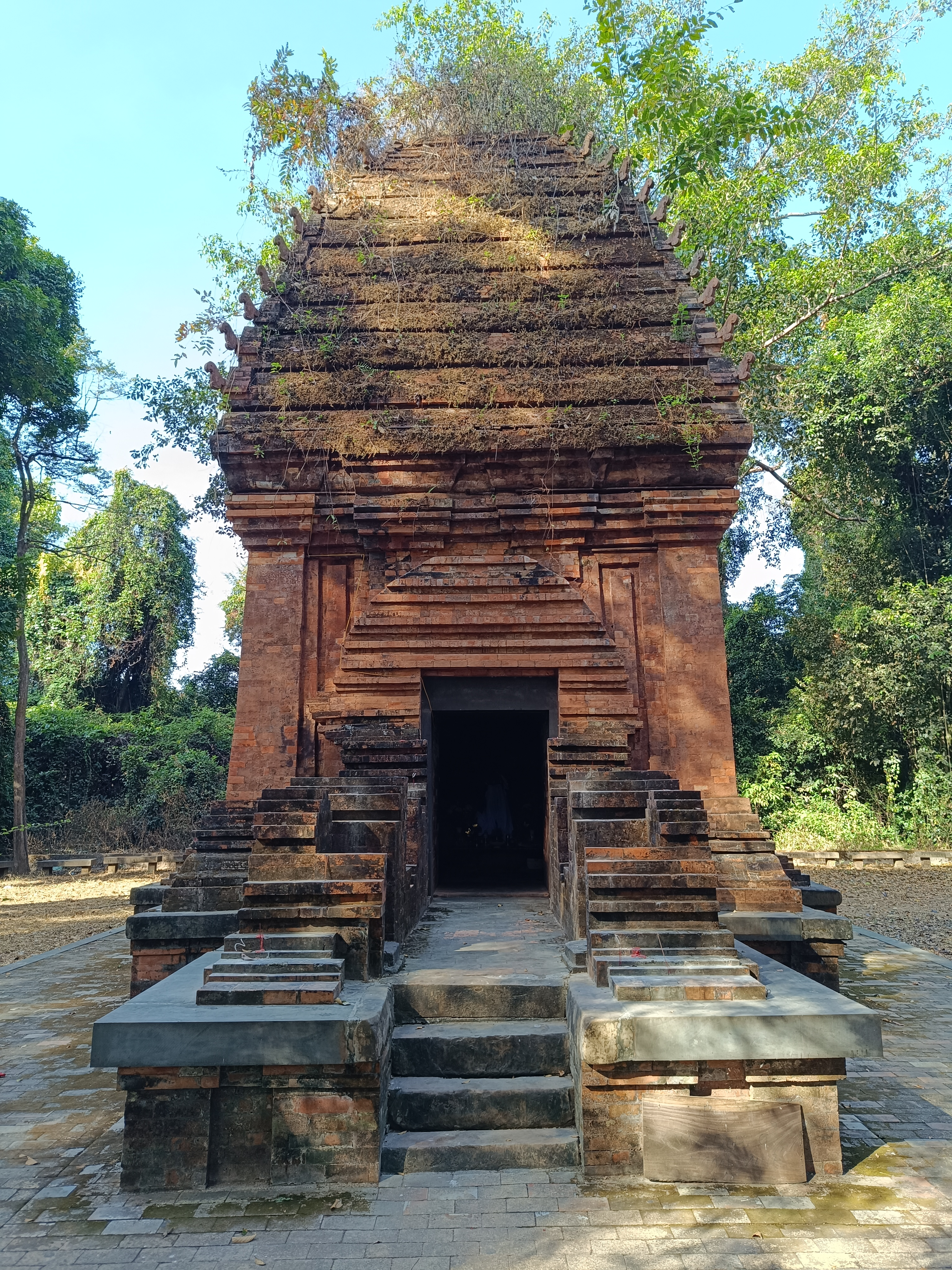
East side

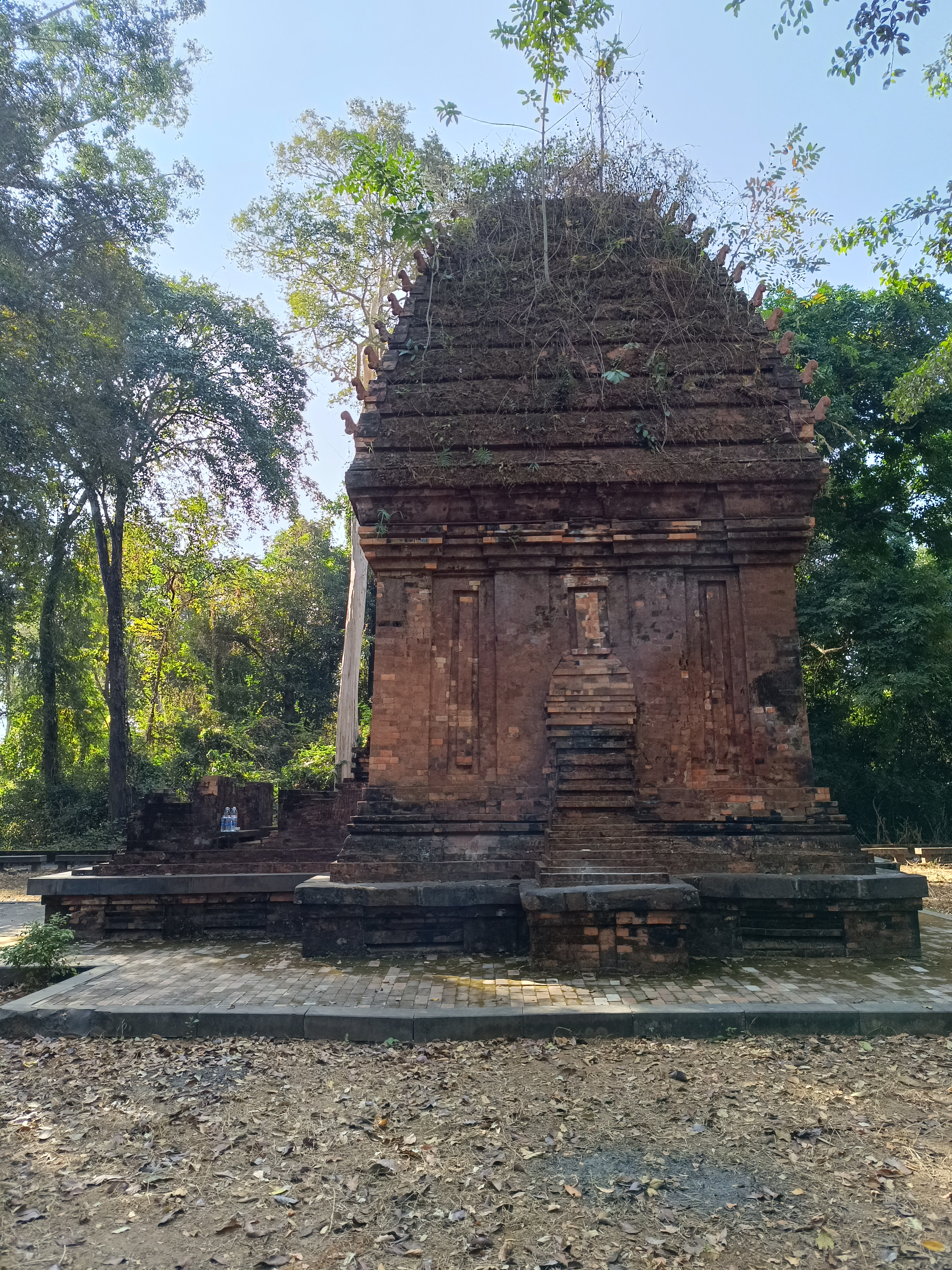
North side

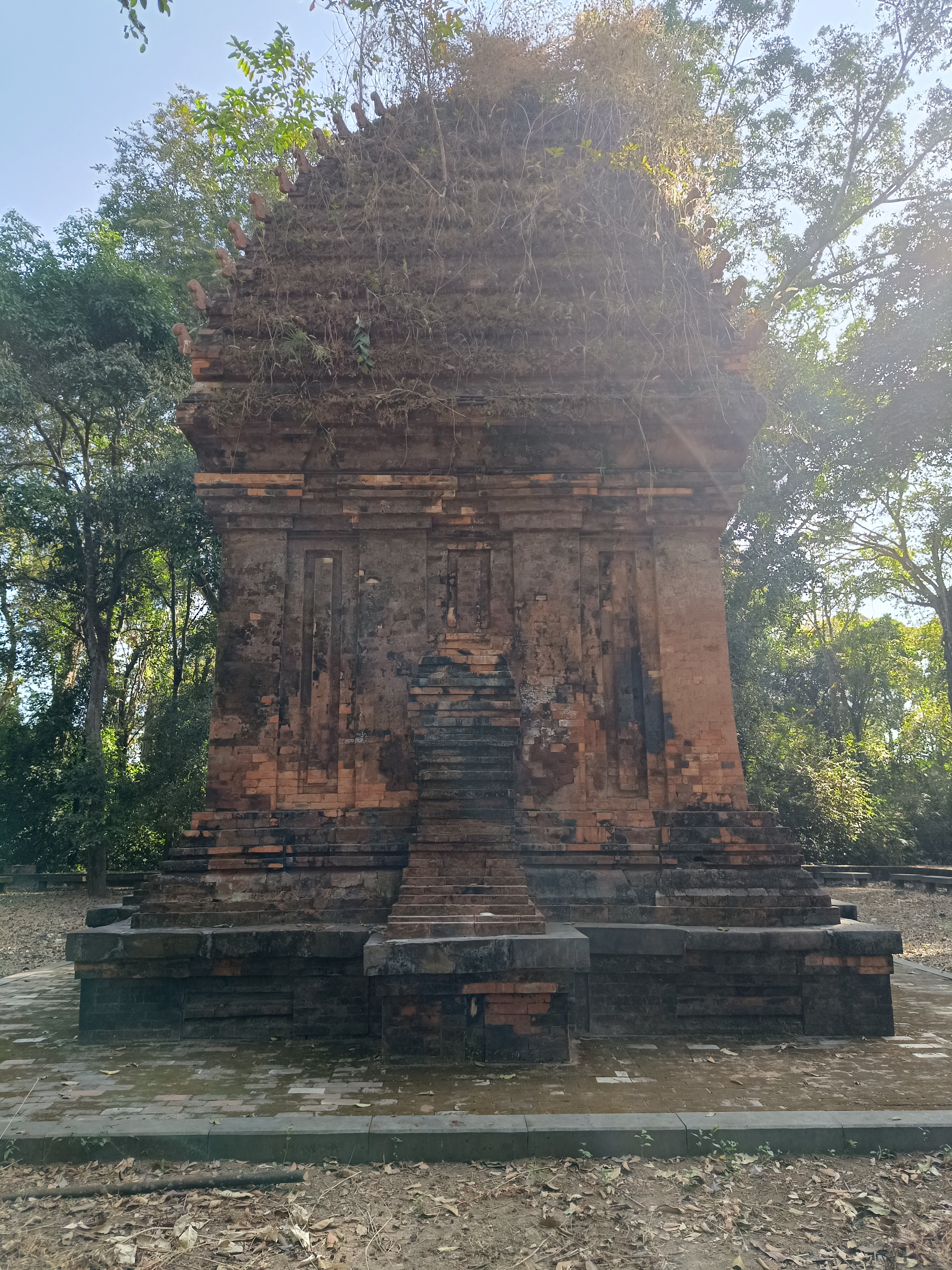
West side

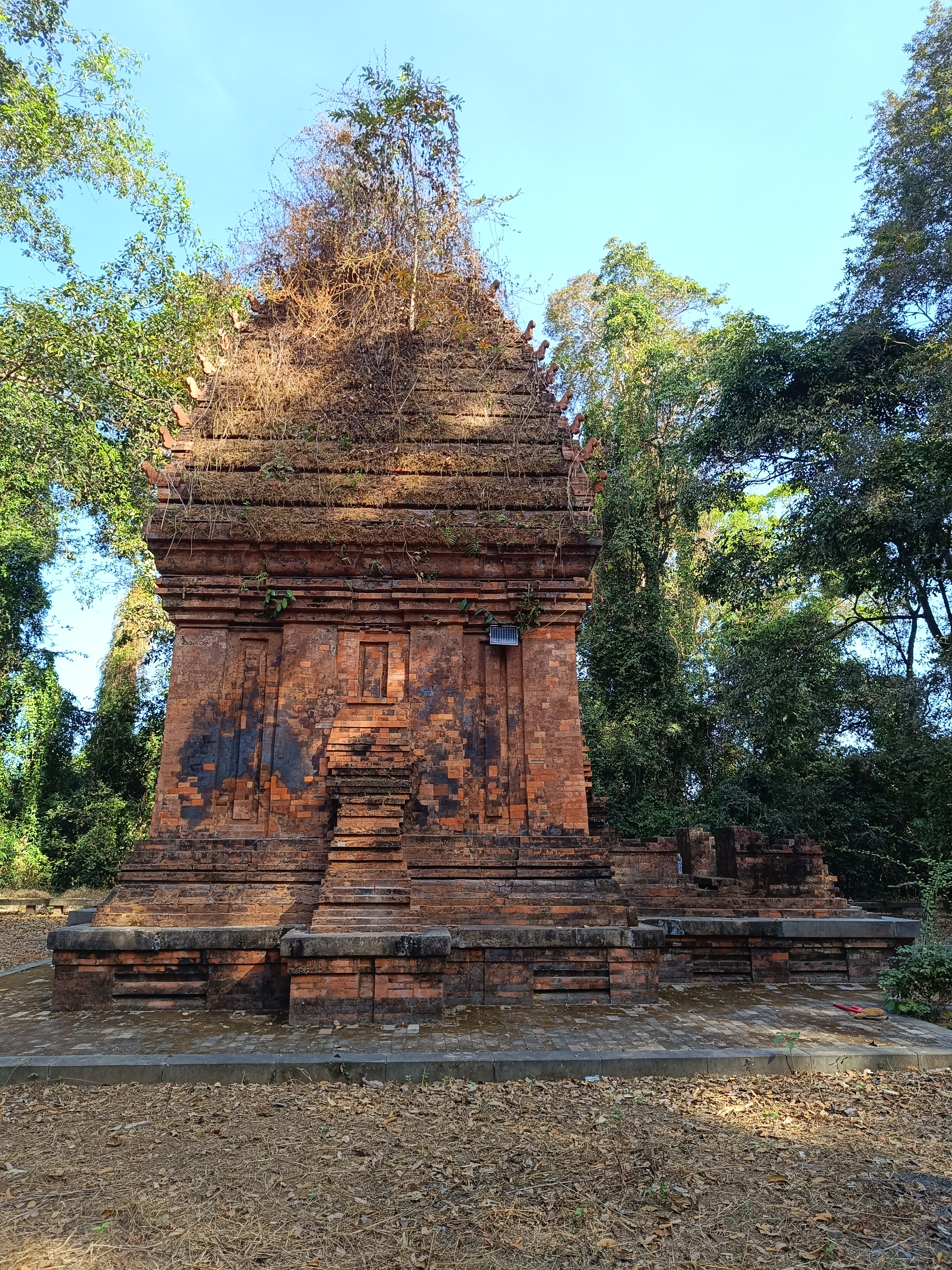
South side

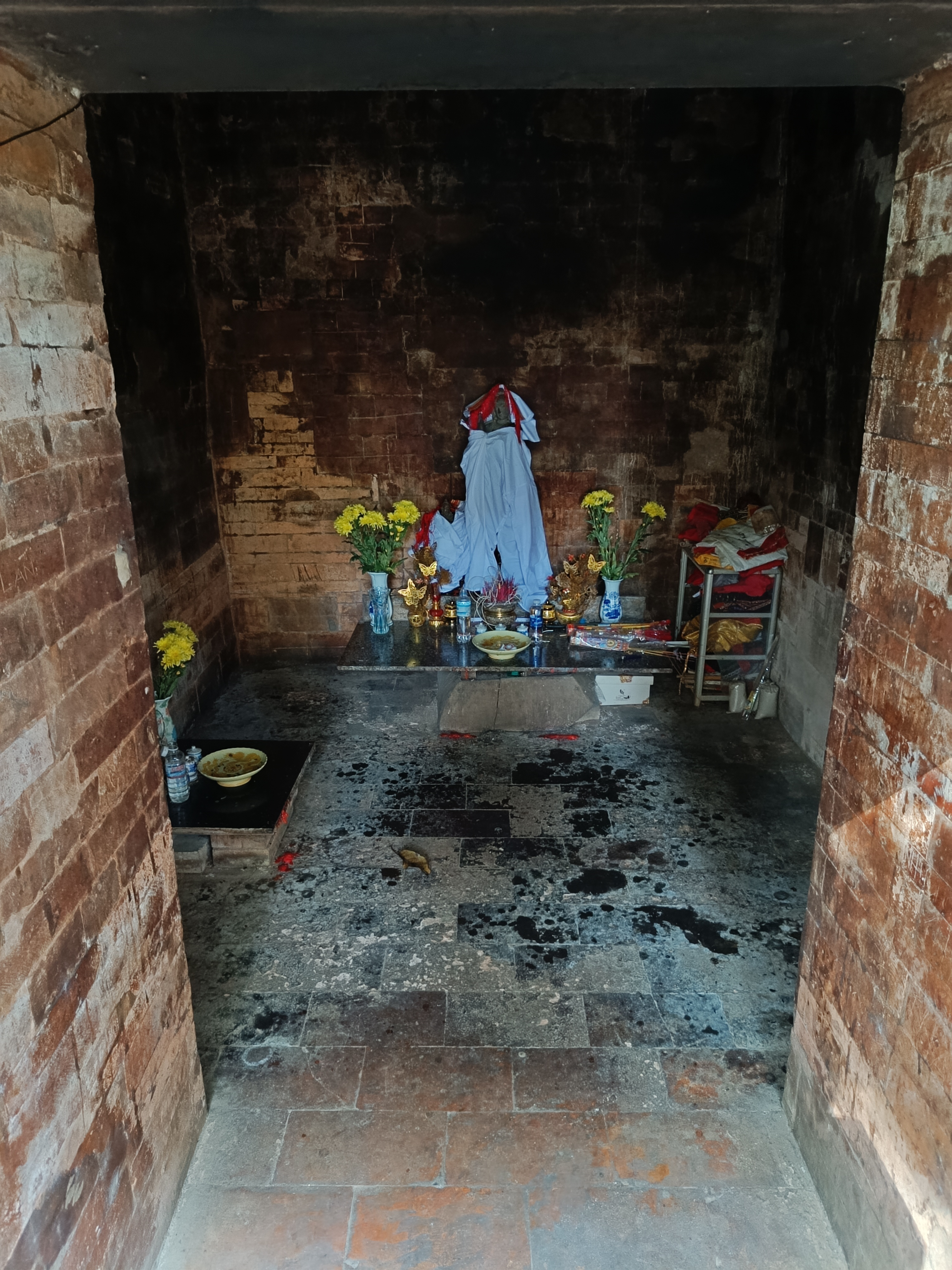
Interior
