= Po Klong Garai Temple =

Religious building in Vietnam

Po Klong Garai
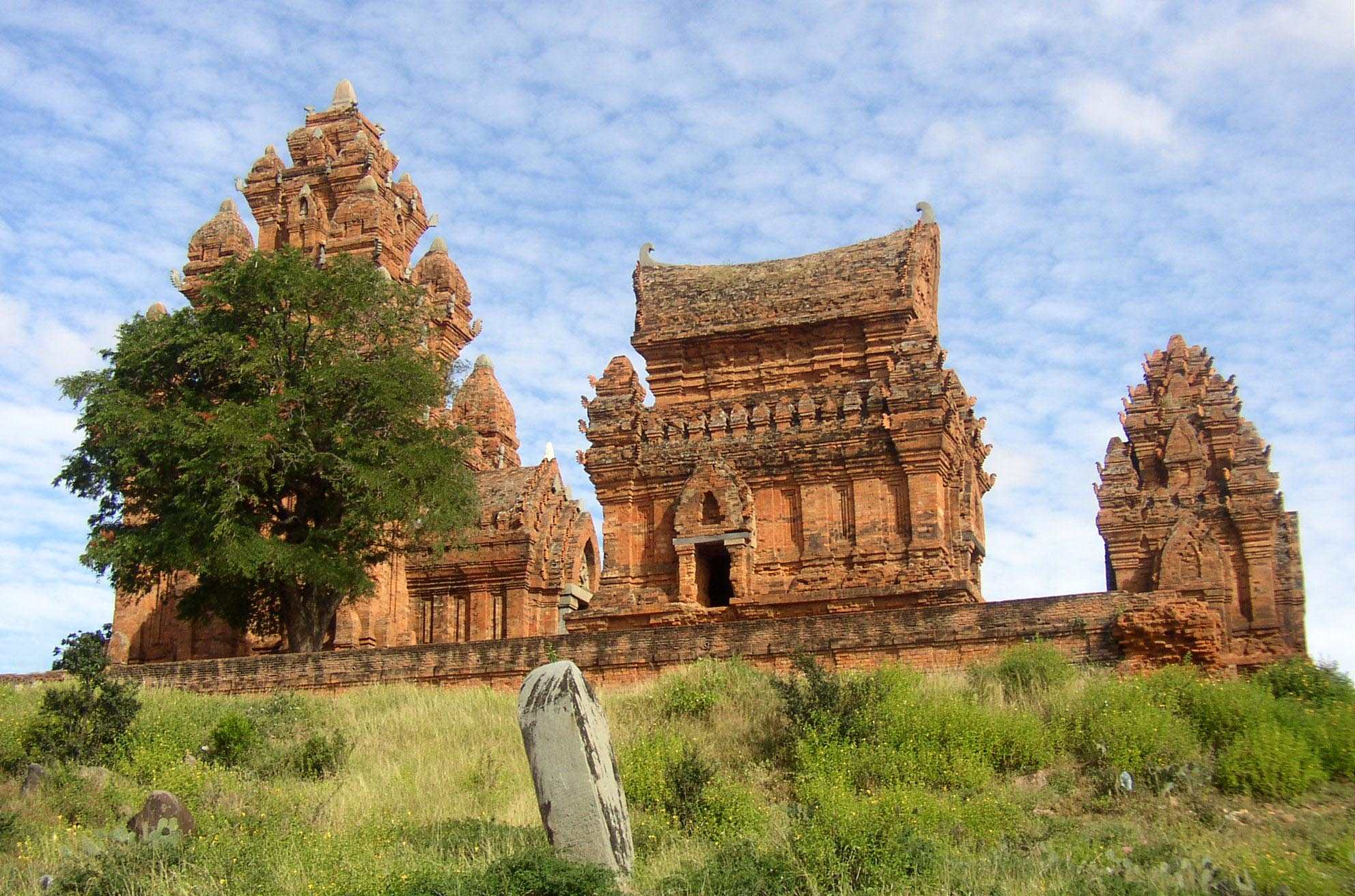

- Location in Vietnam

Religion
- Affiliation: Hinduism
- Province: Ninh Thuận
- Deity: Shiva

Location
- Location: Phan Rang
- Country: Vietnam
- Interactive map of Po Klong Garai
- Coordinates: 11°36′04″N 108°56′49″E

Architecture
- Type: Cham

Po Klong Garai Temple is a Hindu Cham religious complex located in the Cham principality of Panduranga, in what is now Phan Rang in southern Vietnam. It was built in honor of the legendary king Po Klaung Garai, who ruled Panduranga from 1151 to 1205, by the historic King Jaya Sinhavarman III,

== Legend of King Klong Garai ==
According to legend, Po Klong Garai (Cham language: Great water-dragon sovereign or Dragon king of J'rai people) started life as a lowly cowherd, but became king of Champa by destiny, ruling wisely and for the good of the people. When the Khmer of Cambodia invaded his kingdom, he challenged them to settle the matter peacefully in a tower-building contest. Po Klong Garai prevailed in the contest, thereby obliging the invaders to return home. After his death, Po Klong Garai became a god and protector of the people on earth; it is said that the tower he built in his contest with the Khmer is the tower that today is known by his name.

== History of the Temple ==
The Cham King Jaya Simhavarman III (Viet: Chê Mân) is credited with constructing the tower in honor of Po Klaung Garai toward the end of the 13th century. However, the presence of several steles from an earlier period suggests that Jaya Simhavarman may merely have restored and added to structures that were already in place.

An inscription, dated 1050, at Po Klong Garai commemorated the military victory of two Cham princes (presumably representing the northern dynasty of Indrapura headquartered near Mỹ Sơn) over the people of Panduranga in southern Champa. According to the inscription, the victorious princes celebrated by erecting two lingas and a victory column.

== Site of the Temple ==
The temple of Po Klaung Garai belongs to what is known as the Thap Mam Style of Cham art and architecture. It consists of three brick towers: a main tower with three stories, a smaller gate tower, and an elongated tower with a saddle-like roof. The group of buildings is well preserved, and "is distinguished by the purity of its outlines and the austerity of its decor." Over the front door of the main tower is a sculpture of the god Siva that is regarded as one of the masterpieces of the Thap Mam Style. The remaining images are less impressive, revealing "an art in terminal decline, due to its stiffness and arid workmanship." The tower with the saddle-like roof is said to be dedicated to the God of Flame, Thang Chuh Yang Pui.

The primary religious image in the temple is a mukhalinga of the 16th or 17th century. A mukhalinga is a linga with a human face. In general, the linga is the emblem of the Hindu god Siva, but the Cham say that this one is a statue of King Po Klaung Garai. The temple is still the site of Cham religious festivals.

== See also ==
- Art of Champa
