= Huyền Trân =

Vietnamese princess (1289–1340)

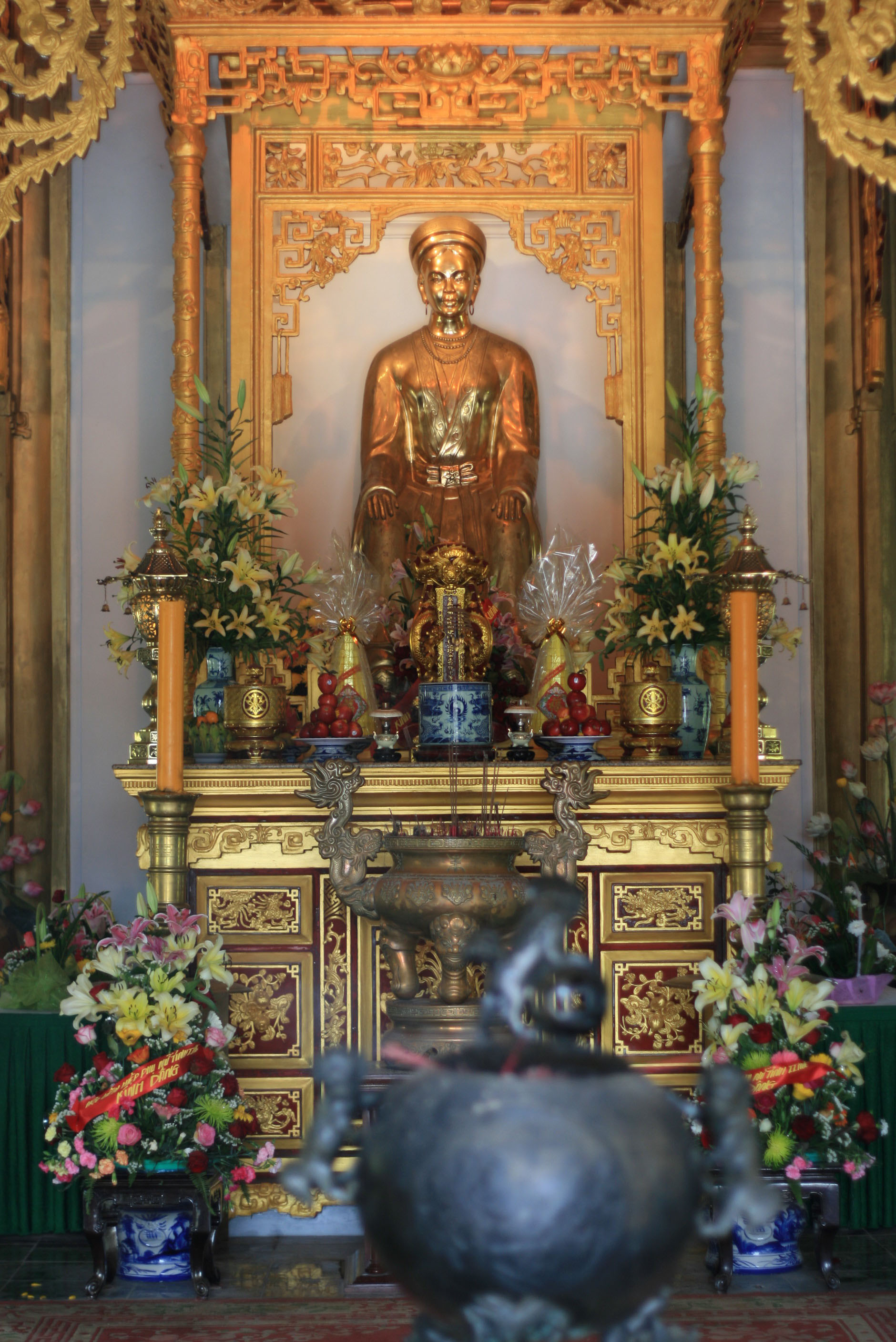
Statue of Huyền Trân in Huế.

Princess Huyền Trân (Vietnamese: Công Chúa Huyền Trân, Chữ Nôm: 玄珍公主) (1289-1340) was a princess of the Trần Dynasty of Đại Việt, who later married to King Jaya Simhavarman III of Champa and titled queen consort Parameshvari of Champa from 1306 to 1307.

== Biography ==
She was the daughter of Emperor Trần Nhân Tông and the younger sister of Emperor Trần Anh Tông. There are few details in the historical record about Huyền Trân's life. In 1293, Trần Nhân Tông abdicated in favor of his son, Trần Anh Tông, in order to become a monk in a pagoda on Mount Yên Tử.

In 1306, on orders of Trần Anh Tông, Huyền Trân was married to the Champa king as Queen Parameshvari of Champa, in return for the two provinces of Châu Ô and Châu Lý (or Châu Rí) (today these provinces are Quảng Trị, Huế and Danang).

== Huyền Trân in art ==
The adventure and rescue of princess Huyền Trân (well known in Vietnamese literature and history as "Huyền Trân Công Chúa") has become an attractive topic for poems, arts and music in Vietnamese chữ Nôm. Her marriage is also proverbial.

- Play: Huyên Trân công chúa (Princess Huyền Trân) by Đoàn Thanh Ái
- Literature: Hermitage Among the Clouds by Thích Nhất Hạnh
- Poems: Princess Huyền Trân by Hoàng Cao Khải, and Farewell to Huyền Trân by Đào Tiến Luyện
- Music: Epic of the Mandarin Road,
  - Farewell to Huyền Trân by Đào Tiến Luyện, set to music by Phạm Duy,
  - Princess Huyền Trân by musician Nguyễn Hiền,
  - Missing by musician Châu Kỳ,
  - Love story of Huyền Trân by Nam Lộc,
- Hard life in Champa (folklore song).

Most cities in Vietnam have named major streets after her.
