= Jaya Simhavarman III =

- King of Champa arddharāja

King of Champa
- Reign: 1288–1307
- Predecessor: Indravarman V
- Successor: Jaya Simhavarman IV
- Born: Unknown; Champa
- Died: 1307; Champa
- Spouse: Bhāskaradevī; Tapasi; Paramecvari (Huyền Trân)
- Issue: Jaya Sinhavarman IV; Chế Năng
Names
- Jaya Simhavarman pu cei (Prince) Harijit Paramātmaja
Regnal name
- Jaya Simhavarman
- Father: Indravarman V
- Mother: Gaurendraksmi

Jaya Simhavarman III (r. 1288 - 1307), Chế Mân (制旻), or Prince Harijit, son of King Indravarman V and Queen Gaurendraksmi, was a king of Champa during a time when the threat of the Mongols was imminent. He held the title the half-king/junior king (arddharāja) on behalf of his father.

== Yuan invasion of 1283–85 ==
In 1282, Kublai Khan tried to gain passage through Champa of his ambassadors, but Chế Mân took them prisoner. Kublai Khan then asked the Trần dynasty of Đại Việt for entrance into Champa but received the same denial. In early 1283, Kublai dispatched a fleet of 100 warships led by Sogetu and invaded Champa. The battle hardened Yuan troops with their naval and armor superiority quickly drove the Cham out of the capital of Vijaya. Indravarman V and Crown Prince Harijit fled into the mountains, waging guerilla resistance against the enemy and refused to surrender, forcing the Mongols to suffer heat, illness, humidity, lack of supplies and desertion. Sogetu then requested Kublai for reinforcement and supplies. Yuan logistics and reinforcement fleet of 20,000 troops and 200 warships under Qutuq and Ariq Qaya arrived in Champa in April 1284. Due to lack of coordination, the Yuan fleet had to catch up Sogetu's forces, whom already marched north to present-day Huế and blazed a trait of destruction on Cham port-cities along his way north. Indravarman and Harijit were still rejecting Kublai's current demands and delivered excuses to the Khan, which Kublai found dishonored.

Facing unexpected Cham defiance, Kublai ordered his eleventh son Prince Toghon to organize a land invasion of Champa through Dai Viet. The Dai Viet king then allied with Champa. They defeated Yuan forces in June 1285 at battle of Chuong Duong. The death of the top Mongol leader, Sagatou, was the beginning of the end of the Mongol invasion of Champa and Annam.

== Marriage with Huyen Tran ==
The mutual struggle against the Mongols brought Đại Việt and Champa closer together. Thus, the Đại Việt emperor Trần Nhân Tông married off his daughter, Huyen Tran, to Chế Mân in exchange for the provinces of Chau O (Cham:Vuyar) and Chau Ly (Cham:Ulik). His other "first rank wife", or "first queen", was Princess Bhaskaradevi, though he also married a princess from Java, Queen Tapasi.

However, Chế Mân died soon after and the Princess Huyen Tran refusal to die with her husband was considered a national disgrace to Champa. In response to this, Chế Mân's son, Che Chi, set out to recapture two districts ceded by Champa to Đại Việt. He was defeated, however, and died a prisoner in Đại Việt.

== Temples ==
When Simhavarman was still a prince/junior-king, he authorized the construction of a temple dedicating for the Lady of Kauṭhāra at Po Nagar temple, Nha Trang in 1277.

During his proper reign, Simhavarman donated several structures and pavilions to Po Klaung Garai at Phan Rang. He also initiated the construction of Yang Prong Tower, another religious temple located in Ea Súp district, Đắk Lắk province, Central Highlands.

== Bibliography ==
- Griffiths, Arlo; Lepoutre, Amandine (2016). "Études du corpus des inscriptions du Campā, VIII". Bulletin de l'École française d'Extrême-Orient. 102: 195–296. doi:10.3406/befeo.2016.6235 – via HAL.
- Lo, Jung-pang (2012). Elleman, Bruce A. (ed.). China as a Sea Power, 1127-1368: A Preliminary Survey of the Maritime Expansion and Naval Exploits of the Chinese People During the Southern Song and Yuan Periods. Singapore: NUS Press. p. 287.

Preceded by Indravarman V 1265–1288	King of Champa; 1288–1307	Succeeded by Jaya Sinhavarman IV 1307–1312
