= Jaya Simhavarman IV =

- King of Champa

King of Champa
- Reign: 1307–1312
- Predecessor: Jaya Simhavarman III
- Successor: Chế Năng
- Born: c, 1284? Champa
- Died: 1312; An Nam
Names
- Harijitatmaja
Regnal name
- Jaya Simhavarman IV
- Father: Jaya Simhavarman III
- Mother: Bhaskaradevi

Jaya Simhavarman IV or originally Mahendravarman, or Chế Chí (制至), son of Chế Mân and first queen Princess Bhaskaradevi, was born in 1284 as Prince Harijitatmaja. He reigned as the king of Champa from 1307 - 1312.

== Biography ==
Because Jaya Simhavarman IV's Vietnamese stepmother refused to die with her husband and Chế Chí's father, Chế Mân, according to rites of Champa, Chế Chí set out to recapture two districts ceded by Champa to Annam in their time of peace brought on by the wedding of his father and stepmother. He was defeated, however, and died a prisoner in Annam. After his capture, his brother, Che Da A Ba, or Che Nang, was assigned to govern Champa by the An Nam.

== See also ==
- History of the Cham–Vietnamese wars

Preceded by Jaya Sinhavarman III 1288–1307	King of Champa; 1307–1312	Succeeded by Chế Năng 1312–1318
