= Jaya Sinhavarman V =

- King of Champa

King of Champa
- Reign: 1312–1318
- Predecessor: Chế Chí
- Successor: Chế A Nan
- Father: Jaya Simhavarman III
- Mother: Tapasi

Jaya Sinhavarman V or Chế Năng was a vassal king of Champa. Chế Năng was son of king Jaya Simhavarman III and the Javanese (Yavadvipa) queen Tapasi. His name was also Simhavarman. During his reign, he tried to conquer previously lost territories of O and Ly. In 1318, the Vietnamese emperor, Tran Minh Tong, dispatched generals Tran Quoc Chan and Pham Ngu Lao to defeat Che Nang. Che Nang was defeated and escaped to Java.

== See also ==
- History of the Cham–Vietnamese wars

Preceded by Jaya Sinhavarman IV 1307–1312	King of Champa; 1312–1318	Succeeded by Jaya Ananda 1318–1342
