= Art of Champa =

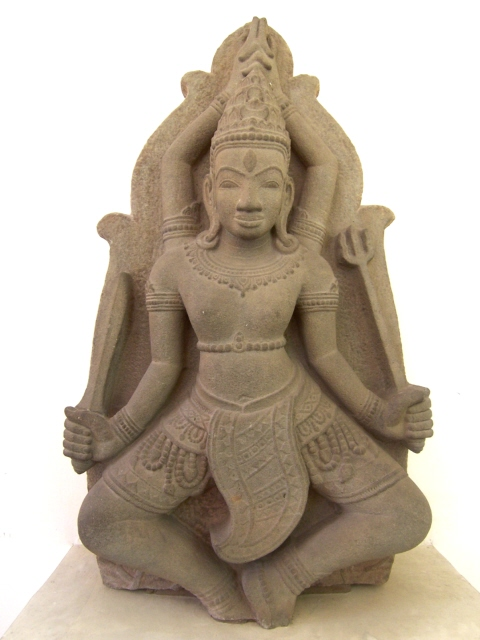
This late 11th- or 12th-century sculpture illustrates both the preferred medium of the Cham artists (stone sculpture in high relief), and the most popular subject-matter, the god Shiva and themes associated with the god. Shiva can be recognized by the third eye in the middle of his forehead and by the attribute of the trident. The hands above his head are making the gesture called uttarabodhi mudra, which is regarded as a symbol of perfection.

Champa was an Southeast Asian civilization that flourished along the coasts of what is now central and southern Vietnam for roughly a one thousand-year period between 500 and 1700 AD. The original Cham and Proto-Chamic peoples were mainland Austronesian sailors, who adopted as their principal vocations those of trade, shipping, and piracy. Their cities were ports of call on important trade routes linking India, China and the Indonesian islands. The history of Champa was one of intermittent conflict and cooperation with the people of Java, the Khmer of Angkor in Cambodia and Đại Việt (Annam) of the Vietnamese in what is now northern Vietnam. It was to Dai Viet that Champa finally lost its independence.

The architecture of the Indian rock-cut temples, particularly the sculptures, were perhaps widely influenced by or similar with South Indian, and Indianized architecture of neighboring Cambodian and Javanese temples. The artistic legacy of Champa consists primarily of sandstone sculptures - both sculpture in the round and relief sculpture - and brick buildings. Some metal statues and decorative items have also survived. Much of the remaining art expresses religious themes, and though some pieces would have been purely decorative, others would have served important functions in the religious life of the Chams, which synthesized elements of Hinduism (especially Saivism), Buddhism and indigenous cults.

This artistic legacy has been decimated by neglect, war, and vandalism. Much of the damage has been done in the 20th century. Some French scholars such as Henri Parmentier and Jean Boisselier were able to take photographs, create drawings, and pen descriptions of works which have been destroyed in the meantime. Neglect continues to endanger the legacy of Champa to this day, especially the neglect of the inscribed stone steles, the source of much valuable information on the history of Champa. The participants in the Vietnam War wrought their share of devastation, wiping out for example the vestiges of the Buddhist monastery at Dong Duong (Quảng Nam). Willful vandalism and pilfering are an ongoing concern.

The largest collection of Cham art is on exhibit at the Museum of Cham Sculpture in Da Nang. Substantial collections are housed in the Guimet Museum in Paris, the Museum of Vietnamese History in Saigon, and the Museum of History in Hanoi. Smaller collections may be found in the Museum of Fine Arts in Saigon and the Museum of Fine Arts in Hanoi.

== Forms of visual art ==
The remnants of classical Cham art extant today consist mainly in temples of brick, sandstone sculptures in the round, and sandstone sculptures in high and low relief. A few bronze sculptures and decorative items made of metal remain as well. There are no works of marble or other higher quality stone. Likewise there are no paintings or sketches. The people of Champa wrote, and perhaps also sketched, on leaves, which have not withstood the hot and humid climate of coastal Vietnam. Items made of perishable materials, such as wood, for the most part have not survived.

=== Metal statues and jewelry ===
The remaining works of art made of metal include bronze statues of the Mahayanist deities Lokesvara and Tara dated approximately 900 AD and associated with the Buddhist art of Dong Duong. An even older bronze statue of the Buddha bears a strong resemblance to Indian Buddhist statues of the Amaravati style; scholars doubt that it was originally from Champa, surmising instead that it must have come into the country as part of the maritime trade that linked India with Southeast Asia and China.

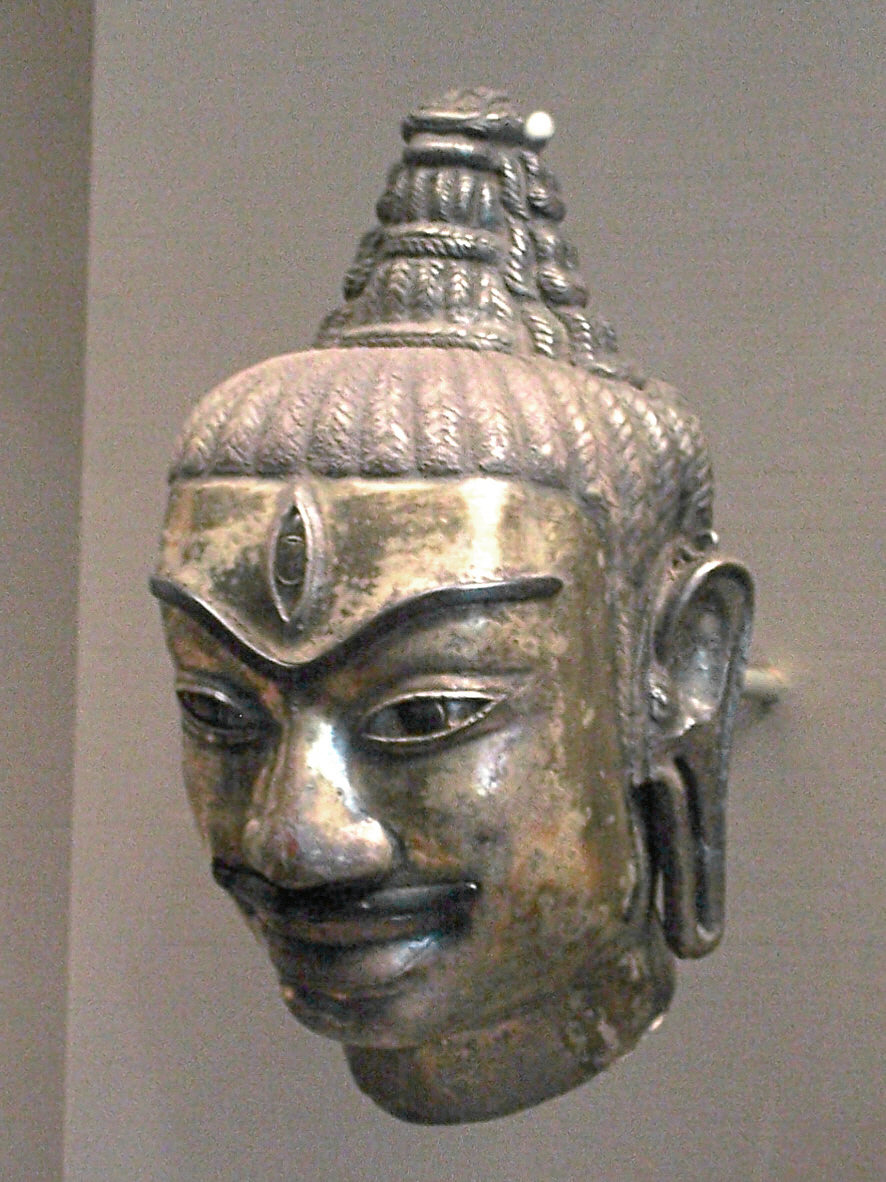
This Cham kosa, or metal sleeve to be fitted over a linga, is the face of shiva, as can be recognized from the third eye in the center of the forehead and the chignon hairstyle known as jatamukuta.

We have abundant textual evidence of much classical Cham art that once existed that has been lost to the ravages of time and the depredations of human vandals, looters, and conquerors. For example, the early 14th-century Chinese historian Ma Duanlin reported the existence of a large statue of the Buddha made of gold and silver; the current whereabouts of this statue are unknown. The Cham kings themselves have left us stone inscriptions describing the gifts of now lost precious objects they made to the shrines and sanctuaries of the realm. Especially noteworthy was the practice of donating decorated metallic sleeves (kosa) and diadems (mukuta) to important lingas and the divinities with which they were affiliated. For example, an inscription on a stone stele dated approximately 1080 and found at Mỹ Sơn reports that King Harivarman IV (r. 1074–1080) donated a "large, resplendent golden kosa adorned with the most beautiful jewels, more brilliant than the sun, illuminated day and night by the rays of shining gems, decorated by four faces" to the deity Srisanabhadresvara, a local embodiment of Shiva. A few years later, around 1088, Harivarman may have been outdone by his successor Indravarman, who donated a golden kosa with six faces (facing in the four cardinal directions, toward the Northeast and the Southeast) topped off by a nagaraja (serpent-king) ornament, and decorated with precious gemstones including a ruby, a sapphire, a topaz, and a pearl. Neither of these treasures has survived.

The written sources, including the Chinese books of history and the Cham inscriptions, also report on some of the catastrophic events, primarily acts of war, that led to the loss of Cham art. In the second quarter of the 5th century AD, according to the historian Ma Duanlin, a Chinese general named Yuen Kan sacked the capital of Champa, making off with many "rare and precious objects", including "tens of thousands of pounds of gold in ingots coming from statues which he had smelted." Similarly, at the beginning of the 7th century a marauding Chinese general named Liu Fang made off with "eighteen massive tablets of gold" commemorating the 18 previous kings of Champa. It is to be assumed that in the centuries that followed, frequent raids and conquests by Khmer and Vietnamese armies, which led to the eventual destruction of Champa as an independent political entity, likewise resulted in the removal of any portable works of art, including of course any works made of precious metals.

=== Temples ===
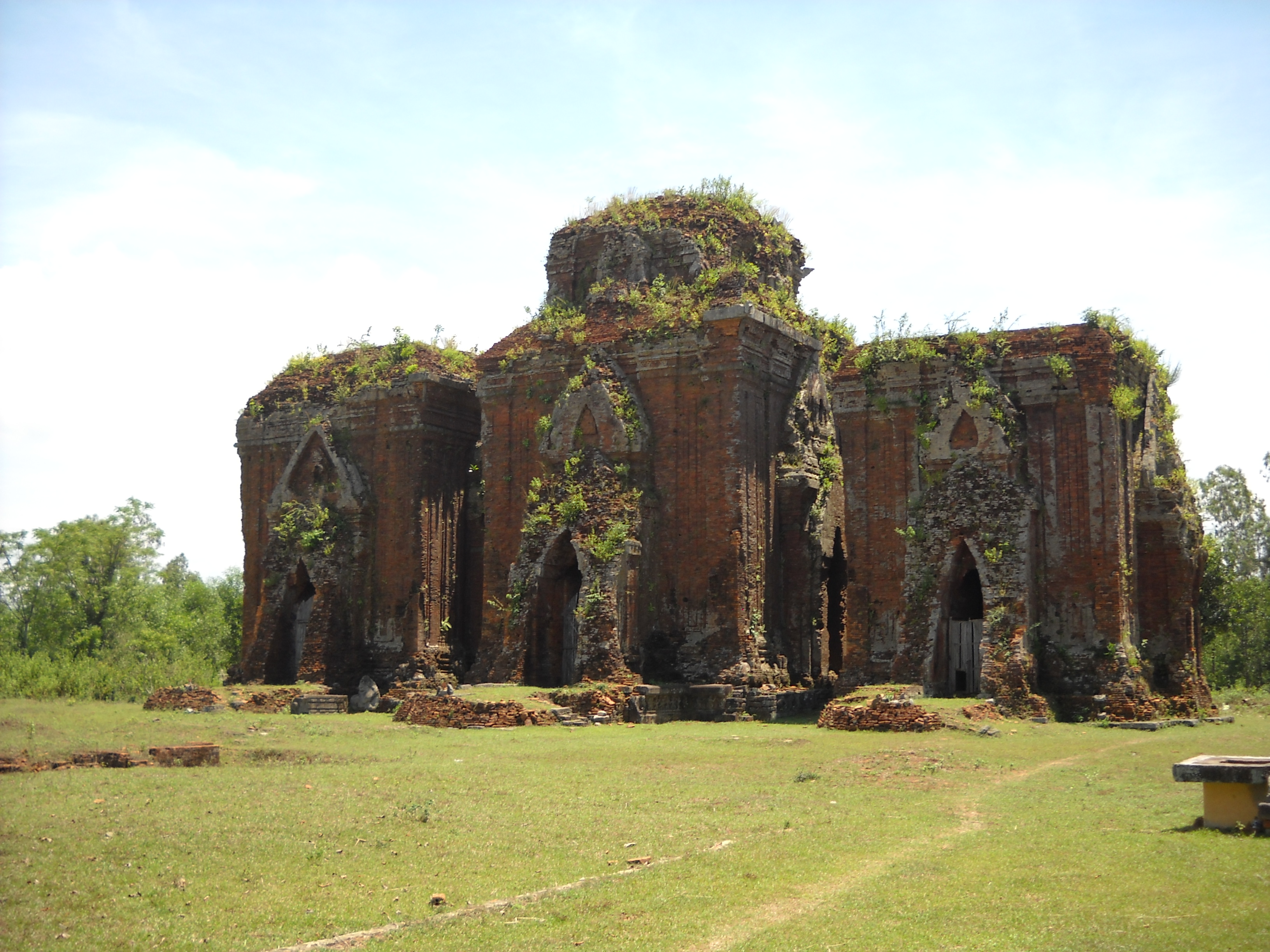
Chiên Đàn temple in Quảng Nam province.

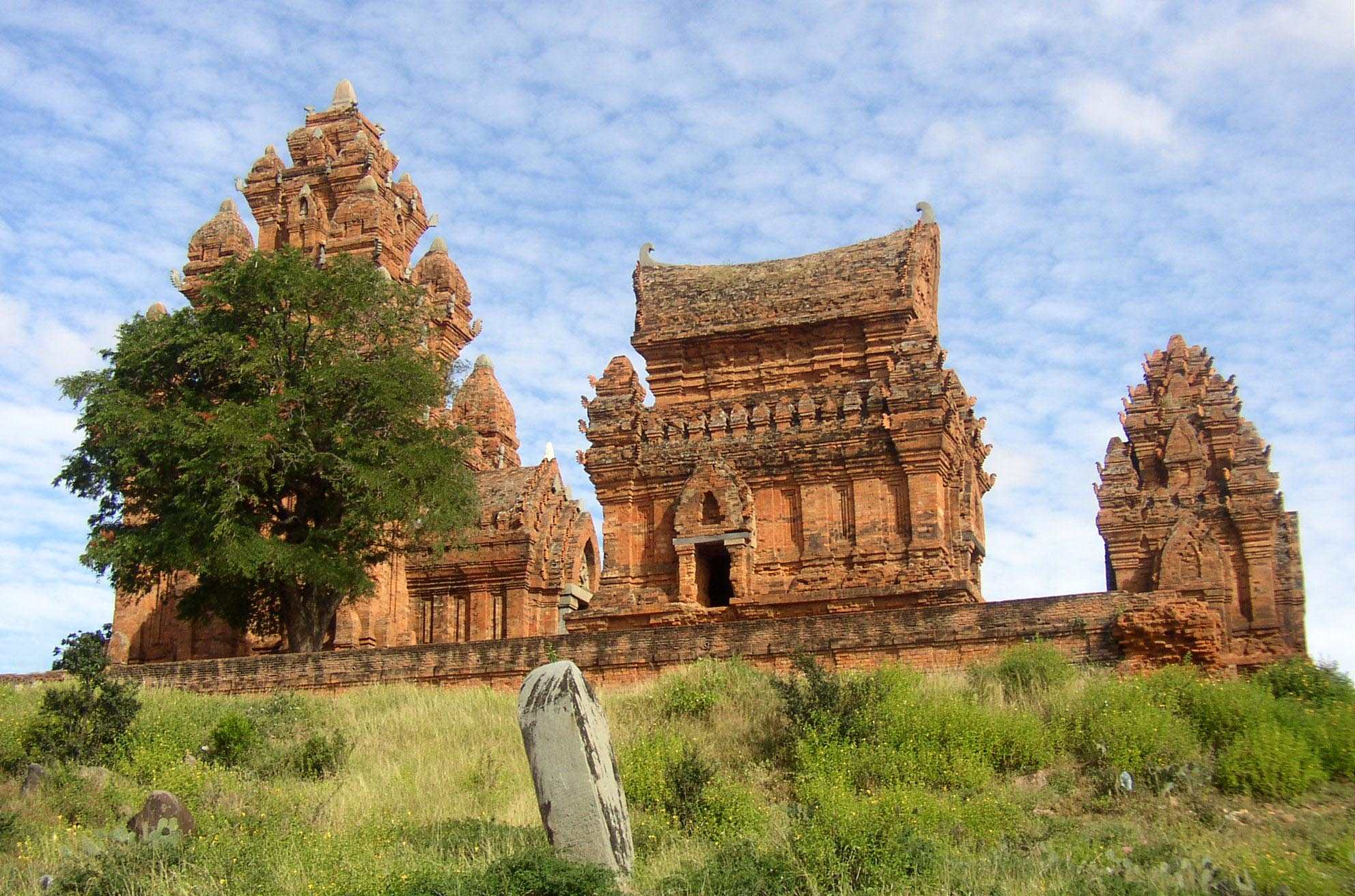
The profile of the 13th-century temple Po Klong Garai near Phan Rang includes all the buildings typical of a Cham temple. From left to right one can see the kalan, the attached mandapa, the saddle-shaped kosgrha, and the gopura.

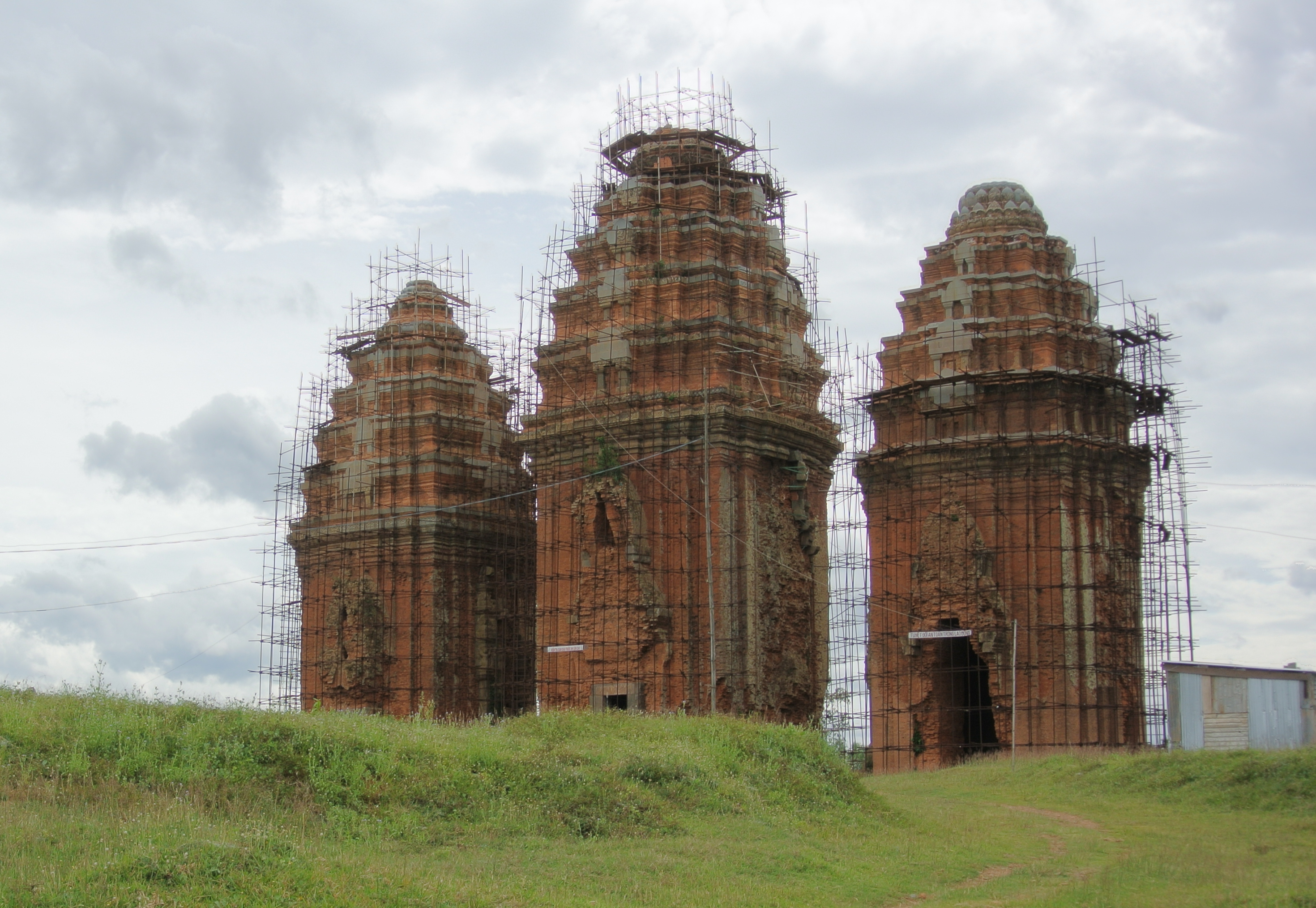
Dương Long Towers in Bình Định, the tallest still-existing Champa temple.

Unlike the Khmer of Angkor, who for the most part employed a grey sandstone to construct their religious buildings, the Cham built their temples from reddish bricks. Some of these brick structures can be still be visited in the Vietnamese countryside. The most important remaining sites include Mỹ Sơn near Da Nang, Đồ Bàn (Vijaya) near Quy Nhơn, Po Nagar near Nha Trang, and Po Klong Garai near Phan Rang.

==== Buildings constituting a temple ====
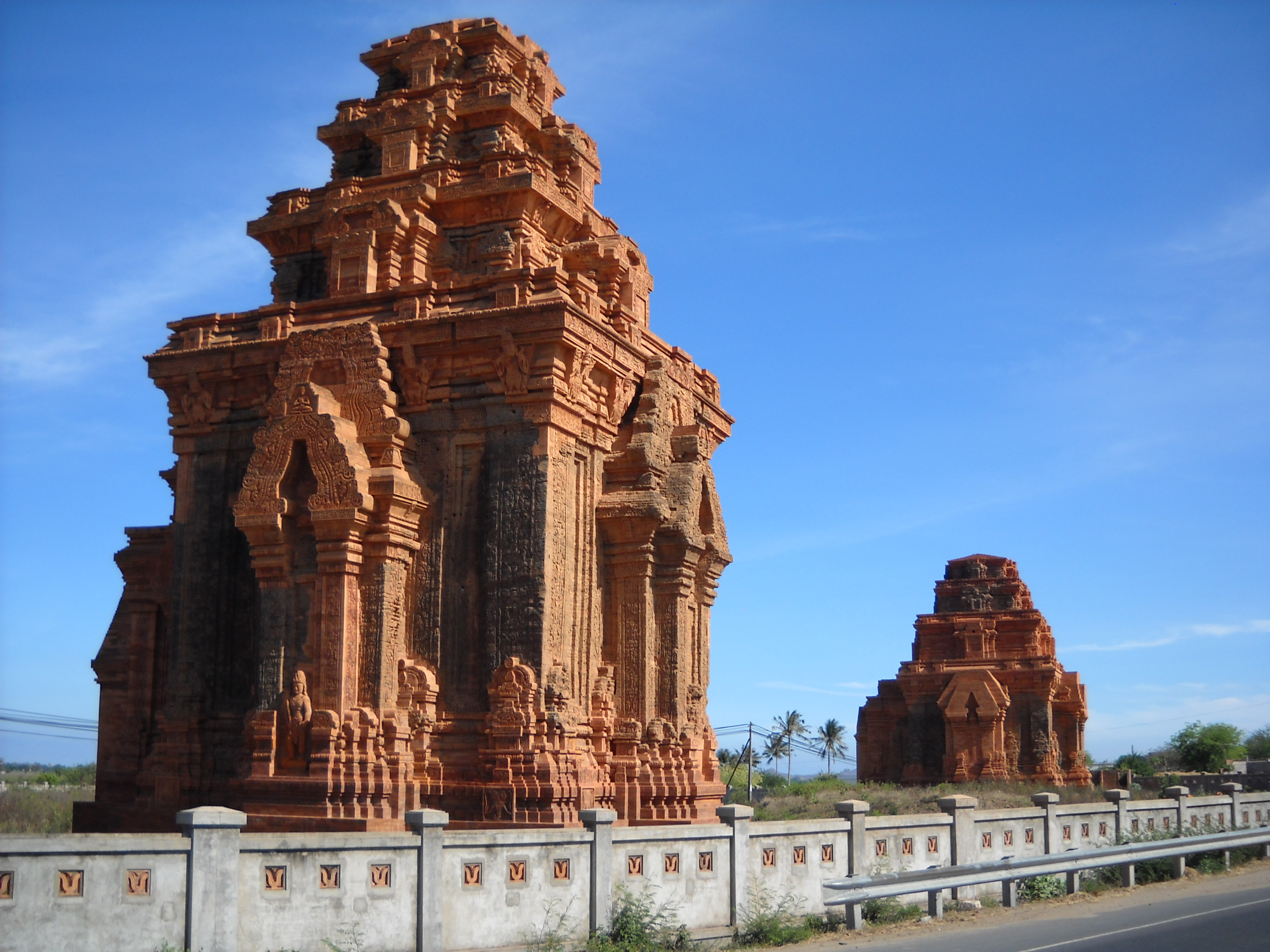
Hòa Lai Towers in Ninh Thuận province.

Typically, a Cham temple complex consisted of several different kinds of buildings.

- The kalan was the brick sanctuary, typically in the form of a tower, used to house the deity.
- The mandapa was an entry hallway contiguous with a sanctuary.
- The kosagrha or "fire-house" was the construction, typically with a saddle-shaped roof, used to house the valuables belonging to the deity or to cook for the deity.
- The gopura was a gate-tower leading into a walled temple complex.

These building types are typical for Hindu temples in general; the classification is valid not only for the architecture of Champa, but also for other architectural traditions of Greater India.

==== Most significant temples ====
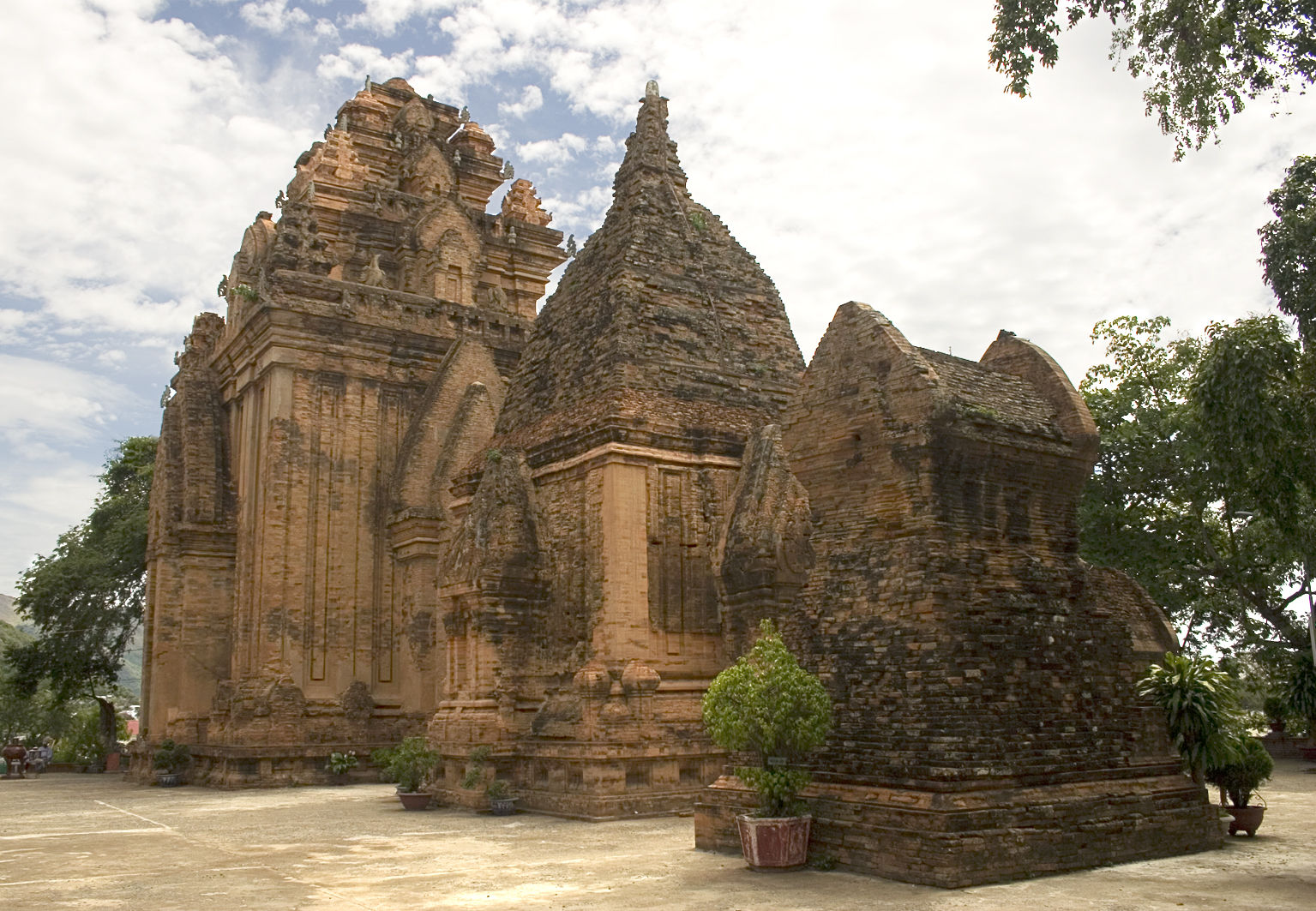
The temple of Po Nagar in Nha Trang.

The culturally most important temples of historical Champa were the temple of Bhadresvara located at Mỹ Sơn near modern Da Nang, and the temple of the goddess known as Bhagavati (her Hindu name) or Yan Po Nagar (her Cham name) located just outside modern Nha Trang.

- The temple of Bhadresvara was the principle religious foundations of northern Champa (known as Campadesa, Campapura or nagara Campa in the inscriptions). Scholars have identified the temple of Bhadresvara, a local incarnation of the universal deity Shiva, with the edifice "A1" at Mỹ Sơn. Though today A1 is in the process of devolving into a pile of rubble, it still existed as a magnificent tower when French scholars described it at the beginning of the 20th century.
- The temple of Yan Po Nagar was the principal religious foundation of southern Champa (or Panduranga, a word that is the basis for the modern name "Phan Rang.") Its buildings date from between the 8th and 13th centuries. The temple remains standing to this day across the Cai River from Nha Trang, and is in relatively good condition.

=== Sandstone sculptures ===
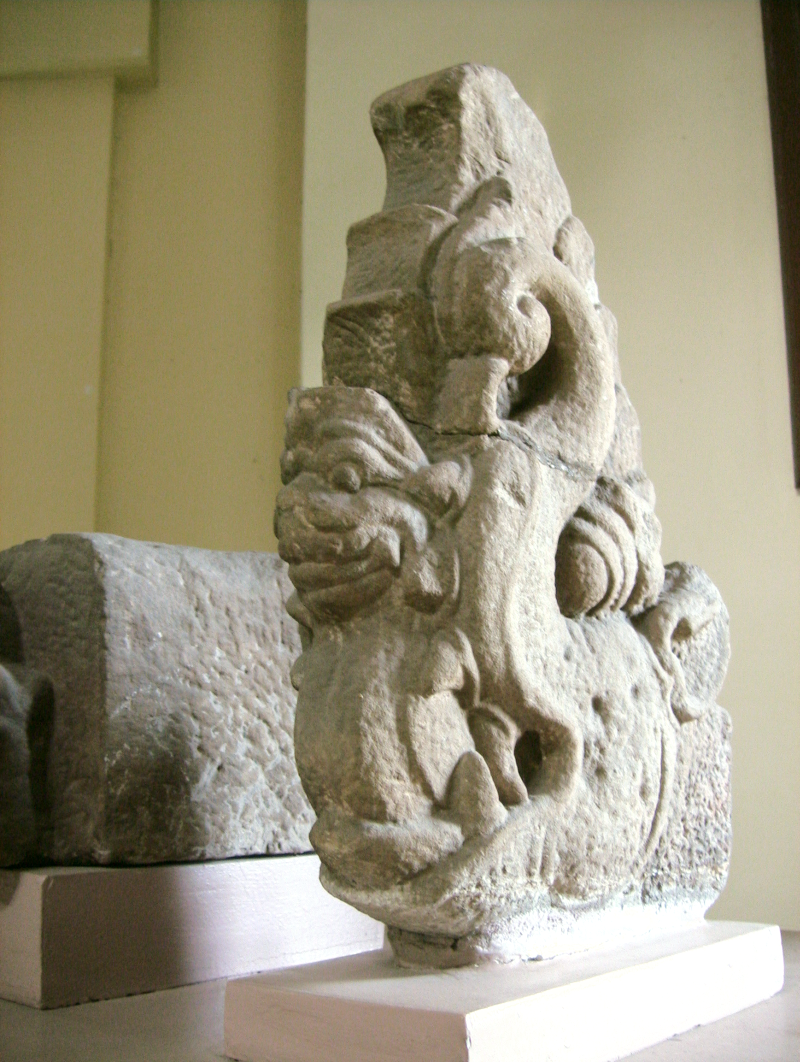
A decorative theme that originated in Java, and from there emanated to other parts of Greater India, is that of the makara sea monster disgorging some other being. In this 10th- or 11th-century Cham sculpture, the makara disgorges a naga.

The Cham created freestanding sandstone sculptures in the round, as well as high and bas-relief carvings of sandstone. In general, they appear to have preferred sculpting in relief, and they excelled especially at sculpture in high relief. Cham sculpture went through a marked succession of historical styles, the foremost of which produced some of the best works of Southeast Asian art.

The subject-matter of Cham sculpture is drawn mostly from the legends and religion of Indian civilization. Many of the sculptures are representations of particular Hindu and Buddhist deities, most prominently Shiva, but also Lokesvara, Visnu, Brahma, Devi, and Shakti. Such sculptures may have served a religious purpose rather than being purely decorative. Any sculpture in the round of an important deity that is completely forward-oriented, not engaged in any particular action, and equipped with symbolic paraphernalia, would have been a candidate for ritual or devotional use. Cham sculptors also created numerous lingas, phallic posts linked symbolically with Shiva (if the cross-section is a circle) or with the trimurti (if the post is segmented, consisting of a lower square section symbolic of Brahma, a middle octagonal section symbolic of Visnu, and a top circular section symbolic of Shiva). The ritual uses of the linga are familiar from modern Hinduism.

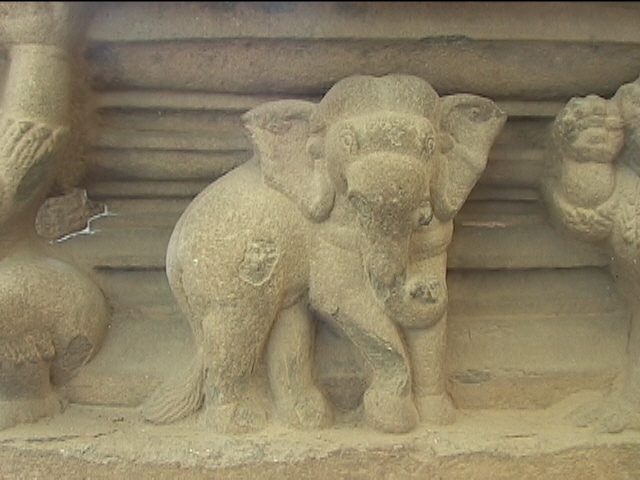
This carving of an elephant is found on a pedestal belonging to the Mỹ Sơn A1 style.

A few of the sculptures in the art of Champa depart from the Indian subject-matter to reveal something of the life of the historical Cham people. An example are the especially well-executed representations of elephants that serve as decorative details in some pieces: from written sources we know that the Cham relied on elephants for military and other purposes, since they lacked a steady supply of horses. Other sculptures reflect the cultural legacy of Greater India and express legendary themes more typical of Javanese or Cambodian art than the art of India. An example of such a theme is the motif of the makara sea-monster, which came to Champa from Java, where it is prominent in the art of the Borobudur and other temples of the same period.

== Periods and styles of Cham art ==
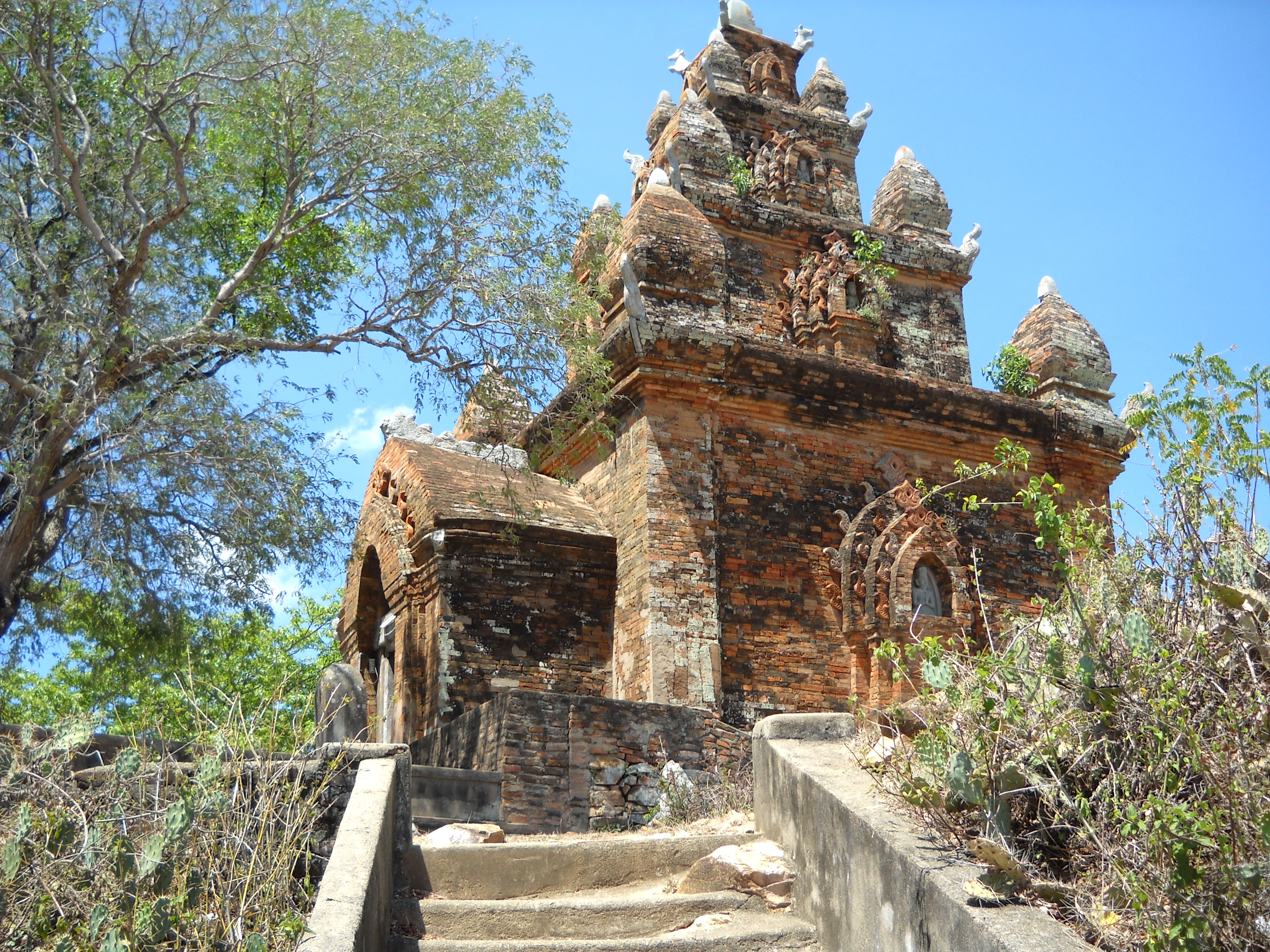
The sanctum sanctorum of king Po Rome (r. 1627-1651).

Scholars agree that it is possible to analyze the art of Champa in terms of distinct "styles" typical for various historical periods and different locations. Several have attempted through their study to set down a classification of historical styles. Perhaps the most influential of these attempts are those of the French scholars Philippe Stern (The Art of Champa (formerly Annam) and its Evolution, 1942) and Jean Boisselier (Statuary of Champa, 1963). Summarizing the conclusions of these scholars, art historian Jean-François Hubert has concluded that it is possible to distinguish at least the following styles and sub-styles:

- Mỹ Sơn E1 (7th to 8th century)
- Dong Duong (9th to 10th century)
- Mỹ Sơn A1 (10th century)
  - Khuong My (first half of 10th century)
  - Trà Kiệu (second half of 10th century)
  - Chanh Lo (end of 10th century to mid-11th century)
- Thap Mam (11th to 14th century)

Each style is named after a place in Vietnam at which works exemplative of that style have been found.

=== Mỹ Sơn E1 Style ===
The ruins at Mỹ Sơn are not all of the same style and do not all belong to the same period of Cham history. Scholars have coded the ruins to reflect the diversity of periods and styles. The earliest identifiable style has been dubbed the Mỹ Sơn E1 Style. It is named after a particular structure, which scholars refer to as Mỹ Sơn E1. Works of this style reflect foreign influence from a variety of sources, primarily from the Khmer of pre-Angkorian Cambodia, but also from the art of Dvaravati, the Javanese art of Indonesia, and of southern India.

Perhaps the most famous work of the Mỹ Sơn E1 style is a large sandstone pedestal dated from the second half of the 7th century. Originally, the pedestal had a religious function, and was used to support a huge lingam as a symbol for shiva, the primary deity in Cham religion. The pedestal itself is decorated with relief carvings featuring scenes from the lives of ascetics: ascetics playing various musical instrument, an ascetic preaching to animals, an ascetic receiving a massage. To the Cham, the pedestal symbolized Mount Kailasa, the mythological abode of shiva which also accommodated numerous forest- and cave-dwelling ascetics, just as the lingam it supported represented the god himself.

Another important work of the Mỹ Sơn E1 style is the unfinished sandstone pediment that was once affixed over the main entrance to the temple at Mỹ Sơn E1. The pediment shows the dawn of the present era according to Hindu mythology. Vishnu is reclining at the bottom of the ocean. His bed is Sesha the serpent. A lotus grows upwards from Vishnu's navel, and Brahma emerges from the lotus in order to recreate the universe.

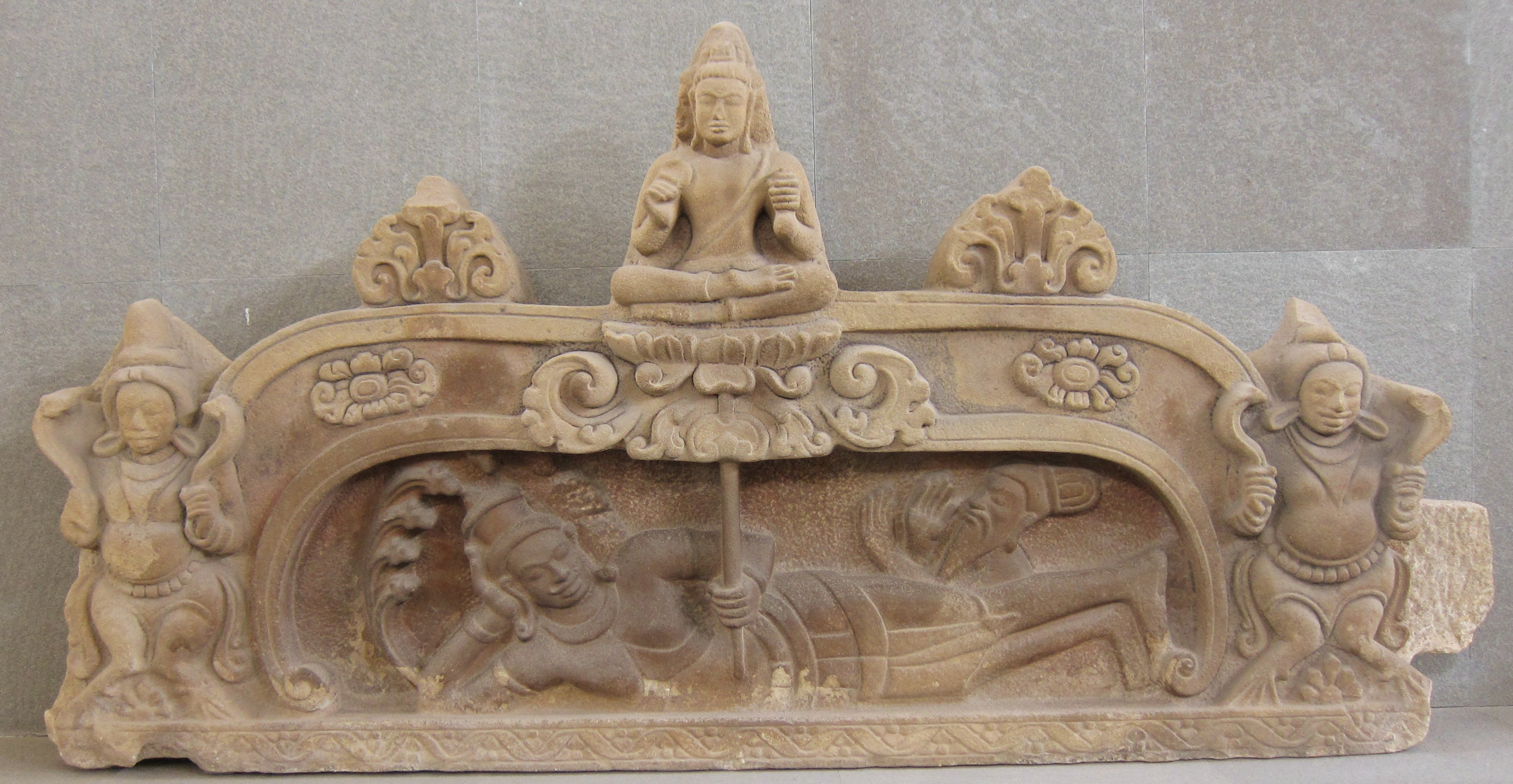
An unfinished pediment shows the birth of Brahma from a lotus growing from the navel of Vishnu.

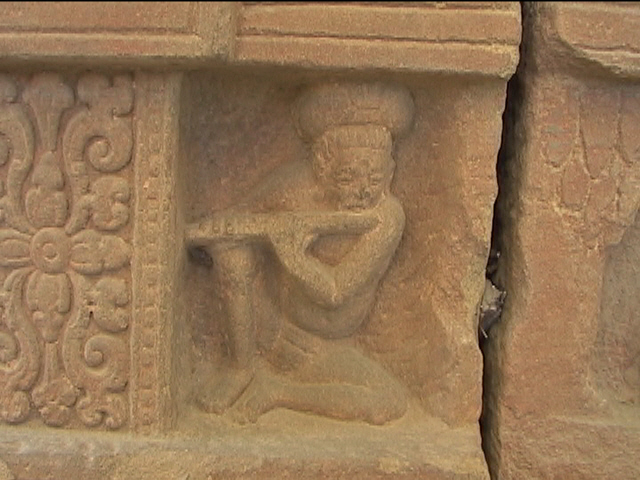
A detail from the Mỹ Sơn E1 pedestal shows a flutist playing his instrument.

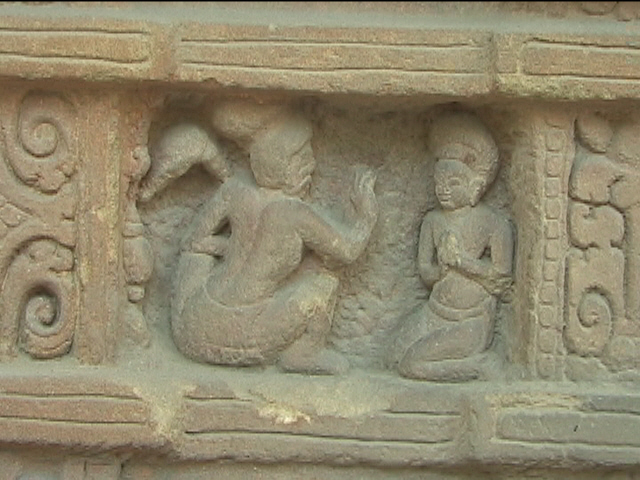
Another detail shows an ascetic holding a flywhisk and giving instruction to a disciple.

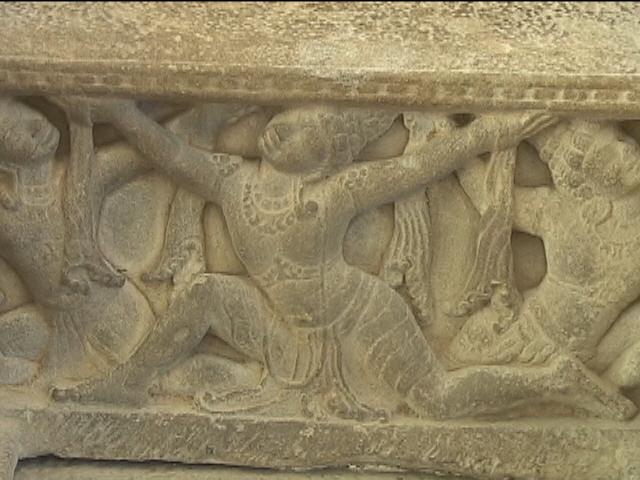
This image of a male dancer is on the riser of a step leading onto the Mỹ Sơn E1 pedestal.

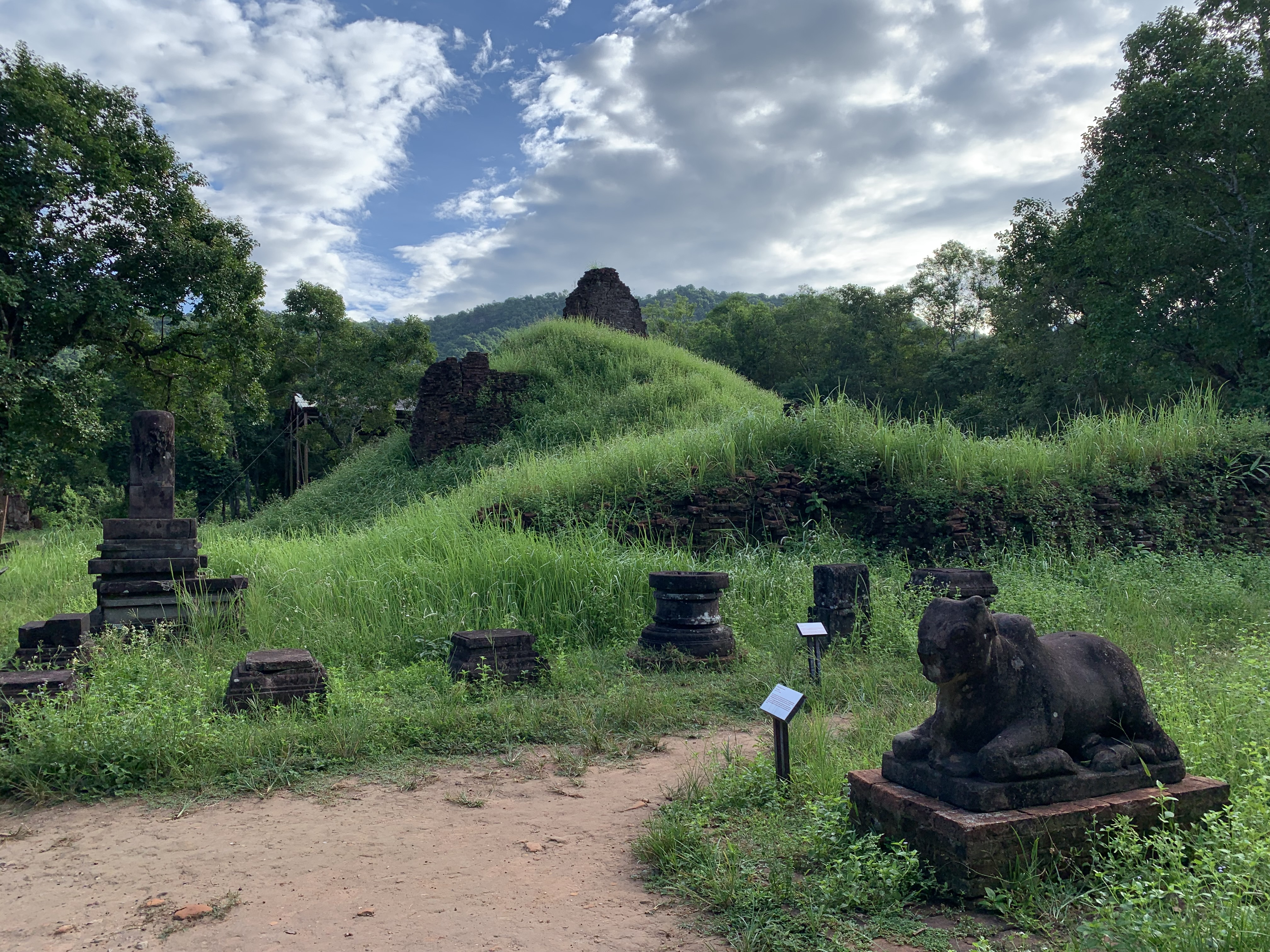
The ruins of Mỹ Sơn E1 with E4 in the background as of 2024. The structures were annihilated during the Vietnam War by US bombings

=== Dong Duong Style ===
In 875, the Cham king Indravarman II (r. ?-893) founded a new dynasty at Indrapura, in what is now the Quảng Nam region of central Vietnam. Departing from the religious traditions of his predecessors, who were predominantly Shaivists, he founded the Mahayana Buddhist monastery of Dong Duong, and dedicated the central temple to Lokesvara. The temple complex at Dong Duong having been devastated by bombing during the Vietnam War, our knowledge of its appearance is limited to the photographs and descriptions created by French scholars earlier in the 20th century. A fair number of sculptures of the period have survived, however, in the museums of Vietnam, and collectively they are known as the works of the Dong Duong Style. The style lasted until well into the 10th century.

The Dong Duong style of sculpture has been described as a highly original style of "artistic extremism", "with exaggerated, almost excessively stylized features." The figures are characterized by their thick noses and lips and by the fact that they do not smile. Prominent motifs include scenes from the life of the Buddha, Buddhist monks, dharmapalas (guardians of the Buddhist law), dvarapalas (armed temple guardians), the bodhisattva Avalokiteshvara, and the goddess of compassion Tara, who was also regarded as the shakti or spouse of Avalokiteshvara.

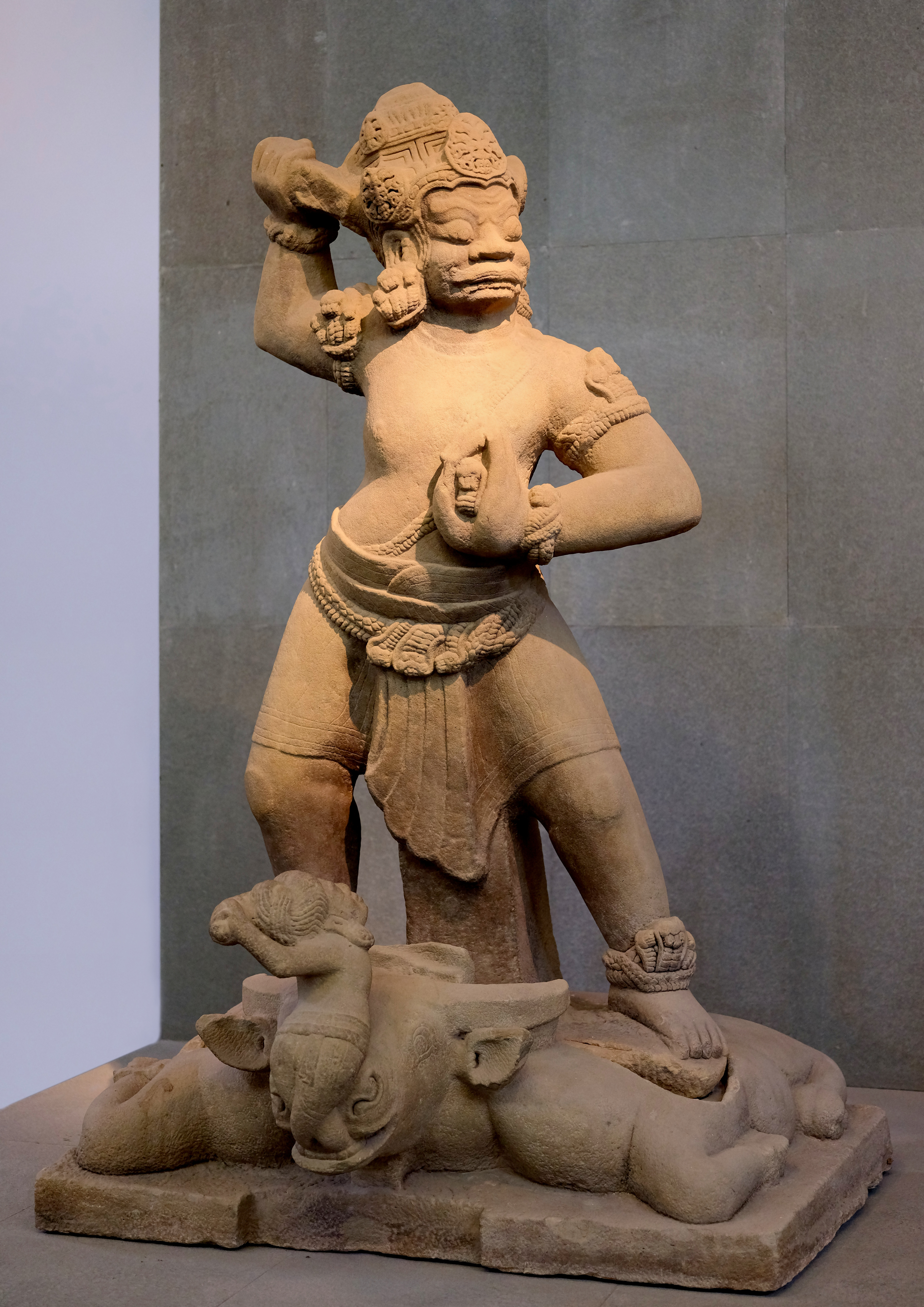
A sandstone guardian dvarapala is shown stomping on a bull, who in turn disgorges a small warrior.

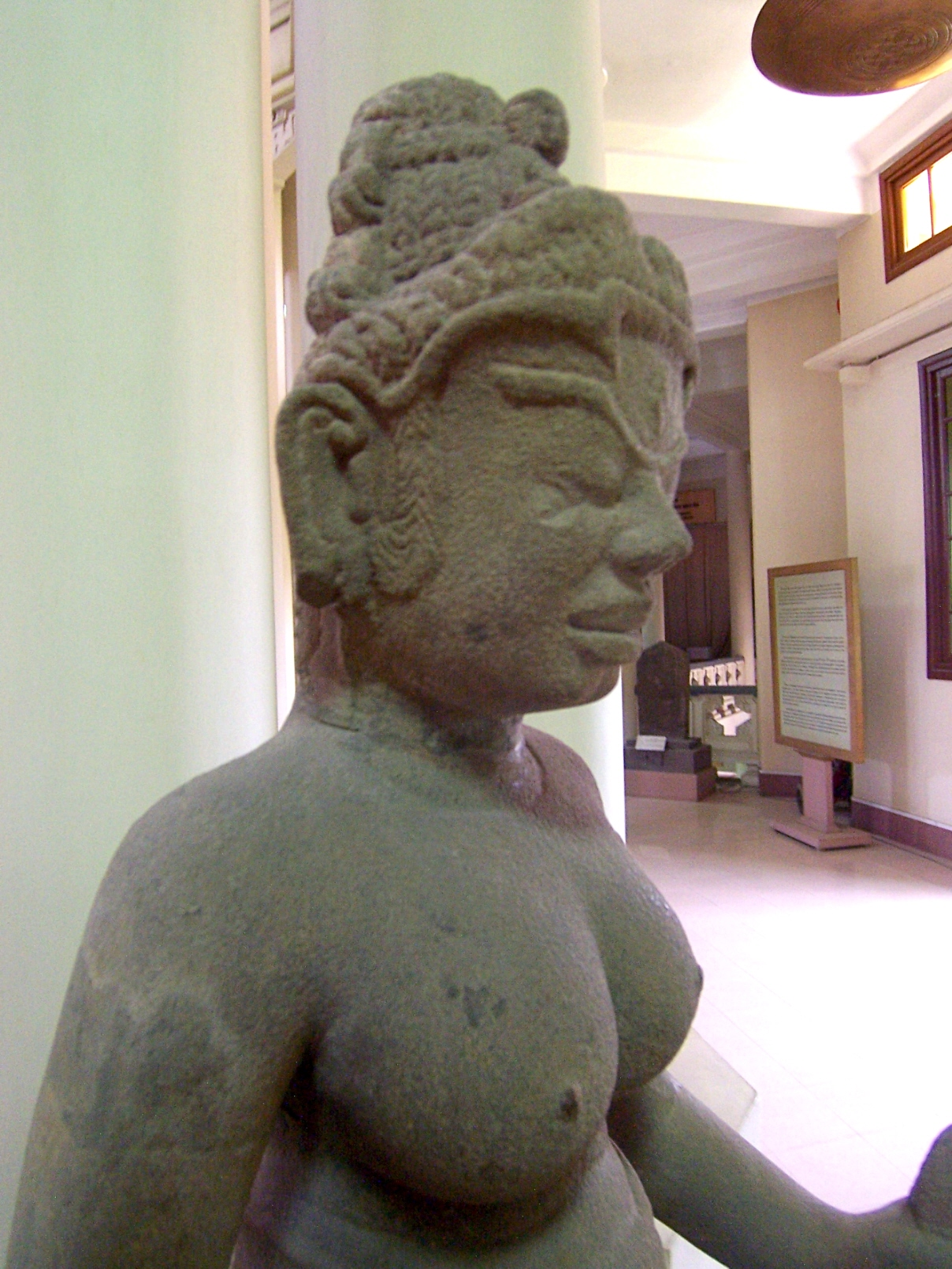
A 9th-century sandstone statue shows Tara with a small figure of Amitabha seated in her hair above the forehead.

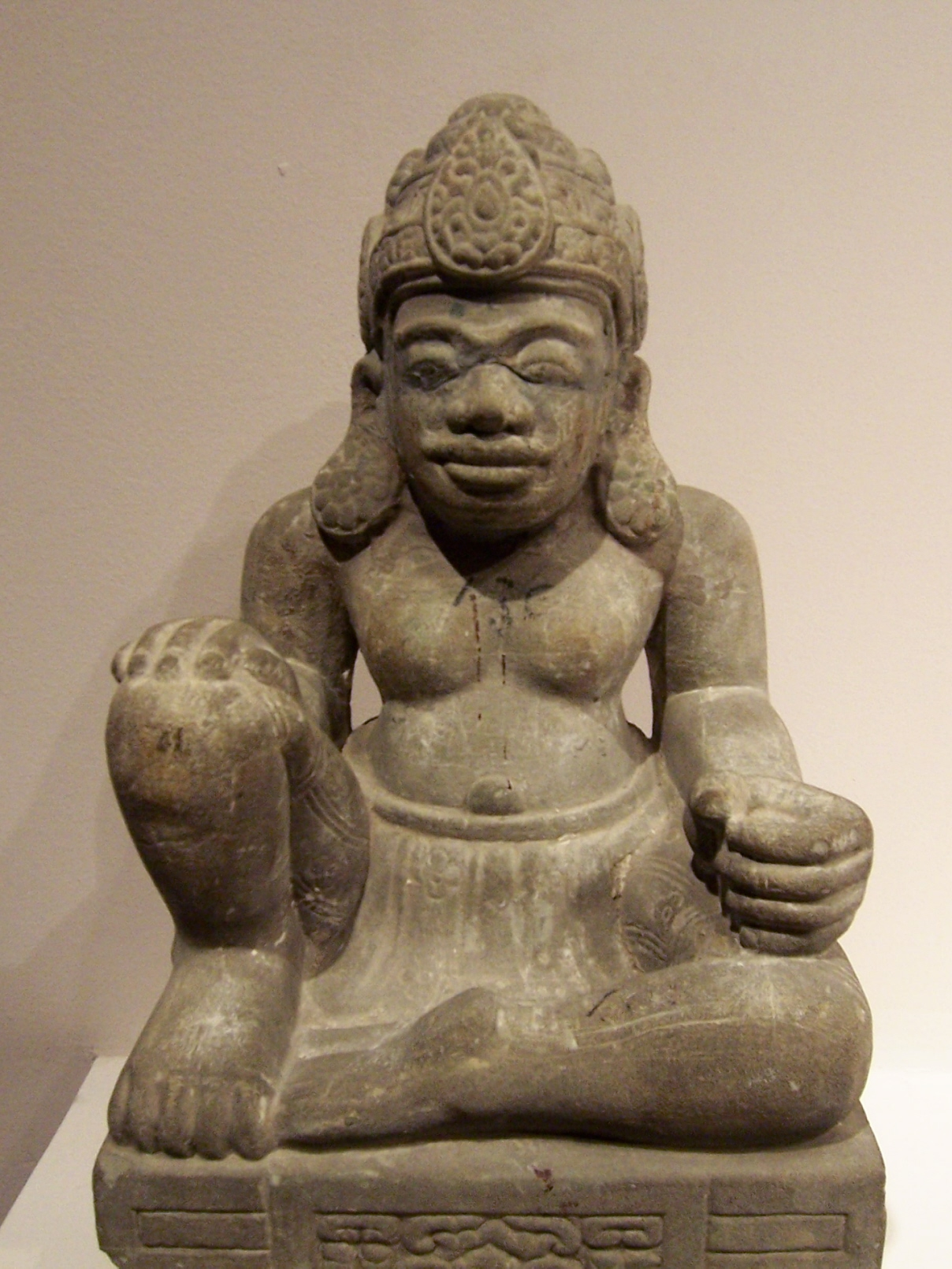
This seated figure may be a dharmapala. The pedestal below (not pictured) features an image of a kala head.

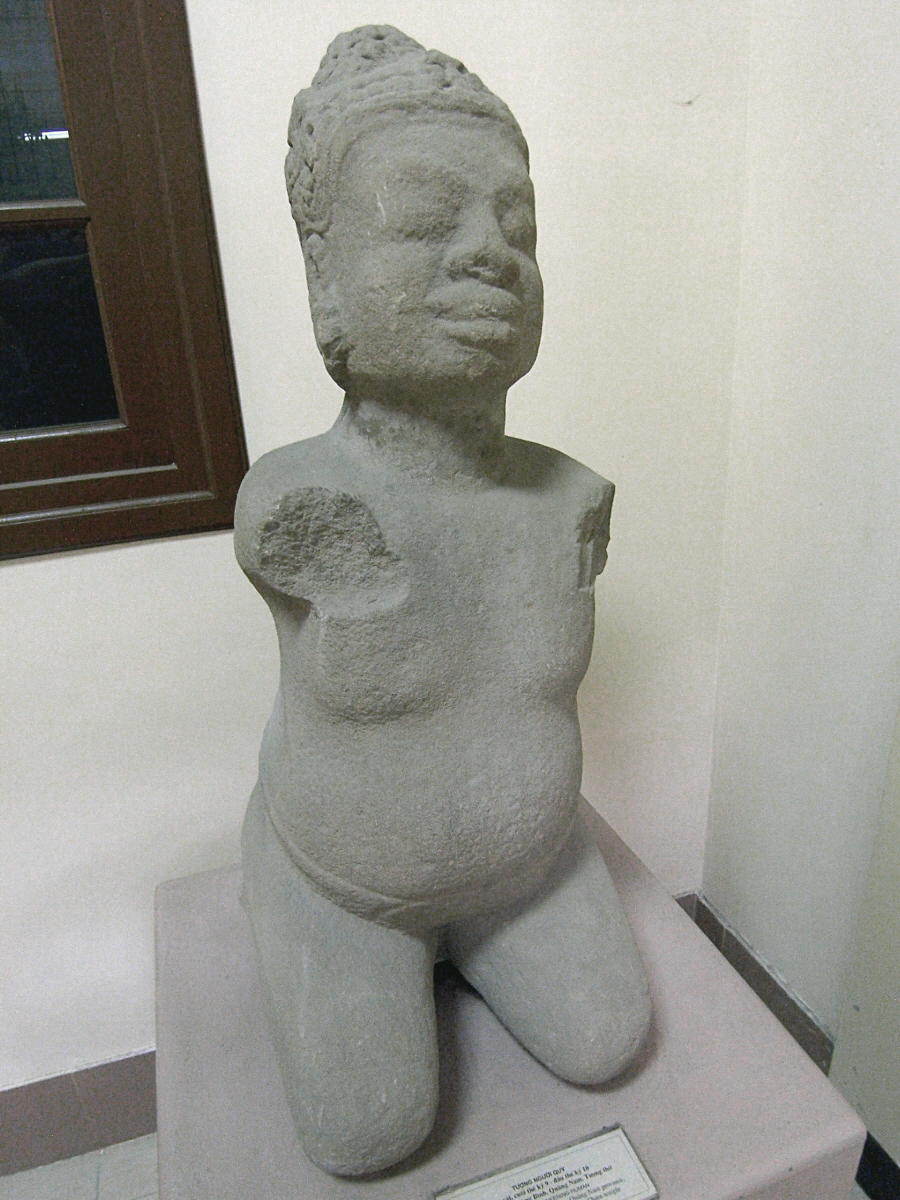
This statue of a kneeling fat man wearing a mukuta and a mustache is from the 9th century.

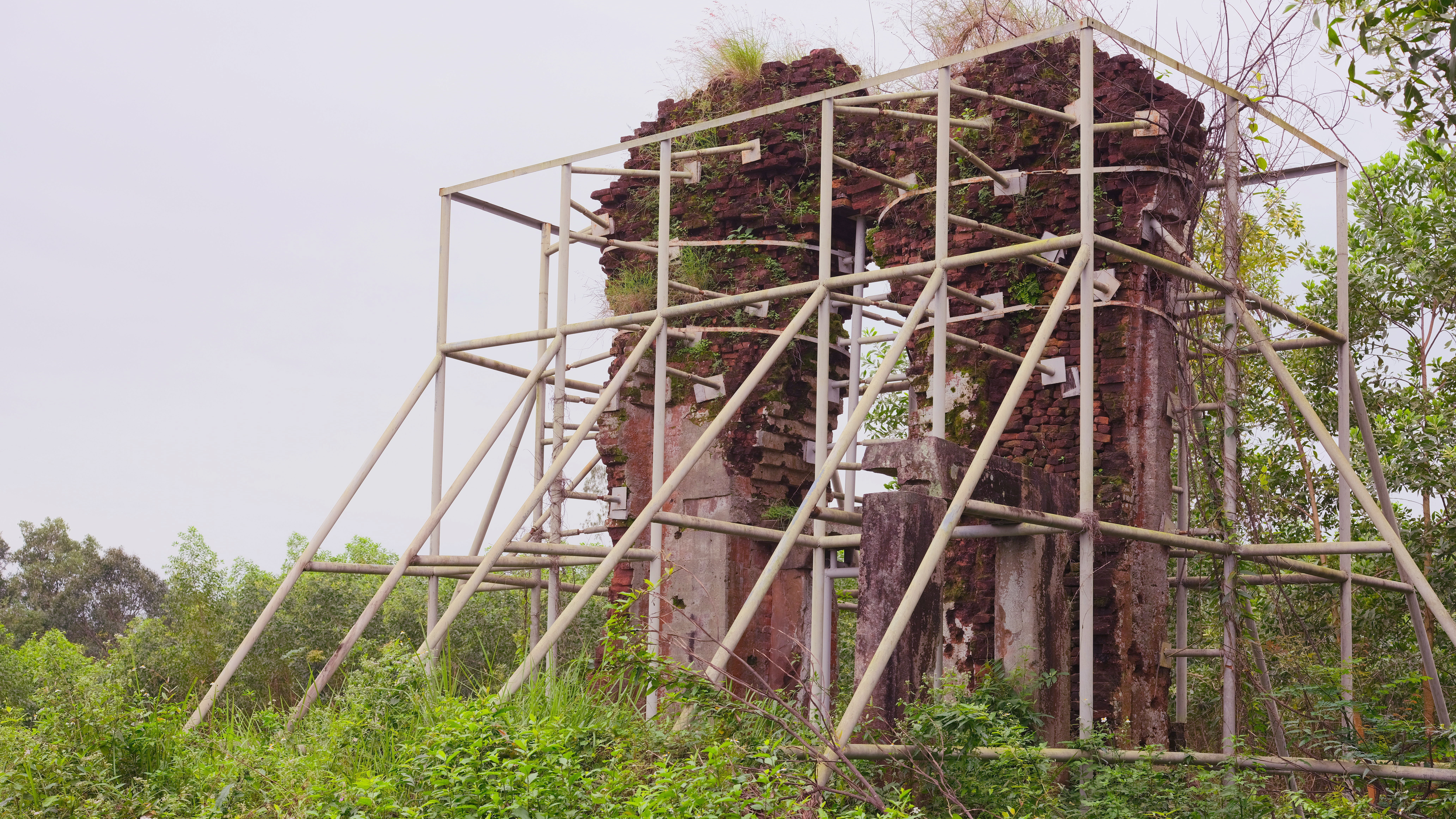
The ruins of Đồng Dương (Indrapura)

=== Mỹ Sơn A1 Style ===
The art of the Mỹ Sơn A1 style belongs to the 10th and 11th centuries, a period of Hindu revival following the Buddhist period of Dong Duong, and also a period of renewed influence from Java. This period has been called the "golden age" of Cham Art. The style is named after a temple at Mỹ Sơn, "the most perfect expression of Cham architecture" according to art historian Emmanuel Guillon, that fell victim to the Vietnam War in the 1960s. Most of the remaining monuments at Mỹ Sơn also belong to the Mỹ Sơn A1 style, including most of the constructions of groups B, C, and D.

As to the sculpture of the Mỹ Sơn A1 style, it is known as being light and graceful, in contrast with the more severe style of Dong Duong. According to Guillon, "It is an art of dance and movement, of grace, and of faces which sometimes wear a slight, almost ironic style, as though surprised by their own beauty." Indeed, dancers were a favorite motif of the Mỹ Sơn A1 sculptors. The style is also known for its fine relief images of real and mythical animals such as elephants, lions and garudas.

The Mỹ Sơn A1 style encompasses not only works of art found at Mỹ Sơn, but also works found at Khuong My and Trà Kiệu, though the latter are sometimes treated as representing distinct styles. The works of Khuong My in particular are frequently treated as transitional between the styles of Dong Duong and Mỹ Sơn A1. Likewise, works found at Chanh Lo are sometimes treated as belonging to the Mỹ Sơn A1 style and sometimes treated as transitional between the Mỹ Sơn A1 and Thap Mam styles.

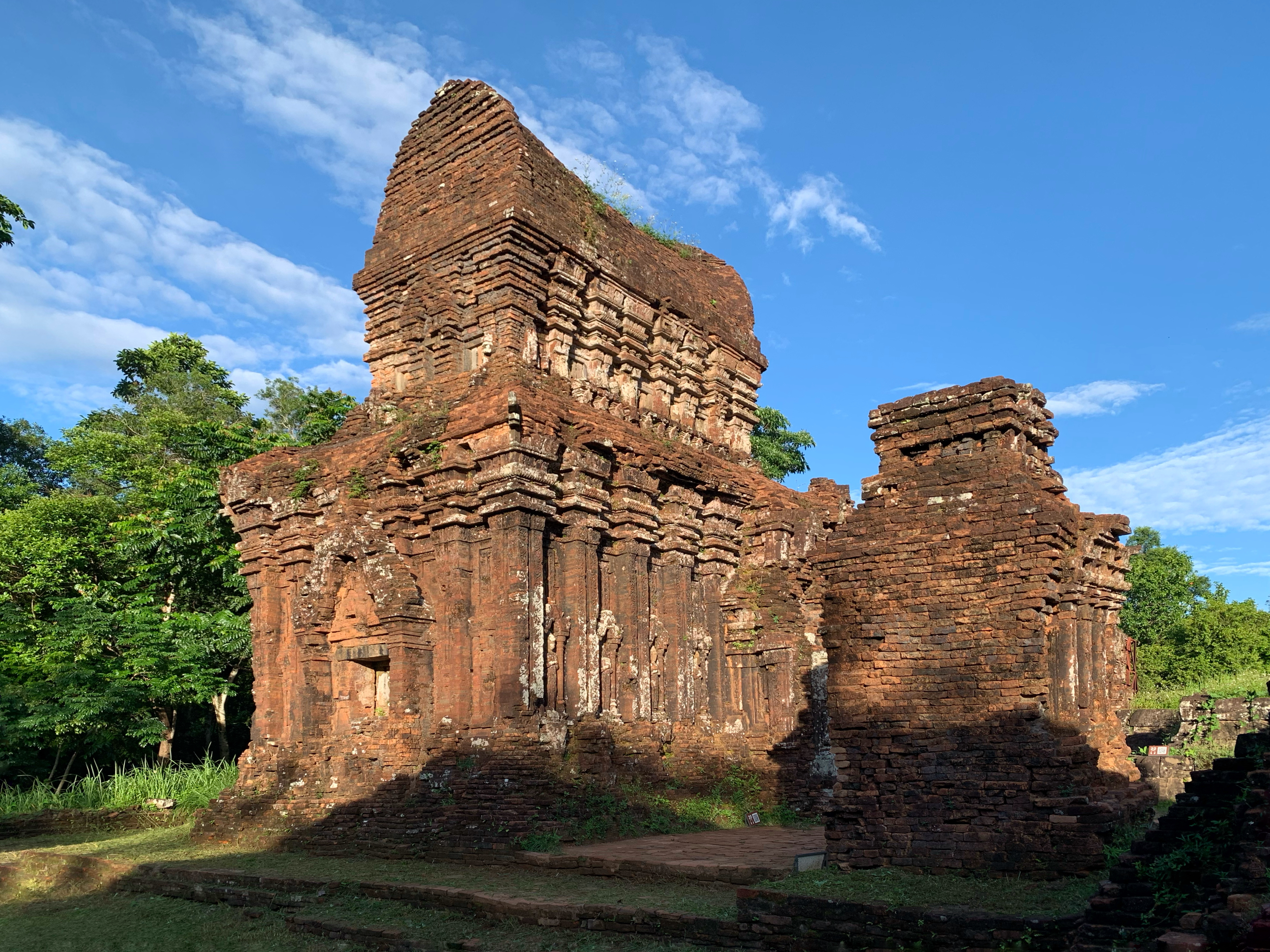
A kosagrha of Mỹ Sơn A1 style.

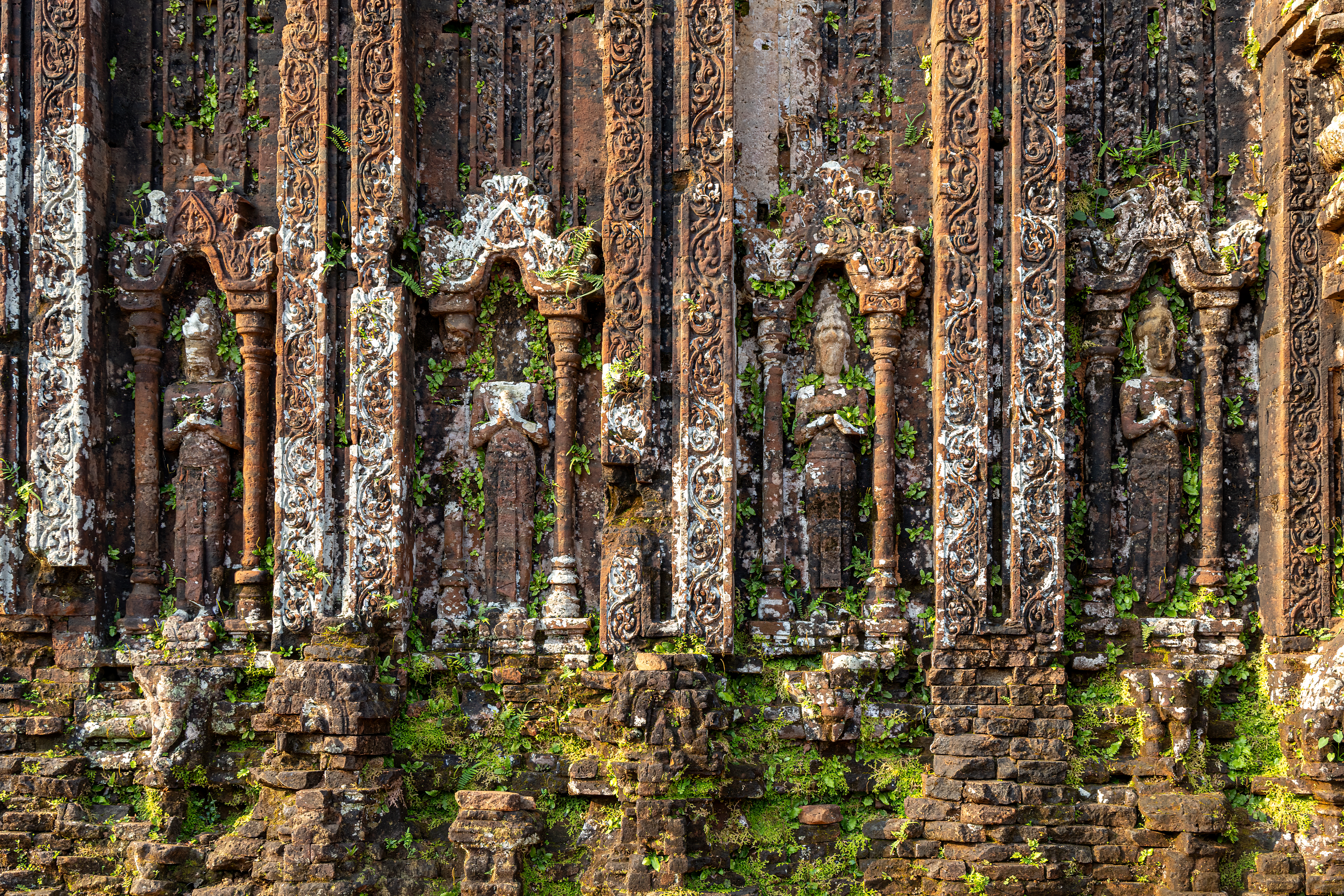
Carvings at the Mỹ Sơn B5 temple.

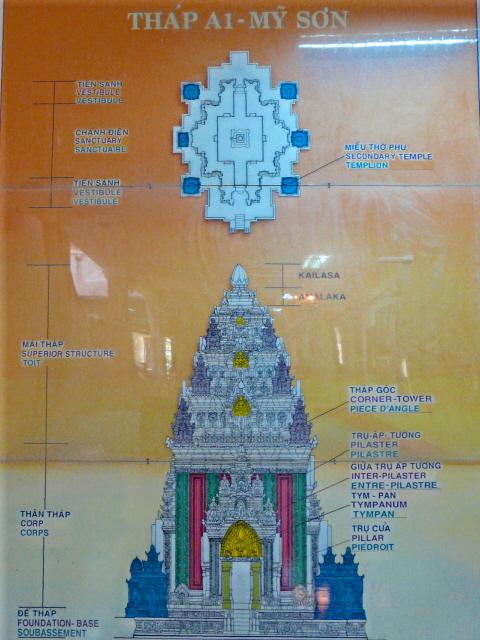
The great temple "A1" by King Sambhuvarman before its destruction during the Vietnam War.

==== Khuong My Style ====
In the village of Khuong My in the Vietnamese province of Quảng Nam stands a group of three Cham towers dating from the 10th century. The style of the towers and the artwork associated with them is transitional between the powerful style of Dong Duong and the more charming and delicate Mỹ Sơn A1 style. The style of Khuong My also exhibits Khmer and Javanese influence.

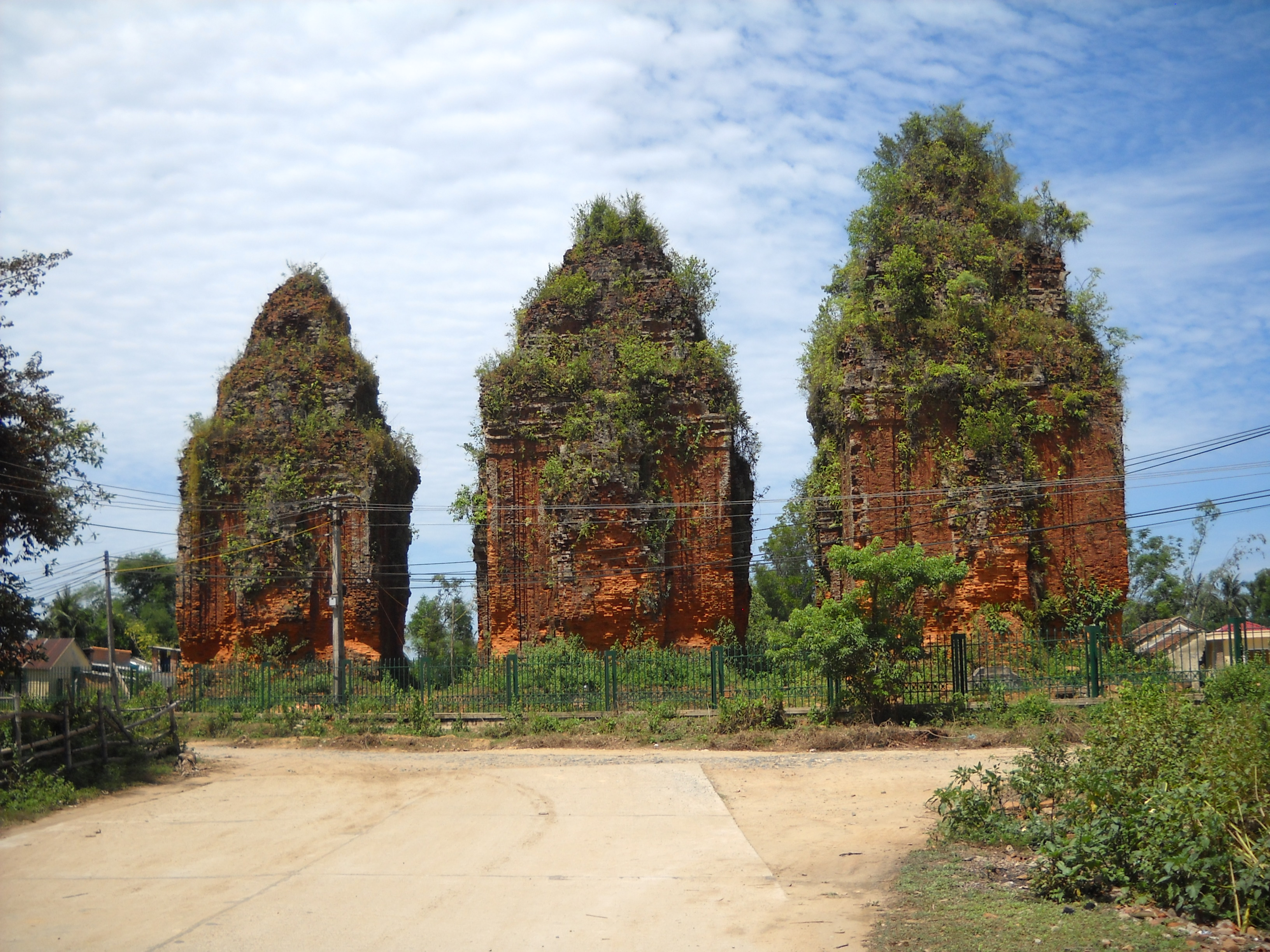
Khuong My temple.

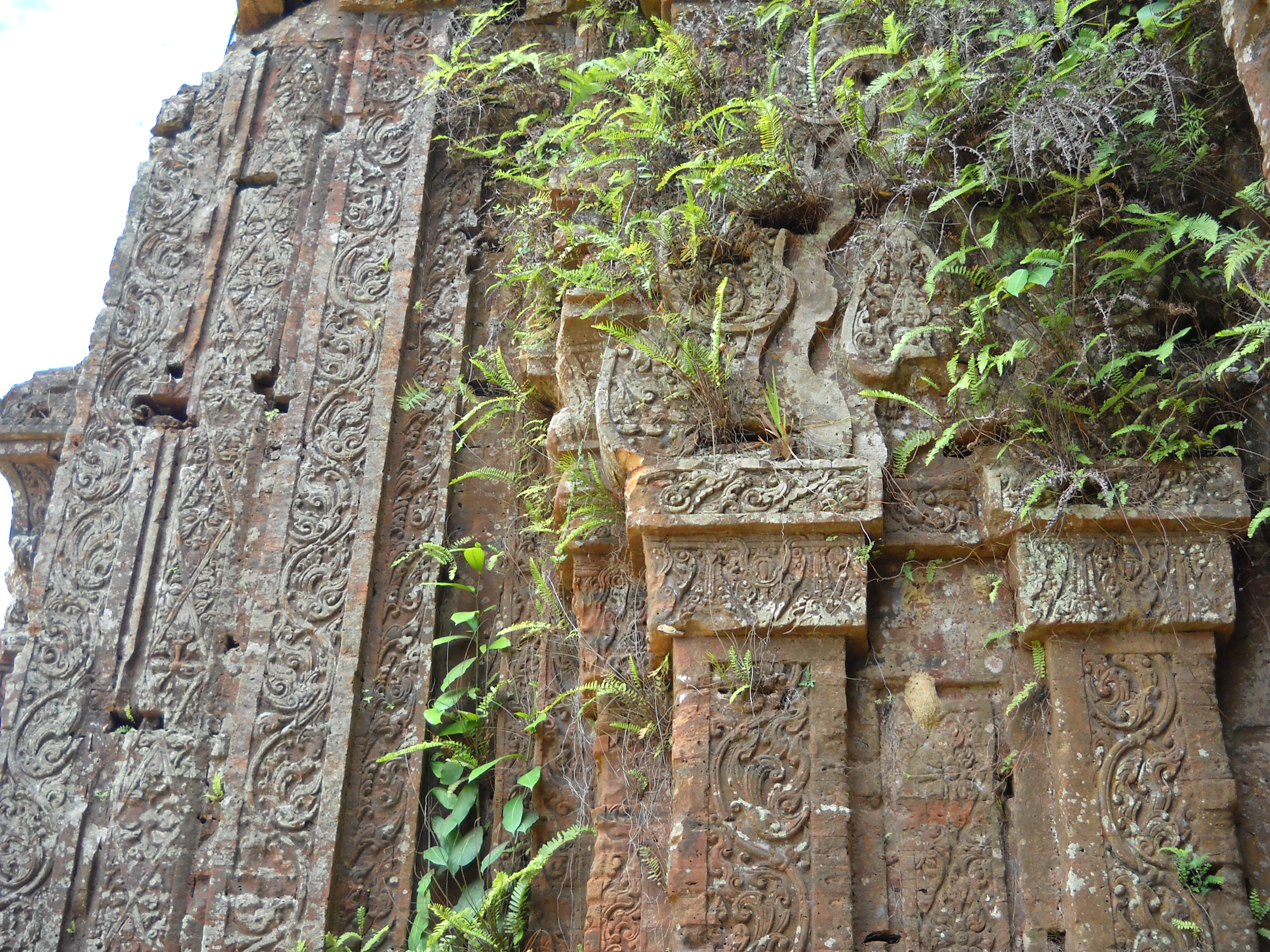
Brickwork decorations at Khuong My.

==== Trà Kiệu Style ====
Although the Cham monuments at Trà Kiệu in Quảng Nam Province have been destroyed, a number of magnificent pieces of sculpture associated with the site remain and are preserved in museums. Especially noteworthy are a large pedestal serving as a base for a lingam that is known simply as the "Trà Kiệu Pedestal" and another pedestal known as the "Dancers' Pedestal."

The Trà Kiệu Pedestal, consisting of a base decorated with friezes in bas relief, an ablutionary cistern, and a massive lingam, is regarded as one of the masterpieces of Cham art. The figures on the friezes are especially beautiful, and represent episodes from the life of Krishna as related in the Bhagavata Purana. At each corner of the pedestal, a leonine atlas appears to support the weight of the structure above him.

The Dancers' Pedestal, likewise, is regarded as a masterpiece. The purpose and function of the pedestal, which has the shape of a corner piece, remain obscure. Each side of the corner is graced by a dancing apsara and a music-playing gandharva. The base underneath these figures is adorned with leonine heads and makaras.

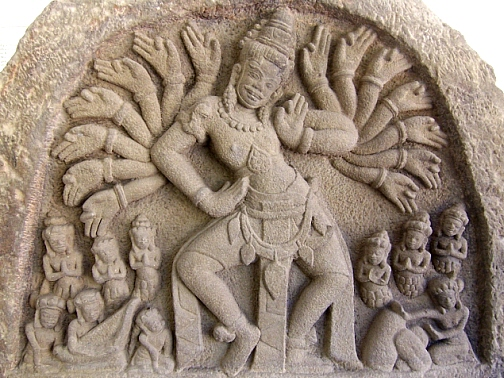
This 10th-century tympanum of the dancing Shiva is transitional between the Dong Duong and Khuong My styles.

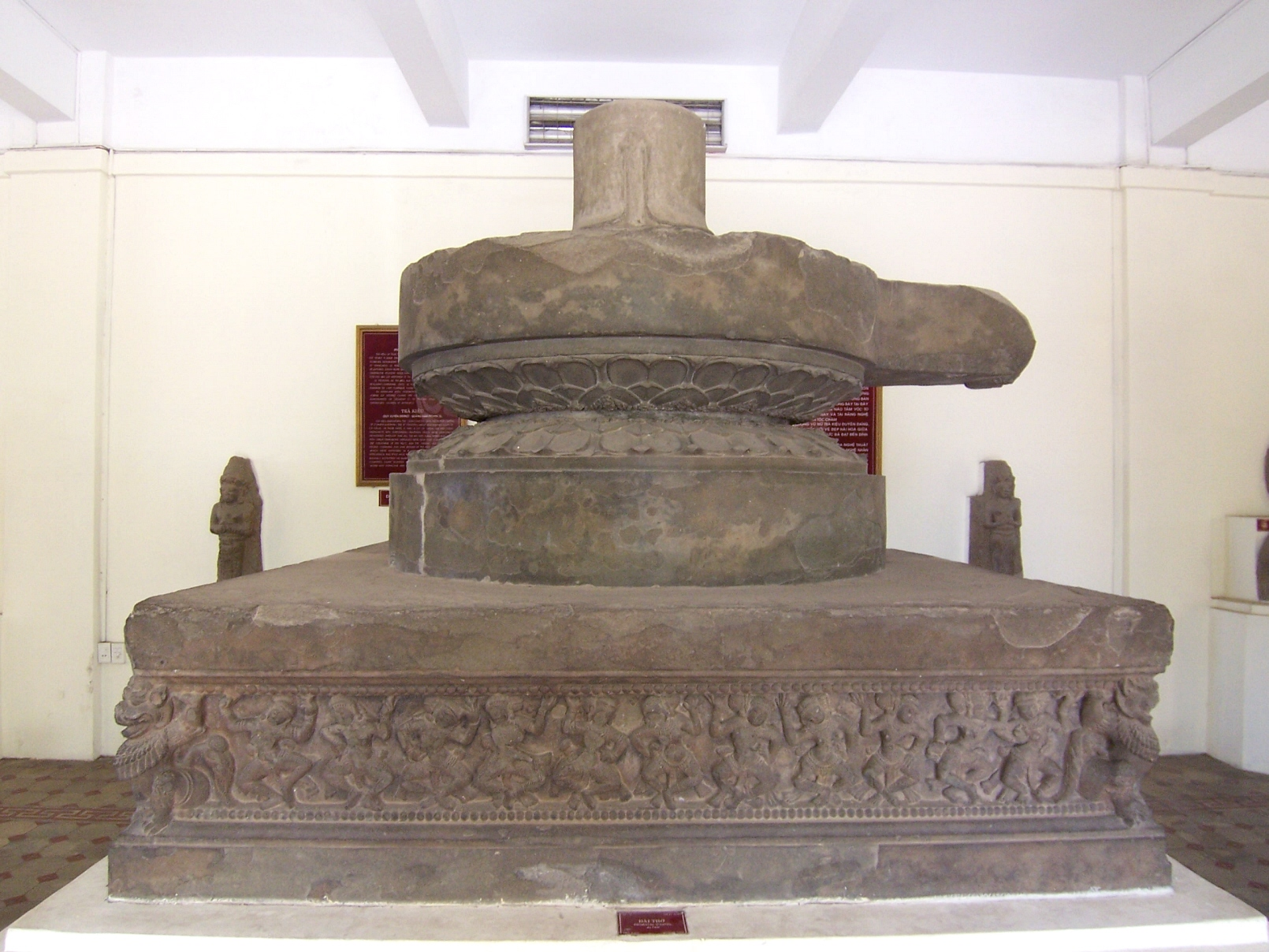
The Trà Kiệu pedestal of the 10th century supports a massive lingam and ablutionary cistern.

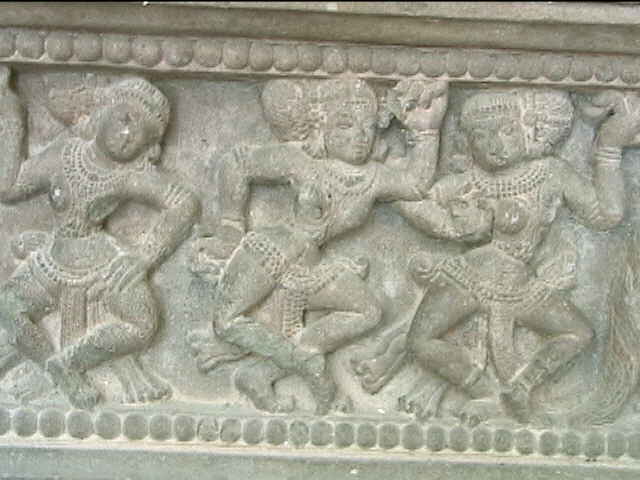
A row of apsaras, or celestial nymphs, is depicted on the base of the Trà Kiệu Pedestal.

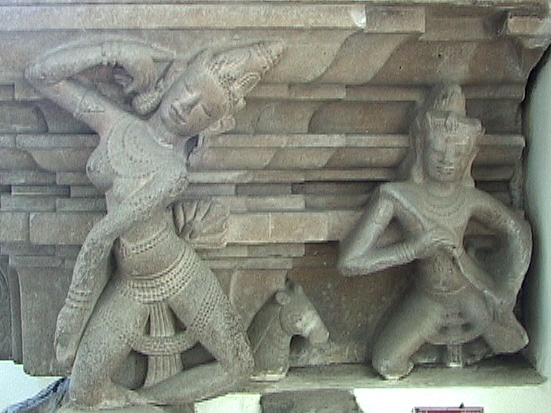
The Dancers' Pedestal of Trà Kiệu features this apsara or dancer and gandharva or musician.

=== Thap Mam Style ===
After the 10th century, Cham art went into gradual decline. Both architecture, as exemplified by the temples of Po Nagar and Po Klong Garai, and sculpture became more stereotyped and less original. Only the sculptures of mythical animals, such as the makara or the garuda, could rival their counterparts of the earlier styles.

The Thap Mam Style of the 11th through the 14th centuries is named for an archaeological site in Bình Định Province, formerly Vijaya. The sculpture of this style is characterized by "a return to hieratic formalism and the simplification of shape, leading to a certain loss of vitality." The sculptors seem to have been concerned more with the detail of ornamentation than with the grace and motion of the figures themselves. Indeed, the style has been characterized as "baroque", in reference to the proliferation of ornamental details that distinguishes it from its more "classical" predecessors.

One of the most original motifs of the Thap Mam period was the sculpting in stone of a row of female breasts around the base of a pedestal. The motif first emerged in the 10th century (the Trà Kiệu Pedestal at one point had such a row of breasts) and became characteristic of the Thap Mam Style. It appears to have no counterpart in the art of other Southeast Asian countries. Some scholars have identified this theme with figure of Uroja ("breasts"), the mythical ancestor of an 11th-century dynasty at Mỹ Sơn, and claim a connection between this Uroja and the goddess venerated at Po Nagar.

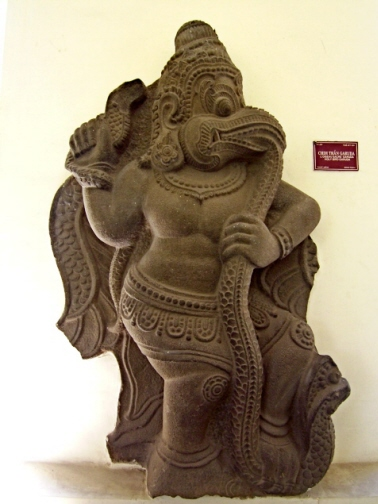
A 13th-century sculpture from Bình Định shows Garuda devouring a serpent.

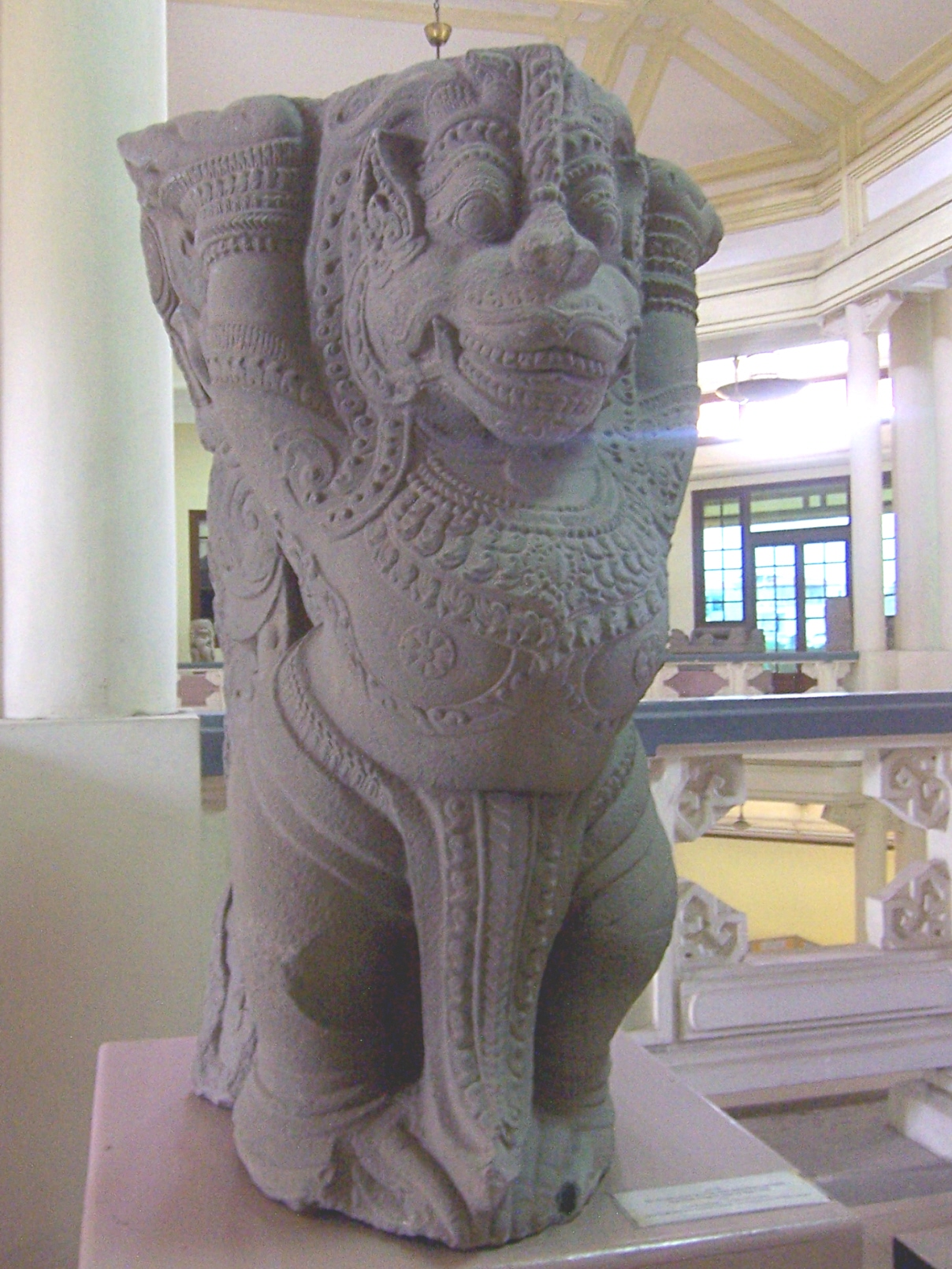
This 12th-century leonine atlas is of the Thap Mam style.

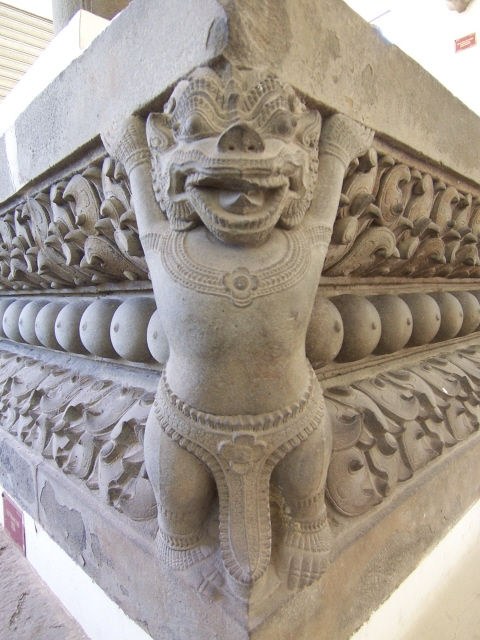
The leonine atlas at the corner of this pedestal is flanked by rows of female breasts.

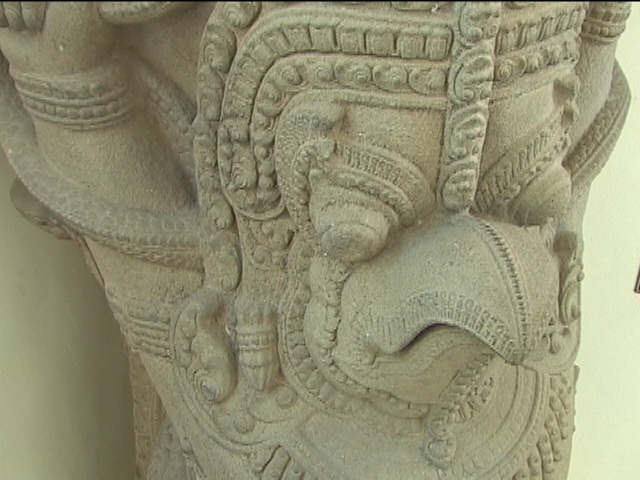
A 12th-century sculpture in the Thap Mam style depicts Garuda the man-bird, serving as an atlas.

== See also ==
- Champa
- Architecture of Cambodia
- Influence of Indian Hindu temple architecture on Southeast Asia
- History of Indian influence on Southeast Asia
