= Nicolas Fiévé =

French historian

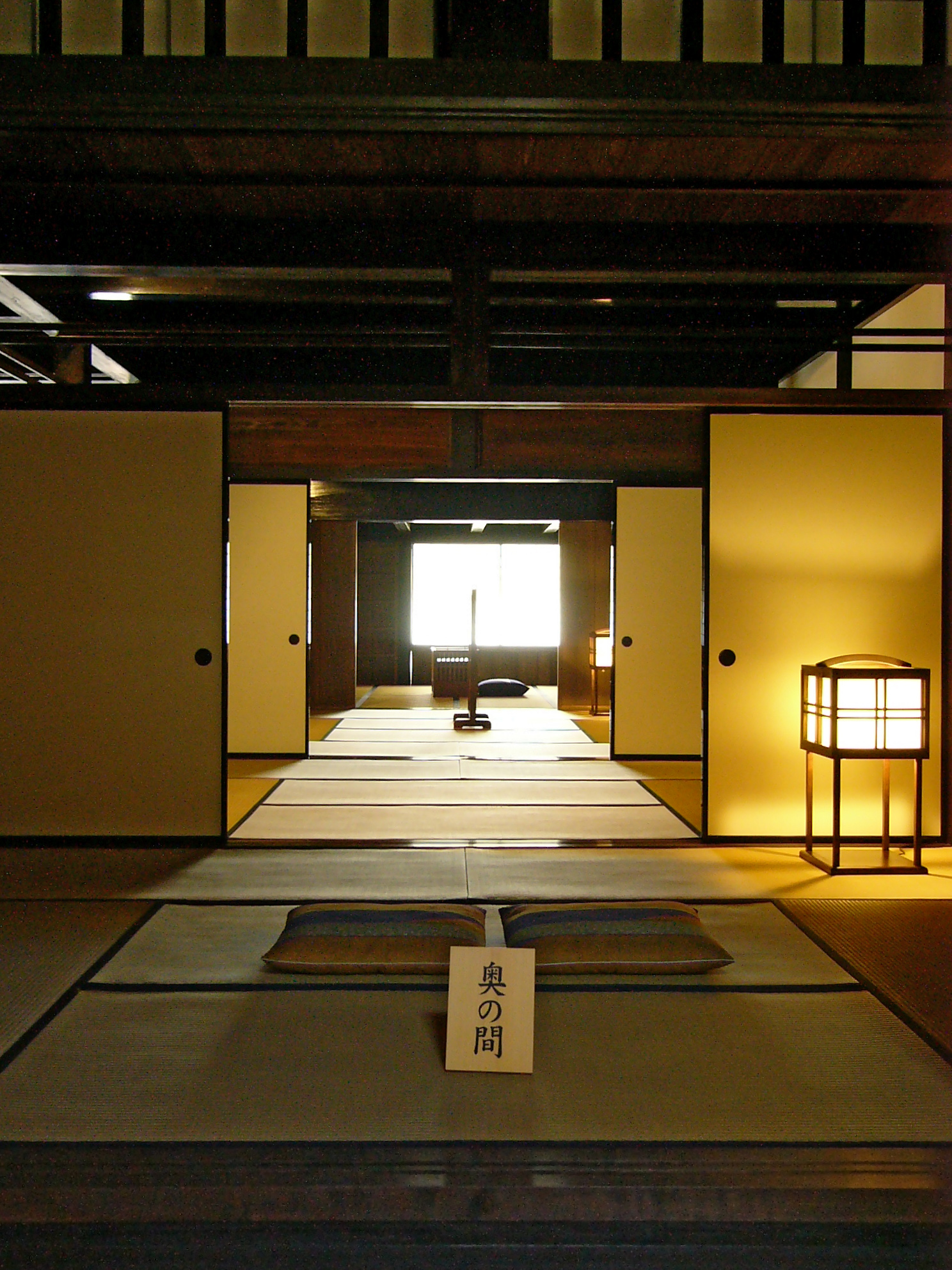
Old Okada house, Itami, Japan

Nicolas Bernard Fiévé is a French historian of Japanese Architecture; he was born in Paris in 1959 and is the son of the cinema decorator, Bernard Fiévé. In 1993, he became a member of the Centre National de la Recherche Scientifique (CNRS) and in 1996 he joined the Collège de France’s Japanese Civilization research team. In 2007, he was elected Professor at the Historical and Philological Sciences Department at the École Pratique des Hautes Études (EPHE), where he teaches the history of pre-modern (16th to 19th centuries) Japanese urbanism, architecture and gardens. He is a member of the Accademia Ambrosiana, Milan. In 2022, Nicolas Fiévé was appointed Director of the École française d'Extrême-Orient (EFEO), or French School of Asian Studies.

== Biography ==
After graduating from secondary school in literary studies, Nicolas Fiévé was admitted to the École nationale supérieure d'architecture de Paris-La Villette. In 1984, shortly after obtaining his DPLG degree and graduating as an architect, he left for Japan with a scholarship from the Japanese government, and he joined the research laboratory in Architectural Theory at the University of Kyoto led by Professor Katō Kunio 加藤邦夫, an architect and phenomenologist as well as a disciple of the modernist Masuda Tomoya 増田友也 (1914-1981) whom he had recently succeeded at the University of Kyōto and who introduced Anthropology of Architecture to Japan. When Nicolas Fiévé joined his research group, Katō Kunio was lecturing on Maurice Merleau-Ponty's Phenomenology of Perception while finishing a Japanese translation of Christian Noberg-Schulz's Roots of Modern Architecture and beginning that of Genius Loci. Under the tutelage of this remarkable master, Nicolas Fiévé undertook to study the architecture of medieval Japanese tea houses from a phenomenological perspective and began his research on medieval Japanese architecture and space.

While in Japan, Nicolas Fiévé took an avid interest in the study of Japanese and its different scripts, and upon his return to France in 1986, he decided to further his knowledge of Classical Japanese. The following year, having obtained his undergraduate degree in Japanese, he began a master's degree in Classical Japanese at the Université Paris VII where he turned out to be the only student of his class. In addition to lectures on Classical Japanese dispensed by Jacqueline Pigeot (Université Paris VII), his thesis supervisor, he also attended Jean-Noël Robert’s (EPHE) and Francine Hérail’s (EPHE) lectures in Sino-Japanese Studies. Throughout this period he earned a living working at the Paris Office of the daily Japanese newspaper Yomiuri Shimbun.

In 1988, armed with another scholarship from the Japanese government, Nicolas Fiévé returned to Japan to work again in Katō's research unit where he remained for the following five years. In 1989, Nicolas Fiévé completed his Master's thesis on the architecture of tea houses and obtained his master's degree in Japanese Studies at University Paris VII. He pursued his doctorate studies within Katō's research group at the Department of Architecture, Engineering Faculty of the University of Kyoto (1990–93), and, under the supervision of Jacqueline Pigeot, began writing his thesis (in French) on the elite classes during the Ashikaga shoguns. During this period he attended Professor Katō's lectures on major Japanese works pertaining to Japanese aesthetics and architecture, such as Masuda Tomoya's (Spiritual) Landscape of the House and Garden, Watsuji Tetsurō’s 和辻哲郎 (1889-1960) Fūdo and Kuki Shūzō’s 九鬼周造 (1848-1941) The Structure of Iki. At the time, he also worked at the Atelier Ryō run by the architect Kinoshita Ryōichi and participated in the complete survey of rural houses in the Shiga region.

Upon his return to France in 1993, Nicolas Fiévé obtained his PhD degree and title of Doctor in East Asian Studies specialized in Japanese Civilization and joined the CNRS as Researcher. He was first appointed to the Institut d’Asie Orientale in Lyon for three years before becoming a member of the Collège de France's Japanese Civilization research team, where he continues to work alongside several of his former professors: Paul Akamatsu, Francine Hérail, Jacqueline Pigeot, Jean-Noël Robert, Jean-Jacques Tschudin and Cécile Sakai. In 2006, the Japanese Civilization research team —founded as a joint research unit with the CNRS by the Collège de France professor Bernard Frank— merged with two other research units, the Chinese and Tibetan Civilizations Studies teams from the EPHE, to form the Far Eastern Civilizations research Centre (Centre de Recherche sur les Civilisations de l’Asie Orientale) or CRCAO (UMR 8155 of the CNRS in partnership with the EPHE, the Collège de France and Université Paris-Diderot). Actively involved in the creation of the CRCAO, Nicolas Fiévé was appointed the unit's Deputy Director, working alongside the archaeologist and Sinologist Alain Thote (EPHE), from 2006 to 2010, and was nominated Director, from 2014 to 2016.

In 2007, Nicolas Fiévé became a member of the History of the Modern and Contemporary World Section (Section 33) of the National Committee for Scientific Research and was also nominated Professor at the EPHE, Historical and Philological Sciences Department, where he initiated a program of lectures on the history of pre-modern Japan's architecture and gardens—the first and only of its kind in Europe. Leaving purely urban studies aside for a while, he has resumed his work on the habitat of the Japanese elite, with a focus on architectural space in the retreats and retirement villas of Japan's 17th century elite.

== Work ==
Fiévé's research hinges on two fields of study: on the one hand, the study of ancient documents (both literary and administrative, technical handbooks, maps and plans) pertaining to architecture, urbanism and landscape (including parks and gardens)—generally resulting in the establishment of lexicons and glossaries of technical vocabulary and translation of various texts— and on the other hand, in situ research, based on his experience and perception as an architect. These two complementary approaches, which are not always easy to conciliate, are the fruit of his dual training in Japanese Philology and Architectural Phenomenology.

Fiévé conducts his fieldwork using the tools he acquired through his training as an architect, i.e. physical experience of the site under study, and observation of its spaces, routes, forms, materials, scale, and temporality, together with architectural survey based on measurements, drawings and photography. In his first years as a young researcher from 1980 to 1990, Nicolas Fiévé visited hundreds of sites throughout Japan: palaces, temples, towns and gardens, with a special focus on forty or so historical tea houses. He then cross-references and combines his field research with the study of related historical documents.

In his first work on tea houses (1989), in part based on the research of the architect and historian Horiguchi Sutemi 堀口捨己 (1895-1984), Nicolas Fiévé addresses the subject of the tea houses’ architectural space through the study of writings ascribed to Takeno Jōō 武野紹鴎 (1502-1555), Sen no Rikyū 千利休 (1522-1585), Yamanoue Shōji 山上宗二 (1544-1590). His work on the tea houses may already be described as a ‘history of habitats’ or as an ‘anthropological study of historical space’ since the sources he uses were written by those who built the sites in question or occupied them in the past; thus his philological approach serves to define an anthropological perspective on space.

This dual approach that characterizes all Nicolas Fiévé's work is often inspired by that of the geographer Augustin Berque, principally in the use of mesology (the study of the mutual interrelationships between the living creatures and their biological, sociological and environmental surroundings). Nicolas Fiévé's approach differs, however, in that he always retains an architect's perspective and his historical analysis always supports the conception, underlying all his studies, that architecture first & foremost serves man.

The research method Nicolas Fiévé gradually developed takes into account the architecture, spaces and landscape of parks and gardens together with the surrounding architectural and urban landscape. Thus his work L’architecture et la ville du Japon ancien (1996) shows that the mutations in space occurring in 14th and 15th centuries Kyōto follow a process similar to that occurring in palaces and in the composition of urban areal space wherein each sub-space (neighborhood, temple, shrine, palace, house, pavilion) represents an independent unit in which the same structural contrasts are reproduced .

This work received the Mainichi Shibusawa-Claudel award and the Giles Prize from the Académie des Inscriptions et Belles-Lettres, and a laudatory review from Mack Horton (University of Berkeley). Following its publication, Nicolas Fiévé embarked on a research project that had been dear to his heart for many years: to compile a history of Kyōto combining the perspective of architectural anthropology he acquired from Katō Kunio with the historical and philological approach he inherited from Jacqueline Pigeot and Francine Hérail during his Japanese studies.

In order to carry out this flagship project, Nicolas Fiévé assembled a joint team of French researchers in Japanese Civilization –including historians Paul Akamatsu, François Macé, Mieko Macé, Nathalie Kouamé, Francine Hérail, and Charlotte von Verschuer– and Japanese specialists in architecture and urbanism –including Katō Kunio, Takahashi Yasuo, Kōzai Katsuhiko, Hirao Kazuhiko, Sendai Shōichirō and Yamasaki Masafumi. He also rallied the support of the Prodig Laboratory of CNRS that created over two hundred original maps of Kyoto for the project, which, in addition, received sponsorship from the Toyota Foundation for Research, the CNRS, the French Ministry of Culture (Architecture and Heritage Department), the UNESCO, and the World Heritage fund.

For the purposes of the project, Nicolas Fiévé returned to Kyoto in 2001 as a resident at the Kujōyama Villa in order to conduct in situ research on Kyōto's historical sites. The project, centering on the question of habitat, was developed in a broad historical perspective–from the city's origins to the present– and based on a comprehensive survey of the city's architecture and landscape. It resulted in the publication, in 2008, of the Historical Atlas of Kyoto. Spatial analysis of the memory systems of a city which received the Carroll Award from the Académie des Inscriptions et Belles-Lettres. Columbia Professor Henry Smith II's acclamatory review published in 2010 in the Monumenta Nipponica journal illustrates the Atlas’ appeal to a wide international audience of researchers in both urbanism and Japanese studies.

From June 2009 to December 2010, Nicolas Fiévé returned to Japan as part of a delegation sent to Kyoto by the École française d'Extrême-Orient, which enabled him to conduct a thorough study of thirty-six landscaped gardens –historical parks belonging to the aristocracy and daimyos of the Edo era– across the Japanese archipelago, and to assemble a vast collection of documents, including surveys, books, reproductions of old maps, and thousands of photos that have since served to illustrate his weekly lectures at the EPHE.

This field research has also resulted in his recent work on the Katsura Villa, a retreat built by the Hachijō princes in the 17th century; Fiévé's aim here is to highlight the intertwining myths that shaped the history of the site, a history born from the fundamental relationship between earth and heaven, man and the sacred. Through the study of poems pertaining to the site, he shows how the princes, invoking the genius loci of Katsura, embarked on an architectural and landscape project that was designed as an ode to the genius of past poets incarnating the most glorious moments of imperial virtue. The princes’ endeavor reflected an unprecedented renewal in landscape design that was to have a long lasting impact on the subsequent development of Japanese architecture.

== Major publications ==
- L'architecture et la ville du Japon ancien. Espace architectural de la ville de Kyōto et des résidences shōgunales aux XIV^{e} et XV^{e} siècles (Architecture and Towns of Ancient Japan: Architectural Space in the City of Kyoto and the Shoguns's Residences), Bibliothèque de l'Institut des Hautes Études Japonaises du Collège de France, Paris, Maisonneuve & Larose, 1996, 358 pages (Herbert A. Giles Prize, 1997, Shibusawa-Claudel Prize, 1997).
- Atlas historique de Kyōto. Analyse spatiale des systèmes de mémoire d’une ville, de son architecture et de ses paysages urbains (Historical Atlas of Kyōto, Spatial Analysis of the Memory Systems of a City). Foreword by Kōichirō Matsuura, Preface by Jacques Gernet, Paris, Éditions de l’UNESCO - Éditions de l’Amateur, 2008, 528 pages, 207 maps (Joseph Carroll Prize, 2002).
- with Paul Waley, Japanese Capitals in Historical Perspective: Power, Memory and Place in Kyōto, Edo and Tokyo, London, Routledge-Curzon Press. 2003, 417 pages (published in paperback in 2006).
- with Sekiko Matsuzaki-Petitmengin, ルイ･クレットマンコレクション—フランス士官が 見た近代日本のあけぼの Collection Kreitmann. L’aube du Japon moderne, vue par un officier français au cours des années 1876-1878 (The Dawn of Modern Japan as observed by a French Officer from 1876 to 1878) Institut des Hautes Études Japonaises / Équipe Civilisation japonaise du CNRS / Nihon toshokan kyōkai, Tokyo, I.R.D. shuppansha, 2005, 298 pages + 269 photos (bilingual edition).
- with Benoît Jacquet, Vers une modernité architecturale et paysagère. Modèles et savoirs partagés entre le Japon et le monde occidental, (Towards Architectural Modernity: Models & Shared Knowledge between Japan & the Western World), Paris, Collège de France, 2013, VII, 333 pages.
- "The genius loci of Katsura: literary landscapes in early modern Japan", Studies in the History of Gardens & Designed Landscapes, Special issue: Late Imperial Landscape, edited by Stephen H. Whiteman, Taylor and Francis online, 2016, p. 1-23
- with Yola Gloaguen et Benoît Jacquet (ed.), Mutations paysagères de l’espace habité au Japon. De la maison au territoire, Bibliothèque de l’Institut des hautes études japonaises, Paris, Collège de France, 2020, 380 pages.
- with Xavier Guillot (ed.), Penser la ressource en architecture, numéro thématique des Cahiers de la recherche architecturale, urbaine et paysagère, 9/11, Paris, Ministère de la culture, 2021, 361 pages.
- "Le parc Genkyūen de Hikone. Dispositif spatial et aménagement paysager d'un jardin seigneurial de l'époque d'Edo", in M. Jacob (ed.), Le jardin de la renaissance. Entre arts et sciences, Pisa, Edizioni ETS, 2022, p.157-173.
- with Aleksandra Kobiljski (dir.), Professionnal Elites of Modern Japan, coll. Bibliothèque de l’Institut des Hautes Études Japonaises, Paris, Collège de France / Institut des civilisations, 2025, 213 pages.
