= Angke Mosque =

Mosque in Tambora, Jakarta, Indonesia

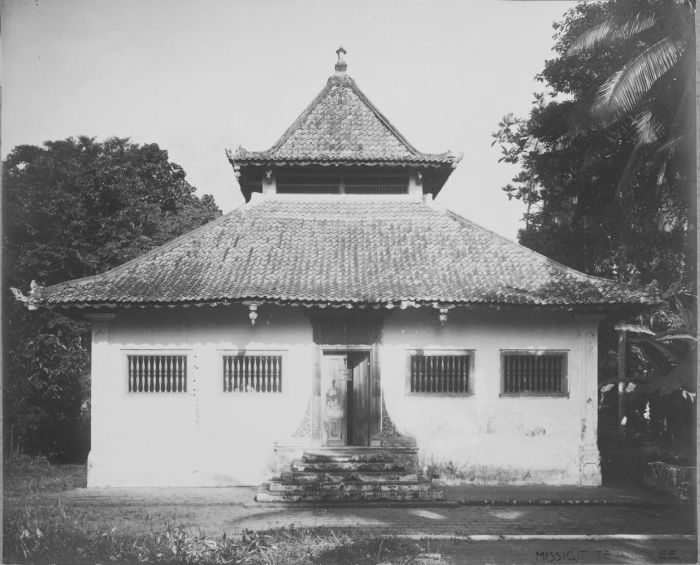

Religion
- Affiliation: Islam
- Branch/tradition: Sunni

Location
- Location: Tambora, Jakarta, Indonesia
- Interactive map of Angke Mosque
- Coordinates: 6.143371°S 106.795797°E

Architecture
- Type: Mosque

Angke Mosque, officially known as Masjid Jami Angke or Masjid Al-Anwar, located at Tambora, Jakarta, Indonesia. It is one of the oldest mosques in Jakarta. Well-maintained and retaining its original form, the mosque has been called by the historian Denys Lombard as 'une des plus élégantes de la vieille villa' (one of the most elegant of the old town). The history of the mosque reflects the multiethnic and multilayered origin of colonial Jakarta.

== History ==
The kampung settlement around the mosque was known as Kampung Goesti, as it was settled by Balinese people under the leadership of Kapitan Goesti Ktut Badulu. By the mid-eighteenth century, this community seems to have converted from their ancestral Hinduism to Islam.

The mosque was founded on April 2, 1761. Both the main benefactors of the mosque, Nyonya Tan (née Oey) and its building contractor, Syaikh Liong Tan, were mualaf (Muslim converts) who hailed from Batavia's local Chinese community.

The mosque is located close to a canal known as Angke (Hokkian ang, "blood" and ke, carcass), so called because the stream was located close to a slaughterhouse and so it was contaminated with blood and carcasses. The area is still known as Pejagalan ("slaughterhouse"). In 1856 Prince Syarif Hamid, a Sultan from Pontianak was captured by the Dutch and held at Manggadua. When he died he was buried in front of the mosque on July 17, 1858. People from Pontianak often visit his grave and many of them have decided to stay at Angke. Many Chinese in this area are devout Moslems. Many tombstones near the mosque bear Chinese as well as Arabic inscriptions. The oldest tombstones show Islamic Banten and Aceh origins.

The Angke mosque has been restored several times in recent decades, in 1970, 1985–1987 and 2016. The building is a cultural heritage protected under law.

== Architecture ==
It is the only mosque in Jakarta that has remained unaltered since it was built. Its roof is on two levels, the typical Javanese style for roofs of places of worship. The architecture of the mosque follows the form of a traditional mosque of Java, apparent in its tiered roof, but various different elements - Balinese, Chinese and Dutch - are apparent throughout the house of worship.

Balinese elements are pronounced, particularly in the mosque's window shutters. The tips of its roof take the form of a Balinese punggel, which curves up like in traditional Balinese architecture. The bracketing construction of the roof follows Chinese norms. Some of the decorative elements on the roof take the form of a Chinese lotus, a symbol of Buddhist enlightenment. Dutch colonial influences are also apparent in the main door and window ornamentation of the mosque.

The mosque is of small size, 15 x 15 m, within a land of 400 sqm.

The mosque complex contains a cemetery.

== See also ==
- Islam in Indonesia
- List of mosques in Indonesia
