= Franciscus Verellen =

Historian of medieval China

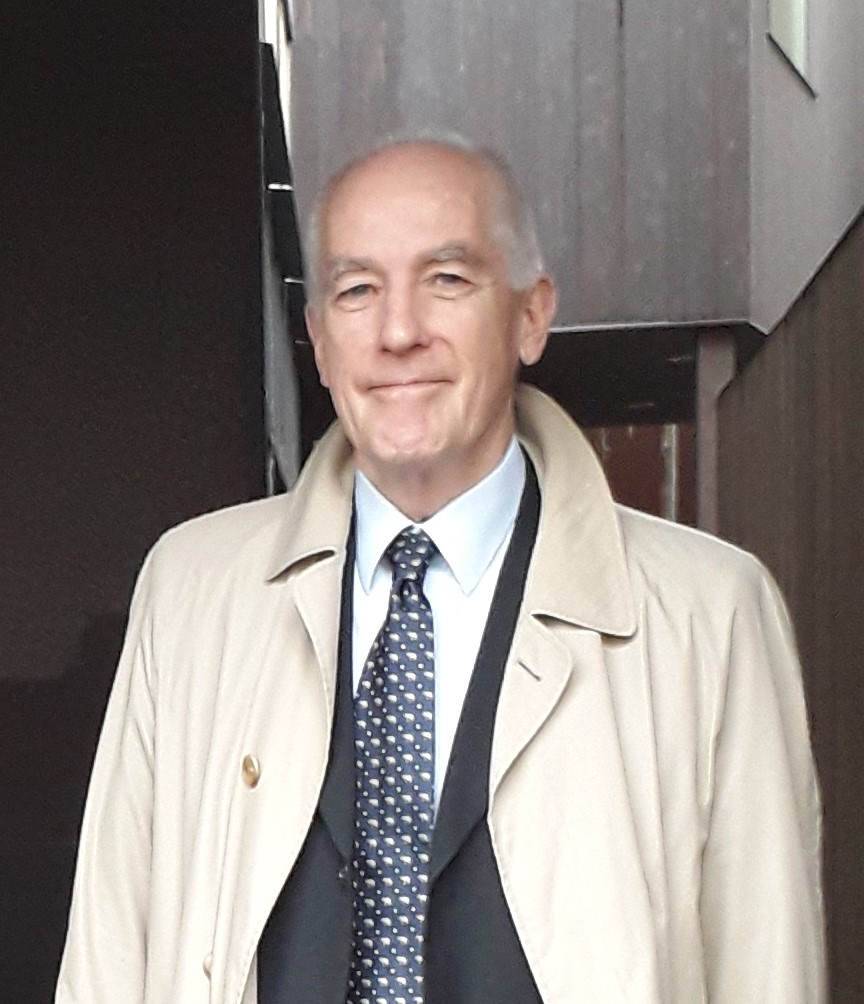
- Franciscus Verellen in front of the EFEO Centre in Kyoto in 2019.
- Born: 10 October 1952 (age 73); Sydney, Australia
- Education: University of Hamburg University of Oxford École pratique des Hautes Études (Sorbonne)
- Occupation: Professor Emeritus
- Employer: École française d’Extrême-Orient
- Notable work: The Fall of the Tang (Cambridge 2026) Imperiled Destinies (Harvard 2019) The Taoist Canon (Chicago 2004) Du Guangting (Collège de France 1989)
- Parent(s): Théophile Verellen and Sibylle Mönckeberg
- Website: https://www.efeo.fr/membre/franciscus-verellen/

Carl Franciscus Verellen is a historian of medieval China specializing in the Tang-Song transition (ninth and tenth centuries) and the religious culture of Daoism in its formative period (second to tenth centuries). He is Professor Emeritus and a former director of the École française d’Extrême-Orient.

== Career ==
After doctoral studies at the University of Oxford and the École pratique des Hautes Études (Sorbonne), Franciscus Verellen taught Chinese religions and Oriental Humanities at the École pratique des Hautes Études (1986–87) and Columbia University (1987–91). In 1991 he joined the École française d’Extrême-Orient (French School of Asian Studies) where he occupied the chair in History of Daoism from 2002 to 2021. Verellen founded and headed the School's Taipei Center (1992–95) and later directed the Hong Kong Center (2000-4 and 2014–21). He was Director of the École française d’Extrême-Orient from 2004 to 2014 and served as a board member or advisor to various French and European institutions, including Campus France and the Expert Advisory Group “Horizon 2020” to the European Commission (2013–18).

Franciscus Verellen was a visiting professor at Princeton, Berkeley, and Hong Kong. He was Distinguished Visiting Professor at McMaster University, Ontario, Princeton University Visiting Fellow and Stewart Lecturer in the Humanities, Edwin C. and Elizabeth A. Whitehead Fellow, Institute for Advanced Study, Princeton, a Fellow of the Wissenschaftskolleg zu Berlin, and a Visiting Fellow of Clare Hall, University of Cambridge. Verellen is a Life Member of the Institute of Chinese Studies, The Chinese University of Hong Kong, and of Clare Hall, Cambridge.

== Recognition ==
Franciscus Verellen was elected to the Académie des Inscriptions et Belles-Lettres in 2008 and served as its president in 2025. He was decorated with the French Légion d’honneur (2009) and Palmes académiques (2020) and received the Association of American Publishers (2005) and American Academy of Religion Awards for Excellence (2007). Verellen was made an Officer of the Royal Order of Cambodia (2007) and awarded the Medal of Sahametrei (2018) for his contributions to the conservation of Angkor made as Director of the École française d’Extrême-Orient.

== Research overview ==
Verellen's research centers on the belief system, text traditions, and ritual practices of medieval Daoism. His recent work explores the breakup of the Tang empire (618-907) and China's transition to its early modern era under the late Tang and Five Dynasties (907-65), with particular attention to religious responses to dynastic change. Beside the records of official historiography and canonical sources, Verellen's analysis draws extensively on lay religious writings, private memoirs, and informal literature.

== Principal publications ==
The Fall of the Tang (2026). The general and poet Gao Pian (821-87) was one of the most influential men in late Tang China. Drawing on previously untapped contemporary writings, this biography challenges the narrative of the Tang’s breakup presented by China’s official historians. “A powerful account of the collapse of a once-great empire through the life of a statesman-general who fought, in vain, to save it. Employing both historical and literary scholarship, Verellen masterfully reconstructs a complex and fascinating figure long buried under sediments of posthumous slander and caricature.” (Shao-yun Yang – Denison University, CUP review).

Imperiled Destinies (2019) was described as “a capstone of Daoist studies of the past half-century” (Stephen F, Teiser, HUP review). The book traces the evolution of medieval Daoist thought and practices concerning spiritual debt and retribution through eight centuries, providing “a detailed, lucid portrait of Daoist and medieval Chinese views of fate.” Explaining Daoist ritual as an instrument for acting on human fate, it “remains focused on the people who developed and performed these rituals and on the ubiquitous, very human existential problems the rituals were crafted to address.”

The Taoist Canon (2004). The joint publication with Kristofer Schipper of this collective work marked a “watershed in the history of Daoist studies.” The three-volume compendium comprehensively analyses the 1,500 texts and collections transmitted through the Repository of Daoist Scriptures of the Great Ming (1445), opening for the first time the full range of the religion's foundational writings to scholars of Daoism, students of world religions, and historians of China.

Du Guangting (1989) pioneered the study of the eminent Daoist hierarch and court divine, providing “a completely new picture of the complex and crucial changes occurring in Daoism in the ninth and in the tenth century.” In a series of separate articles Verellen portrayed the intellectual universe of Du Guangting as gleaned from his religious memoirs and personal testimony on the Tang–Five Dynasties transition.

== Selected bibliography ==
- The Fall of the Tang: Gao Pian’s Trials of Allegiance. Cambridge: Cambridge University Press, 2026.
- Imperiled Destinies: The Daoist Quest for Deliverance in Medieval China. Cambridge, MA: Harvard University Asia Center, 2019. French edition: Conjurer la destinée: rétribution et délivrance dans le taoïsme médiéval. Paris: Les Belles Lettres, 2021.
- Peinture et poésie : Séance du 24 novembre 2017 de l’Académie des Inscriptions et Belles-lettres pour célébrer le 100^{e} anniversaire de la naissance de M. Jao Tsung-I, associé étranger de l’Académie, edited with Cheng Wai-ming. Hong Kong: University of Hong Kong, 2019.
- Buddhism, Daoism, and Chinese Religion, edited with Stephen F. Teiser. Vol. 20 of Cahiers d’Extrême-Asie, 2011.
- Daoism: Religion, History and Society 道教研究學報, an annual periodical, co-founded and co-directed with Lai Chi Tim. Hong Kong: Chinese University Press, 2009-.
- The Taoist Canon: A Historical Companion to the Daozang, edited with Kristofer Schipper. 3 volumes. Chicago: University of Chicago Press, 2004
- Culte des sites et culte des saints en Chine (ed.). Vol. 10 of Cahiers d’Extrême-Asie, 1998
- “The Beyond Within: Grotto-heavens in Taoist Ritual and Cosmology.” Cahiers d’Extrême-Asie 8 (1995): 265-90.
- Die Mythologie des Taoismus. In Wörterbuch der Mythologie, edited by E. Schmalzriedt and H.W. Haussig, ser. 6, 739–863. Stuttgart: Klett-Cotta Verlag, 1994.
- Du Guangting (850-933): taoïste de cour à la fin de la Chine médiévale. Paris: Collège de France, 1989.
