= Roa Malaka =

Coordinates: 6°08′09″S 106°48′32″E

Roa Malaka is administrative village (kelurahan in Indonesian) at Tambora subdistrict, West Jakarta, Indonesia. The border of Roa Malaka are :

- Penjaringan administrative village in Penjaringan subdistrict, North Jakarta in the north
- Pekojan administrative village in the west
- Pinangsia administrative village in Taman Sari subdistrict in the east
- Tambora administrative village in the South

The zip code of this administrative village is 11230.

== Toponym ==
There are two opinions about the name of Roa Malaka. First opinion is that the name is derived from two words rawa (Indonesian for "swamp") and malaka (Indonesian name for the Indian gooseberry). In the early times, this area was the swamp and full of Indian gooseberry.

Second opinion is that the name is derived from Portuguese words Rua Malaka (Malacca Street). In the early time, this area used to be prison of the Portuguese prisoner in Batavia, who was captured by the Dutch after they managed to snatch from the hands of the Portuguese city of Malacca on January 1, 1641 Among the prisoners of war is the former governor of Malacca, Dom Luís de Sousa Martins Chichorro. The place in the Dutch language called Jonkersgracht (meaning "Duke Street"), called Rua Malacca gradually, and eventually became Roa Malaka.

== Tourist attractions ==
- Jakarta History Museum (Fatahillah Museum)
- Jakarta Old Town
