= Krendang =

Krendang is an administrative village (Indonesian: Kelurahan) in Tambora, West Jakarta. It has a lot of West Kalimantan Chinese people and so makes its name become Kampung orang-orang Kalimantan.

== History ==
Krendang is a name from the local language called Kerendem (English: Flooded), because the village has always been flooded every rainy season.

== Population ==
Many Chinese especially from West Kalimantan Chinese and Melayu live there. The majority of Chinese originate from Singkawang, Pontianak, Ketapang, Pemangkat, and so on. They have moved to Krendang since the 1970s, when one of the family members from West Kalimantan moved to there to change his/her fate and try to reduce his/her poverty in his/her hometown, West Kalimantan. All of the family members moved to Krendang when they knew one of the family member already had a job or house, although that was usually a rent house. Nowadays, the majority of Chinese have their own business such as Chinese food restaurant entrepreneurs, textile entrepreneurs or tailors.
