= Tambora, Jakarta =

District of West Jakarta, Indonesia

The district. Click for broader map and to enable varied magnification.

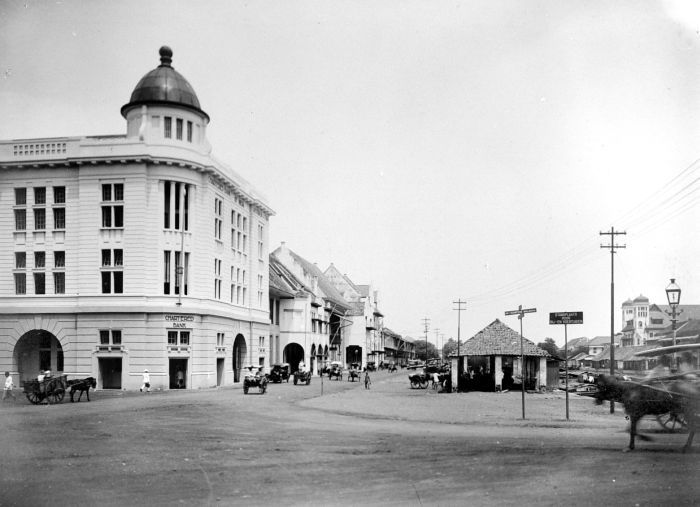
An early 20th century picture showing the area of Jakarta Old Town that is located in Tambora Subdistrict, west of Kali Besar canal. Most of these buildings, including the former Chartered Bank on the left, still exist today.

Tambora is a district (kecamatan) of West Jakarta Administrative City, Indonesia. Tambora District is bounded by a railway to the west and to the north, Kali Krukut - Kali Besar canal to the east, and Duri Selatan Road to the south.

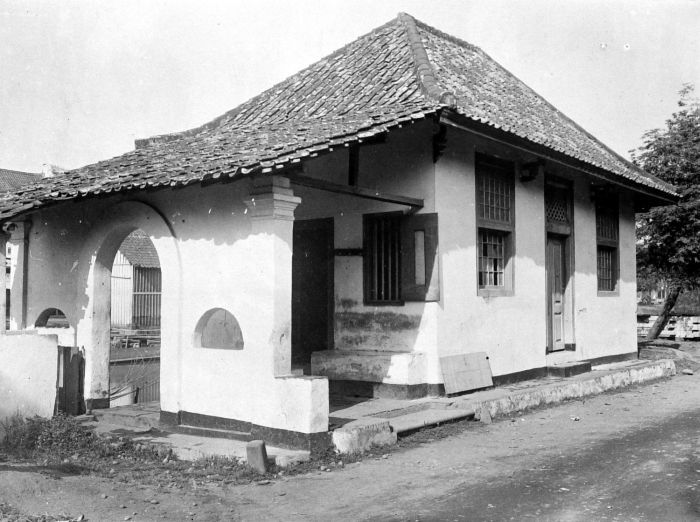
A mosque in Pekojan, cir. 1910-1921

The Roa Malaka Administrative Village of the Tambora District contains the southwestern area of Jakarta Old Town, the area on the west side of Kali Besar Canal. The area of Jakarta Old Town that was located within Tambora are generally residential areas. Notable colonial buildings are located along the Kali Besar Canal, most of them are former palaces or houses dating from the 18th century. These buildings are now mostly used as offices.

== Kelurahan (Administrative Villages) ==
The district of Tambora is divided into eleven kelurahan or administrative villages:

- Tanah Sareal
- Tambora
- Roa Malaka
- Pekojan
- Jembatan Lima
- Krendang
- Duri Utara
- Duri Selatan
- Kali Anyar
- Jembatan Besi
- Angke

== Notable sites ==
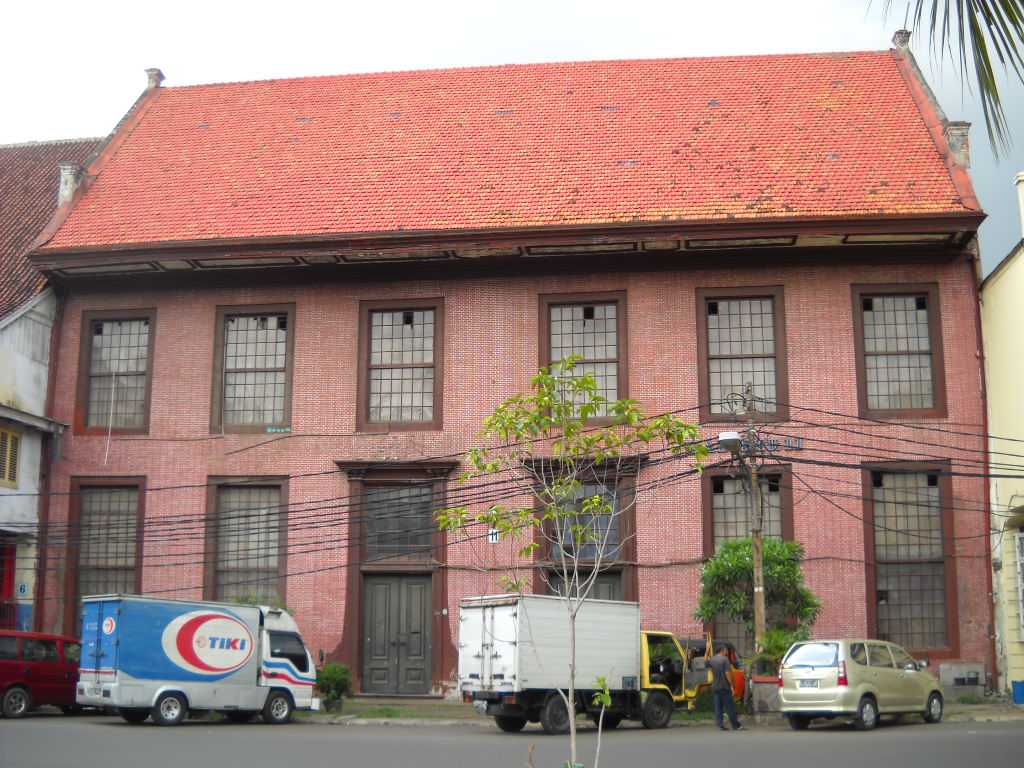
Toko Merah

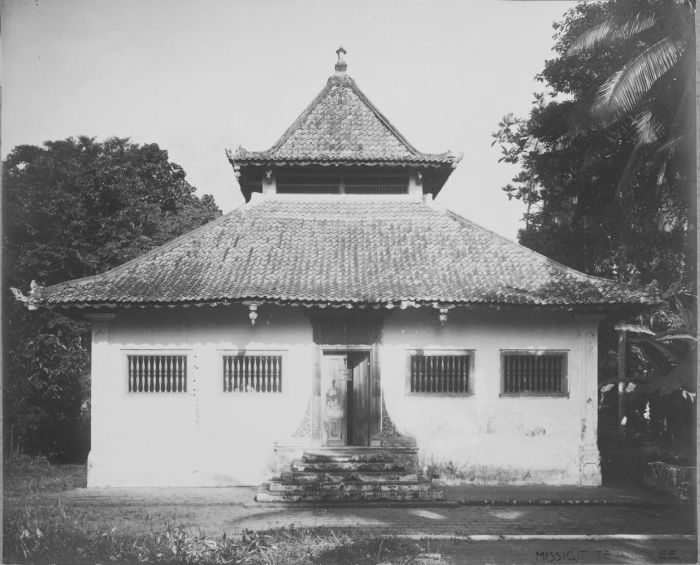
Angke Mosque, a Javanese-style mosque.

- Angke Mosque
- Masjid Al-Anshor
- Jami Kampung Baru Inpak Mosque
- Toko Merah
- Malacca Gallery
