= Al-Anshor Mosque =

Mosque in Tambora, Jakarta, Indonesia

- Masjid Al-Anshor
- Location within Indonesia

Religion
- Affiliation: Islam
- Branch/tradition: Sunni

Location
- Location: Pekojan, Tambora, West Jakarta, Jakarta, Indonesia
- Interactive map of Al-Anshor Mosque
- Coordinates: 6°08′20.5″S 106°48′24.8″E

Architecture
- Type: Mosque
- Established: 1648

The Al-Anshor Mosque (Indonesian: Masjid Al-Anshor) is arguably the oldest mosque in Jakarta, Indonesia. It is located at Pekojan, Tambora, Jakarta and was built in 1648.

== History ==
The first existence of this mosque is known from a report by a pastor to the Council of Church in 1648. At that time, the mosque of al-Anshor was not only for worship, but also as a religious school to study Koran in Kampung Pekojan. The mosque was originally founded by traders from Gujarat and Bengal who, at that time, used to visit Jakarta for trade.

According to Adolf Heuken SJ, in the book 'History of Jakarta', Yemeni and Indian Muslims were settled at Pekojan. From there they spread Islam to several areas in Jakarta, such as in Krukut, Sawah Besar, Jati Petamburan, Tanah Abang, Kwitang, Jatinegara and Cawang. Al-Anshor Mosque stands on the wakaf land of Indian Citizens with proof of certificate number: M.166 dated 18-03-92 AIW / PPAIW: W3 / 011 / c / 4/1991 dated 8-5-1991. This mosque also includes a cultural heritage protected by the government of DKI Jakarta.

Al-Anshor mosque has no minarets and domes, and is far from luxurious. It is in a densely populated settlement, the building is more like a house than a mosque. Its pillars of four straight wooden beams that serve an unadorned buffer. Although it has been built since 1648, it is difficult to determine which part of the building is still fairly original. Because after being updated in 1973 and 1985, the old style of the building was somewhat lost.

== See also ==
- Islam in Indonesia
- List of mosques in Indonesia
