= Jean-Noël Robert =

French oriental specialist of Buddhism

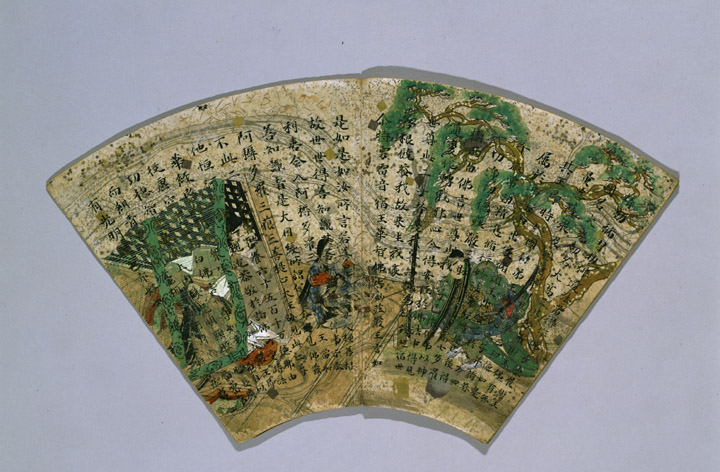
Passage of the Lotus Sutra

Jean-Noël Alexandre Robert (born 30 December 1949) is a French orientalist, specialist of the history of Buddhism in Japan and of its Chinese predecessors. His work particularly focus on Tendai and the philology of Sino-Japanese Buddhist texts. He is the author of the French translation of the Lotus Sutra, a seminal text of Mahayana Buddhism, from the original Chinese.

In 2011, he was appointed a professor at the Collège de France to become the holder of the chair Philologie de la civilisation japonaise.

== Biography ==
Robert graduated from the Institut national des langues et civilisations orientales in 1970 and was a resident of the Franco-Japanese House of Tokyo in 1974–1975. From 1975 to 1990, he worked at the French National Centre for Scientific Research. Since 1979, he has been the lecturer and director of studies at the fifth section of the École pratique des hautes études (EPHE). A doctor ès lettres of social science (1987), he was appointed director of the Institut des hautes études japonaises des Instituts d’Asie of the Collège de France in 2010. On 11 April 2011, he was appointed professor at the College of France where he became holder of the Chair of Philologie de la civilisation japonaise.

Robert is a member of numerous scientific societies and specialized committees: the Société française des études japonaises de Paris, commissions des spécialistes of the Institut national des langues et civilisations orientales at Paris Diderot University, commission scientifique of the École pratique des hautes études (5th section), counsellor of the Société Asiatique, board of the French School of the Far East.

Robert is editor of Hôbôgirin, an encyclopaedia of Buddhism from the Chinese and Japanese sources, and member of the editorial and scientific committees of the Japan Review, the Journal asiatique and the Religions & Histoire journal. He was elected on 17 March 2006, member of the Académie des Inscriptions et Belles-Lettres at the chair of André Caquot. He also writes in Latin, under the pseudonym Alexander Ricius.

== Honours and awards ==
=== Honours ===
- Knight of the Legion of Honour (France)
- Officier of the Ordre national du Mérite (France)
- Commander of the Ordre des Palmes académiques (France)
- Gold and Silver Star of the Order of the Rising Sun (Japan)

=== Awards ===
- 2023 : Medal of the Collège de France
- 2021 : Medal of the International Prize in Japanese Studies (Japon)

== Publications ==
- 1986: Lectures élémentaires en style sino-japonais (kanbun)
- 1990: Doctrines de l’école japonaise Tendai au début du IXe : Gishin et le Hokke-shû gi shû (doctorate thesis)
- 1995: Contempler le sanctuaire du cœur : le bouddhisme vu par un bouddhologue français, published in Japanese in 1997
- 2001: Kanbun for the XXIst Century : The Future of Dead Languages (in Japanese)
- 2003: Sûtra du Lotus, suivi du Livre des sens innombrables et du Livre de la contemplation de Sage-Universel (translation)
- 2007: Quatre courts traités sur la Terrasse Céleste, Fayard, series "Trésors du bouddhisme", ISBN 9782213634227
- 2008: Petite histoire du bouddhisme, Librio Document ISBN 9782290002254
- 2008: La Centurie du Lotus : poèmes de Jien (1155-1225) sur le Sûtra du Lotus
- 2012: La hiéroglossie japonaise
- 2023: Des langues et des dieux au Japon
