= Jami Kampung Baru Inpak Mosque =

Mosque in Tambora, Jakarta, Indonesia

- Masjid Jami Kampung Baru Inpak
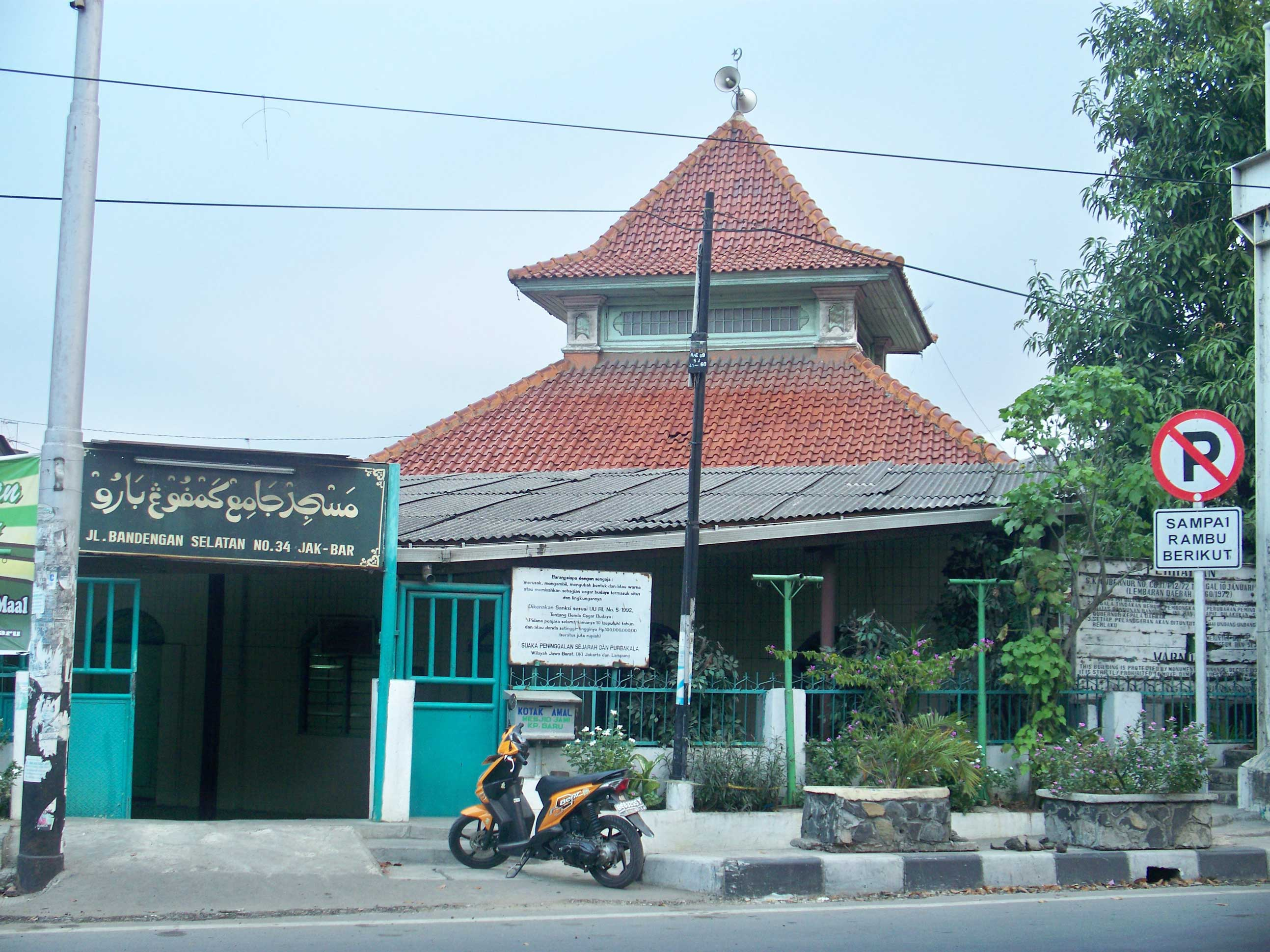

Religion
- Affiliation: Islam
- Branch/tradition: Sunni

Location
- Location: Tambora, Jakarta, Indonesia
- Interactive map of Jami Kampung Baru Inpak Mosque
- Coordinates: 6.136573°S 106.802767°E

Architecture
- Type: Mosque
- Groundbreaking: 1743
- Completed: 1748

Masjid Jami Kampung Baru Inpak, also known as Masjid Kampung Baru or Bandengan Mosque, is one of the oldest mosques in Jakarta, Indonesia. It is located at Jalan Bandengan Selatan, Pekojan, Tambora, Jakarta. It is one of the mosques that was built by Muslim merchants from India who used to travel to and live in Batavia. The mosque has been designated as cultural heritage by the provincial government of DKI Jakarta.

== History ==
The traders and merchants from Arabia and India settled in this region of then Batavia. Traders from India built a mosque in the area to meet their need to perform worship in congregation. Jami Kampung Baru Mosque was built by Syeikh Abubakar who is one of the Muslim merchants from India and who lived in the area. Construction began in 1743 and completed in 1748. In a Dutch article in 1829 the New Kampong mosque is also called the Moorsche Tempel (Temple of the Moors). It is probably from this historical origin that the mosque was built by Muslim Moors, later the Moorish term is identified as Indian Muslims. Although Moorish terminology use to identify a Muslim ethnic group in North Africa (Morocco and its surroundings), who in his time succeeded in conquering Europe and establishing an empire of Islam in Andalusia (Spain).

== Architecture ==
At present the building is not in the original shape, except the remaining keranka central square, carved setandan grapes and some pillars on the windows. In the late 1980s, the old buildings in Pekojan area were dismantled for a flyover. Kampung Baru Mosque also suffered damage from the improvement effort regardless of historical values and architecture. The basic plan of the mosque is in the form of a square with a roof overlap (overlapping), the upper roof is a pyramid shape. The shape of this mosque resembles traditional Javanese building forms, where there are usually 4 pillars of soko guru in the middle of the building as a buffer of the pyramid-shaped roof.

The area of the mosque is about 1,050 square meters, the floor is covered with a white-colored head and over it spread a green colored mat and partly red colored bewarna. In the sky the mosque hangs an antic lamp that has been there since the mosque was standing. This mosque once had the most beautiful pulpit, made of carved wood. The pulpit has been replaced. The original pulpit is now stored in the Jakarta History Museum.

== See also ==
- List of mosques in Indonesia
