= Francine Hérail =

French historian specializing in Japan

Francine Hérail is a French historian specializing in Japan. Former resident at the Maison franco-japonaise in Tokyo, she was professor at the Institut national des langues et civilisations orientales until 1981, then director of studies at the École pratique des hautes études (IVe section, chaire d'histoire et philologie japonaises) until 1998.

== Bibliography ==
=== Books ===
- Yodo no tsukai ou le système des Quatre Envoyés, Bulletin de la Maison franco-japonaise, tome VIII, n° 2, Paris, Presses universitaires de France, 1966, 215 p.
- Histoire du Japon des origines à Meiji, Paris, Publications orientalistes de France, 1986, 462 p. ISBN 978-2716902380.
- Fonctions et fonctionnaires japonais au début du XIe, Paris, Publications orientalistes de France, 1977, 2 tomes, 930 p., réédition sous le titre La Cour et l’Administration du Japon à l’époque de Heian, Droz, 2006, 793 p. ASIN B005KQ3I1M.
- Bibliographie japonaise, Paris, Publications orientalistes de France, 1986, 334 p.
- Notes journalières de Fujiwara no Michinaga (995-1018), translation of the Midō Kanpakuki, Geneva and Paris, Droz, 1987, 1988 et 1991, (volume 1: 640 p. ; volume 2: 782 p. ; volume 3: 772 p.).
- Poèmes de Fujiwara no Michinaga, ministre à la cour de Heian (995-1018), translation, Geneva and Paris, Librairie Droz, 1993, 133 p. ASIN B000LV4EAA
- Fujiwara no Sukefusa, notes de l’hiver 1039, translation of the 10th and 12th months of 1039 of the Shunki, Paris, Le Promeneur, 1994, 133 p. ISBN 978-2070738151.
- La Cour du Japon à l’apogée de l’époque de Heian, aux Xe et XIe siècles, Paris, Hachette, 1995, 268 p. (translation by Wendy Cobcroft,
- Emperor and Aristocracy in Heian Japan: 10th and 11th centuries, 2013, 330 p. ISBN 978-1492262824.
- Notes journalières de Fujiwara no Sukefusa, translation of the Shunki, first vol., Hautes études orientales, 35 et 1, Geneva and Paris, Librairie Droz, 2001, 752 p. ISBN 9782600006491 ; tome deuxième, Hautes études orientales, 37, Extrême-Orient, 3, Geneva and Paris, Droz, 2004, 798 p. ISBN 978-2600008969.
- Gouverneurs de province de guerriers dans les Histoires qui sont maintenant du passé, Konjaku Monogatarishū, translations and commentaries, Bibliothèque de l’Institut des hautes études japonaises, Collège de France, Paris, 2004, 197 p. ISBN 978-2913217102.
- Recueil de décrets de trois ères méthodiquement classés, Translation and commentary of the Ruiju sandai kyaku, Bookss 8 to 20, École Pratique des Hautes Études, Sciences historiques et philologiques, Hautes Études Orientales, and Bookss 1 to 7, Hautes Études Orientales, Geneva, Droz, 2008 (811 p.) and 2011 (779 p.).
- Fujiwara no Akihira. Notes sur de nouveaux divertissements comiques, text translated and annotated, coll. "Bibliothèque chinoise", Les Belles Lettres, 2014, 370 p. ISBN 978-2251100098.

=== Direction of a collective work ===
- Histoire du Japon, coll. "Histoire des nations", Le Coteau, Horvath, 1990, 631 p. ISBN 978-2717107043.

=== Articles and contributions to collective works ===
- Un lettré à la cour de l’empereur Ichijô, Ôe no Masahira, in Mélanges offerts à M. Charles Haguenauer, Institut des hautes études japonaises, Paris, L’Asiathèque, 1980, p. 361-387.
- Le Japon ancien, échec d’une bureaucratie, in François Bloch-Lainé and Gilbert Etienne (éd.), Servir l’Etat, Paris, Éditions de l’École des hautes études en sciences sociales, 1987, p. 61-81.
- Réapparition du serment dans le Japon médiéval, in R. Verdier (éd.), Le Serment, Paris, Éditions du CNRS, 1991, p. 175-190.
- Arai Hakuseki, interprète de l'"Âge des divinités" and Comment lire les anciens textes historiques, translation of the foreword of the Koshitsū, in Cipango, cahiers d’études japonaises, Paris, Publications Langues’O, February 1993, p. 165-189.
- Une succession difficile au XIe (after the Shunki), in Mélanges offerts à M. le professeur Sieffert, special issue of Cipango, books for Japanese Studies, Paris, Publications Langues’O, 1994, p. 383-397.
- De quelques incidents entre la cour et le clergé d’Ise au XIe, in Estudos japoneses, Revista do centro de estudos japonese da Universidade de São Paulo, 1994, p. 15-41.
- Période ancienne, la dérive aristocratique d’un régime bureaucratique, in J. F. Sabouret (éd.), L’État du Japon, Paris, La Découverte, 1995, p. 84-86.
- La Cour, la Montagne et le Temple, in Le Vase de béryl. Études sur le Japon et la Chine en hommage à Bernard Frank, Arles, Picquier, 1997, p. 327-336.
- Lire et écrire dans le Japon ancien, in Paroles à dire, Paroles à écrire, under the direction of V. Alleton, Paris, Éditions de l’École des hautes études en sciences sociales, 1997, p. 253-274.
- Eugène Mermet et Kurimoto Jo.un dans la période finale du bakufu des Tokugawa, in Procès-verbaux et Mémoires, années 1996-1997, Académie des Sciences, Belles-Lettres et Arts de Besançon et de Franche-Comté, vol. 192, Besançon, 1998, p. 43-61.
- De la lecture des notes journalières, in Japon pluriel, Actes du troisième colloque de la Société française des études japonaises, Arles, Picquier, 1999, p. 15-42.
- La cour de Heian à travers le Shunki de Fujiwara no Sukefusa, in Ebisu, n° 27, Autumn-Winter 2001, p. 45-68.
- Quelques caractères des célébrations du Japon au cours du XIe, dans Cahiers Kubaba. Rites et célébrations, tome IV, vol. 2, 2002, p. 39-58.
- La Fête de Kamo, in La Fête, de la transgression à l’intégration, éd. M. Mazoyer et al., coll. "Kubaba", Paris, L’Harmatan, 2004, p. 29-45.
- Au sujet de l'apprentissage de la lecture de documents historiques, in Actes du deuxième colloque d’études japonaises de l’Université Marc Bloch, Centre européen d’études japonaises d’Alsace, Strasbourg, 2004, p. 7-23.
- La législation pénale à l'époque de Heian, autour de la somme juridique, Hossô shiyôshô, in Revue d’Études japonaises du CEEJA Benkyôkai, Publications orientalistes de France, Centre européen d'études japonaises d'Alsace, Département d'études japonaises de l’Université Marc Bloch de Strasbourg, 2005, p. 45-78.
- De la place et du rôle des gouverneurs de provinces à l'apogée de l'époque de Heian, in Cipango Cahiers d’études japonaises. Autour du Genji monogatari, special issue, 2008, p. 291-354.
- Dans la législation japonaise des VIIIe et IXe siècles, in Ebisu, Maison Franco-japonaise de Tokyo, n° 18, Autumn-Winter 2007, p. 105-130.
- Quelques remarques au sujet du Recueil de décrets de trois ères méthodiquement classés , in Études japonaises, textes et contextes. Commémoration of the 50^{e} anniversary of the establishment of the Institut des hautes études japonaises, Collège de France, Paris 1011, p. 119-135.
