= Denys Lombard =

Denys Lombard (1938 – January 8, 1998) was a French historian. He was an expert of Asia with contributions to Southeast Asian studies, Sinology, and the history of maritime Asia. He was famous for efforts to compare insular Southeast Asia and the Asian Seas to the Mediterranean area.

== Early life and education ==
Lombard was born in Marseille, France. His father was Maurice Lombard, Director of Studies at the École Pratique des Hautes Études (EPHE) in Paris and colleague of Fernand Braudel.

Lombard possessed at least six academic degrees, including a graduate degree in history and four degrees in languages (Chinese, Malay-Indonesian, Cambodian and Thai). He spoke over a dozen languages.

== Career ==
Lombard was the head of the Division des Aires Culturelles in the École des Hautes Études en Sciences Sociales (EHESS) and the director of the École Français d'Extrême-Orient (EFEO) from 1993 to 1998.

His major work on Indonesia was the three volume work Le carrefour javanais.

== Personal life ==
Lombard was married to another scholar of Asia, Claudine Salmon.

He died in 1998 in Paris. A Festschrift in honour was produced a year later.

== Publications ==
- Lombard, Denys; Arifin, Winarsih, (joint comp.); Wibisono, Minnie, (joint comp.) (1968), Histoires courtes d'Indonésie : soixante-huit "tjerpén" (1933-1965), École française d'Extrême-Orient
- Lombard, Denys (1976), Introduction à l'Indonésien, S.E.C.M.I, Third Edition: - Lombard, Denys (1991), Introduction à l'Indonésien (3. e. rév ed.), Archipel
- Aubin, Jean; Lombard, Denys (2000), Asian merchants and businessmen in the Indian Ocean and the China Sea, Oxford University Press, ISBN 978-0-19-564109-7
- Lombard, Denys (1996), Nusa Jawa : silang budaya : kajian sejarah terpadu, Gramedia Pustaka Utama, ISBN 978-979-605-454-1
- Le carrefour javanais. Essai d'histoire globale [The Javanese Crossroads: Towards a Global History]. By Denys Lombard. Three volumes. Paris: Éditions de l'École des Hautes Études en Sciences Sociales, 1990.
- Lombard, Denys; Arifin, Winarsih (2006), Kerajaan Aceh zaman Sultan Iskandar Muda (1607-1636), Kepustakaan Populer Gramedia : Forum Jakartas-Paris : Ecole francaise d'Extreme-Orient, ISBN 978-979-9100-49-8
