= French School of the Far East =

College for study of Asian societies

Coordinates: 48°51′52″N 2°17′32″E

École française d'Extrême-Orient
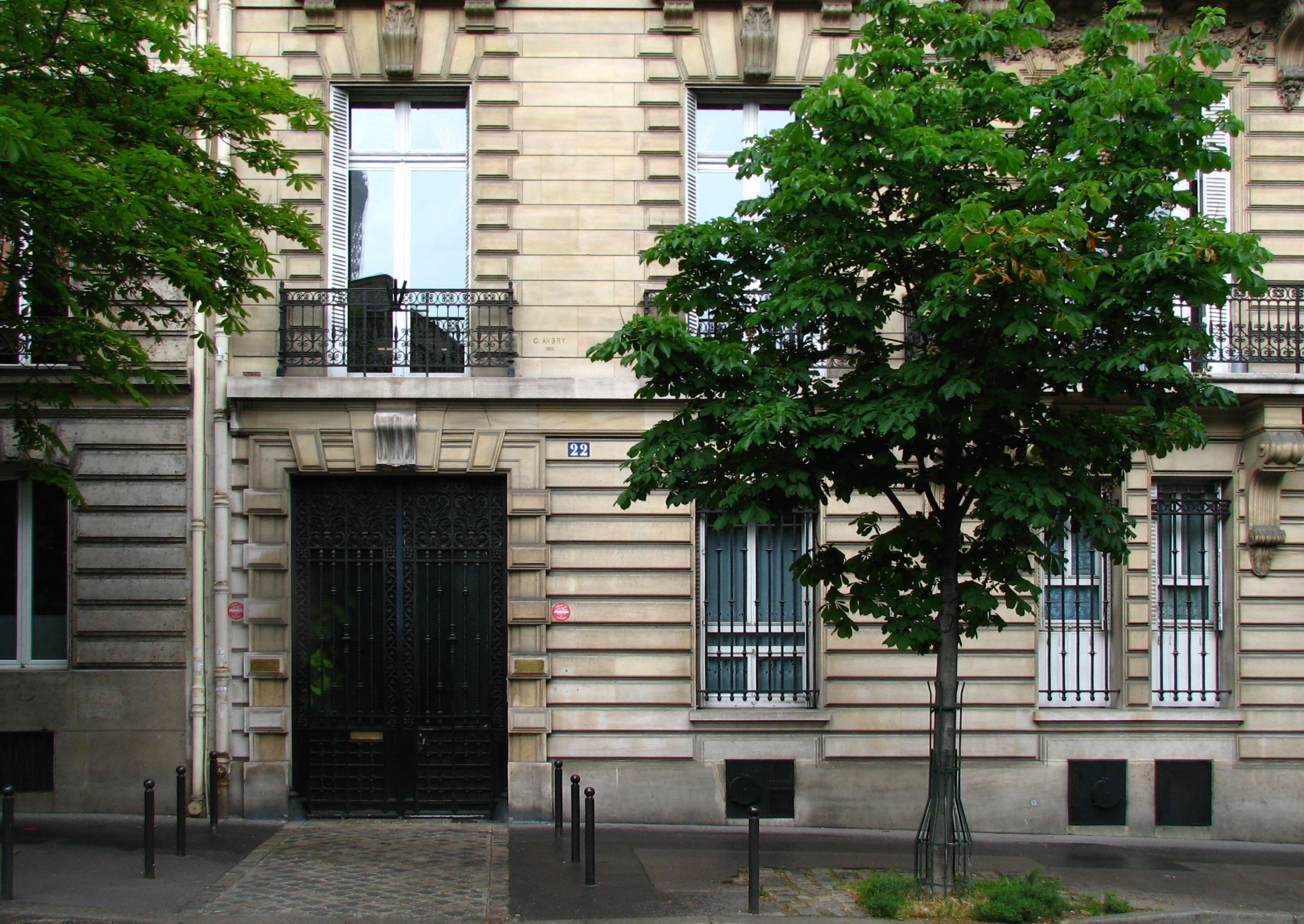
- Office of École française d'Extrême-Orient (EFEO) in Paris, France
- Parent institution: Ministry of National Education, Higher Education and Research
- Established: 20 January 1900; 126 years ago
- Director: Nicolas Fiévé
- Location: 22 Avenue du Président Wilson, 75116, Paris, France
- Interactive map of École française d'Extrême-Orient
- Website: efeo.fr

The French School of the Far East (French: École française d'Extrême-Orient, pronounced [ekɔl fʁɑ̃sɛːz dɛkstʁɛm ɔʁjɑ̃]; also translated as The French School of Asian Studies), abbreviated EFEO, is an associated college of PSL University dedicated to the study of Asian societies. It was founded on 20 January 1900 with headquarters in Hanoi in what was then the Tonkin protectorate of French Indochina. After the independence of Vietnam, its headquarters were transferred to Phnom Penh in 1957, and subsequently to Paris in 1975. Its main fields of research are archaeology, philology and the study of modern Asian societies. Since 1907, the EFEO has been in charge of conservation work at the archeological site of Angkor.

Original headquarters in Hanoi, now National Museum of Vietnamese History

Paul Mus was a member of EFEO since 1927, and "returned to Hanoi in 1927 as a secretary and librarian with the Research Institute of the French School of the Far East until 1940."

== EFEO romanization system ==
A romanization system for Mandarin was developed by the EFEO. It shares a few similarities with Wade-Giles and Hanyu Pinyin. In modern times, it has been superseded by Hanyu Pinyin.

The differences between the three romanization systems are shown in the following table:

IPA	EFEO	WG	Pinyin
p	p	p	b
pʰ	p'	p'	p
t	t	t	d
tʰ	t'	t'	t
k	k	k	g
kʰ	k'	k'	k
ts	ts	ts	z
tsʰ	ts'	ts'	c
tʂ	tch	ch	zh
tʂʰ	tch'	ch'	ch
tɕ	k/ts	ch	j
tɕʰ	k'/ts'	ch'	q
ɕ	s/h	hs	x
w	ou/w	w	w
j	i/y	y	y
ɤ	ö/é	o/ê	e
ɚ	eul	êrh	er
ɹ̩	eu	û	i
ɻ̩	e	ih	i
y	u	ü	ü/u
u	ou	u	u
ən	en	ên	en
əŋ	eng	êng	eng
ie	ie	ieh	ie
ioʊ	ieou/iou	iu	iu
iɛn	ien	ien	ian
uo	ouo	o/uo	o/uo
uaɪ	ouai	uai	uai
ueɪ	ouei	ui	ui
uan	ouan	uan	uan
uən	ouen	un	un
ye	iue	üeh	üe/ue
io	io		üe/ue
yɛn	iuen	üan	üan/uan
yn	iun	ün	ün/un
iʊŋ	ioung	iung	iong

== Directors ==
- 1900: Louis Finot
- 1905: Alfred Foucher
- 1908: Claude-Eugène Maitre
- 1920: Louis Finot
- 1926: Léonard Aurousseau
- 1929: George Cœdès
- 1947: Paul Lévy
- 1950: Louis Malleret
- 1956: Jean Filliozat
- 1977: François Gros
- 1989: Léon Vandermeersch
- 1993: Denys Lombard
- 1998: Jean-Pierre Drège
- 2004: Franciscus Verellen
- 2014: Yves Goudineau
- 2018: Christophe Marquet
- 2022: Nicolas Fiévé

== Publications ==
The catalog of EFEO Publications, some 600 titles, includes works on a wide range of disciplines in the humanities and social sciences (archaeology, history, anthropology, literature, philology, etc.), centered on Asia, from India to Japan. These publications are directed at specialists and a wider public interested in Asian civilizations and societies.

The EFEO in publishes five scholarly journals on an annual or twice-yearly basis:

- Bulletin de l'École française d'Extrême-Orient – BEFEO (Bulletin of the French School of Asian Studies), published since 1901
- Arts Asiatiques (Asian Arts), published jointly with the Musée Guimet and the CNRS
- Cahiers d'Extrême-Asie (East Asian Journal), published in Kyoto
- Aséanie (Southeast Asian Studies), published in Bangkok
- Sinologie française [S: 法国汉学, T: 法國漢學, P: Fǎguó Hànxué] (French Sinology), published in Chinese in Beijing

== See also ==
- EFEO Chinese transcription
