= King of Champa =

Historical Asian ruler

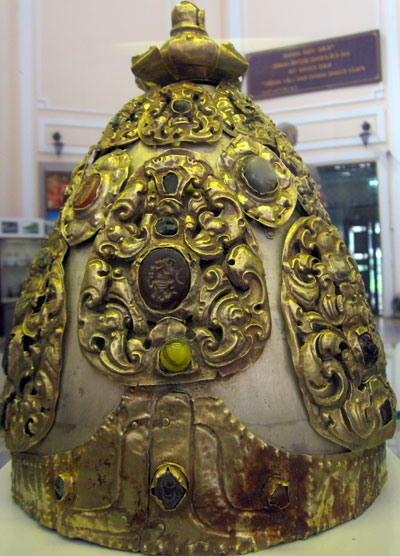
- crown of king Po Klong M'hnai

Details
- First monarch: Sri Mara
- Last monarch: Po Phaok The
- Formed: 192
- Abolished: 1832

King of Champa is the title ruler of Champa. Champa rulers often use two Hinduist style titles: raja-di-raja (राजाधिराज "king of kings"; written here in Devanagari since the Cham used their own Cham script) or po-tana-raya ("lord of all territories").

During the reign of Vikrantavarman I, also known as Prakāśādharma, the title of the king of Champa changed from "great king" (maharaja) to "king of kings" (raja-di-raja).

The regnal name of the Champa rulers originated from the Hindu tradition, often consisting of titles and aliases. Titles (prefix) like: Jaya (जय "victory"), Maha (महा "great"), Sri (श्री "glory"). Aliases (stem) like: Bhadravarman, Vikrantavarman, Rudravarman, Simhavarman, Indravarman, Paramesvaravarman, Harivarman... Among them, the suffix -varman belongs to the warrior class and is only for those leaders of the Champa Alliance.

The last king of Champa was deposed by Minh Mạng in 1832.

== List of kings of Champa ==
=== Lâm Ấp (Liu) (192 - 757) ===
Dynasty	Sanskrit	Vietnamese	Reign
1st Dynasty - Kandapurpura	Sri Mara	Khu Liên	192 - 220
1st Dynasty - Kandapurpura	?	Phạm Hùng	220 - 230
1st Dynasty - Kandapurpura	?	Phạm Duật	? – 336
2nd Dynasty - Kandapurpura	?	Phạm Văn	336–349
2nd Dynasty - Kandapurpura	?	Phạm Phật	349–377
2nd Dynasty - Kandapurpura	Bhadravarman I	Phạm Hồ Đạt	380-413
Gangaraja Dynasty - Kandapurpura	Gangaraja	Phạm Địch Chớn	?-?
Gangaraja Dynasty - Kandapurpura	Manorathavarman	Phạm Văn Địch	?-420
3rd Dynasty - Kandapurpura	?	Phạm Dương Mại I	421-431
3rd Dynasty - Kandapurpura	?	Phạm Dương Mại II	431-446
3rd Dynasty - Kandapurpura	?	Phạm Thần Thành	455-472
3rd Dynasty - Kandapurpura	?	Phạm Đang Căng Thuần	472-492
3rd Dynasty - Kandapurpura	?	Phạm Chư Nông	492-498
3rd Dynasty - Kandapurpura	?	Phạm Văn Tán	498-510
3rd Dynasty - Kandapurpura	Devavarman	Phạm Thiên Khởi	510-526
3rd Dynasty - Kandapurpura	Vijayavarman	Phạm Bật Tôi Bật Ma	526-529
Gangaraja Dynasty -Kandapurpura	Rudravarman I	Luật Đà La Bạt Ma	529-572
Gangaraja Dynasty - Simhapura	Sambhuvarman	Phạm Phạn Chí	572–629
Gangaraja Dynasty - Simhapura	Kandarpadharmavarman	Phạm Đầu Lê	629–645
Gangaraja Dynasty - Simhapura	Prabhasadharma	Phạm Trấn Long	645–?
Gangaraja Dynasty - Simhapura	Bhadresvaravarman	Bạt Đà La Thú La Bạt Ma	?–?
Gangaraja Dynasty - Simhapura	Daughter of Kandarpadharma		?–653
Gangaraja Dynasty - Simhapura	Vikrantavarman I	Chư Cát Địa	653–686
Gangaraja Dynasty - Simhapura	Naravahanavarman		686–?
Gangaraja Dynasty - Simhapura	Vikrantavarman II	Kiến Đa Thế Ma	687–731
Unknown	Rudravarman II	Lô Đà La	731-758

=== Hoàn Vương (Panduranga) (757 - 859) ===
Dynasty	Sanskrit	Vietnamese	Reign
Vicitrasagara Dynasty - Kauthara	Prithindravarman	Tất Để Bân Đà La Bạt Ma	757–770
Vicitrasagara Dynasty - Kauthara	Satyavarman	Tát Đa Bạt Ma	770–787
Vicitrasagara Dynasty - Kauthara	Indravarman I	Nhân Đà La Bạt Ma	787–801
Vicitrasagara Dynasty - Kauthara	Harivarman I	Ha Lê Bạt Ma	802–817
Vicitrasagara Dynasty - Kauthara	Vikrantavarman III	Bì Kiến Đà Bạt Ma	817–854
Bhrgu Dynasty - Indrapura	Rudravarman	?	~800-830
Bhrgu Dynasty - Indrapura	Bhadravarman II	?	~830-854

=== Chiêm Thành (Campanagara, Zhancheng) (859 - 1471) ===
Dynasty	Sanskrit	Vietnamese	Reign
Bhrgu Dynasty - Indrapura	Indravarman II	Nhân Đà La bạt Ma	854-898
Bhrgu Dynasty - Indrapura	Jaya Simhavarman I	Tăng Gia Bạt Ma	898-903
Bhrgu Dynasty - Indrapura	Saktivarman		904-905
Bhrgu Dynasty - Indrapura	Bhadravarman III	Ha La Bạt Ma	905–917
Bhrgu Dynasty - Indrapura	Indravarman III	Nhân Đà La Bạt Ma	918–960
Bhrgu Dynasty - Indrapura	Jaya Indravarman I	Nhân Di Bàn, Thích Lợi Nhân Đà Bàn (釋利因拖盤)	959–965
Bhrgu Dynasty - Indrapura	Paramesvaravarman I	Phê Mị Thuế	965–982
Bhrgu Dynasty - Indrapura	Indravarman IV	Nhân Đà La Bạt Ma	982-986
Vietnamese	none	Lưu Kế Tông	986–988
7th Dynasty - Indrapura	Harivarman II	Băng Vương La	989–997
7th Dynasty - Indrapura	Yang Pu Ku Vijaya Sri	Bì Xà Đa Bạt Ma	997-1007
? - Kauthara	Harivarman III	Ha Lê Bạt Ma	1007–1018
? - unknown	Yang Pu Ku Sri	Thi Nặc Bài Ma Diệp	1018–1030
? - unknown	Vikrantavarman IV	Bì Kiến Đà Bạt Ma	1030–1041
? - unknown	Jaya Simhavarman II	Sạ Đẩu	1041–1044
? - unknown	Sultan Mahmud	unknown	ca. 1035 (not confirmed)
Uroja Dynasty - Kauthara & Panduranga	Jaya Paramesvaravarman I	Ứng Ni	1044–1060
Uroja Dynasty - Kauthara & Panduranga	Bhadravarman IV	?	1060–1061
Uroja Dynasty - Kauthara & Panduranga	Rudravarman III	Chế Củ	1061–1074
Pralayeshvara Dynasty - Indrapura & Vijaya simultaneously	Harivarman IV	?	1074–1080
Pralayeshvara Dynasty - Indrapura & Vijaya simultaneously	Jaya Indravarman II	Chế Ma Na	1080–1081
Pralayeshvara Dynasty - Indrapura & Vijaya simultaneously	Paramabhodhisatva	Bàng Quan Giả	1081–1086
Pralayeshvara Dynasty - Indrapura & Vijaya simultaneously	Jaya Indravarman II (restored)	Chế Ma Na	1086–1113
Pralayeshvara Dynasty - Indrapura & Vijaya simultaneously	Harivarman V	Dương Bốc Ma Điệp	1114–1129
Pralayeshvara Dynasty - Indrapura & Vijaya simultaneously	Jaya Indravarman III	?	1139–1145
11th Dynasty - Vijaya	Rudravarman IV	?	1145–1147
11th Dynasty - Vijaya	Jaya Harivarman I	Chế Bì La Bút	1147–1166
11th Dynasty - Vijaya	Jaya Harivarman II	?	1166–1167
11th Dynasty - Vijaya	Jaya Indravarman IV	Trâu Á Na	1167–1190
11th Dynasty - Vijaya	Suryavarman (Khmer king in Vijaya)	?	1190–1191
11th Dynasty - Vijaya	Jaya Indravarman V (Champa king in Vijaya)	?	1191–1192
11th Dynasty - Vijaya	Suryavarman (Khmer king in Vijaya 1190-1192, then in Panduranga 119201203)		1192–1203
11th Dynasty - Vijaya	occupied by Khmer Empire		1203–1220
11th Dynasty - Vijaya	Jaya Paramesvaravarman II	?	1220–1254
11th Dynasty - Vijaya	Jaya Indravarman VI	?	1252–1257
11th Dynasty - Vijaya	Indravarman V	?	1257–1285
11th Dynasty - Vijaya	Jaya Simhavarman III	Chế Mân	1285–1307
11th Dynasty - Vijaya	Jaya Simhavarman IV	Chế Chí	1307–1312
11th Dynasty - Vijaya	Jaya Simhavarman V	Chế Năng	1312–1318
12th Dynasty - Vijaya	Jaya Ananda	Chế A Nan	1318–1342
12th Dynasty - Vijaya	Maha Sawa	Trà Hòa Bố Để	1342–1360
12th Dynasty - Vijaya	Po Binasuor	Chế Bồng Nga	1360–1390
Vr̥ṣu Dynasty - Vijaya	Jaya Simhavarman VI	La Ngai	1390–1400
Vr̥ṣu Dynasty - Vijaya	Indravarman VI	Ba Đích Lại	1400–1441
Vr̥ṣu Dynasty - Vijaya	Virabhadravarman		1441–?
14th Dynasty - Vijaya	Maha Vijaya	Ma-kha Bí-cai	1441–1446
14th Dynasty - Vijaya	Maha Kali	Ma-kha Quý-lai	1446–1449
14th Dynasty - Vijaya	Maha Kaya	Ma-kha Quý-do	1449–1458
14th Dynasty - Vijaya	Maha Saya	Ma-kha Trà-duyệt	1458–1460
14th Dynasty - Vijaya	Maha Sajan	Ma-kha Trà-toàn	1460–1471
14th Dynasty - Vijaya	Maha Sajai	Ma-kha Trà-toại	1471–1474

=== Panduranga (Phan Lung / Phan Lang) (1471 - 1697) ===
Dynasty	Eastern Cham	Vietnamese	Reign
1st Dynasty - Bal Sri Banây	Po Uwaluah	Ô Ngõa Lư A Chi Hậu	? - ?
1st Dynasty - Bal Sri Banây	Po Binnasur	Bì Nạp Tư	? - ?
1st Dynasty - Bal Sri Banây	Po Putik	Phổ Phổ Đế Khắc	? - ?
1st Dynasty - Bal Sri Banây	Po Sulika	Bà Gia-nễ-các-đáp	? - 1167
1st Dynasty - Bal Sri Banây	Po Klong Garai	Bà Khắc-lượng Gia-lai	1167 - 1205
2nd Dynasty - Băl Hangâu	Sri Agarang	Kế Khả	1205 - 1247
2nd Dynasty - Băl Hangâu	Cei Anâk	Kế Lực	1247 - 1281
3rd Dynasty - Băl Anguai	Po Debatasuar	Bà Điệp	1281 - 1306
3rd Dynasty - Băl Anguai	Po Patarsuar	Bà Bức	1306 - 1328
3rd Dynasty - Băl Anguai	Po Binnasuar	Bà Bính	1328 - 1373
4th Dynasty - Băl Anguai	Po Parican	Bà Phát	1373 - 1397
5th Dynasty - Băl Cau	Po Kasit	Bà Khiết	1433 - 1460
5th Dynasty - Băl Cau	Po Kabrah	Bà Kế	1460 - 1494
5th Dynasty - Băl Cau	Po Kabih	Bà Cấp	1494 - 1530
5th Dynasty - Băl Cau	Po Karutdrak	Bà Khứ	1530 - 1536
6th Dynasty - Băl Cau	Po Maha Sarak	Ma-kha Trà-lộc	1536 - 1541
6th Dynasty - Băl Cau	Po Kunarai	Bà Bãi	1541 - 1553
6th Dynasty - Băl Cau	Po At	Bà Ất	1553 - 1579
7th Dynasty - Băl Canar	Po Klaong Halau	Bà Khắc-lượng Khất-lưu	1579 - 1603
7th Dynasty - Băl Canar	Po Nit	Bà Nhiếp	1603 - 1613
7th Dynasty - Băl Canar	Po Jai Paran	Bà Thái	1613 - 1618
7th Dynasty - Băl Canar	Po Aih Khang	Bà Ưng	1618 - 1622
8th Dynasty - Băl Canar	Po Klaong Mah Nai	Bà Khắc-lượng Như-lai	1622 - 1627
8th Dynasty - Băl Canar	Po Rome	Bà Lâm	1627 - 1651
8th Dynasty - Băl Canar	Po Nraop	Bà Thấm	1651 - 1653
8th Dynasty - Băl Canar	Po Saktiraydapaghoh	Bà Thích	1654 – 1657
8th Dynasty - Băl Canar	Po Jatamah	Bà Chất	1657 – 1659
8th Dynasty - Băl Canar	Po Saot	Bà Tranh	1659 - 1692

=== Principality of Thuận Thành (1697 - 1832) ===
Dynasty	Eastern Cham	Vietnamese	Reign
8th Dynasty - Băl Canar	Po Saktiraydapatih	Bà Tử	1695 - 1727
8th Dynasty - Băl Canar	Po Ganuhpatih	Bà Thị	1727 - 1730
8th Dynasty - Băl Canar	Po Thuntiraidaputih	Nguyễn Văn Thuận	1730 - 1732
8th Dynasty - Băl Canar	Po Rattiraydaputao	Nguyễn Văn Đạt	1732 - 1763
8th Dynasty - Băl Canar	Po Tisundimahrai	Nguyễn Văn Thiết	1763 - 1765
8th Dynasty - Băl Canar	Po Tisuntiraydapaghoh	Nguyễn Văn Tịch	1768 - 1780
8th Dynasty - Băl Canar	Po Tisuntiraydapuran	Nguyễn Văn Tá	1780 - 1781
8th Dynasty - Băl Canar	Cei Brei	Nguyễn Văn Chiêu	1783 - 1786
8th Dynasty - Băl Canar	Po Tisuntiraydapuran (restored)	Nguyễn Văn Tá	1786 - 1793
8th Dynasty - Băl Canar	Po Thong Khang	Nguyễn Văn Tòng	1796
9th Dynasty - Băl Canar	Po Ladhuanpaghuh	Nguyễn Văn Hào	1793 - 1799
9th Dynasty - Băl Canar	Po Saong Nyung Ceng	Nguyễn Văn Chấn	1799 - 1822
9th Dynasty - Băl Canar	Po Bait Lan	Nguyễn Văn Lân	1822
9th Dynasty - Băl Canar	Po Klan Thu	Nguyễn Văn Vĩnh	1822 - 1828
9th Dynasty - Băl Canar	Po Phaok The	Nguyễn Văn Thừa	1828 - 1832
9th Dynasty - Băl Canar	Po War Palei	Bà Hóa Ba-lai	1834 - 1835

== See also ==
- History of Champa
- Legendary Champa rulers
- Maharaja
- King of Kings
