= Po Tisuntiraydapaghoh =

- King of Champa; King of Panduranga

King of Champa
- Reign: 1768–1780
- Predecessor: Po Tisundimahrai
- Successor: Po Tisuntiraidapuran
- Born: ? Champa
- Died: 1780

Po Tisuntiraydapaghoh (died 1780) was a King of the Panduranga Kingdom of Champa (in Vietnamese, Thuân Thành) who ruled from 1768 to 1780. His name is also spelt Po Tithun da Paghuh. He reigned during the early phases of the Tây Sơn wars that embroiled Annam in extensive warfare from 1771 to 1802, and succumbed as consequence of the conflict.

== Biography ==
Po Tisuntiraydapaghoh was a son of an earlier king, Po Thuntiraidaputih (d. 1732), and belonged to the elder of the two branches of the Po Rome Dynasty. When the ruler of the junior branch died in 1765, Po Tisuntiraydapaghoh was nominated as successor by the Vietnamese Nguyễn lord, but only started his reign in 1768. He resided in Bal Pangdurang (Tinh My village, Phan Ri).

Three years after his accession, the Tay Son rebellion broke out, centered on the originally Cham town An Khê. The rebellion canalized popular grievances with the oppressive court of the Nguyễn lords, and attracted highlanders and Chams, apart from Chinese pirates and discontented Vietnamese. The Tây Sơn traversed and occupied Champa in 1776. The eldest of the three Tây Sơn brothers, Nguyễn Nhạc, played on the prestige of old Champa and even appropriated the royal Cham regalia. A Cham princess called Thị Hỏa joined the ranks of the Tây Sơn and was one of several competing forces in southern Vietnam in the 1770s. She was however killed after some time, probably by 1776. The Nguyễn again occupied the region in 1779.

As for Po Tisuntiraydapaghoh himself, he is said to have followed the Vietnamese (either Tây Sơn or Nguyễn) forces on campaigns in Cochinchina and Cambodia. On his return, however, an incident sealed his fate. His entourage passed near some Vietnamese envoys, sent by Nguyễn Nhạc to bring presents to his brother Nguyễn Huệ, who waged war in Cochinchina at the time. A Cham lord, the future Po Tisuntiraidapuran, treacherously assaulted and murdered the envoys and their party and stole the presents. Hearing about the incident, the furious Nguyễn Nhạc apprehended the Cham ruler and brought him to the capital where he was done to death, in spite of his protestations of innocence. He was succeeded by Po Tisuntiraidapuran. He left a son, Po Krei Brei, who became ruler three years later.

Preceded by Po Tisundimahrai 1763–1765	Champa rulers 1768–1780	Succeeded by Po Tisuntiraidapuran 1780–1781
