= Po Rattiraydaputao =

- King of Champa; King of Panduranga

King of Champa
- Reign: 1735–1763
- Predecessor: Po Thuntiraidaputih
- Successor: Po Tisundimahrai
- Born: Champa
- Died: 1763; Bal Pangdurang (Phan Rí)
- Issue: Po Tisundimahrai

Po Rattiraydaputao (died 1763), also known as Po Rattirai da putih or Rat da patau, was a King of the Panduranga Kingdom of Champa (in Vietnamese, Thuân Thành) who ruled from 1735 to 1763. He reigned under the increasing pressure of Annamese domination and migration into Cham lands, but his time was peaceful apart from an incident in 1746.

== Biography ==
Po Rattiraidaputao was a grandson of a former ruler, Po Saktiraydapatih. The Po Rome Dynasty split in two branches in the early 18th century, and Po Rattiraydaputao was nominated as ruler by the Nguyễn lord after the demise of Po Thuntiraidaputih who belonged to the elder branch. However, his reign only started in 1735. Unlike the previous short-lived rulers, he had a long reign of 28 years. The relations with the Nguyễn court were downgraded after 1728, since all transactions with the Vietnamese authorities were done via the Vietnamese prefectures of Binh Khang and Binh Thuân. There were rarely direct contacts with the Nguyễn court in Phu Xuan (Huế). The French visitor Pierre Poivre wrote about the regular tributes that the Cham ruler, as well as the King of Cambodia and various uphill groups, were forced to dispatch to Phu Xuan every year. He also noted the arrogance with which the ruler Võ Vương treated the tribute envoys from Champa. A short-lived anti-Vietnamese rebellion was launched by two Cham leaders called Duong Bao Lai and Diêp Mã Lang in 1746. They led followers in an attack on Trấn Biên, but they were swiftly defeated by the local garrison force. Po Rattiraydaputao was probably not involved since he continued reigning.

For Europeans, Champa was, in spite of its reduced size and close dependency on the Vietnamese, still counted as a polity of its own. On the map of eastern Asia by Covens & Mortier (1760), "Ciampa" is indicated as a polity between Cambodia and Cochinchina (the Nguyễn domain). The map mainly has nautical information like capes and bays, indicating that European merchants seldom visited the port towns.

Po Rattiraydaputao died in 1763 and was succeeded as ruler by his son Po Tisundimahrai, the only father-to-son succession in Champa since the early 17th century.

Preceded by Po Thuntiraidaputih 1731–1732	Champa rulers 1735–1763	Succeeded by Po Tisundimahrai 1763–1765
