= Katip Sumat uprising =

Revolt in Vietnam (1833–1844)

Date	1833 – early 1834
Location	around Phan Rang and Central Highlands
Result	Failure of the rebellion; Uprising suppressed, the region ravaged; Disappearance of Katip Sumat; Beginning of Ja Thak Wa uprising

Belligerents
Mujahideen; Cham Muslims; Churu Muslims; Jarai Muslims; Khmer Muslims	Nguyễn dynasty Principality of Thuận Thành

Commanders and leaders
Katip Sumat; Tuan Lik; Kuac Riwa; Ja Thak Wa	Minh Mang; Lê Trung Nguyên (governor)

Strength
Unknown	1,000 imperial troops, several thousand Vietnamese (Kinh) militia and paramilitia

Katip Sumat uprising (Vietnamese: Phong trào Hồi Giáo của Katip Sumat) was a revolt in 19th century Southern Vietnam. It was led by Cham Muslim leader Katip Sumat. This is the only ever-recorded jihad war involving Vietnam.

== Background ==
The remnant of the Champa Kingdom in a small enclave in Southeast part of Mainland Southeast Asia, Panduranga, known to the Vietnamese as Principality of Thuận Thành, had been annexed by the Vietnamese from the Nguyen lord's domain in 1692, who vassalized it instead of incorporating. During the Tây Sơn rebellion (1771–1789) as the Nguyen were overthrown, Panduranga king Po Tisuntiraidapuran switched alliance to the Tây Sơn rebels. By 1793, Panduranga effectively became a vassal client state of the Nguyen, who later conquered all of Vietnam in 1802. The first Nguyen emperor, Gia Long, tried to keep Panduranga as a vassal state. His successor, Minh Mạng, an absolutist, wanted to annex and assimilate the last Cham entity. However, he met challenges from the Viceroyalties of Saigon and Hanoi, and increasing Cham resistance.

Islam began proliferating in Champa from the 11th century, growing more popular after the 1471 Vietnamese conquest of Champa. It replaced or blended with traditional Hindu-Chamic customs. The majority of Cham Muslims in Central Vietnam, including the royal family, were followers of Bani or localized Cham Shiites and still keep practicing Hindu-Chamic traditions, while on the other hand, the Cham Muslims in the Mekong Delta and Cambodia were majority Sunni. The dynamic omnipresence of the Cham people and their diaspora communities scattered throughout Southeast Asia remains a great challenge posing to every ruler of Vietnam as well as Cambodia.

In August 1832, after the death of his foremost enemy, Viceroy of Saigon–Le Van Duyet, Minh Mang of Vietnam triumphantly annexed Panduranga and held the last Cham king Po Phaok The as royal hostage in Hue court. Minh Mang forced the Chams to integrate, as well as purging dissents and supporters of Le Van Duyet. A Khâm Mạng (generalized as "temporary assigned") official was sent to Panduranga as the new magistrate and to punish the Chams who were suspected to be supporters of Duyet.

Several Cham officials were jailed, sent to exile, or executed, and their properties were confiscated. Shortly after the purge, the Khâm Mạng office ordered the Cham to abandon their culture and practice Vietnamese customs. They forbade the Cham Bani and Sunnis to exercise Ramadhan month and Cham Hindus to worship their ancestors, completely removing the traditional Cham social hierarchy. The Vietnamese office further ordered total rapid assimilation of the Chams, integrating Panduranga into Vietnamese administration, heavy taxes, social structures, land, military services were implemented, and issued severe punishments for those who dare to oppose. Still, these policies were just to increase Cham dissatisfaction and resistance to Vietnamese subjugation.

Katip Sumat, a Cambodian Cham khaṭīb who had studied Islam in Kelantan, Malay Peninsula, was outraged upon hearing the news that Champa had been annexed by the Hue court in 1832 and that the Vietnamese were oppressive rules over the old Panduranga. Cham sources did not assert a specific biography for Sumat, so it is unclear whether he was actually a cleric or only a religious student. He left Kelantan and returned to Cambodia in early 1833, which at the time was in a state of anarchy and being occupied by Vietnam. Sumat assembled his followers, mostly made up of Cambodian Chams and Malays secretly crossed into Panduranga, to organize an uprising against the Hue court and reclaim Cham independence. However his plan was compromised shortly after when a Cham Hindu official named Po Kabait Thuac, fearing retaliation, reported Sumat's potential uprising to the Vietnamese court. In response, Minh Mang immediately asked all alleged Cham supporters of Katip Sumat to be arrested, but it turned out to be poor intelligence gathering of the Hue court, in which later all suspects were released and Thuac was executed by the Vietnamese court for "making false accusation."

Nevertheless, Sumat was frustrating and thought that 'some of the Cham gentlemen are betraying him', and he intended to give up the movement in reluctance. But his supporters tried to convince him to continue taking lead in the uprising. Finally, the katip agreed to renew the movement, but took a more radical Islamist path over the original national liberation goal, under an Islamic banner.

To prepare for the uprising, Katip Sumat gathered his followers on a cinder-core mount called Aih Amrak in Đồng Nai province as his sang masjid operational base, preaching the Qur'an and disseminating Islamism, gathering Muslims from various backgrounds. Then, Sumat sent his followers to the Central Highlands to teach Islam among Churu and Jarai villagers and recruit more fighters, demanding from his followers "absolute loyalty to Allah and Islam." His forces also murdered and kidnapped Cham Bani leaders who spoke against his radical propagation of Islam.

== Revolt in Southern Vietnam ==
Having refused all of Minh Mang's requests to surrender, in summer or unknown month of 1833, Katip Sumat and his forces began a general uprising in a large area in Southern Vietnam, from Ninh Thuan to Dong Nai: Tuan Lik in Phan Rí, Kuac Riwa in Long Hương (Bà Rịa), and Ja Thak Wa in Phan Rang, all raised flags with two Cham words Po Rasak (figuratively: His Great Glorious Wonderful, an implication for Allāh and/or prophet Mohammed) enlarged on them. The uprising arose in many towns, attacking Vietnamese tax register centers and military garrisons. Sumat's main goals were first to liberate Champa from Vietnamese rule, then spread Islam further in the Indochina peninsula, seek to establish an Islamic Vietnam by using "militant Islamism" (Jihadism) ideology, which at the time was relatively new in the Southeast Asia context.

Minh Mang's response was sending 1,000 well-equipped royal troops to suppress the rebellion, along with mobilizing Kinh civilians in Binh Thuan into militia units to join with government forces. Caught between the Hue court and the Islamist revolt, Cham civilians became targets of Vietnamese atrocities. Vietnamese troops unleashed havoc on the areas, burning Cham villages to the ground (particularly coastal villages to prevent civilians to flee overseas) and massacred innocent civilians in great numbers. Vietnamese Kinh militia-civilians and marauding bands, took advantage of the chaotic moment, murdering Cham civilians on their own, seizing and burning Cham farmlands.

Minh Mang at the same time was imposing an isolationist closed-door policy, blocking people from getting out, restricting foreign trade and missionaries. The outside world was completely unaware of the total destruction that occurring in former Champa. Believing that Po Ouwalah Allāh will always bless and safeguard them for victory, Katip and his forces were unprepared for the court's paranoid retaliation and terrors that unleashed, and retreated to the highlands in the west, but still ordered revolts in lowland to keep fighting against government's soldiers.

In such circumstances, Minh Mang then sought to ease his assimilation progress of the Cham, switching to condemn the rapid spreading of Islam and militant Islamism in Southern Vietnam. His agenda became "preventing Islamic extremism" instead of previously "assimilating the Chams", seeking sorts of divisions and sectarian disputes among the Cham, which provided him supports from moderate Cham Bani and Cham Hindus, thus weakening the Islamic movement's position.

Among the leadership of the Katip Sumat uprising, fragile began growing. A leader of the movement, Awal Ja Thak Wa–a moderate Cham Shi'a Bani cleric–protested against the zealot faction of Katip Sumat. Cham documents assert that disputes between Ja and Sumat were related to critics of Sumat's snatching of the national liberation movement and turned it into his own campaign to spread Islam and establish an Islamic state in Vietnam while Ja's goals were to reestablish the Cham state along with Hindu-Bani traditions. Sumat turned against and maneuvered to expel Ja out of the movement by appealing the Hue court to arrest Ja. Sumat also attacked other leaders of the movement in a power struggle. Ja soon later decided to split from Sumat and formed his resistance front focusing on Cham emancipation from Vietnamese rules, and his movement rallied all peoples regardless of religion and ethnicity to revolt against the Vietnamese court. The rebellion of Ja Thak Wa was considered more popular and dangerous to the Hue court. Lacking unity and popular support, by late 1833 or early 1834, the Katip Sumat uprising either had been dissipated by itself or crushed by government forces, and Sumat himself disappeared from the scene.

== See also ==
- Islam in Vietnam
- Tuan Phaow
- Ja Lidong rebellion
- Nduai Kabait rebellion
- Lê Văn Khôi revolt
- Ja Thak Wa uprising
- History of the Cham–Vietnamese wars

== Works cited ==
- Hubert, Jean-François (2012). The Art of Champa. Parkstone International. ISBN 978-1-78042-964-9.
- Po, Dharma (2013). Le Panduranga (Campa). Ses rapports avec le Vietnam (1802-1835). International Office of Champa.
- Bruckmayr, Philipp (2022), "The Changing Fates of Islam in Vietnam and Cambodia", in Syed, Muhammad Khairudin Aljunied (ed.), Routledge Handbook of Islam in Southeast Asia, Routledge, pp. 203–233, doi:10.4324/9780429275449-15, ISBN 978-1-000-54504-3, S2CID 245969641
- Weber, Nicolas (2012). "The destruction and assimilation of Campā (1832–35) as seen from Cam sources". Journal of Southeast Asian Studies. 43 (1): 158–180. doi:10.1017/S0022463411000701. JSTOR 41490300. S2CID 154818297.
