= Po Thuntiraidaputih =

- King of Champa; King of Thuận Thành Principality

King of Champa
- Reign: 1731–1732
- Predecessor: Po Ganuhpatih
- Successor: Po Rattiraydaputao
- Born: Unknown; Champa
- Died: 1732; Băl Canar, Panduranga, Champa (in present-day Phan Rí Cửa, Tuy Phong District, Bình Thuận Province, Vietnam)
Regnal name
- Kham Lik Mbin
- Father: Po Saut

Po Thuntiraidaputih (died 1732) was a King of Champa in Panduranga who ruled from 1731 to 1732.

== Biography ==
The father of Po Thuntiraidaputih was King Po Saut who was defeated and captured by the forces of the Nguyễn lord of Annam in 1693. By the early 18th century, the Po Rome Dynasty of Champa split up in two branches, departing from Po Saut and his junior brother Po Saktiraydapatih. After the demise of the grandson of the last-mentioned, Po Ganuhpatih, in 1730, the dignity went back to the senior branch in the form of Po Thuntiraidaputih. The circumstances are not known in detail, but he anyway received the ordination of the ruler Nguyễn Phúc Trú in the Year of the Pig (1731) with the title of Kham Lik Mbin (in Vietnamese, Kham Ly Binh). However, his time was short as he died already in the following year 1732. He was succeeded by a member of the junior branch of the dynasty, Po Rattiraydaputao.

Preceded by Po Ganuhpatih 1728-1730	Champa rulers 1731–1732	Succeeded by Po Rattiraydaputao 1735–1763
