= Po Saong Nyung Ceng =

- Ruler of Champa

Ruler of Champa
- Reign: 1799–1822
- Predecessor: Po Ladhuanpuguh
- Successor: Po Klan Thu
- Deputy ruler: Po Klan Thu

Deputy ruler of Champa
- Reign: 1794–1799
- Successor: Po Klan Thu
- Ruler: Po Ladhuanpuguh
- Born: Champa
- Died: 1822; Băl Canar, Panduranga, Champa (in present-day Phan Rí Cửa, Tuy Phong District, Bình Thuận Province, Vietnam)
- Spouse: daughter of Po Krei Brei
- Issue: Po Phaok The
Names
- Po Saong Nyung Ceng; Nguyễn Văn Chấn (阮文振)
Regnal name
- Thuận Thành trấn Khâm sai Thống binh cai cơ (順城鎮欽差統兵該奇)
- Father: ?
- Mother: Khanh Hoa

Po Saong Nyung Ceng (?–1822), also known as Po Cang or Po Saong Nhung Cheng, was the ruler of the Panduranga Kingdom in Champa (in Vietnamese, Thuận Thành) from 1799 to 1822. His Vietnamese name was Nguyễn Văn Chấn (阮文振). He emerged as an able partisan of Nguyễn Ánh during the Tây Sơn wars that ravaged Vietnam up to 1802, and his loyalty to the Nguyễn dynasty ensured stable relations between the central government and the Cham principality, although his death was followed by local revolts.

== Background and appointment as ruler ==
Not much is known about the background of Po Saong Nyung Ceng, but according to one source he was the son-in-law of a previous ruler, Po Krei Brei. He joined the Nguyễn army in the fight against the Tây Sơn movement and was given the title Khâm sai thông binh cai co by Nguyễn Ánh in 1790. In 1794, Nguyễn Ánh appointed him viceroy, or the deputy ruler of Champa.

Po Thong Khang, the Champa leader supported by the Tây Sơn dynasty, invaded Băl Canar (present-day Phan Rí Cửa, Tuy Phong District, Bình Thuận Province) in 1796. The attack was defeated by Po Saong Nyung Ceng. Po Saong Nyung Ceng also took part in putting down the rebellion of the Muslim leader Tuan Phaow in 1795-96. The Cham ruler Po Ladhuanpuguh (Nguyễn Văn Hào) fell ill in 1798 and Po Saong Nyung Ceng provisionally took over the government in the third month of the same year. When the ruler died in the tenth month of the Year of the Sheep (at the end of 1799), Nguyễn Ánh gave him investiture as ruler of Thuận Thành or Champa with the military title Chuởng Cơ. Internally, the Chams still addressed the ruler as patau (king).

== Reign ==
During Po Saong Nying Ceng's tenure, in 1802, lord Nguyễn Ánh finally managed to defeat the Tây Sơn and unite Vietnam under a single rule, as Emperor Gia Long. Peace was therefore restored, and the ruler was able to reorganize the Cham lands and address the consequences of the long Vietnamese civil war. He was granted full powers over the non-Vietnamese inhabitants of Thuận Thành. He was also entitled to raise a small army under his sole command, and to levy taxes from the population. The arrangement might be seen more as a fief to reward faithful services than as the reconstruction of a Cham vassal polity. Nevertheless, the tribulations of the Cham people persisted. As a manuscript has it, "in this era, the people suffered a lot due to the corvée services, and did not know from whom they could hope for assistance". The population was ordered to construct military posts and magazines to which they had to transport rice. After receiving report about the forest resources of Champa, the Emperor ordered the Chams to gather wood for the construction of ships. To make matters worse, a crauh (stomach disease) epidemic ravaged the land in 1820. In spite of the heavy corvée services, "the kingdom was not threatened by disparition, for Po Cang maintained the traditional Cham customs with perseverance."

== Death and succession ==
Po Saong Nyung Ceng passed away in the sixth month of the Year of the Horse 1822. His posthumous name was Sulatan Ya Inra anap raja kulat cahya Kulav (Sultan Jaya Indra, assistant of the royal family, splendour of the Kulav flower). Although he had a son, Po Phaok The, he was not in the line of succession. Rather, Emperor Minh Mạng appointed a certain Po Bait Lan as the new ruler. This was however followed by an insurrection by Ja Lidong that lasted until 1823 and convinced the Emperor to revoke the investiture. The deceased ruler was eventually succeeded by his viceroy Po Klan Thu. In the historical literature, Po Cang (Po Saong Nyung Ceng) is often erroneously referred as the last Cham ruler, and is said to have fled to Cambodia with part of the population. In fact, this is due to confusion with a previous king, Po Krei Brei.

There exists a historical record about him, Ariya Po Ceng. The record is written in Cham script. It is kept in Société Asiatique de Paris.

Preceded by Po Ladhuanpuguh 1793–1799	Champa rulers 1799–1822	Succeeded by Po Klan Thu 1822–1828
