= Po Phaok The =

- Ruler of Champa

Ruler of Champa
- Reign: 1828–1832
- Predecessor: Po Klan Thu
- Successor: none
- Deputy ruler: Po Dhar Kaok

Deputy ruler of Champa
- Reign: 1822–1829
- Predecessor: Po Klan Thu
- Successor: Po Dhar Kaok
- Ruler: Po Klan Thu
- Born: Unknown; Băl Canar, Panduranga, Champa (in present-day Phan Rí Cửa, Tuy Phong District, Bình Thuận Province, Vietnam)
- Died: 1835; Huế, Vietnam
Names
- Po Phaok The; Nguyễn Văn Thừa (阮文承)
Regnal name
- Thuận Thành trấn Khâm sai Thống binh cai cơ (順城鎮欽差統兵該奇)
- Father: Po Saong Nyung Ceng

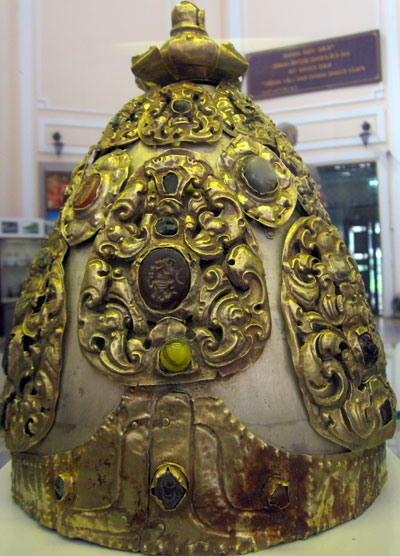
The golden crown of Po Klong M'hnai, crafted in the XVII-XVIII centuries, is currently on display at the Vietnam History Museum in Ho Chi Minh City.

Po Phaok The (?–1835), also known as Po Phaok or Cei Phaok The, was the last ruler of Champa from 1828 to 1832. His Vietnamese name was Nguyễn Văn Thừa (阮文承). He lived at a time when the Vietnamese monarch strove to centralize the country, which led to the demise of Champa (in Vietnamese, the Principality of Thuận Thành) as a vassal polity. The ruler himself was deposed and ended his life a victim of the suspicions of Emperor Minh Mạng.

== Reign ==
Po Phaok The was a son of Po Saong Nyung Ceng (Nguyễn Văn Chấn). When his father died in 1822, his succession was blocked by the Vietnamese imperial authorities. After some problems, Po Klan Thu (Nguyễn Văn Vĩnh) was made the new Cham ruler, while Po Phauk The was made deputy ruler. Po Klan Thu's times was short, however, since he died in 1828. Po Phaok The was now appointed as new ruler at the strong insistence of the Viceroy of Lower Cochinchina, Lê Văn Duyệt who maintained a largely autonomous position outside immediate imperial control. The appointment was done without Emperor Minh Mạng's direct permission, to his apparent dissatisfaction. Po Phaok The was granted the Vietnamese title Thuận Thành trấn Khâm sai Thống binh cai cơ. Po Klan Thu's son Po Dhar Kaok (Nguyễn Văn Nguyên) was appointed as his viceroy, or the deputy ruler. His name as we have it actually means "Lord Deputy (whose name is) The".

During his reign, Champa did not have a direct relationship with Huế court as was the case under his predecessor; they only sent tribute to Lê Văn Duyệt in Lower Cochinchina. These years nevertheless saw a concerted effort of Vietnamization of the Cham population. The old accord made between the Champa ruler and the Nguyễn lord in 1712 was abrogated, meaning that the Vietnamese legal system was enforced in a region where Vietnamese was not widely spoken. The social relations between Chams and Vietnamese deteriorated considerably. To this contributed the harsh cultural policy. The inhabitants were ordered to dress in Vietnamese rather than Cham style, to celebrate Vietnamese ceremonies, and abandon various customs.

== Dismantling of the Champa principality ==
Lê Văn Duyệt fell seriously ill in the early 1830s, which gave Minh Mang an opportunity to strengthen his position in the south. At the same time, a group of Cham dignitaries sent a secret missive to the Emperor where they complained about Po Phaok The, officially since he had not sent revenue to the court in Huế. In fact, the dignitaries realized that Lê Văn Duyệt would not live much longer and wished to save their own skins when Minh Mang struck back. For Minh Mang, this showed that there was no cohesion among the Cham elite, and that the Viceroy's grip on Champa was slipping. He profited from the situation by capturing Po Phaok The and Po Dhar Kaok and transfer them to Huế. In there, Po Phaok The was granted the Vietnamese noble title, Diên Ân bá (延恩伯, "Count of Diên Ân").

About one month after Po Phaok The's arrest, Lê Văn Duyệt died in July 1832. After Duyệt's death, Minh Mạng's new appointees arrived in Cochinchina and took over the local administration. At the same time, Champa was annexed by Vietnam as Minh Mang ordered to occupy the land and punish the population for their support of Lê Văn Duyệt. In the same year, Vietnamese administration was implemented, the Cham royal archive destroyed, and offices associated with the Churu, Raglai and Cham ethnicities were abolished.

== Execution ==
During the king's absence, two major rebellions broke out in the Panduranga area: the Katip Sumat uprising (1832-1834) and the Ja Thak Wa uprising (1834-1835). However, both were put down by the Vietnamese and followed by severe repression.

In the wake of the rebellions, Minh Mang accused Po Paok The of colluding with Lê Văn Khôi, the adopted son of Lê Văn Duyệt who had rebelled in the south. It is unclear if there was any substance in the charges, though he is known to have stayed in Bình Thuận province in the old Cham land in 1833-1834. At any rate the ex-ruler was searched for and arrested. Po Phaok The was sentenced to the "slow death" (lang tri) and the sentence was carried out on the sixth month of the Year of the Sheep. The ex-deputy Po Dhar Kaok was likewise executed.

There is a historical record about him: Ariya Po Phaok. The record was written in Cham script. It is kept in Société Asiatique de Paris.

Preceded by Po Klan Thu 1822–1828	Champa rulers 1828–1832	Succeeded by Annexed by Nguyễn dynasty of Vietnam
