= Po Bait Lan =

- Ruler of Champa

Ruler of Champa
- Reign: 1822
- Predecessor: Po Saong Nyung Ceng
- Successor: Po Klan Thu
- Born: 18th century Champa
- Died: after 1822; Champa
- Religion: Muslim

Po Bait Lan was a Cham noble who was briefly appointed ruler of the Panduranga Kingdom in Champa (in Vietnamese, Thuận Thành) in 1822. Due to the volatile conditions in Champa at the time, his investiture was quickly revoked by the Vietnamese Emperor Minh Mệnh.

== Biography ==
Emperor Ming Mệnh, who succeeded to the throne of Vietnam in 1820, was bent on centralizing imperial power and curb the autonomy of Lower Cochinchina where the viceroy Lê Văn Duyệt had a strong position. This entailed stricter control over the Cham principality Thuận Thành. When the old Cham ruler Po Saong Nyung Ceng lay on his deathbed in 1822, Minh Mang summoned the deputy ruler Po Klan Thu to Huế to have him under surveillance. Two months later, the Cham ruler passed away. As Po Klan Thu was barred from the succession, the Emperor appointed a certain Po Bait Lan as the new ruler on the proposition of the Governor of Bình Thuận province. The dignitaries of the Cham court were not consulted. However, the absence of Po Klan Thu, who was regarded by the Chams as the right successor, inspired a rebellion headed by Ja Lidong. Po Klan Thu, worried about the development, asked Minh Mang to reconsider his decision. Since the Emperor already had problems with revolts in other parts of Vietnam, he complied by dismissing Po Bait Lan and appoint Po Klan Thu in his stead. The Ja Lidong revolt was terminated in the following year. With these events, Po Bait Lan disappears from the historical records.

| Preceded by Po Saong Nyung Ceng 1799-1822 | Champa rulers 1822 | Succeeded by Po Klan Thu 1822–1828 |
