= Po Tisuntiraidapuran =

- Ruler of Champa

Ruler of Champa
- Reign: 1780–1781, 1786-1793
- Predecessor: Po Tisuntiraydapaghoh
- Successor: Po Thong Khang (recognized by Tây Sơn dynasty); Po Krei Brei & Po Ladhuanpuguh (recognized by Nguyễn lord)
- Born: Băl Canar, Panduranga, Champa (in present-day Phan Rí Cửa, Tuy Phong District, Bình Thuận Province, Vietnam)
- Died: 1793; Gia Định, Đàng Trong, Đại Việt (in present-day Ho Chi Minh City, Vietnam)
Names
- Po Tisuntiraidapuran; Nguyễn Văn Tá (阮文佐)
Regnal name
- Thuận Thành trấn Khâm sai Thống binh cai cơ (順城鎮欽差統兵該奇); Thuận Thành trấn vương (順城鎮王)
- Religion: Islam

Po Tisuntiraidapuran (?–1793) was a ruler of the Panduranga Kingdom of Champa (in Vietnamese, Thuân Thành) who ruled from 1780 to 1781 or 1782, and again from 1786 to 1793. His Vietnamese name was Nguyễn Văn Tá (阮文佐). He ruled in a difficult time, when the Tây Sơn wars ravaged Vietnam. He generally supported the Tây Sơn rebels against Nguyễn Ánh and was later executed by Ánh when he proved victorious.

== Ascent to the Cham kingship ==
The Cham chronicles say that Po Tisuntiraidapuran was not (closely) related to his immediate predecessors. He was however a descendant of the early 18th century king Po Saktiraydapatih. He was born in a Year of the Dog (1742, 1754, etc.) and was originally a Cham lord under king Po Tisuntiraydapaghoh, who followed Vietnamese forces in southern Vietnam (whether Tây Sơn or Nguyễn is not specified). Allegedly, he killed some envoys of the Tây Sơn ruler Nguyễn Nhạc. The blame for the murders was put on Po Tisuntiraydapaghoh who was deposed and executed by the Tây Sơn. Instead, Po Tisuntiraidapuran was appointed ruler of Champa with the title cai cơ by "the Vietnamese king" (either Nguyễn Nhạc or Nguyễn Ánh). His position was extremely tenuous, since Champa was a badly afflicted victim of the Vietnamese civil war since 1771. The fate of the small polity was entirely dependent on the outcome of the strife between the Tây Sơn dynasty and the Nguyễn lords.

== Flight and reinstatement ==
Po Tisuntiraidapuran is said by the Cham chronicles to have ruled for one year and then forced to flee in the year of the Buffalo (1781). It is not clear where he fled. Historical tradition explains that the old king left a son in Cambodia, Po Krei Brei, who managed to prove his father's innocence. Po Tisuntiraidapuram, however, found support from the mother of the Vietnamese ruler, and escaped punishment. However, the chronology of events is not clear: Vietnamese chronicles say that the Tây Sơn rebels invaded Bình Thuận in 1782 and were approached by Po Tisuntiraidapuran who submitted to them. He offered the royal seals to the Tây Sơn leaders and was later on regarded as a traitor by Nguyễn Ánh. Inconsistent with this, the Cham chronicles speak of an interregnum for two years (1781-1783). This was followed by the brief reign of Po Krei Brei (1783-1786) who was appointed by Nguyễn Nhạc but fled from Champa after three years. Now Po Tisuntiraidapuran was appointed ruler for the second time by Nguyễn Nhạc, in the Year of the Horse (1786).

== Second reign and fall ==
According to the Cham chronicles, Po Tisuntiraidapuran managed to retain power over Champa for eight years. At the beginning, his rule was popular since forced deliveries of elephant tusks, rhinoceros horn, and wood were abolished. As he mainly thought of his own dignity and spent much time on hunting, he nevertheless soon fell in popular esteem. Moreover, Vietnamese sources suggest a more complicated political situation; they say that Nguyễn Ánh fought the Tây Sơn in the region in 1790, and appointed Po Krei Brei (Nguyễn Văn Chiêu) as governor of the Cham lands with the title Khâm Sai Chuởng Cơ. At the same time another Cham notable, Po Ladhuanpuguh (Nguyễn Văn Hào) was instrumental in conquering the Phanri region for Nguyễn Ánh and was made governor of three highland districts. There were therefore a few competing Cham rulers at the time.

In 1793, Phanri was definitely secured by the army of Nguyễn Ánh. Po Tisuntiraidapuran was defeated and forced to flee with the Tây Sơn general Hô Van Thự. He took shelter in the highland districts but was captured by the forces loyal to Nguyễn Ánh and Po Ladhuanpuguh. He was executed in Đồng Nai (adjacent to Gia Định, present-day Ho Chi Minh City) "for his crimes". Since then, Champa rulers did not use the title Thuận Thành trấn phiên vương (順城鎮藩王, "Vassal king of Thuận Thành trấn"); Champa was regarded as a chiefdom under Vietnamese thổ ty system.

In the collection of historical records Archives royales du Champa, there are two documents related to him.

| Preceded by Po Tisuntiraydapaghoh | Champa rulers 1780–1781?, 1786–1793 | Succeeded by Po Thong Khang (recognized by Tây Sơn dynasty); Po Krei Brei & Po Ladhuanpuguh (recognized by Nguyễn lord) |
