= Nduai Kabait rebellion =

Date	1826
Location	Principality of Thuận Thành (Present-day Central and Southern Vietnam)
Result	Rebellion suppressed

Belligerents
Nduai Kabait rebels	Vietnamese court Principality of Thuận Thành

Commanders and leaders
Nduai Kabait (executed)	Po Klan Thu; Minh Mang

The Nduai Kabait Rebellion was an anti-Vietnamese Cham revolt led by Nduai Kabait, took place in 1826 in Central Vietnam against the court of Po Klan Thu (r. 1822–1828), the ruling Cham king who was considered being manipulated by the Vietnamese ruler Minh Mang, and increasing (Vietnamese) Kinh settler residences in Panduranga.

Nduai Kabait was a formal Cham official and military general. Starting from upland Dong Nai (Dong-Nai Thuong), he urged Chams as far away as in Khánh Hòa and Phú Yên to rise up against the Vietnamese. Minh Mang ordered local troops joining Po Klan Thu to put down the rebellion. The army of Khánh Hòa and Phú Yên attacked on Kỳ Tuân fort while Po Klan Thu was leading his army to Dong Nai Thuong. Due to rough mountainous terrains and densely forested roads, Po Klan Thu had to retreat.

In Khánh Hòa and Phú Yên, Minh Mang issued a total liquidation of the rebels. But in Panduranga, Po Klan Thu opened a conference with the leadership of the rebels. Both sides agreed to reach a peaceful reconciliation. But when Nduai Kabait's delegation arrived in Po Klan Thu's fort, one of the king's representative officials ordered troops to arrest the attaché, all of Nduai Kabait's troops and tortured them. Finally, they put two of Nduai Kabait's commanders on a pyre and burned them to death, then grind their bodies into small pieces of human meat and distributed them to those prisoners. Panicked of this brutal retribution, all the prisoners immediately laid their arms and surrendered to that official, putting an end to Nduai Kabait's rebellion.

After having the revolt suppressed, Minh Mang began to orchestrate his Vietnamization-the cultural assimilation, on the Chams.

== See also ==
- Ja Lidong rebellion
- Katip Sumat uprising
- Ja Thak Wa uprising
- Principality of Thuận Thành
- History of the Cham–Vietnamese wars
