= Po Ladhuanpuguh =

- Ruler of Champa

Ruler of Champa
- Reign: 1793–1799
- Predecessor: Po Tisuntiraidapuran
- Successor: Po Saong Nyung Ceng
- Co-ruler: Po Krei Brei (1790)
- Deputy ruler: Po Saong Nyung Ceng (1794–1799)
- Born: Champa
- Died: 1799; Băl Canar, Panduranga, Champa (in present-day Phan Rí Cửa, Tuy Phong District, Bình Thuận Province, Vietnam)
Names
- Po Ladhuanpuguh; Nguyễn Văn Hào (阮文豪)
Regnal name
- Thuận Thành trấn Thống nhung chưởng cơ (順城鎮統戎掌奇)

Po Ladhuanpuguh (died 1799) was the ruler of the Panduranga Kingdom of Champa (in Vietnamese, Thuận Thành) from 1793 to 1799. His Vietnamese name was Nguyễn Văn Hào (阮文豪). He was a partisan of Nguyễn Ánh in his struggle against the Tây Sơn movement that embroiled Vietnam in a civil war up to 1802. The reign of Po Ladhuanpuguh was brief and filled with struggles against local rebels.

== Rise to power ==
Po Ladhuanpuguh did not belong to the Cham aristocracy but rather had a commoner background. His career was set in the tumultuous Tây Sơn era that lasted from 1771 to 1802. Panduranga changed master several times during this period, between the Nguyễn and Tây Sơn factions. The Cham kings in the 1780s were appointed by the Tây Sơn ruler Nguyễn Nhạc. Among the functionaries of the Cham principality was Po Ladhuanpughuh. At one stage, he threw in his lot with the Nguyễn leader Nguyễn Ánh, becoming his trusted lieutenant. In 1790 he conquered the region of Phan Rí for Nguyễn Ánh, who in the meantime retook Gia Định (present-day Ho Chi Minh City). However, Phanrang remained with the Tây Sơn for the time being.

Now Po Ladhuanpuguh and the Cham ex-ruler Po Krei Brei (Nguyễn Văn Chiêu) were appointed co-rulers of Thuận Thành or Champa by Nguyễn Ánh; they were granted the title cai cơ and chưởng cơ respectively. Po Ladhuanpuguh was the military governor, while Po Krei Brei served as the civilian governor. Since then, Champa was regarded as a province by Vietnam, instead of a country. After a short time, Po Krei Brei was relieved of his dignity since he had committed a not specified transgression. He later fled in exile to Cambodia.

== Reign ==
That left Ladhuanpuguh as the Nguyễn candidate for the Cham lordship. The Nguyễn army definitely took hold of Băl Canar (Phan Rí) in 1793. The troops of Po Ladhuanpuguh and Nguyễn Ánh captured the Tây Sơn vassal Po Tisuntiraidapuran and had him executed. From now on, the Nguyễn faction occupied southernmost Vietnam from Gia Định to Khánh Hòa, so that the Cham lands somewhat stabilized. Po Ladhuanpuguh was formally promoted to chưởng cơ of Thuận Thành in the first month of the Year of the Tiger (1794) and thus became the sole ruler of Champa. As his phó chánh trân (viceroy), Po Saong Nyung Ceng was appointed.

With the Tây Sơn wars still raging, the reign of Ladhuanpuguh was turbulent and marked by a few local rebellions. Po Thong Khang, the Cham leader advocated by the Tây Sơn dynasty, invaded Băl Canar in 1796. The attack was however defeated with the help of Po Saong Nyung Ceng. A Malay nobleman called Tuan Phaow revolted against the Nguyễn lords in 1796 and gave his movement an Islamic profile. Again, Po Ladhuanpuguh and Po Saong Nyung Ceng acted decisively to fight rebellion. The following year, Tuan Phaow was defeated and fled to Kelantan on the Malay Peninsula.

Po Ladhuanpuguh fell ill in 1798 and his viceroy Po Saong Nyung Ceng took over governing responsibility. He eventually died in the tenth month of the Year of the Sheep (end of 1799).

Preceded by Po Tisuntiraidapuran 1780–1793	Champa rulers 1790/1793–1799 concurrently with Po Krei Brei: 1790	Succeeded by Po Saong Nyung Ceng 1799–1822
