= Po Ganuhpatih =

- King of Champa; King of Panduranga

King of Champa
- Reign: 1728 to 1730
- Predecessor: Po Saktiraydapatih
- Successor: Po Thuntiraidaputih
- Born: Champa
- Died: 1730; Bal Pangdurang (Phan Rí)
- House: Panduranga
- Religion: Hindu

Po Ganuhpatih (died 1730) was a King of the Panduranga Kingdom of Champa (in Vietnamese, Thuân Thành) who ruled from 1728 to 1730.

His name is also spelt Po Ganvich da Patih.

== Biography ==
Po Ganuhpatih was a grandson of the former king Po Saktiraydapatih, who died at the age of at least seventy. The old king is known to have had at least three sons who served as halau (village lords), but if they were alive at his demise they had no claim to make. After Po Saktiraydapatih's demise, a revolt against Vietnamese overlordship broke out among the Chams of Phan Rí. The background of the resistance may be the influx of Viet settlers and the cultural discrimination of the Chams. The Nguyễn lord Nguyễn Phúc Trú dispatched a military force that reestablished control. In order to reinforce Viet presence, he enjoined more settlers to move to Champa, thus intensifying the rivalty for land and resources.

The role of Po Ganuhpatih in these events is not known in detail. He had died by 1730, and was succeeded, after a brief interregnum, by his distant kinsman Po Thuntiraidaputih.

Preceded by Po Saktiraydapatih 1696–1728	Champa rulers 1728–1730	Succeeded by Po Thuntiraidaputih 1731–1732
