= Po Klan Thu =

- Ruler of Champa

Ruler of Champa
- Reign: 1822–1828
- Predecessor: Po Saong Nyung Ceng
- Successor: Po Phaok The
- Deputy ruler: Po Phaok The

Deputy ruler of Champa
- Reign: 1807–1822
- Predecessor: Po Saong Nyung Ceng
- Successor: Po Phaok The
- Ruler: Po Saong Nyung Ceng
- Born: Champa
- Died: 1828; Băl Canar, Panduranga, Champa (in present-day Phan Rí Cửa, Tuy Phong District, Bình Thuận Province, Vietnam)
- Spouse: Khanh Hoa
- Issue: Po Dhar Kaok
Names
- Po Klan Thu; Nguyễn Văn Vĩnh (阮文永)
Regnal name
- Thuận Thành trấn Khâm sai Thống binh cai cơ (順城鎮欽差統兵該奇)

Po Klan Thu (died 1828) was the ruler of the Principality of Thuận Thành in Champa from 1822 to 1828. His Vietnamese name was Nguyễn Văn Vĩnh (阮文永). He was the penultimate Cham ruler before the assimilation of the polity in the centralized Vietnamese state.

== Appointment by Minh Menh ==
In 1807, Po Klan Thu was appointed as the viceroy or the deputy ruler of Champa. According to some accounts, he married Lady Khanh Hoa, the mother of the Champa ruler Po Saong Nyung Ceng (Nguyễn Văn Chấn). The latter died in 1822 when Po Klan Thu was under surveillance in the capital Huế. Lê Văn Duyệt, the viceroy of Cochinchina, proposed to let Po Phaok The (Nguyễn Văn Thừa) succeed; however, Emperor Minh Mạng wanted Po Bait Lan to be the new ruler. At this sensitive time, a man from Malathit called Ja Lidong revolted and threatened the Bình Thuận province. Reluctantly, Minh Mạng installed Po Klan Thu as the new ruler and sent him back to Champa. Po Phaok The was appointed as his viceroy, or the deputy ruler.

== Rebellions and popular discontent ==
In the following year, 1823, the Cham and Vietnamese troops defeated Ja Lidong's rebels, who dispersed in the hilly region. Eventually, Lê Văn Duyệt persuaded Ja Lidong and his remaining 400 insurgents to surrender. With the rebellion subdued, the inhabitants of Champa had to rebuild destroyed military posts and build a system of defence to protect the Cham capital Bal Canar. At the same time, the people had to deliver wood as requested by the Imperial Court, and the corvée services lowered their esteem for Po Klan Thu.

In 1826, a military dignitary of Po Klan Thu, Kai Nduai Bait, raised the standard of rebellion. The insurrection affected not only the Thuận Thành principality but also Khánh Hòa and Phú Yên and took on a wider anti-Vietnamese character. Po Klan Thu was unable to deal with the movement on his own and requested help from the Imperial Court, which was given. The Vietnamese troops soon defeated and captured Ja Lidong, while Po Klan Thu captured other insurgents by trickery and had some of them executed. After these events, Preace returned to Champa for the time being. The rebellion of Kai Nduai Bait triggered an interest in Minh Mang to gather information about Cham customs, presumably as a means of exercising power. On his orders, the governor of Bình Thuận interviewed Muslim and Hindu religious dignitaries about beliefs, rites, and practices among the Cham population. The information was only provided hesitantly and was then conveyed to Ming Mang.

Po Klan Thu died in 1828. The circumstances are unknown, but he did not pass away in the capital, Bal Canar. On the strong recommendation of Lê Văn Duyệt, the dignitaries of Bal Canar enthroned the deputy ruler Po Phaok The as the new Cham ruler - the last one, as it would turn out. At the same time, Po Klan Thu's son, Po Dhar Kaok, was made the new deputy ruler.

Preceded by Po Saong Nyung Ceng 1799–1822	Champa rulers 1822–1828	Succeeded by Po Phaok The 1828–1832
