= Phạm Dương Mại I =

Fan Yang Mai
- King of Linyi
- Reign: 420–421
- Predecessor: Manorathavarman (Fàn Wéndí)
- Successor: Phạm Dương Mại II
- Died: 421

Fan Yang Mai I or Pham Duong Mai I (Chinese: 范陽邁, Middle Chinese: buam’-jɨaŋ-maɨjh/mɛ:jh) was briefly the king of Lâm Ấp, an Indianized kingdom in present-day Vietnam. He overthrew the previous dynasty and seized the throne in 420, following years of internal trouble. According to the Chinese Book of Jin and Book of Song, after launching an unsuccessful raid in Tonkin, he requested investiture from China in 421. He died in the same year.

His name means "Prince of Gold", and before his death, the Chinese Court recognized him as the King of Champa. He was succeeded by his son Tou, who assumed his father's name.

== Bibliography ==
- Coedès, G. (1968), The Indianized States of Southeast Asia, Honolulu: University of Hawaii Press

Preceded by Manorathavarman (Fàn Wéndí) ?–420	King of Champa; 420–421	Succeeded by Fan Yang Mai II; 421–446
