= Hải Ninh =

Hải Ninh may refer to:

- Hải Ninh, Lâm Đồng, a rural commune of Lâm Đồng province
- Hải Ninh, Hà Tĩnh, a ward of Hà Tĩnh province
- Hải Ninh, Quảng Ninh, a rural commune of Quảng Ninh province
- Hải Ninh (director), Vietnamese director of films including Girl from Hanoi.
