= Po Tisundimahrai =

- King of Champa; King of Panduranga

King of Champa
- Reign: 1763–1765
- Predecessor: Po Rattiraydaputao
- Successor: Po Tisuntiraydapaghoh
- Born: Unknown; Champa
- Died: 1765; Bal Pangdurang (Phan Rí)

Po Tisundimahrai (died 1765) was a King of the Panduranga Kingdom of Champa (in Vietnamese, Thuân Thành) who ruled from 1763 to 1765. The name is also written Po Thathun da Moehrai. He led a brief reign under the domination of the Nguyễn lord of Đàng Trong (South Annam).

== Biography ==
Po Tisundimahrai was a son of the previous ruler, Po Rattiraydaputao. When his father died after a long reign of 28 years, Po Tisundimahrai succeeded him in the year of the Horse (1763) under the auspices of the Vietnamese ruler Võ Vương. He received the title of Kai Bait Mbin (Cai Bab Binh). He died in the year of the Rooster (1765), having reigned for a little over one year. He was succeeded, after a brief interregnum, by a member of another branch of the dynasty, Po Tisuntiraydapaghoh.

Preceded by Po Rattiraydaputao 1735–1763	Champa rulers 1763–1765	Succeeded by Po Tisuntiraydapaghoh 1768–1780
