= Tuấn Phù =

Tuấn Phù (全扶) or Tuan Phaow was a Malay who briefly appeared as resistance leader in the Panduranga Kingdom in Champa (in Vietnamese, Thuận Thành) in the 1790s. His appearance was conditioned by the Tây Sơn wars that engulfed Vietnam in warfare between 1771 and 1802. Very little is known about him.

== Anti-Nguyễn resistance in Champa ==
Champa was the unfortunate object of successive occupations by forces of the Nguyễn and Tây Sơn during the 1770s, 1780s, and 1790s. The Tây Sơn-appointed ruler Po Tisuntiraidapuran was captured and executed by the Nguyễn forces in 1793, and replaced by a loyal person of non-royal origins, Po Ladhuanpuguh. However, the highly disturbed conditions made for resistance movements that turned against the Nguyễn appointee. A Muslim Cham leader from Dã Giang called Po Thong Khang, also known as Tăng Ma, rose against Po Ladhuanpuguh's regime in Băl Canar in 1796, being supported as leader by the Tây Sơn. He was however quickly defeated at Phô Châm by the pro-Nguyễn forces.

== Islam as a rallying call ==
However, peace did not last long. In the same year 1796, a certain Muslim from "Mecca", here meaning Kelantan on the Malay Peninsula, arrived with several followers from Cambodia. Being a Malay nobleman by the name Tuấn Phù or Tuan Phaow, he emerged as leader of the discontented Cham. He established a base at Bicam to the west of the capital Băl Canar, built a fortress and established military training camps, thus raising the banner of rebellion. He organized his rebel movement with the aim to expel the Vietnamese forces from Bình Thuận province and fight the pro-Nguyễn authorities in Băl Canar. The movement took on a strongly Islamic character, as he claimed that he had been sent by God to resist the Vietnamese and was a descendant of the Prophet and the Caliph Ali. Taking the title Lord Bho Radhik, he attacked Vietnamese military posts in conjunction with thousands of Chams from Cambodia and Panduranga, as well as Raglai, Churu and Kahaow adherents. The attack, which took place in the seventh month of 1796, was however swiftly defeated by Po Ladhuanpuguh and his deputy ruler Po Saong Nyung Ceng. Tuấn Phù was wounded and withdrew to the land of the Kahaow. With these events, Tuấn Phù disappears from the historical record and is said to have returned to Kelantan.
