= Po Krei Brei =

- Ruler of Champa

Ruler of Champa
- Reign: 1783-1786, 1790
- Predecessor: Po Tisuntiraidapuran
- Successor: Po Tisuntiraidapuran
- Co-ruler: Po Ladhuanpuguh
- Born: ? Băl Canar, Panduranga, Champa (in present-day Phan Rí Cửa, Tuy Phong District, Bình Thuận Province, Vietnam)
- Died: ? Stung Svay, Cambodia (?)
- Burial: Pali Sakhel, Bình Thuận province, Vietnam
Names
- Po Krei Brei; Muhammad Ali ibn Wan Daim; Nguyễn Văn Chiêu (阮文昭)
Regnal name
- Thuận Thành trấn chưởng cơ (順城鎮掌奇)
- Father: Po Tisuntiraydapaghoh
- Religion: Islam

Po Krei Brei (?–?), also known as Cei Kei Brei, was a ruler of Champa who briefly ruled in 1783-1786 and again in 1790. His Vietnamese name was Nguyễn Văn Chiêu (阮文昭). His Muslim name was Muhammad Ali ibn Wan Daim. He had a short and unstable rule in the shadow of the Tây Sơn wars that engulfed Vietnam between 1771 and 1802, and subsequently took refuge in Cambodia.

== Appointment by the Tây Sơn ==
Po Krei Brei was a Cham prince, being the son of King Po Tisuntiraydapaghoh. He was born in a Year of the Rooster (1753? 1765?). When his father was executed by the Tây Sơn ruler Nguyễn Nhạc in 1780 due to the treacherous acts of Po Tisuntiraidapuran (Nguyễn Văn Tá), Po Krei Brei was staying in Cambodia. Po Tisuntiraidapuran was able to access the feeble Cham throne for a short time. The returning Po Krei Brei proved his father's innocence. According to the Cham cronicles, Po Tisuntiraidapuran was forced to flee in 1781, although Vietnamese sources suggest that he was ruler in 1782 when he gave his allegiance to the Tây Sơn. After an interregnum, Nguyễn Nhạc appointed Po Krei Brei ruler of the Cham lands with the title chaṅ or Po ca.

== Imprisonment and second appointment ==
As it seems, he had very little power since his land had become a battlefield in the struggle between the Tây Sơn brothers and the Nguyễn lord Nguyễn Ánh. Also, Cham partisans on either side increased the insecurity. In 1786, Po Krei Brei had to flee for "the ferocity of the Old Vietnamese [Nguyễn partisans]", taking family members and loyal troops into the wilderness. The group suffered from sickness and hardship, and the mother and a daughter of the ruler died. Later on, Po Krei Brei was betrayed and captured by Tây Sơn partisans and brought to Bujai and later to the Cham capital Phanri where his rival Po Tisuntiraidapuran had once again been enthroned. He was treated poorly, interrogated and threatened with execution. However, an attack on Phanri by Nguyễn troops in 1790 enabled him to escape. In the same year, Nguyễn Ánh retook Gia Định (present-day Ho Chi Minh City). By default, Po Krei Brei thus ended up on the Nguyễn side in the war.

Po Krei Brei and another Cham lord, Po Ladhuanpuguh (Nguyễn Văn Hào), received appointments in 1790 as co-rulers of Champa by Nguyễn Ánh. Po Krei Brei was the civilian governor with the title chưởng cơ, while Po Ladhuanpuguh served as the military governor with the title cai cơ. Since then, Champa was regarded as a province by Vietnam, instead of a country.

== Exile to Cambodia ==
Not long after, Po Krei Brei was deposed since he had committed a fault, which is not specified in the sources. He said he was "tired of all the fights; I wanted to lead my people in search for a land". He and his family and followers were forced to seek refuge in Cambodia in 1795-1796, settling at Roka Po Pram, Thbong Khmum province (now Kampong Cham). He stayed there with his followers until a Siamese invasion of Cambodia in 1812 forced him to flee back into Vietnam. Unable to join the Cambodian king Ang Chan II, he proceeded to Gia Định where he sought the protection of Emperor Gia Long (Nguyễn Ánh). Krei Brei was permitted to settle with a military garrison in Tây Ninh where he and a hundred followers received five hundred tiên (mace) for their subsistence. The Cham colony had a defensive role, and Krei Brei successfully suppressed a rebellion against the Vietnamese authorities, led by a certain Sulutan.

Po Krei Brei's autobiographical account indicates that the prince alternated between Vietnam and Cambodia, and the preface says: "In this Year of the Serpent [1821?], we are truly at peace in Stung Svay [in Cambodia] where, brothers, there is an abundance of coconuts, oranges and sugar." His date of death is not known. The grave monument of the prince is found in the old Cham lands in Bình Thuận province; it is not certain that he actually died there. He had a son, Po Nong, who remained in Cambodia and died around 1845. Another son, Phu Vi, co-administered the Cham colonists in Tây Ninh. In the historical literature Po Krei Brei has often been confused with a later ruler, Po Saong Nyung Ceng, who is erroneously credited with the flight to Cambodia.

In the Archives royales du Champa, there are two records about him: CAM-37 and CAM-38.

Preceded by Po Tisuntiraidapuran 1780–1781	Champa rulers 1783-1786, concurrently with Po Ladhuanpuguh; 1790	Succeeded by Po Tisuntiraidapuran 1786-1793
