= Harivarman III =

King of Champa

- Raja-di-raja

King of Champa
- Reign: 1007-1018
- Coronation: 1007
- Predecessor: Yang Pu Ku Vijaya Sri
- Successor: unknown
- Born: Unknown
- Died: 1018; Nha Trang
Names
- Śrī Hrīvarmmadeva
- Religion: Mahayana Buddhism, Hinduism

Harivarman III (Chinese: 施離霞離鼻麻底; pinyin: Shīlí Xiálíbímádǐ; Cham: Śrī Harivarmadeva, Vietnamese: Ha Lê Bạt Ma), was a king of Champa, ruled the kingdom from 1007 to 1018.

In 1008, a civil war between Harivarman III and general Pam̃r Rauṅ broke out in Champa. Pam̃r Rauṅ was suppressed. In 1010, he sent an embassy to Song China to seek investiture, and five years later he sent another embassy. During these envoys, the Cham brought Champa rice to China.

An inscription dated 1013 records:

"In [the year] of the Śaka king 935. This was the time when Y.P.K the victorious Śrī Harivarmadeva ruled the country of Campā from Rūlauy to the Far East; where Paṅrauṅ; where Paṅrauṅ (native) of Dauk Jā in the area (paliy) of Manicya was general there; where (the latter) was at Panrāṅ: where he restored (punaḥ) the capatī and gave (the image of) his highness the little [goddess]."

— Po Nagar inscription, Nha Trang

Harivarman III died in 1018 and was succeeded by an unknown ruler.

== Bibliography ==
- Griffiths, Arlo; Lepoutre, Amandine; Southworth, William A.; Phần, Thành (2009). "Études du corpus des inscriptions du Campa III, Épigraphie du Campa 2009-2010. Prospection sur le terrain, production d'estampages, supplément à l'inventaire" (PDF). Bulletin de l'École française d'Extrême-Orient. 95–96: 435–497. doi:10.3406/befeo.2008.6118.
- Maspero, Georges (2002). The Champa Kingdom. White Lotus Co., Ltd. ISBN 978-9-74753-499-3.
- Bulliet, Richard W.; Crossley, Pamela Kyle; Headrick, Daniel R.; Johnson, Steven Hirsch (2008). The Earth and Its Peoples: A Global History, Brief Edition, Volume I: To 1550: A Global History. Cengage Learning. ISBN 978-0-618-99238-6.

Preceded by Yang Pu Ku Vijaya Sri ?–?	King of Champa; 1008–1018	Succeeded by Yang Pu Ku Sri ?–?
