= Principality of Thuận Thành =

Panduranga under Nguyễn Lord's protectorate

Principality of Thuận Thành Thuận Thành trấn 順城鎮 Pāṇḍuraṅga Paṅrauṅ / Panrāṅ
- 1695–1832
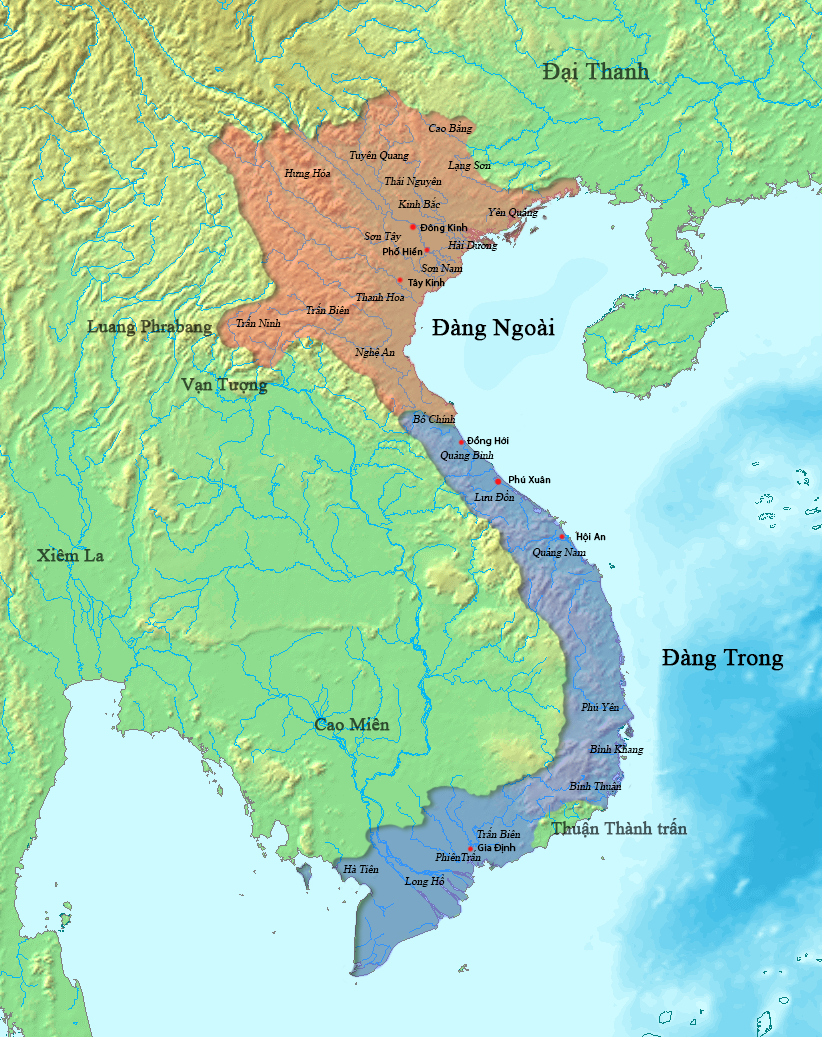
- Location of the principality of Thuận Thành (1757)
- Capital: Băl Canar; 11°10′26″N 108°33′58″E
- Common languages: Cham (Akhar Thrah & Jawi); Malay; Chru; Roglai; Vietnamese
- Religion: Cham folk religion, Hinduism (Cham Balamon), Shiite Bani Islam, Sunni Islam, Buddhism
- Government: Monarchy under Vietnamese overlordship, then Selective monarchy (1793–1832)
- King
  - 1695–1727: Po Saktiraydapatih
  - 1828–1832 (last Cham ruler): Po Phaok The
- Historical era: Early modern
  - Established: 1695
  - Absorbed into Empire of Vietnam: 1832
  - Neo-Champa (Ja Thak Wa and Po War Palei): 1834–35

Population
  - 1750: 500,000
Preceded by	Succeeded by
Panduranga	Nguyễn dynasty
- Today part of: Vietnam

Principality of Thuận Thành, commonly known to the Cham as Pänduranga or Prangdarang, neologism Panduranga Champa, was the last Cham state that centered around the modern day city of Phan Rang in south-central Vietnam. Both Thuận Thành of Vietnamese perspectives and Panduranga were mutually used to refer to the last Cham polity. The decline and fading of Champa did not happen in a short period. Instead, for a long period from the late 17th century to 1832, Panduranga had been confined as an ad hoc client state of various Vietnamese dominions, but still maintained its faint independence. After a Cham revolt in 1692–94 and pressures from Cham king Po Saktiraydapatih, Southern Vietnamese lord Nguyễn Phúc Chu abolished his annexation of Panduranga and revived the Champa kingdom under the byname of Trấn Thuận Thành or the Principality of Thuận Thành, effectively made it a client state of the Nguyễn domain throughout the 18th century. Constant upheavals, social unrest, and the Tay Son rebellion in Dai Viet overthrew the ruling Nguyen and Trinh domains and Le dynasty during the late 18th century, and as long civil wars between Vietnamese factions raged, the principality of Thuận Thành continued to survive until summer 1832 when Vietnamese emperor Minh Mang annexed and incorporated the kingdom of Thuận Thành into his territory, decisively marking the final demise of the millennial Champa Kingdoms.

== Thuận Thành from 1695 to 1774 ==
=== Panduranga Champa under Nguyen suzerainty (1695–1774) ===
In 1712, the Nguyen lord Nguyễn Phúc Chu and king Po Saktiraydapatih signed a five-term treaty, stamping the last stage of Champa as it had become a client state of the Nguyen kingdom. Under the twilight of dominance by the Nguyen, Panduranga disoriented from a maritime-based to an all-isolationist kingdom, tangled to the Nguyen dictation. Champa lost its thriving religious and trading network apparatus with the extra Malay-Islamic world. Malay influences in Champa dissipated rapidly. Cham seafaring traditions were gradually fading away. Following the break between Panduranga and the Islamic world, Islamization in Panduranga Champa progressed in its way of localization.

The Nguyen embraced settler colonialism, opening paths to (Vietnamese) Kinh settlement in Panduranga. Vietnamese were subjected to the Nguyen court while the Cham royal court was barely granted management over the Cham people. Among this new settler minority group was the sense of egoistic cultural superiority toward non-Kinh peoples after the subjugations over Panduranga and indigenous tribes as they looked down on the Cham and non-Kinh subjects. Some of them were filibusters and could conduct their own business above Cham laws without being prosecuted by the Cham judiciary. Even the Cham king had no authority over them. Life in Panduranga gradually turned into dismalness for the Cham.

By 1695 Kinh villages and loosely-governed hamlets with no definitive border inside Panduranga popped up in An Phước, west of Phan Rang; Hàm Thuận (Phan Thiết, where the headquarters of Bình Thuận was placed); Hòa Ða (east of Phan Rí), and scattered across the Cham rural, approximately 200 villages in total. Lands and alms were wildly dispossessed away from the original inhabitants. Under the political protection of the Nguyen court, the Kinh settlers did everything to seize assets from the Cham. It was common for nefarious Kinh dealers to carry out usury with an interest rate of 150% per annum for either Cham officials or Cham folks, leading to many local families who could not afford falling into malicious debt traps and misery while the Kinh settlers benefited and strengthened their economic acquisition and financial dominance. Also, after the 17th century onward information about the highland indigenous peoples became more abundant. This may be the result of expanding Vietnamese political dominance in the area. At the same time, the Cham were hired by the Viet as bureaucrats to administrate the indigenous peoples; collecting tax; providing precious products and corvée labor to the Vietnamese overlords, as the Cham had extensively experienced in relationship with the indigenous highland peoples before.

In 1728, a Cham revolt against Nguyen oppression in Panduranga was quickly overrun. Another Cham rebellion led by Dương Bao Lai and Diệp Mã Lăng erupted in 1746 but was quickly put down by Vietnamese garrison troops from Nha Trang.

=== Beginning of Cham communities in the Mekong Delta ===
Cham Muslims who fled the Nguyen occupation and ought to continue the disrupted Cham-Malay-Islamic connection and refugees from the Vietnamese, migrating to the Mekong Delta and coastal Cambodia. Cham-Malay settlers in Cambodia and the western corners of the Mekong Delta of the 18th century began establishing communities and religious networks around Chau Doc and Ha Tien. They maintained strong links with Cambodian Chams, whose majority had switched to Perso-Arabic Jawi script for writings.

Today, the Mekong Delta Chams use both Jawi, Cham variant of Arabic, and Latinized Cham for their vernacular writing. Also nowadays, the Cham Sunni/Western Cham jama'ah (communities) of An Giang, Mekong Delta, and Cambodia often express a notion to the Bani that the Sunni are more positively educated, scientific, and religiously superior because of their orthodox faiths and upholding the teachings of Islam correctly, while the Cham Bani often rebuke the Cham Sunni for their neglect of traditional Cham culture and Cham history, abandonment of traditional akhar thrah Cham script and rejection of the muk kei (ancestor spirits) ritual, the basis of Cham ethnic identity. In the Mekong Delta, practicing Islam likely makes a person a Cham, unambiguously, more important than being of Cham descent. In his tome, Nakamura suggests that the ethnic identity of Cham in the Mekong Delta is constructed and legitimized around the religion of Islam.

The leader of the ruling Mac dynasty of Ha Tien, Mac Cuu, a vassal of Cambodia, housed a strong orthodox Sunni Muslim community of Cham and Malays, including elements of Sufism and Shafi. Gradually, the Mekong Delta Cham intermingled themselves with Cambodian Cham communities. Cambodian Chams retain a unique Islamic tradition that had fused Cham, Khmer, and Malay influences. In 1757, Buddhist lord Nguyễn Phúc Khoát launched a persecution against the overwhelming Christian population of Saigon, burning several churches, and forced the Christians to flee to Ha Tien and Siam. Ha Tien was occupied by the Tay Son in 1777–1789. In 1794–1795 Ha Tien was raided by a Malay fleet consisting of 17 junks of Siak Sultan Sayyid Ali. Ha Tien still had a Malay presence till the mid 19th century.

== Thuận Thành during the Tay Son period ==
During the Tayson rebellion (1771–1789) as the Nguyen were overthrown, discord among the Cham elites soared, with one faction advocating for a pro-Tayson position, and one opposite arguing for pro-Nguyen. Panduranga was engulfed in a battleground of intra-Vietnamese civil war. The Tay Son briefly invaded Panduranga in 1773, then pushed further south in 1777. From 1783 to 1786, the pro-Tay Son faction leader prince Po Cei Brei was bestowed the governor of Panduranga by the Tay Son. His brother Po Tisuntiraidapuran switched allegiance to the Tay Son rebels, ruling as king of pro-Tayson Panduranga from 1786 to 1793.

In 1792-93 during the subsequent Tay Son–Nguyen war, Nguyen Anh and his loyalists retook Panduranga from the Tay Son. King Po Tisuntiraidapuran was captured by the pro-Nguyen Cham forces led by Po Ladhuanpuguh, then was convicted for anti-Nguyen behavior and received death sentence in Ðồng Nai. Many Cham refugees fled to Cambodia. Tuan Phaow, a Muslim leader, allegedly originating from Makah, Kelantan, led an anti-Nguyen rebellion in 1795–1796. Amid rampant instability and perturbed, he reportedly having brought many Sunni Muslim fighters (jawa-kur) from Cambodia back to Vietnam.

== Further Vietnamese colonization of the Mekong Delta: Cham-Malay settlements ==
During the latter half of the 18th century, to extend their economic capability and development on the frontiers, the Nguyen brought many Cambodian Cham émigré and Malays to settle in their military plantations (đôn điên) in the Mekong Delta, particularly at Tây Ninh and Châu Đốc. Nguyen documents often regarded them as Chàm or Chàm Chà Và (藍爪哇, Cham-Java/Chvea) with implications of them being Cambodian Cham exilarchs that had fled Champa in the past to Cambodia rather than directly came from Champa. There was no clear difference to address the Malay in Cambodia and Malay came from the Malay Peninsula and the Indonesian archipelago; they were just simply referred to as Đô Bà (闍婆). These transnational Cham and Malay settlements played crucial roles in the later Vietnamese annexation of Cambodia during the 1810s-1840 cause they were deemed to be used by the Vietnamese to consolidate Nguyen control over Khmer areas and the Mekong Delta generally.

== Last years of Panduranga ==
=== The Satrapy of Panduranga ===
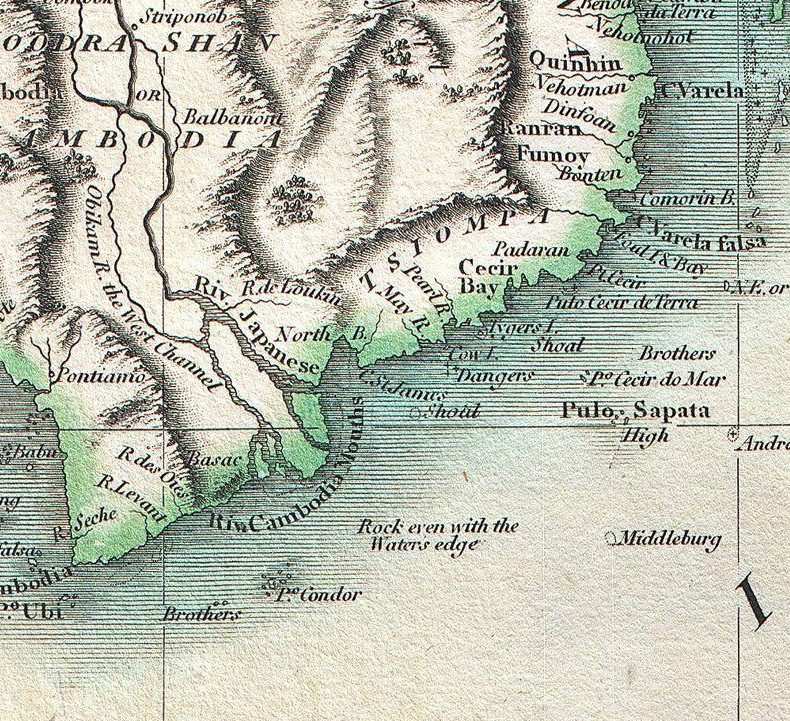
Panduranga Champa (Tsiompa) in John Cary's 1801 Map of the East Indies and Southeast Asia

In 1793, king Tisuntiraidapuran was demoted and then executed, replaced by a pro-Nguyen official Po Ladhuanpuguh (r. 1793–1799). Since then, the Cham monarchy had been reduced to a quasi-satrapy with an appointed ruler instead of being ruled by a hereditary dynasty. After defeating the Tayson and having conquered the whole of Vietnam, Nguyen Anh was enthroned as Emperor Gia Long of Vietnam's newly Nguyen dynasty. He reconstituted his kingdom's administration and appointed his loyal military comrades of Cham ethnicity to rule Panduranga autonomously. Panduranga was given an extraterritorial status. The Cham court was obligated to provide privileges to ethnic Kinh settlers in Panduranga and must give military assistance to the Huế court, once being requested. Panduranga's resources were chief subjects of exploitation by the Vietnamese court in many ways.

Also, the Cham ruler had to provide the Vietnamese court with corvee labors to the Huế court just like Gia Long's every year, despite Gia Long having imperative declared that Panduranga was not a Vietnamese province or part of his kingdom.

=== Thuận Thành under Gia Long (1802–1820) ===
Under the domination of the first ruler of new Vietnam, Panduranga saw a significant change in its political direction and status. Although retaining their autonomy from the Vietnamese benefactor, the Cham political elites had increasingly collaborated with and pledged unquestionably loyalty to the Vietnamese Huế court, helping to expand Vietnamese influence beyond Panduranga-Champa's politics and society. The Cham ruling class and aristocracy, Mohamed Effendy comments, were unable to make a change that would affect their social status, were more willing to be subservient to the Vietnamese overlordship rather than endeavoring to struggle against the new order. Through this way, Panduranga Champa was rapidly melting away per se.

In 1799, Ladhuanpuguh died. Po Saong Nhung Ceng (r. 1799–1822), a minor official and early comrade of Gia Long, was assigned as king of Panduranga and received the appellation Chưởng Cơ (Ceng Kei – lord).

=== Minh Mang versus Le Van Duyet (1820–1832) ===
Gia Long was succeeded by his fourth son, Minh Mang (or Ming ni Mang in Eastern Cham dialect). He was an admirer of Chinese culture, a Confucian student, and a sadistic machiavellian autocrat. His ruling style is characterized by a repressive policy against foreigners (especially from Europe), and intolerance against the diversity, dissent, and minority groups in his own realm. The Nguyen neo-Confucian fundamentalist court shut off nearly all trade activities and diplomacy between Vietnam and the outside world. The reign of Minh Mang over Vietnam was also poisoned by incessant waves of stagnation, epidemics, rebellions, social upheavals, and wars across Vietnam and with neighboring Siam, mainly underlying by his rigid principiums.

Premodern Vietnam during the early 19th century was not a centralized kingdom by any mean. Minh Mang’s first procedure was readministrating Vietnam and increasing centralization. He had personal and political detest for Hanoi and Saigon Viceroys and Viziers Le Chat and Le Van Duyet, but was not outspoken. The grand governors were skeptical of Minh Mang and tried to prevent his expanding authority, virtually dragging Champa in between Minh Mang-Le Van Duyet political confrontation. In the south, Viceroy Duyet of Saigon proved to be much more influential and powerful over Panduranga and Mekong Delta, his sphere of influence and his ties with Chakri Siam and Catholic missionaries frightened Minh Mang, who was very concerning about his absolute power and ready to consolidate the administrative section and remove the Viceroyalties and other competing factions.

==== Start of Cham resistance ====
Beginning in 1822 with the newly appointed king Po Klan Thu (r. 1822–1828), Minh Mang began tightening his grips over Panduranga. In reaction to the new ruler of Vietnam, the Cham also started resisting against Minh Mang, deprecating the new Cham ruler of his increasing echo and dependence on the Vietnamese court, fear of losing their sovereignty to Vietnamese subversion while Po Klan Thu had been becoming a de facto puppet of Minh Mang. Tensions in Panduranga accelerated. In 1822, revolt led by Ja Lidong sparked the outcry against Vietnamese backing of Cham gentry. Anxiety grew. The coast of Panduranga had been in complete Vietnamese control since 1822. Trade with Chinese and British ships was measured all skeptical.

Endless exploitation, harassment, and oppression tamed the land of Panduranga. The peoples were overworked and exhausted cutting and transporting exotic timbers and emeralds from the highlands, building dams, ships, and infrastructures, or constructing palaces for Minh Mang. Men and women were convoked to defoliate forests, making clearance for Vietnamese military garrisons. Fields were abandoned.

The Vietnamese authority then began to conduct a population census in Champa to collect demographic assets and raise taxes. Heavy harvest taxes were enforced on Cham peasant households, and those who did not obey to pay those taxes annually or evaded taxes would be arrested, being tortured outdoor under hot weather conditions for three days while suffering dehydration or suffocation until willing submission.

The highlanders faced more racial discrimination and strict regulations by the Huế court. Most likely, the Nguyen were attempting to sow rhetoric and aversion between the Cham with the highlanders, creating ethnic gerrymandering. In the early 19th century, Cham and Churu men were forced to join the army for 54 years routine. Cham were not allowed to build their ships or make a sail. The Vietnamese authority also expropriated Cham salt-producing and salt-derived product (i.e. fish sauces) facilities, redistributing them to Kinh businessmen.

After two noteworthy anti-Vietnamese Ja Lidong rebellion (1822–23) and Nduai Kabait rebellion (1826) failed, Minh Mang instrumented the beginning of his Vietnamization cultural policies on Panduranga, with aim of forced replacement of traditional Cham culture with Vietnamese court culture.

==== Minh Mang-Le Van Duyet dispute over Thuận Thành ====
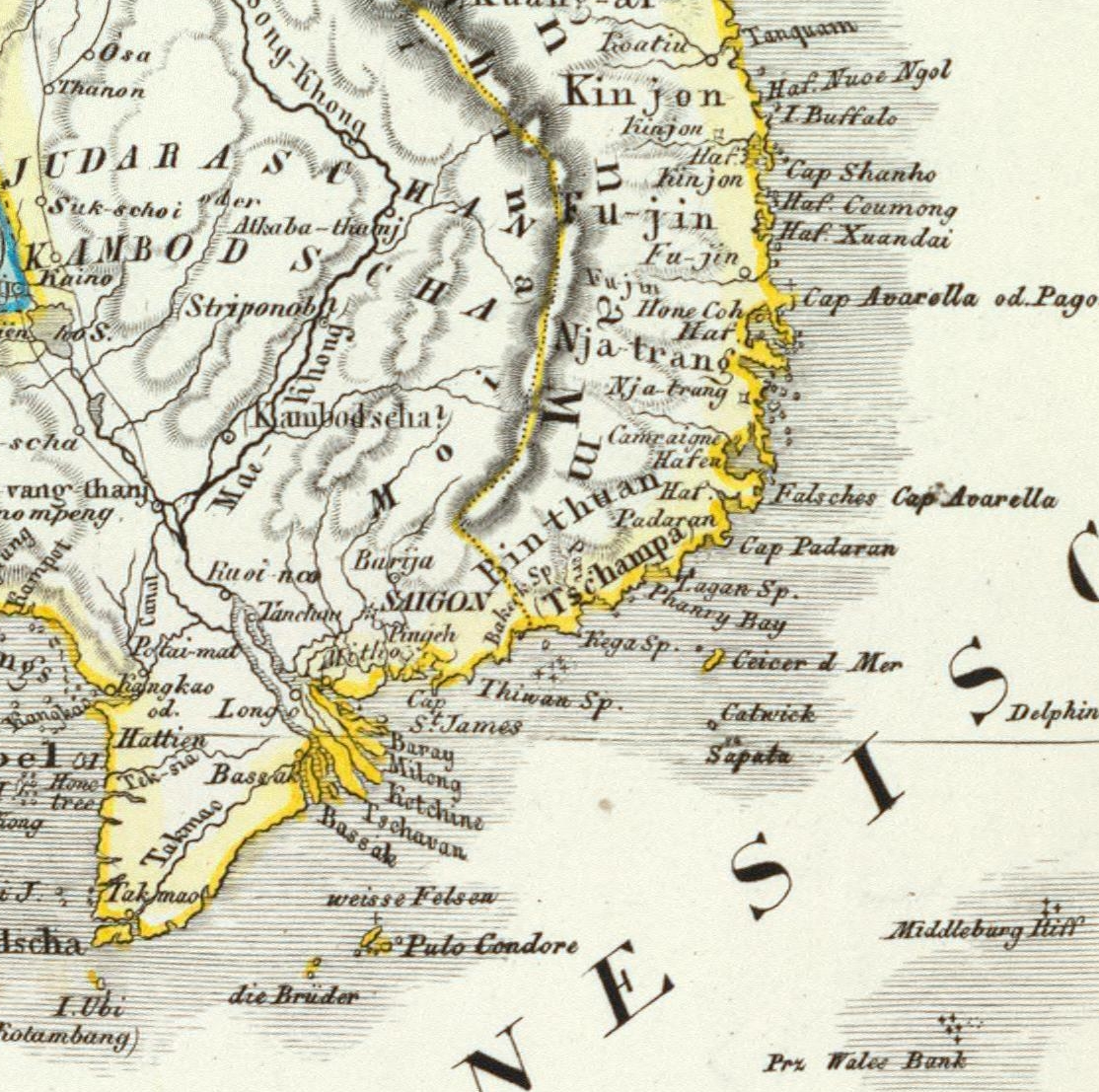
The defunct Kingdom of (Ts)Champa (in brackets) in Heinrich Kiepert's 1856 Map of the East Indies.

In 1828, Po Phaok The (r. 1829–1832) was appointed as the new king of Panduranga after governor Duyet's decision, and it is unknown if the new king had been yet approved by Minh Mang. The Cham yet had constantly leaned toward Saigon and preferred paying taxes to Governor Duyet instead of paying to Huế. In his acumen, Minh Mang enquired that if Panduranga was his vassal, unthinkably why did they lean to the Saigon Viceroyalty, which is against the king's favor and an act of betrayal, despite the Cham leadership had never desired such en mesonge. However, Governor Duyet openly dodged Minh Mang's attempt to take over Panduranga and reprieved the Cham briefly from Minh Mang’s demands. In the campaign of Minh Mang to subjugate Panduranga, Duyet was the sole obstacle. Caught between two rival Vietnamese factions, it foreshadowed the overcoming fate of Champa.

Seeing king Po Phaok The’s tribute payments and increasingly alignment to Governor Duyet, pro-Huế Cham officials secretly reported it to Minh Mang. Not tolerant of this, Minh Mang in early 1832 ordered the summoning of Po Thaok The, compelling Panduranga to resume payment of tributes and taxes directly to Huế.

=== Minh Mang annexation of Panduranga ===
"...The king was dethroned. The kingdom was dismantled. The young were constrained from obeying their elders. Nephews were obligated to cut their family ties with their maternal uncles. Members of clans were obliged to act like the Kinh and [could even] bring legal action against member [sic] of the family. Dignitaries, of whatever title or whatever lineage, were forced unto wear Viet pants. The people suffered greatly, and wondered if thy had any future..."

— (Note: CM (Cham manuscript) 30-15, p. 116. These anonymous Cham hand accounts composed of prose rhymes and varying glyphs were created by commoners who eyewitnessed and experienced events in Champa from their own perspectives.)

In August 1832, three days after the death of the Viceroy of Saigon–Le Van Duyet, who had pardoned Panduranga for four years, Minh Mang of Vietnam took the opportunity, ordering the annexation of Panduranga and held the incumbent Cham king Po Phaok The (Po Thak The) as a royal hostage in Huế palace. The Kingdom of Champa officially ceased to exist after having lasted for nearly 2000 years.

Minh Mang’s administration immediately imposed new acculturation policies and heavy taxes, perpetually intending to de-Chamizate his new province. These new excessive policies enforced the Cham to adopt the practicing of Vietnamese court cultural (High Sino-Vietnamese culture) and religious standards; educational, language, and writing indoctrinations, which is collectively known as forced assimilation. Cultural repression against Cham and other indigenous peoples were aggressively perpetuated to demoralize them, forcing Bani to give up their faiths. Cham religions, Bani and Balamon, were strictly outlawed. Liturgy was banned. Mosques were razed to the ground. The Ramawan and Waha (Eid al-Adha) were completely forbidden. Dissents and supporters of Le Van Duyet were also purged and eradicated. Panduranga was dismantled and readministrated into Vietnam proper. Minh Mang's same ethnic assimilation policies were also not just implemented in Panduranga, but also took place in Southern Vietnam and Cambodia with the same pace.

A Khâm Mạng (literally known as "temporary assigned") official was sent to Panduranga as the head of the new magistrate office, the supervising surrogate of Minh Mang. It was designed to flex and oversee Minh Mang's new intolerant policies, purging Cham individuals who were suspected to be supporters of Duyet. To ensure his authoritarian framework be operational in Panduranga, Minh Mang permitted Kinh militia outside local garrisons to butcher three Cham persons every day with rewards and no repentance.

== Post-Panduranga and aftermath ==
=== Minh Mang's violent seizure in Panduranga ===
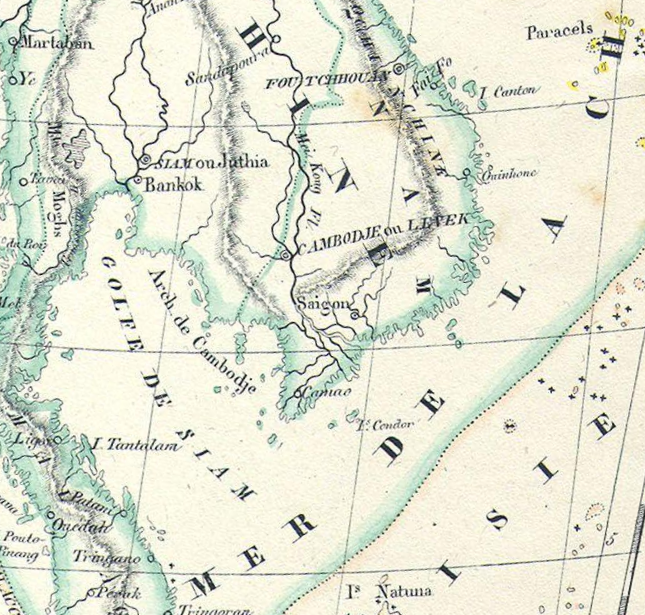
French map of Southeast Asia (created in 1836, four years after the Vietnamese annexation of Champa) showing no trace of Champa-Panduranga.

Now being unopposed in defunct Champa, Minh Mang began his purge in old Panduranga against Chams who aligned with Le Van Duyet. Several Cham officials and clerics were prosecuted, jailed, sent to exile, or executed, and their properties were confiscated. Shortly after the purge, the Khâm Mạng office ordered the Cham to "correct" and practice Vietnamese customs forcibly. They banned the Cham Bani and Sunnis to exercise Ramawan month and Cham Ahier to worship ancestors, forcing the clerics and the Imams to break religious prohibitions, and ordered a complete erasure of traditional Cham social hierarchy. Cham culture was aggressively eliminated. In Cambodia, Minh Mang created two infantry regiments that were exclusively made up of Cham and Malay recruits, consisting of 1,600 Muslim troops, to guard his new province.

The Vietnamese representative office further ordered rapid assimilation of the Chams, pushing Panduranga into Vietnamese administration. Mandatory heavy taxes, social structures, land programs, corvee labor and military services were imposed. Brutal punishments were available for those who dared to oppose.

=== Cham resistance and aftermath ===
A series of Cham revolts broke out. Khaṭīb Sumat, a Cambodian Cham Baruw and religious teacher who might have studied Islam in the Malaysian Peninsula, was angered hearing the news that Minh Mang had annexed Champa. He immediately returned to Vietnam and provoke an uprising inspired Islamic prophecies against Minh Mang in the summer of 1833. The revolt failed in early 1834 as Sumat had lost most of his supporters to Ja Thak Wa, a Bani companion from Văn Lâm village, Ninh Thuận, and one of Sumat's original participators, who criticized Sumat's fanatical Islamic extremism and sycophantic behaviors.

The Second Cham uprising (1834–35) was led by Ja Thak Wa, and was accomplished by a multiethnic Champa conference. The New Champa revolutionaries successfully managed to take many towns, driving off the Nguyen army, and gained control over a vast area in Central Vietnam by spring 1835. Astonishing Minh Mang reacted by ordering his troops to unleash a bloody reign of terror over Champa, aiming to intimidate the revolution's supporters.

After much fightings and turbulences, Ja Thak Wa and Po War Palei were killed by the Vietnamese in May 1835, while other leaders and members of the movement either were executed or sent to slave labor camps.

In July 1835, Minh Mang ordered the executions of the former king Po Phaok The and vice king Cei Dhar Kaok, reportedly being accused of inspiring Le Van Khoi's blasphemous plot against the court, by slow-slicing.

To release his anger, from the summer of 1835, Minh Mang issued the destruction of Champa. Cham cemeteries and royal tombs were smashed and vandalized. Temples were demolished. The temple of king Po Rome was lit on fire. Cham were evicted from their lands. Most Cham villages and towns, especially aquatic villages along the coast, had been razed and annihilated. Around seven to twelve Cham villages were scrambled to the ground. A Cham document recounts: "If you go along the coast from Panrang to Parik, you will see, Prince and Lord, that there are no more Cham houses (on the coast)." Consequently, the Cham had totally lost their ancestors' seafaring and shipbuilding traditions.

Another Cham uprising occurred in 1836 led by two Cham sisters Thị Tiết and Thị Cân Oa, two of royal descent. (Note: MMCY, VI, pp. 160–161) It is noticeable that many prolific members of the high royal family of Panduranga also joined the resistance. After all, to prevent further Cham resistance movements, Minh Mang decided to displace the Cham population and scatter them interleaved next to Kinh villages while shutting off communication between lowlander Cham and highlander tribes. (Note: DNTLCB, XVI, p. 289) Indigenous highland peoples, their livelihoods, and their tracks, were kept under heavy surveillance.

Ming Mang's successors Thieu Tri and Tu Duc reverted most of their grandfather’s policies on religious restriction and ethnic assimilation, and the Cham were reallowed to practice their religions.

=== Colonial temporary and renewal of Cham struggle during 20th century ===
When the French acquisition of Vietnam and later Indochina in the late 1880s had been finished, only a small fraction, 40,000 Cham people in the old Panduranga remained. The French colonial administration prohibited Kinh discrimination and prejudice against Cham and indigenous highland peoples, putting an end to Vietnamese cultural genocide of the Cham.

During the Second World War, the Vietnamese monarchy and French colonial rule were overthrown. Vietnam was divided into two halves in 1955 following the First Indochina War. The Saigon (Republic of Vietnam) government of Ngo Dinh Diem seized minority lands for Northern Kinh refugees and arranged racist assimilation programs against ethnic minorities. This resulted in increasing nationalist sentiment among the Cham and indigenous peoples of Central Vietnam that had been once brutally subjugated by Minh Mang a century ago and then felt being abused and discriminated against by the South Vietnamese government. During the Vietnam war, some Cham nationalists joined the communist NFL, and some others joined the FLC and FLHPC Front de Libeùration des Hauts Plateaux du Champa (Liberation of Highlands and Champa), later were combined into the Front Unifieù de Lutte des Races Opprimeùes (FULRO) to organize political and insurgent actions against the government of the Republic of Vietnam.

Cham temples and heritages faced massive destruction during the Vietnam War. Intense fighting and bombing operations had leveled down magnificent Cham temples and remnants of ancient Cham cities across the old Champa to just crumbling ruins barely unrecognizable. Many thousand-years old holy sites, such as My Son A1, were lost forever.

The Post Vietnam War period saw the government of the new unified Socialist Republic of Vietnam crushing political dissent, including the FULRO, because the organization was equally anti-government, anticommunist, and anti-Vietnamese (anti-Kinh). The Western Cham were subjected to ruthless Communist Khmer Rouge ethnic cleansing in the late 1970s, which resulted in up 200,000 Cambodian Cham of half of Cambodia's Cham population being murdered in the KR extermination fields. The Khmer Rouge also tried to wipe out Cham culture in Cambodia by destroying religious schools, mosques, Quranic books, and ancient texts about Champa, banning Cham names and language, and completely obliterated Cambodian Cham culture in process. Their greatest suffering during the Cambodian genocide is still not outrightly acknowledged due to the victimizers and victims issues problematized by nationalist rhetoric.

=== Current status of the Chams ===
The Cham now are simply seen as one among 54 ethnic groups that constitute Vietnam's contrived 'greater Vietnamese family' rather than being acknowledged as indigenous. Constructing images of ethnoreligious peace and partnership are VCP's main objectives in their ethnic interests. Cham irredentism or separatism are virtually nonexistent. Despite that, the possibility of reconciliation has never happened. Pro-minority right activism is also absent. The majority (Vietnamese) Kinh attitude toward the Cham and indigenous peoples of Vietnam has not changed positively since then. To the majority of Vietnamese society, the persistent existence of non-Kinh communities is alienating, and stranger, with many desensitized stereotypes. To the indigenous highland peoples of the Central Highland, the matter is worsening as their lands are taken over by the 'civilizing forces' of Kinh internal colonialism, which has massively increased since 1975. Usually, integration into mainstream Kinh society is synonymous with being "civilized" and law-abiding. Cham culture and festivals have been modified in order to accommodate Kinh culture. The majority of Vietnam's national scholarship, largely Communist party-guided, and state media usually deny or minimize the metaphysical existence of ethnocentrism, marginalization, racial inequality, and discrimination in recent Vietnamese past and modern Vietnam, leading to the overlooked presence of widespread institutional racism against the Cham, the Khmer, and indigenous peoples, devoid of reprimand. In recent decades, haphazard efforts had been carried out purportedly to transform Cham ruins into tourist destinations.

In the current national history of Vietnam, neither Cham history nor indigenous peoples' history is reckoned genuinely from their own or independent narrative but is only represented as a 'peripheral, supplemental, orientalist part' of the disproportionately overrepresented Vietnamese 'core history' (ethnocentric Viet history). Cham historical and cultural importance is downplayed as parts of the collective heritage of the 'Vietnamese nation,' and Cham monuments and relics are designated as only parts of that 'national heritage' whole dedicated for tourist activities. As long as Cham cultural heritages are being used by the SRV government for tourism, compassionate Cham history becomes less prevalent in contemporaries, and their civilization is simply getting forgotten.

== See also ==
- Cham literature
- Sakkarai dak rai patao
- Panduranga (Champa)
- Champa (Ja Thak Wa)
- History of Champa
