= Ja Lidong rebellion =

1822–1823 rebellion in Vietnam

Date	August 1822 – March 1823
Location	Principality of Thuận Thành (Panduranga), modern-day Southern Vietnam.
Result	Cease fire negotiated, voluntary surrender of Ja Lidong

Belligerents
Ja Lidong rebels	Vietnamese court: Viceroyalty of Gia Định; Principality of Thuận Thành

Commanders and leaders
Ja Lidong	Po Klan Thu; Thái Văn Thuận

Strength
Unknown	Unknown

Casualties and losses
400 surrendered	None

The Ja Lidong rebellion was a Cham anti-Vietnamese rebellion led by a Cham leader named Ja Lidong in 1822–23. Ja Lidong was either a Cham or a highlander, and his multi-ethnic revolt consisted of both Cham and highlanders of Churu, Raglai, Koho backgrounds.

From 1799 onward, the Vietnamese Nguyen court effectively turned Panduranga, the last Cham (Champa) polity, into a Vietnamese semisatrapy, with nominal rulers appointed by Gia Long and his son Minh Mang. The recent ruling ruler of Panduranga, Po Saong Nyung Ceng, died in June 1822 while his vice king Po Klan Thu was in Huế with the court of Minh Mang, was waiting for an desired investiture.

In August 1822, Ja Lidong from Malathit (southwest of Phan Thiết) led a Cham uprising against Minh Mang's harsh mandatory levies and were advancing toward Bình Thuận, posing a threat to densely populated areas of Bình Thuận where the (Vietnamese) Kinh were majority residents. Furious with news of the rebellion, Po Klan Thu requested Minh Mang for help, and Minh Mang immediately approved. Po Klan Thu was enthroned shortly after as ruler of Champa but a "commissioner of Champa" from the eyes of the Vietnamese, still he wasn't able to restrain discontent among the Chams. After receiving the investiture, Po Klan Thu returned to Panduranga's capital Phan Rí, while Ja Lidong's forces had captured many regions and blown up a strategic fort in Thị Linh.

In February 1823, the Cham royal court assembled an army, assisted by Kinh militia under the command of Thái Văn Thuận. From Long Hương, Phan Rí and Phú Hài, they began hunting down the rebels of Ja Lidong, engaged and defeated them. The army of Ja Lidong however did not disintegrate but retreated westward to the Mekong Delta, which was under the governance of the Viceroyalty of Saigon. The current viceroy of Saigon, Lê Văn Duyệt, sent envoy Nguyễn Văn Châu to meet Ja Lidong and made a compromise. After the deal has been facilitated, Ja Lidong agreed to surrender his arms and army peacefully to Lê Văn Duyệt.

== See also ==
- Nduai Kabait rebellion
- Katip Sumat uprising
- Ja Thak Wa uprising
- Principality of Thuận Thành
