= Gangaraja =

Gaṅgārāja
- King of Lâm Ấp
- Reign: 413–?
- Predecessor: Bhadravarman I
- Successor: Manorathavarman (Fàn Wéndí)
- Died: ?

Gangaraja was a king of early Champa. He was the founder of Gangaraja dynasty (often known as the Simhapura dynasty or the Gangeśvara).

Gangaraja was an intelligent and brave person, and was expected to ascend the throne of Champa. He ruled for a short time, then abdicated the throne and personally went on pilgrimage in Jahnavi (the Ganges River), Northeast India. Gangaraja viewed the Ganges gives birth to great joy. His long trip was the reason why the country then plundered into civil war. His successor was Manorathavarman (Fàn Wéndí), a nephew.

According to the Book of Liang and History of the Southern Dynasties, Fan Dizhen (Chinese: 范敌真; pinyin: Fàn Dízhēn, who was identified with Gangaraja by Georges Maspero) was the son of king Fan Huda. He went to the Ganges because he was getting guilt-ridden after he had exiled his mother and his maternal brother.

Preceded by Bhadravarman I 380–413	King of Champa; 413–?	Succeeded by Manorathavarman ?–?
