= Rudravarman I =

Rudravarman
- King of Campādeśa; King of Lâm Ấp (Bestowed by the Liang dynasty)
- Reign: 529–572
- Predecessor: Bicuibamo
- Successor: Sambhuvarman
- Died: 572
- Dynasty: Simhapura dynasty

Rudravarman I (r. 529–572 AD; Chinese: 高式 律陁羅跋摩; pinyin: Gāoshì Lütuóluóbámó, Early Middle Chinese: *lɔ-dɑ-lɑ-bɑt-mɑ) was a king of early Champa.

Rudravarman was a descendant of king Manorathavarman (Fàn Wéndí). His father was a brahman, while his mother was a niece of Manorathavarman. In 530 he was enfeoffed with titles king of Linyi (Linyi Wang 林邑王), Commissioner with Special Powers (Chijie 持節), Commander-in-Chief of all Military Affairs in the Coastal Region (Dudu Yanhai Zhujunshi 都督沿海諸軍事), General of Pacification of the South (Annan Jiangjun 安南將軍) by the Chinese Liang dynasty.

In 541 he invaded the Jiude/Cửu Đức (Chinese: 九徳; pinyin: Jiǔdé; today Hà Tĩnh) province. Pham Tu, a general of Ly Bon, defeated Rudravarman in 544. Michael Vickery speculates that Pham Tu might be a Linyi subject who then fled north and joined with Ly Bon.

He is mentioned in inscription C. 73 at My Son.

| Preceded by Bicuibamo 526–529? | King of Champa; 529–572 | Succeeded by Sambhuvarman 572–629 |
