= Phạm Dương Mại II =

Fan Yang Mai II or Pham Duong Mai II was the King of Champa, an area populated by the Cham ethnic group in present-day Vietnam, from 421 to about 446. In 431, the King was denied the aid of the King of Funan during a war with the Chinese governor of Jiaozhou. In 433, Fan Yang Mai II, after being denied this territory, turned against the Khmers and annexed the Khmer district of Panduranga.

Fan Yan Mah II continued the practice of pirating the coasts of Nhat-nam and Cu'u-cho'n, and attacking Giao-chi. This prompted successive Chinese governors of Kiao-chu to send punitive expeditions against Champa in 431 and 446. This last expedition was led by the Chinese marshals Tan Ho-chen, Song Kio and Siao King-hien. When Kiu Sou fell, "Blood flooded the palace halls, and bodies piled up in heaps..." Then Song Kio used paper lions to frighten the Champ elephants at the "Stupa of Demons" near Banh-long Bay. Finally, Champapura was looted, and "the whole country was occupied."

In 446 the governor of Tongking undertook strong repressive measure against Champa. A battle delivered to him the capital. The king died brokenhearted.

Preceded by Fan Yang Mai I 420–421	King of Champa; 421–446	Succeeded by Fan Shen Cheng; 446–484
