= Liên Hương =

Liên Hương Xã Liên Hương
- Commune
- Liên Hương commune
- Interactive map of Liên Hương
- Coordinates: 11°13′26″N 108°43′49″E
- Country: Vietnam
- Region: South Central Coast
- Province: Lâm Đồng
- Time zone: UTC+7 (UTC + 7)

Liên Hương is a commune (xã) of Lâm Đồng Province, Vietnam.
