= Ja Thak Wa uprising =

Cham revolt in Vietnam (1834-1835)

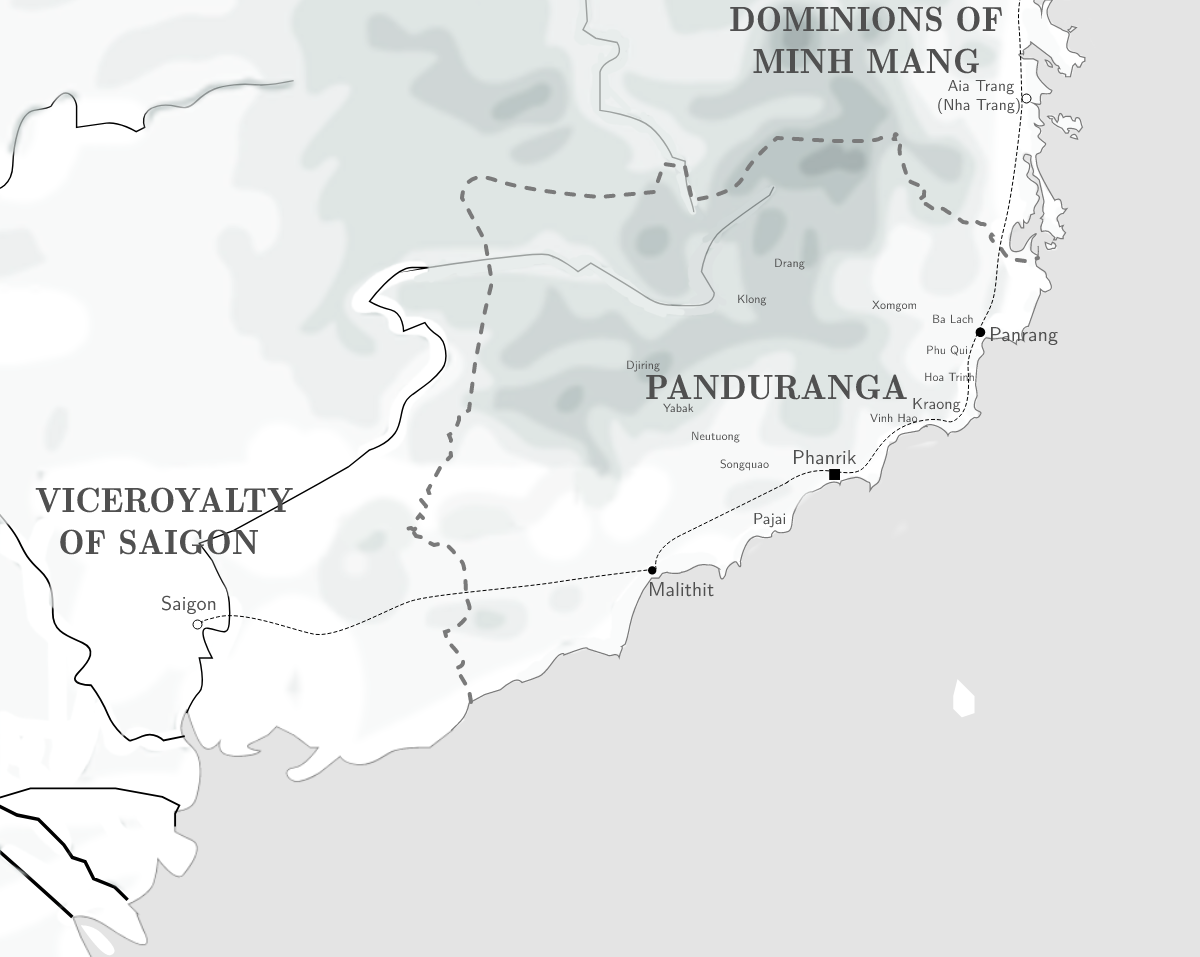
- Champa during the last decades (1790s-1832)
Date	September 1834 – July 1835
Location	Central Vietnam & Southern Vietnam
Result	Nguyễn dynasty victory

Belligerents
Champa	Nguyễn dynasty

Commanders and leaders
Ja Thak Wa †; Po War Palei †	Bùi Công Huyên; Lê Đức Tiệm

Strength
Unknown	Unknown

Ja Thak Wa uprising (Vietnamese: Khởi nghĩa Ja Thak Wa) was a revolt led by two ethnic Cham leaders, Ja Thak Wa and Po War Palei, against the Vietnamese government under Emperor Minh Mạng in 19th century southern Vietnam.

Northern Champa was conquered by the Dai Viet in 1471 but the Cham kept various forms of autonomy until 1832 (Panduranga and Principality of Thuận Thành). The Chams were forced to adopt Vietnamese customs.

After the Katip Sumat uprising was put down, Ja Thak Wa (Thầy Điền or Điền Sư), another Muslim cleric, launched another revolt against Vietnamese in 1834. Ja Thak Wa chose Chek Bicham (Phố Châm Sơn) as his base area; he crowned Po War Palei (La Bôn Vương), a brother-in-law of the last deputy ruler Po Dhar Kaok (Nguyễn Văn Nguyên), as the new Champa king. The rebels attacked Ninh Thuận, Bình Thuận, Khánh Hòa and Phú Yên. They were supported by Montagnard in Central Highlands.

The rebellion was put down in July 1835, though both Ja Thak Wa and Po War Palei were killed in Phan Rang earlier in May. In the same year, two Cham leaders, Po Phaok The (Nguyễn Văn Thừa) and Po Dhar Kaok (Nguyễn Văn Nguyên) were executed by the Emperor.

== Origin of Ja Thak Wa ==
Ja Thak Wa, a Cham religious leader from Văn Lâm village, Ninh Thuận, originally a distinguished leader of Sumat's uprising, refrained from following Khaṭīb Sumat's prophecies after having a dispute with the khatib about motivation and planning. (Note: CM [Cham Manuscript] 24 (5), pp. 168-169) Sumat's uprising quickly fell apart due to the same reason. Ja Thak Wa criticized Sumat for his fanatical Islamic extremism and sycophant behaviors. He splintered his band from Sumat in late 1833 to the western mountains (Central Highlands). Ja Thak Wa was a moderate Bani dignitary and his movement in chiaroscuro was not motivated by Islamism. (Note: CM 23, pp. 167-168. (Po 2013, p. 146)) His desires were restoring an independent state of Champa with multiethnic and multicultural harmonies from Vietnamese rules, urging the Cham natives to revolt and drive Vietnamese settlers out of Champa.

== First phase of the revolution ==
In August 1834, Ja Thak Wa's forces began the first uprising by organizing attacks on Vietnamese military garrisons in coastal Bình Thuan and rallied people to revolt. (Note: DNTLCB, XVI, p. 71) An account calls his forlorn homeland quaked and awakened by resentful "holy fire" (Apuei Kadhir). But the Cham leadership in the lowland were too afraid if they denounced the Vietnamese and joined the rebellion against Minh Mang. (Note: CAM 1, p. 3)

In October, the insurrection entered its second offensive, hailing from the mountains to the lowland. (Note: CAM 30 (17), pp. 50-51) Ja Thak Wa believed 'the revolution could only succeed if it gained fully passionate commitment and support from the lowland mass,' the rebels forced people to reach affidavits by launching a terror campaign, mass killing of disloyal Cham and Kinh settlers, especially those who allied with the king Po Phaok The. (Note: CM 29, stanza 20. (Po 2013, p. 153)) (Note: MMCY [Minh Mệnh chính yếu, Daily reports to Minh Mang], V, p. 180. (Po 2013, p. 153)) The Vietnamese daily chronicles of Minh Mang claims that the rebels had committed great slaughters against lowland Chams as well as Kinh settlers.

== Establishment of a New state of Champa ==
In late 1834, the revolution's headquarters (located in the Central Highlands east of Khanh Hoa province) were put under a newly established provisional assembly, an aggregate made up of an anti-Vietnamese coalition of the suffered, namely Cham Bani and Cham Balamons, the highlanders,... (Note: DNTLCB (Đại Nam thực lục chính biên), XVI, pp. 118-119) The assembly's plebiscite then elected Po War Palei, Cei Dhar Kaok's brother-in-law, a descendant of king Po Rome's dynasty, and being a person of Raglai background from Cadang village, as king of New Champa. The assembly then anointed a Churu leader to Yang Aia Harei (Prince of the Sun) and Ja Yok Ai, a Cham leader, as the military commander. Notably, many prolific members of the high royal family of Panduranga also joined the resistance. The assembly's panel also arbitrated hostilities between Balamon and Bani communities. These actions, historian Po Dharma commented, an emphasis that manifests the polyethnic, antiracist, and democratic intentions of Ja Thak Wa's independence movement.

Accordingly, Ja Thak Wa believed that the proclamation of the Champa provisional assembly would eventually drive the movement to the ultimate and inevitable goal – the liberation of Champa as an independent, sovereign state.

== Vietnamese reactions ==
Upon learning news of the uprising, Minh Mang was furious as he complained about Ja Thak Wa's movement "anti-Viet idiotic and barbarous highlands led by traitorous and disobedient mobs." (Note: DNTLCB, XVI, p. 84. (Po 2013, p. 149)) He ordered troops in the provinces to put down the rebellion.

Vietnamese military force, numbering around one thousand stationary troops supported by Kinh militia, established a naval blockade around coastal Ninh Thuan-Binh Thuan, then moved troops into villages to dislodge the rebels and set up interdiction efforts against rebels' logistics.

The Vietnamese court initially underestimated rebels and waged conventional warfare against them but could not match both popular uprisings and guerrilla fighters. Ja Thak Wa organized his army into small, mobile bands of guerilla fighters.

Situations in Panduranga quickly submerged into horror. Violence and terrorism escalated. The Vietnamese military deployed terrorist tactics to cut down supplies, such as burning down Cham villages and farmlands, blazing a trail of destruction, and carrying out considerable violent abuses against innocent civilians, intimidating the Cham population support and probable involvement for the insurgency of Ja Thak Wa.

== Initial Vietnamese defeats, revolutionary expansion ==
By early 1835, the Nguyen army had been driven out after being outflanked by rebels and losing battles at key towns of An Phước, Hòa Ða, Tuy Tịnh districts, and the Bình Thuận governance fell to the revolutionaries. Ja Thak Wa obtained control over old Panduranga. (Note: DNTLCB, XVI, p. 77. (Po 2013, p. 155))

Ja Thak Wa's reviving Champa then quickly expanded unprecedentedly, gaining control over a vast area in Central Vietnam, stretching from Phú Yên, Khánh Hòa, Ninh Thuận, Bình Thuận, Di Linh, Đồng Nai, and Lâm Đồng.

The revolt's success jeopardized the stance of the Nguyen court and destabilized the Vietnamese empire. The Lê Văn Khôi revolt at Saigon had not yet been pacified. The Siamese were agitating anti-Minh Mang rebellions in northern Vietnam while conducting raids in Cambodia, Vietnam's newly annexed territory.

== Vietnamese offensives (March 1835) and atrocities ==
Upon learning of his territorial losses to the Cham rebels, Minh Mang dispatched a reinforcement of 3,000 royal troops forward to the old Thuan Thanh to return his grips over Panduranga and put down the revolution. (Note: CM 29, stanza 43) (Note: DNTLCB, XVI, pp. 69, 129-143. (Po 2013, p. 153)) He fired several local officials that were blamed for having mismanaged and procrastinated suppression of the revolt. (Note: DNTLCB, XVI, pp. 78-79)

In March 1835, Minh Mang promised good remittances for soldiers who killed and beheaded a rebel to liquidate the revolt. Subsequently, what happened in Old Panduranga was a bloody reign of terror, systematic mass killings against armless Cham and indigenous civilians undertaken by Vietnamese soldiers and Kinh militia at a terrified 'genocidal level', by using abhorrent methods such as slow slicing or rampant mass killings with dead, mutilated bodies littered all over the area, and all those Vietnamese war crimes were well witnessed in both Vietnamese royal documents and Cham sources. (Note: DNTLCB, XVI, p. 79. (Po 2013, p. 155)) The same notorious method Minh Mang had employed in suppressing many previous rebellions and Christian revolts, however, quickly went out of control and turned into an ethnocide in Champa. Contemporary local hand accounts also noticed the ground zero: "Hue awards each soldier money and award for collecting three Cham heads every morning." Unstoppable, Vietnamese royal troops and Kinh paramilitary units were competing at hunting down and murdering innocent Cham civilians to receive task prizes. (Note: CM 29, stanza 29. (Po 2013, p. 155))

On the other hand, Minh Mang ordered his troops to destroy salt and rice storage houses to prevent Ja Thak Wa's troops from resupplying and brought war elephants to battle the rebels who did not have firearms to counter the elephant charge. (Note: DNTLCB, XVI, p. 79)

Facing brutal Cham defiance, Minh Mang then was intrigued into deliberation about asking Trương Minh Giảng, the current in-office governor-general of Cambodia, to govern Panduranga in disguise. (Note: DNTLCB, XVI, p. 94) Then he expected a hiatus by retracting his agenda and bribing the Cham aristocrats who have been adverse from the beginning to sabotage the revolution's core supporters. His administration granted amnesty to the former king Po Phaok The and the sister of the vice king Cei Dhar Kaok. He dismissed the killing competition he previously ordered by himself and demanded punishment for troops and corrupted officials who abused and killed unarmed civilians. (Note: DNTLCB, XVI, pp. 69, 82) He exonerated some 200 Cham prisoners in April while launching a disinformation campaign against Ja Thak Wa. (Note: DNTLCB, XVI, p. 129. (Po 2013, p. 157))

== Ending of the Champa resistance and aftermath ==
A blow struck the leadership of Neo Champa in the summer of 1835. The Raglai king Po War Palei was killed in action while battling against Nguyen troops in May 1835. (Note: DNTLCB, XVI, p. 198) Ja Thak Wa was wounded in Hamu Linang hamlet, near Phan Rang, was then captured by the Vietnamese, and he was sentenced to the death penalty. (Note: CAM 30, XVII, p. 51)

The revolutionaries still fiercely resisted until July in a futile hope of warding off the Vietnamese but soon succumbed and surrendered. (Note: MMCY, V, p. 181) Many revolutionaries and people involved in the uprising were immediately executed after their surrender, and some others were sent to exile or (slave) labor camps. (Note: CHCPI CAM 1, p. 8)

In July 1835, Minh Mang ordered the executions of the former king Po Phaok The and the vice king Cei Dhar Kaok, reportedly being accused of inspiring Le Van Khoi's a plot against the court, (Note: QTCB [Quốc triều chánh biên], p. 198) (Note: DNNTC (Đại Nam nhất thống chí), XII, p. 43) by slow-slicing. (Note: QTCB, p. 196) (Note: DNTLCB, XVI, p. 279)

In the summer of 1835, Minh Mang issued the destruction of Champa to release his anger. Historic sites were not exempted from the destruction. Cham cemeteries and royal tombs were smashed and vandalized. Temples were demolished. The temple of the king Po Rome was lit on fire. (Note: CAM 30 (17), pp. 49-53) Most Cham villages and towns, especially aquatic villages along the coast, had been razed and annihilated. Around seven to twelve Cham villages were scrambled to the ground. A Cham document recounts: "If you go along the coast from Panrang to Parik, you will see, Prince and Lord, that there are no more Cham houses (on the coast)." Consequently, the Cham had lost their ancestors' seafaring and shipbuilding traditions.

After Ja Thak Wa, Vietnamese royal documents also recorded one more uprising in the former Panduranga, led by two Cham sisters, Thị Tiết and Thị Cân Oa, in 1836. (Note: MMCY, VI, pp. 160-161. (Weber 2012, p. 165))

After all, to prevent further Cham resistance, Minh Mang decided to displace the Cham population and scatter them interleaved next to Kinh villages while shutting off communication between lowlander Cham and highlander tribes. (Note: DNTLCB, XVI, p. 289. (Weber 2012, p. 165)) Cham religious life and customs were practically wiped out. Indigenous highland peoples, their livelihoods, and their tracks were kept under heavy surveillance.

Ming Mang's successors Thieu Tri and Tu Duc reverted most of their grandfather's harsh policies on religion and ethnic assimilation, and the Cham was reallowed to practice their faiths.

Nevertheless, it was until when the French acquisition of Vietnam and later Indochina in the late 1880s had been finished only a tiny fraction, 40,000 Cham people in the old Panduranga remained. The French colonial administration prohibited Kinh discrimination and prejudice against Cham and indigenous highland peoples, putting an end to Vietnamese cultural genocide of the Cham.

== See also ==
- Ja Lidong rebellion
- Nduai Kabait rebellion
- Lê Văn Khôi revolt
- Katip Sumat uprising
- History of the Cham–Vietnamese wars

== Sources ==
- Bruckmayr, Philipp (2019). Cambodia's Muslims and the Malay World: Malay Language, Jawi Script, and Islamic Factionalism from the 19th Century to the Present. Brill Publishers. ISBN 978-9-00438-451-4.
- Lafont, Pierre-Bernard (2007). Le Campā: Géographie, population, histoire. Indes savantes. ISBN 978-2-84654-162-6.
- Po, Dharma (2013). Le Panduranga (Campa). Ses rapports avec le Vietnam (1802-1835). International Office of Champa.
- Weber, Nicolas (2012). "The destruction and assimilation of Campā (1832–35) as seen from Cam sources". Journal of Southeast Asian Studies. 43 (1): 158–180. doi:10.1017/S0022463411000701. S2CID 154818297.
- Weber, Nicholas (2016), "The Cham Diaspora in Southeast Asia: Patterns of Historical, Political, Social and Economic Development", in Engelbert, Jörg Thomas (ed.), Vietnam's Ethnic and Religious Minorities: A Historical Perspective, Peter Lang Edition, pp. 157–202, doi:10.3726/978-3-653-05334-0, ISBN 978-3-63166-042-3
