= Manorathavarman =

- King of Campādeśa
- Reign: c. 5th-century
- Predecessor: Gangaraja
- Successor: ?
- Died: ?
- Dynasty: Simhapura dynasty

Manorathavarman was a king of early Champa, reigning approximately around the fifth century AD in the Thu Bồn River Valley.

He was a nephew of Gangaraja. His next successor in the dynastic line was Rudravarman I (r. 527-572), descending through Manorathavarman's sister line.

He was mentioned by Chinese annals as Fan Wendi (Chinese: 范文敌, pinyin: Fàn Wéndí).

Preceded by Gangaraja 413–?	King of Champa ?–?	Succeeded by unknown ?–?
