= Po Saktiraydapatih =

- King of Champa; King of Thuận Thành Principality

King of Champa
- Reign: 1695–1728
- Predecessor: Po Saut
- Successor: Po Ganuhpatih
- Born: ? Champa
- Died: 1728; Băl Canar, Panduranga, Champa (in present-day Phan Rí Cửa, Tuy Phong District, Bình Thuận Province, Vietnam)
Names
- Po Saktiraydapatih
Regnal name
- Thuận Thành trấn vương (順城鎮王)
- Father: Po Saktiraydapaghoh
- Mother: Po Mul

Po Saktiraydapatih (?–1728), also spelled Po Saktiray Depatih, Po Saktiray Da Patih or Po Saktiraydaputih, was the king of Champa who ruled from 1695 to 1728. In Vietnamese records, he was mentioned as Kế Bà Tử (繼婆子).

== Biography ==
Po Saktiraydapatih was a younger brother of Po Saut. In 1692, Po Saut revolted against the Vietnamese Nguyễn lord and was captured in the following year. Champa was annexed by Vietnam and became the Vietnamese division Bình Thuận phủ (平順府, present-day Bình Thuận and Ninh Thuận); Po Saktiraydapatih was appointed the governor of Bình Thuận with the title khám lý (勘理).

Chams were ordered to wear Vietnamese-style clothes and forced to adopt Vietnamese customs. In 1693, a Cham aristocrat, Oknha Dat (Ốc nha Thát, 屋牙撻), revolted against Nguyễn lord. He obtained the help of a Chinese immigrant, A Ban (阿班).

Though the rebellion was put down, Nguyễn Phúc Chu decided to restore Champa Kingdom because there was an outbreak of plague in Panduranga. In 1694, Po Saktiraydapatih was crowned Champa king by the Nguyễn lord with the title Thuận Thành trấn vương (順城鎮王, "king of Thuận Thành trấn"), though he had no authority over Vietnamese living in the area. The king's palace was situated at Băl Canar, not far from Phan Rí. The king had a company of Vietnamese soldiers, 30 men in total, for his personal protection.

In 1712, Po Saktiraydapatih obtained "five-point treaty" (Ngũ điều Nghị định) with Vietnamese. The treaty, at least in theory, remained in effect until the abolition of Cham "aboriginal kingship" in 1832.

Po Saktiraydapatih developed a close relationship with Nguyễn lord until his death in 1728. After his death, an anti-Vietnamese rebellion occurred, but was swiftly defeated. However, members of his family were allowed to succeed him for several generations.

Preceded by Po Saut 1659–1692	Champa rulers 1695–1728	Succeeded by Po Ganuhpatih 1728–1730
