= Hải Ninh, Lâm Đồng =

Hải Ninh Xã Hải Ninh
- Rural commune
- Hải Ninh commune
- Interactive map of Hải Ninh
- Coordinates: 11°15′2″N 108°30′16″E
- Country: Vietnam
- Region: Southeast
- Province: Lâm Đồng
- Time zone: UTC+7 (UTC + 7)

Hải Ninh is a rural commune of Lâm Đồng Province in South Central Coast Vietnam.
