= Tuy Phong district =

Coordinates: 11.417°N 108.667°E

Tuy Phong district Huyện Tuy Phong
- District
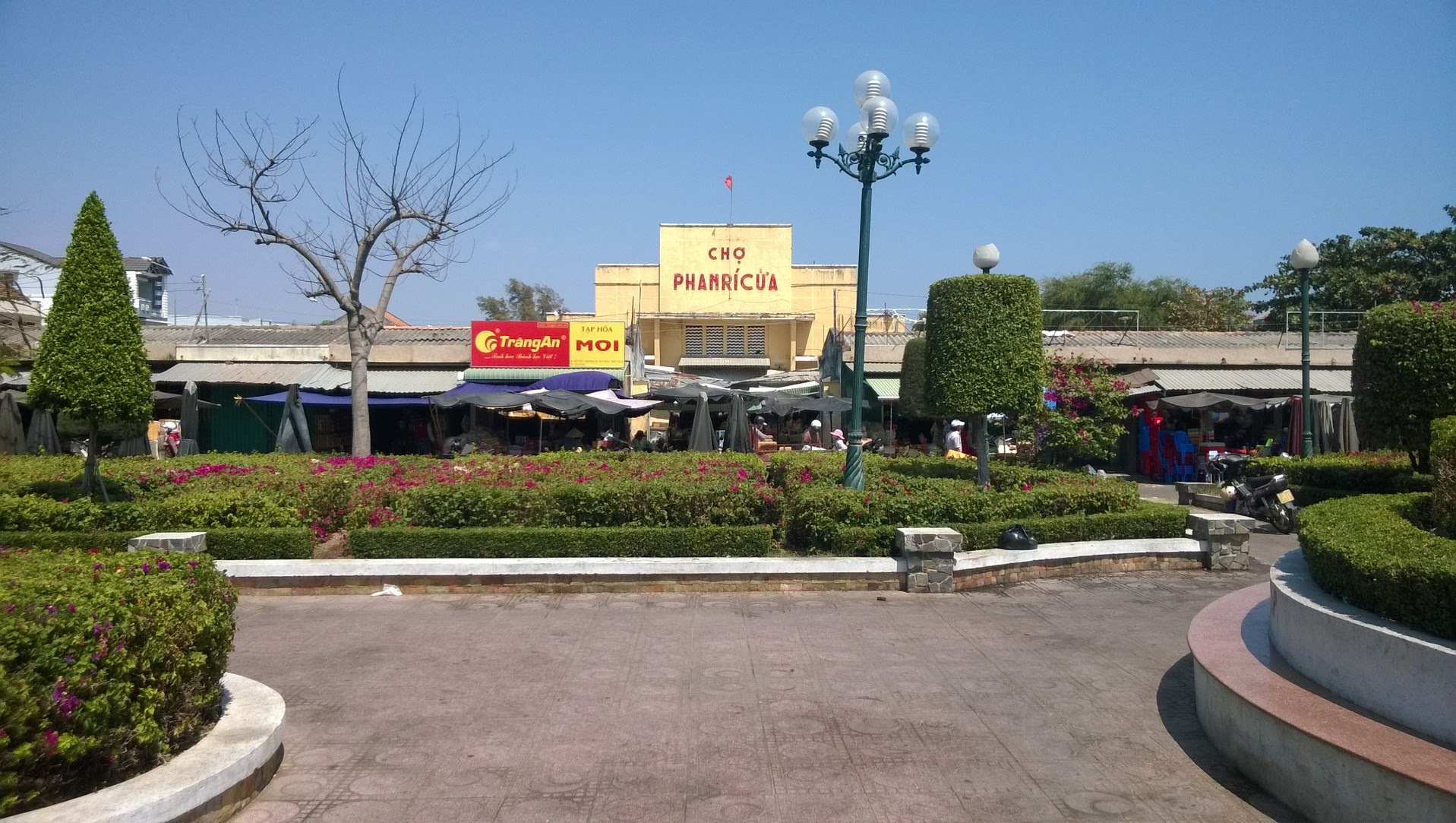
- In front of Phan Rí Cửa market

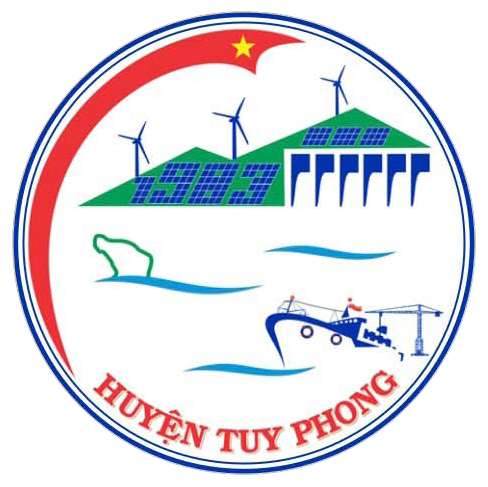
- Seal
- Interactive map of Tuy Phong district
- Country: Vietnam
- Region: South East
- Province: Bình Thuận
- Capital: Liên Hương

Area
  - Total: 292 sq mi (755 km^{2})

Population (2019 census)
  - Total: 144,800
  - Density: 497/sq mi (192/km^{2})
- Time zone: UTC+7 (Indochina Time)

Tuy Phong is a former rural district of Bình Thuận province in the Southeast region of Vietnam. As of 2019, the district had a population of 144,800. The district covers an area of 755 km^{2} (292 sq mi). The district capital lies at Liên Hương.

== History ==
In the early 17th century, due to the prolonged Trinh-Nguyen war, people from the Dang Ngoai provinces moved to the coastal land north of Binh Thuan to settle down. However, the place name Tuy Phong may have only officially existed since the 13th year of Minh Mang (1827) when Ninh Thuan province was established, including the two districts of Yen Phuoc and Tuy Phong (separated from Ham Thuan prefecture).

During the reign of King Dong Khanh the 4th (1886), Dao Ninh Thuan was changed to Khanh Hoa province, but Tuy Phong district still belonged to Binh Thuan (According to Dai Nam Nhat Thong Chi).

After 1975, Tuy Phong, together with the old districts of the Republic of Vietnam such as Hai Ninh, Phan Ly Cham, and Hoa Da, merged into Bac Binh district (belonging to the old Thuan Hai province).

In 1982, Tuy Phong district was re-established, separated from Bac Binh district. The district at that time still belonged to Thuan Hai province, including Phan Ri Cua and 10 communes: Binh Thanh, Chi Cong, Hoa Minh, Hoa Phu, Lien Huong, Phan Dung, Phong Phu, Phu Lac, Phuoc The, and Vinh Hao. However, Phan Ri Cua is not the district town of Tuy Phong district, the district administrative center is located in Lien Huong commune.

On November 28, 1983, Lien Huong commune was converted into Lien Huong town (district town of Tuy Phong district).

On December 26, 1991, Binh Thuan province was re-established from the old Thuan Hai province, Tuy Phong district belonged to Binh Thuan province.

On July 18, 2003, Vinh Hao commune was divided into two communes: Vinh Hao and Vinh Tan.

On December 16, 2011, Phan Ri Cua town was recognized as a type IV urban area.

On January 1, 2020, Hoa Phu commune was merged into Phan Ri Cua town.

Tuy Phong district has 2 towns and 9 communes as of 2024.
