= Phan Rí Cửa =

Phan Rí Cửa Xã Phan Rí Cửa
- Commune
- Phan Rí Cửa commune
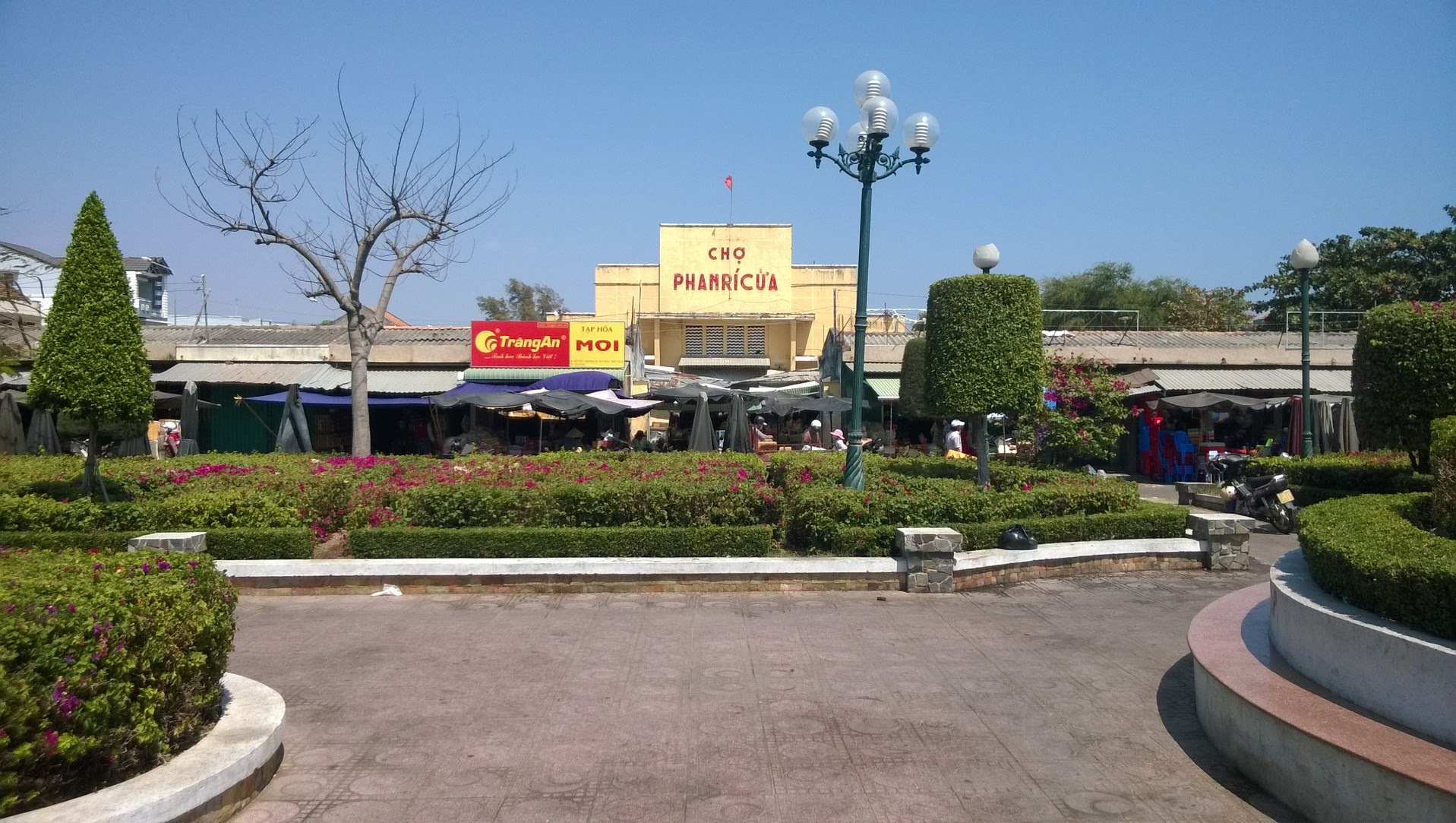

- Location within Vietnam
- Coordinates: 11°10′26″N 108°33′58″E
- Country: Vietnam
- Region: Southeast
- Province: Lâm Đồng

Area
  - Total: 5.77 sq mi (14.94 km^{2})

Population (2018)
  - Total: 45,805
  - Density: 7,940/sq mi (3,066/km^{2})
- Time zone: UTC+7 (UTC + 7)

Phan Rí Cửa is a commune of Lâm Đồng Province.

== Etymology ==
The name Phan Rí is a Vietnamese transliteration of the Cham word Panrik; while Cửa is a Vietnamese word that, in this context, means 'port'.

== History ==
Phan Rí Cửa was the capital of Principality of Thuận Thành in the past.

After 1975, Phan Ri Cửa was a commune of Bắc Bình district. On March 13, 1979, Vietnamese government upgraded Phan Rí Cửa commune into Phan Ri Cửa township.

On December 30, 1982, Bắc Binh district was divided into two districts, Bắc Bình and Tuy Phong, Phan Ri Cửa township belonged to Tuy Phong district.

On December 16, 2011, the Ministry of Construction recognized Phan Ri Cửa township as a Class-4 urban area. On November 21, 2019, the township annexed the rural commune of Hòa Phú.
