= Champa–Đại Việt War (1367–1390) =

14th-century regional conflict in Indochina

Champa–Đại Việt war (1367–1390)
- Part of the Cham–Vietnamese wars
- Map of the Mainland Southeast Asia by 1400 AD
Date	1367–1390
Location	Red River Delta, Central Vietnam, Laos, Gulf of Tonkin
Territorial changes	Champa defensive victory Vietnamese invasion failed: Status quo ante bellum as no territorial changes; Both states severely weakened

Belligerents
Champa	Đại Việt

Commanders and leaders
Po Binasuor †; La Khai; Trần Húc	Trần Nghệ Tông; Trần Duệ Tông †; Đỗ Tử Bình; Đỗ Lễ †; Nguyễn Lạp Hòa †; Phạm Huyền Linh †; Trần Húc (surrendered); Lê Quý Ly

Casualties and losses
Very heavy	Very heavy

The Champa–Đại Việt War (1367–1390) was a costly military confrontation fought between the Đại Việt kingdom under the ruling Trần dynasty and the kingdom of Champa led by the King of Chế Bồng Nga (r. 1360 – 1390) in the late 14th century, from 1367 to 1390. By 1330s, Đại Việt and Khmer Empire (a historic rival of Champa) both felt into swiftly declining due to climate changes, population expansion, widespread bubonic plague, famines and many other factions, which contributed to Champa's resurgence of the 14th century. In 1360, Chế Bồng Nga, son of king Chế A Nan was enthroned as king of Champa, reunited the Chams under his banner, and in 1367 he demanded Trần Dụ Tông the return of two former provinces Ô and Lý, now Quảng Trị and Thừa Thiên Huế) to Champa. Declined to this demand, Trần Dụ Tông sent an army to strike Champa but was repulsed.

In 1369, the crown of Đại Việt went to Dương Nhật Lễ, a man not from the Trần dynasty, which then triggered a short and deadly succession war in the capital. Dương Nhật Lễ was deposed and executed in the next year as the Trần family regained the mandate. Nhật Lễ's mother fled to Champa. Seeking revenge against the Trần family, she recommended to Chế Bồng Nga to launch an invasion of Đại Việt. In 1371 he led a fleet through the Gulf of Tonkin assaulted into the Viet capital Thăng Long (now Hanoi) and sacked the city, and repeated three more times in 1378 and 1383. In 1377 he killed emperor Trần Duệ Tông (r. 1373–1377) at the Battle of Vijaya, and rapidly extended his Champa Empire into the Red River Delta, threatening Đại Việt's existence and its ruling dynasty.

It was also the first time in Indochina gunpowder weapons and lethal firearms from Ming China were introduced into warfare, which determined the decisive victory for the Vietnamese force over Cham force in the battle of Luộc River where Chế Bồng Nga was killed in 1390 by firearms of Vietnamese Prince Trần Khát Chân that effectively stopped the Cham advance. By the end of the war, both states had exhausted their human and material resources and achieved very little while having sustained massive destruction. The Trần dynasty lost power in 1400 to Hồ Quý Ly, the prominent chief minister who promoted a series of reforms.

== Background ==
The mutual struggle against the Mongol Yuan dynasty in the 13th century brought Đại Việt and Champa, formerly hostile states, close together. In 1306, Đại Việt retired emperor Trần Nhân Tông (r. 1278–1293) married off his daughter, Princess Huyen Tran (Queen Paramecvari), to king Chế Mân (Note: Che Man is often identified with Jaya Simhavarman III ciy Harijit, who has commanded the resistance against Yuan invasion.) (r. 1288–1307) of Champa as a confirmation of their alliance. Chế Mân ceded two provinces of Ô and Lý (Note: Vvyar and Ulik, present-day Quảng Trị and Thừa Thiên Huế.) to Đại Việt as the wedding gift. However Chế Mân soon died in the next year and Paramecvari refusal to die with her husband was considered a national disgrace to Champa. In response to this, Chế Mân's son, Chế Chí (Note: identified by Maspero as Jaya Simhavarman IV.) (r. 1307–1312), set out to recapture two districts ceded by Champa to Đại Việt. He was defeated and died a prisoner in Đại Việt. His brother Simhavarman V or Chế Năng (r. 1312–1318), son of the Yavadvipa (Javanese) Queen Tapasi become a vassal of emperorTrần Anh Tông (r. 1293–1314). Chế Năng rebelled in 1318, but was defeated by Trần Minh Tông (r. 1314–1329, son of Trần Anh Tông) and was forced to go into exile in Java. Champa was taken over by the Vietnamese for the next eight years.

Dai Viet went to conflict against Sukhothai in 1313, followed by Nguu Hong and Ai Lao in 1320s and 1330s. No inscription is known in Champa dating from 1307 to 1401, suggests a long decline of Indic Champa in the 14th century. T led by Chế A Nan won back independence in 1326. In 1342, Chế Mô, a royal member of the Cham court defected to the court of Trần Dụ Tông (r. 1341–1369) due to a succession dispute with his brother-in-law Trà Hòa Bố Để (r. 1342–1360), asking the Trần for an intervention. According to the Toàn Thư, in 1352 the Dai viet organized a naval assault on Champa, marching to Cổ Lũy (Quảng Ngãi), but failed when the Cham navy prevented them to link up with the supplies and were forced to turned back.

== Outbreak of war ==
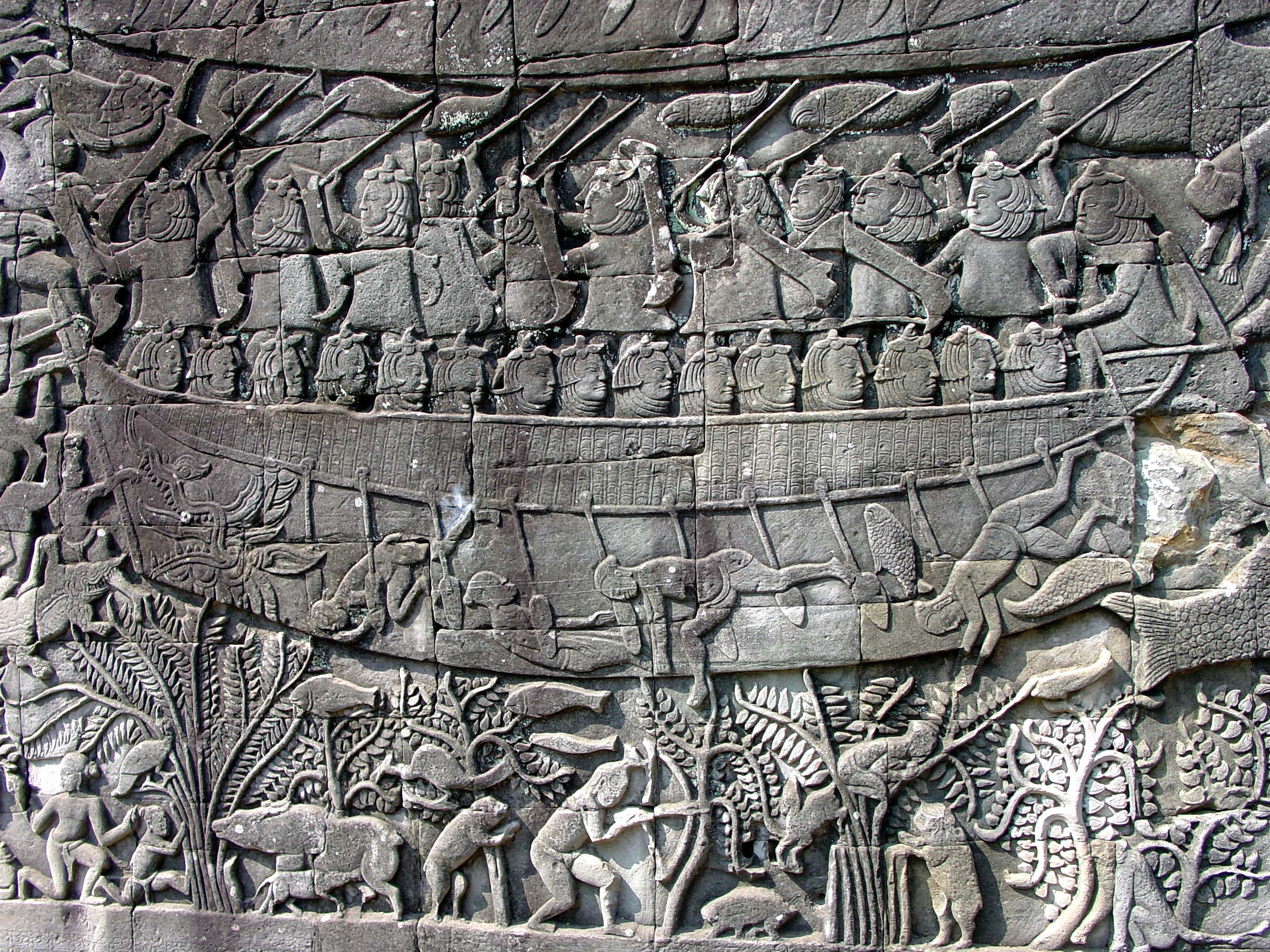
Depiction of a naval battle between the Cham and the Khmer on the Bayon relief

In the year of 1360 (1282 in Cham calendar), Chế Bồng Nga (Po Binasuor, Jaya R'čăm B'nga) or A-da-a-zhe (阿荅阿者) as reported in the Ming Shilu, the youngest son of king Chế A Nan, was crowned as King of Champa. In 1361, Champa raided Đại Việt's southern coast, plundering the Huế areas, its surrounding highlands and kidnapped local youth who gathered during holiday.

In 1368 Chế Bồng Nga sent envoys demanding Trần Dụ Tông the return of the two former provinces. The Trần king responded by sending an army attack into Indrapura (Note: Modern-day Quảng Nam), but was repulsed. These events kicked off the Champa-Dai Viet clashes that lasted for the next two decades. The Ming empire also played an important role during the beginning of the conflict. In 1361, Zhu Yuanzhang's envoy requested military support from the Vietnamese to fight the Mongols, but was refused. In 1369, the Ming established relations with both Champa and Đại Việt. Chế Bồng Nga quickly placed his kingdom in the favor of the new Hongwu Emperor as he dispatched the first embassy and sent tribute to the Ming court. Champa for a long time perhaps had a well-established connection with the Muslim trade and the Maritime Southeast Asian world, although the Majapahit considered the Vietnamese polity "highly respected as a very close ally."

== War ==
=== Sack of Hanoi in 1371 ===
Trần Dụ Tông was an incompetent and impotent ruler that he had no heir to succeed. He picked his brother's son Dương Nhật Lễ as the successor, although Nhật Lễ did not come from the royal family. In 1370, the Trần family launched a bloody coup that dethroned Dương Nhật Lễ. Prince Trần Phủ was crowned as Trần Nghệ Tông (r. 1370–1372). Nhật Lễ's Queen mother, however, fled to Champa and urged Chế Bồng Nga to attack the Trần for her revenge.

Chế Bồng Nga then massed a large fleet, heading north. The fleet sailed across the Gulf of Tonkin and struck southern Red River Delta in Spring 1371 while the Vietnamese had no organized army left in defense. Cham force sacked the Viet capital of Thăng Long (Note: Now Hanoi), set the city on fire, seized women, jewels, and silks. All Vietnamese books held in the royal palace were lost.

=== Battle of Vijaya and second sack of Hanoi in 1378 ===
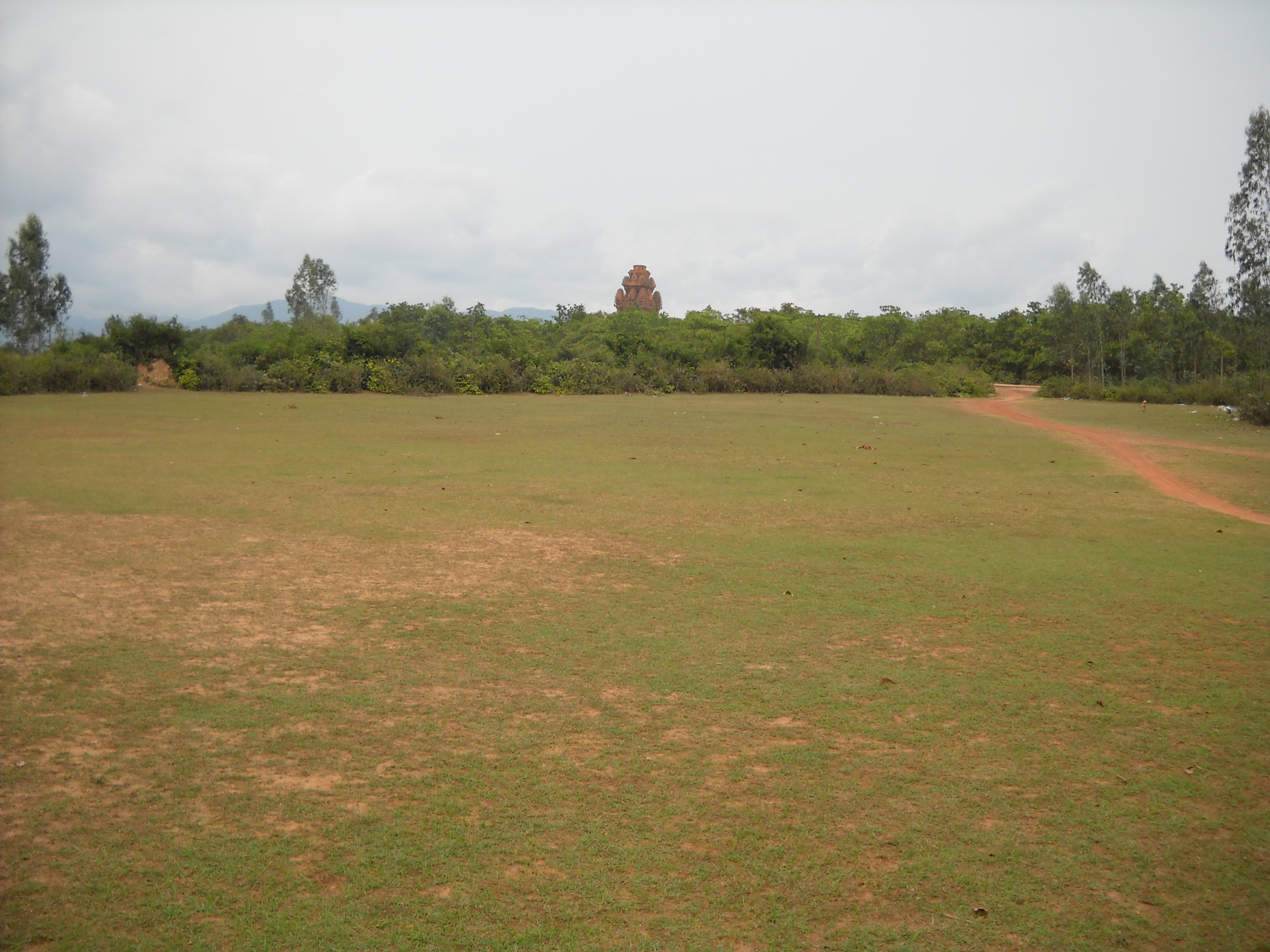
Cánh Tiên temple near Vijaya Citadel

In 1372 Trần Nghệ Tông crowned his younger brother Trần Kính as king Trần Duệ Tông (junior king) while himself served as the senior king. The Viet court then spent time to refortifying the ties with its southern mandalas of Thanh-Nghệ and securing the capital as reaction to the rising Champa of Chế Bồng Nga. In 1372 Chế Bồng Nga sent a letter to the Hongwu Emperor of China warned that the Viets were about to attack his country, demanded China for protection and war materials. In 1375 Hồ Quý Ly (c. 1335–1408), a leader from Thanh-Nghệ, through beneficial royal contacts of his relatives, received a high military rank of the army, became the prominent figure of Đại Việt late 14th-century along with his rival Đỗ Tử Bình (c. 1324–1381).

According to the Toàn thư, in 1376, Chế Bồng Nga launched incursions into Hoá Châu (Thừa Thiên Huế). King Trần Duệ Tông assembled a massive army of 120,000 men with support from Nghệ An, Quảng Bình and Thuận Hoá, ready for a counterattack. Hồ Quý Ly was responsible for transporting supplies and army from Nghệ An, Tân Bình and Thuận Hoá, while general Đỗ Tử Bình commanded the army. In early 1377, Champa initially tried to negotiate, but corruption in Vietnamese military leadership thwarted this effort. Trần Duệ Tông continued to march his army to Champa's capital Vijaya (Note: Near modern-day Qui Nhơn). Duệ Tông saw a deserted encampment, where one of Duệ Tông's officers had informed him that it could be a trap of Chế Bồng Nga. Duệ Tông ignored the officer and continued to advance forward into the Vijaya citadel, where Chế Bồng Nga and his army ambushed the Viet army. Southerners in the Viet army turned and defected to the Cham. Duệ Tông's army was smashed into an undisciplined mob while he and three generals were slain during the chaos. The Ming Shilu and later Jesuit histories also report a Trần king named Chen Tuan (陳煓) died in Champa in 1377 "after engaging in a major war."

Đỗ Tử Bình abandoned the position and fled north for his life. The Chams captured Trần Húc, a Vietnamese prince. Chế Bồng Nga married off his daughter to Húc, and put the Prince in charge of a Cham army attack into Nghệ An.

Following the death of the Viet king, Chế Bồng Nga's mighty Chams pursued the disarrayed Viet troops forward north, rapidly advanced into the Red River Delta, met little resistance, and sacked Hanoi in late 1377, gaining control of vast territories including Thanh Hoá and Nghệ An, marked the apex of the Cham Empire. In early 1378 the pro-Cham Prince Trần Húc appeared in Nghệ An, claiming to be king of Đại Việt. He and Chế Bồng Nga rallied with people from southern provinces under Cham occupation, together with Cham force overran Đỗ Tử Bình, besieged and took Hanoi for the third time, pillaged the city. They forced the king Trần Phế Đế to move royal treasures to Mount Thienkien and the Kha-lang Caves (Note: Near modern-day Hạ Long) in 1379. After the Cham retreated back to Thanh Hoá, Hồ Quý Ly reappeared on the frontline. To refill the empty treasure that was needed to train, equip, and supply soldiers, Quý Ly and a group of men increased the taxes per household and military manpower. Royal family owning lands were distributed equally per peasant to maximize the war effort, still the Viet resources were almost exhausted.

=== Fourth sack of Hanoi in 1383 ===
The army of Champa resumed raiding Thanh Hoá in 1380, but a joint force led by Hồ Quý Ly and Đỗ Tử Bình drove them off. The Cham retreated back to Quảng Bình, while Quý Ly's forces regained control of Nghệ An and executed a local leader who had sided with the Cham. In 1382 they attempted an assault on Thanh Hoá by both land and sea, but Nguyễn Đa Phương, a local general and a protégé of Quý Ly, held them back. In early 1383, Hồ Quý Ly tried to lead a naval fleet into Cham occupied territory, but a storm impeded his efforts.

That summer, Chế Bồng Nga launched a new northward offensive. With general La Khai's advice, he traveled the western route through mountains of eastern Laos and Thanh Hoá, bypassing Hồ Quý Ly's army. The Cham army approached Sơn Tây, west of the Viet capital Hanoi. Trần Nghệ Tông sent a general who tried to hold off the Cham advance, but he was defeated, which left the road to Hanoi wide open. Nghệ Tông fled to the north of the Red River and sought asylum at Bao Hoa Palace, while Chế Bồng Nga's soldiers once again ransacked the capital, occupying it for six months before departing.

== Truce ==
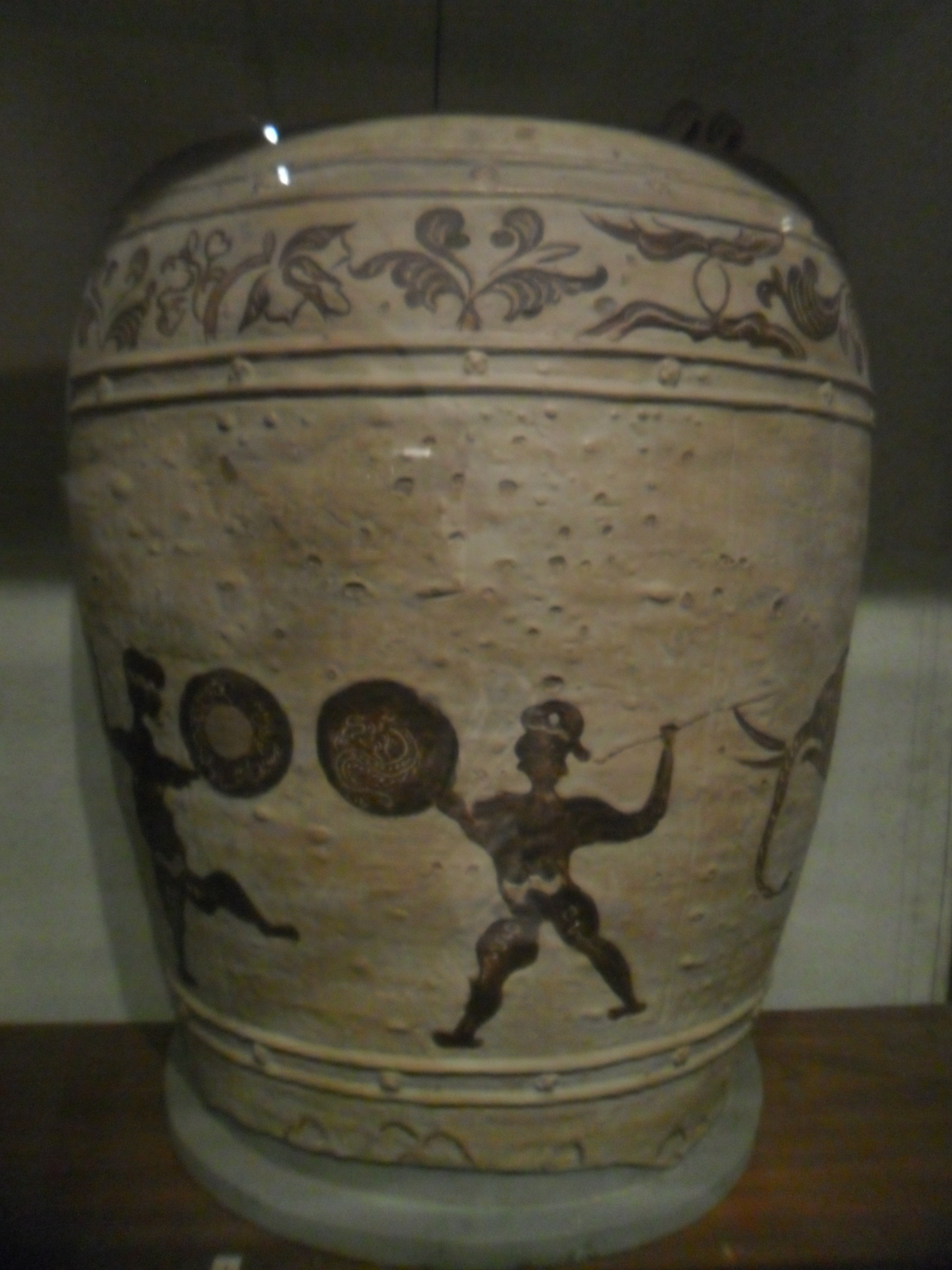
Relief renders two Viet warriors on a vase, 13-14th century. Pictograph by EFEO.

In 1387 Nghệ Tông returned to the capital and appointed Hồ Quý Ly as the chief minister. Rival faction in the court alleged against Quý Ly led the death of the reigning king Trần Phế Đế who joined a conspiracy to overthrow Hồ Quý Ly and other conspirators. Ten-year-old Prince Ngung was crowned as Trần Thuận Tông (r. 1388–1398). Quý Ly installed a group of scholars to the court who were loyal to him. In 1389, rebellion erupted in Thanh Hoá against Quý Ly, disturbances in Dai Viet that prompted a new Cham invasion. Chế Bồng Nga together with Nguyên Diệu, a prince who defected to the Cham, led a hundred warships advanced into Thanh Hoá, attempted to get rid of Đại Việt once and forever. In northwest of Hanoi, a Buddhist monk raised a rebellion against the Trần dynasty, forcing the Trần kings and royal members to escape to the north as rebels flooded into Hanoi. Nguyễn Đa Phương committed suicide.

The Viet army became fragmented and lost morale. A Trần prince, Trần Khát Chân, rallied his troops on Hải Triều River (Note: Modern-day Tiên Lữ District, Hưng Yên Province) in southern Red River Delta, to make a last stand in early 1390. A surrendered low-rank Cham officer helped the Vietnamese identify Chế Bồng Nga's flagship among several hundred. Trần Khát Chân ordered troops firing a volley of fire from handheld muskets concentrated at the Cham king's ship. Chế Bồng Nga was killed and the prince took his head as war booty. When Trần Nghệ Tông learned that Chế Bồng Nga was dead, he commented: 'Bông Nga and I have been confronting for long but we did not get to see each other until today. Isn't this like that Han Gaozu saw the head of Xiang Yu! [Now] the country is pacified."

The Ming Shilu provides another version of Chế Bồng Nga's death: La Khai (Simhavarman VI), the minister and general of Chế Bồng Nga, assassinated the Cham king in 1390, deposing the princes, then claiming himself king.

The Cham army collapsed. Cham general La Khai got his king's body back, cremating it and withdrew the army back to Vijaya, where he was proclaimed as Jaya Simhavarman V (r. 1390–1400) of a new dynasty while two Chế Bồng Nga's sons fled and took refuge in Đại Việt. The 23 years war eventually had ended in status quo ante.

== Aftermath ==
=== Devastation and dynastic change ===
The crisis and survival period of the late 14th century Đại Việt is proven deadly. War with Champa, internal rebellions, famines triggered by the war itself, democide, climate changes and disease, together combined decreased the Vietnamese population about 25% of total population (roughly 800,000 deaths, estimated by Yumio Sakurai based on excavation study on 14th century Red River Delta). With gunpowder, the Vietnamese had saved their state from the brink of dismantling. The Cham sacks of Hanoi also demoralized Dai Viet's aristocracy and Confucians, giving space to a new Confucian literati class, rivaling traditional Buddhist culture and aristocratic governance, which would dominate the Vietnamese court in the next century under the patron of Lê Thánh Tông. Hồ Quý Ly now was the most powerful figure in Đại Việt after the war. As the chief minister, he conducted a series of reforms without the king's approval, despite the country was in recovery from destruction. Quý Ly also had support from the old king Trần Nghệ Tông who trusted him to plant his reforms and gained control over the royal family. in January 1395 Nghệ Tông died. In 1398 Quý Ly manipulated king Trần Thuận Tông into abdicating, installed two-year-old Prince An as Trần Thiếu Đế (r. 1398–1400). In 1400 he deposed Thiếu Đế and proclaimed himself ruler, establishing his clan in royal positions, murdered Thuận Tông and suppressed the Trần aristocracy, dissents and families who allied with them.

In Champa, king Jaya Simhavarman VI abandoned most of his previous ruler's conquered lands. Champa gradually declined. Simhavarman V also failed to have recognition from the Ming. The Ming Emperor viewed La Khai as the usurper who assassinated Chế Bồng Nga, and refused to receive his tribute, along with Vietnamese tribute. La Khai was succeeded by his son Indravarman VI (r. 1400–1441), who would confront Hồ Quý Ly in the next brief border war.

=== Resuming conflicts (1401–1404) ===
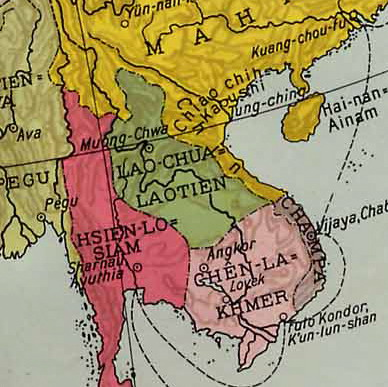
Mainland Southeast Asia in 1410s as Dai Viet was conquered by the Ming dynasty in 1407

In 1401 Hồ Quý Ly raised his second son Hồ Hán Thương (r.1401–1407) who has Trần bloodline as king and he became the senior king. Quý Ly immediately mobilized an army of 15,000 men to invade Champa in Amaravati (Note: Quang Ngai), but was forced to turn back due to floods. In 1402 Hồ Hán Thương and some former Cham generals launched several incursions into Amaravati, forcing Indravarman VI to ceded four regions Thăng, Hoa, Tư, and Nghĩa and Tân Ninh highlands to the Dai Ngu.

According to the Toàn thư, in a desire to "attack Champa and conquer all the land south to the border of Siam," Hán Thương provoked a new war with Champa in 1403. 200,000 troops, an obvious exaggerated and controversial number, led by Hán Thương laid an unsuccessful siege of Vijaya which lasted for nine months. In contrast, the Ming Shilu does not record a war in 1403 between Champa and Annam.

In 1403 Hán Thương sent an embassy to China. The Yongle Emperor demanded him to stop raiding Champa. In 1404 Hán Thương again raided Champa, prompting the Ming empire for action. A 1405 memorial from Champa king Indravarman VI attached in the Ming Shilu claimed that Hán Thương raided his country in mid-1404, occupying a place called Sa Ly Nha (沙離牙) and seizing the king's (Ming) ceremonial costume; the Ming demanded that Đại Việt ceasing hostility against Champa. For the entry of 1406, the Ming accused the Hồ for invading Jiuzhou (Amaravati) and raiding Ban-da-lang, stealing 100 elephants from Champa, which were used by the Hồ to attack Zhan-sha and Li-ya, apparently two states bordering Champa.

In 1406, in the banner of restoring the Trần dynasty, 215,000 Chinese troops ordered by Yongle invaded Dai Viet, arrested the Hồ kings, their family and turned Dai Viet kingdom into the empire's thirteenth province. Four former territories gained by Hồ Hán Thương were returned to Champa. Champa was visited by Zheng He's fleet several times. From 1418 to 1427 Vietnamese leader Lê Lợi launched a war of Independence that eventually drove the Chinese out of northern Vietnam and became king of restored Dai Viet in 1428. He established a good relation with Indravarman VI, both sent embassies and presents to each other. Lê Lợi's fourth grandson, the great king Lê Thánh Tông, however waged a war that decimated Champa in 1471.

=== Legacy ===
Chế Bồng Nga is remembered as the greatest hero of the Cham people and in Cham folklore. In Ede and Jrai language, he is memorialised as R'čăm B'nga (Anak Orang Cham Bunga, lit. The bright flower of the Cham people). During its peak, Chế Bồng Nga's empire could have extended from the Red River Delta to southeastern Laos, to former territories controlled by the Khmer Empire in south.

Cham influence can also be detected in stone pedestals found in various pagodas on both sides of the Red River. The pedestals have been dated to the second half of the fourteenth century; many bear dates from 1364 to 1394, the period of the Chế Bồng Nga's campaign against the Viets.

== Chronology ==
Time	Event
1368	Chế Bồng Nga demanded Đại Việt court the return of the two former provinces Ô and Lý. Trần Dụ Tông responded by attacking Champa, but was repulsed.
1369	Dương Nhật Lễ usurp the crown in Đại Việt.
1370	Dương Nhật Lễ was dethroned and executed by Trần princes; Nhật Lễ's mother fled to Champa and begged Chế Bồng Nga to attack Đại Việt for her revenge.
1371	Cham force sacked Hanoi.
1376	Chế Bồng Nga attacked Hoá Châu, Trần Duệ Tông massed 120,000 men to invade Champa.
1377	Battle of Vijaya: Chế Bồng Nga defeated and killed Duệ Tông. Cham troops pursued the surviving Viet soldiers; 2nd sack of Hanoi.
1378	The defected prince Trần Húc sponsored by Chế Bồng Nga, claimed to be king of Dai Viet; 3rd sack of Hanoi.
1379	Trần Phế Đế moved the state treasures to Mount Thienke and Kha Lang Caves.
1380	Cham raid in Thanh Hoá, but was drive off by Hồ Quý Ly. Cham forces withdraw to Quảng Bình.
1381	China threatened Trần Phế Đế for attacks on disputed Ming border territories; Phế Đế helped provision Ming troops fighting in Yunnan.
1382	Cham naval and land assault on Thanh Hoá, but was defeated by Nguyễn Đa Phương.
1383	Unsuccessful Vietnamese naval strike; Chế Bồng Nga launched a new offensive cut through the western mountains; Fourth sack of Hanoi.
1384	Cham troops pillaged Thanh Hoá.
1385	A fleet led by Hồ Quý Ly was forced to return due to typhoon; Chế Bồng Nga's general La Khai commanded the Cham army and attacked the Red River Delta, but was unable to take Hanoi.
1386	Chế Bồng Nga sent his son Po Pu Iyang Sivaraja head an embassy to the Chinese court.
1387	Trần Nghệ Tông appointed Hồ Quý Ly as the chief minister.
1388	A conspiracy against Hồ Quý Ly failed, Trần Phế Đế was dethroned and executed; a Chinese embassy crossed Dai Viet and demanded Champa 50 elephants.
1389	Rebellions against Hồ Quý Ly; Chế Bồng Nga launched a new northward campaign; rebels occupied Hanoi.
1390	Chế Bồng Nga was killed by Vietnamese prince Trần Khát Chân who used firearms at a naval battle on Hải Triều River; the Cham army collapsed; General La Khai withdraw to Champa and proclaimed Jaya Simhavarman V; war ended.

== See also ==
- Khmer–Cham wars
- Forty Years' War
- Ming conquest of Yunnan
