= History of the Cham–Vietnamese wars =

Wars between Vietnam and Champa

The Cham–Vietnamese Wars were a series of wars and conflicts between various Vietnamese dynasties and of Champa that led to a total annexation of Champa by the Vietnamese, starting with the 10th-century wars between the two states, and ended with recent 20th-century ethnic conflicts. These wars are considered principal parts of the Vietnamese's supposed Nam tiến (March to the South) theory.

== History ==
=== Beginning of the conflict ===
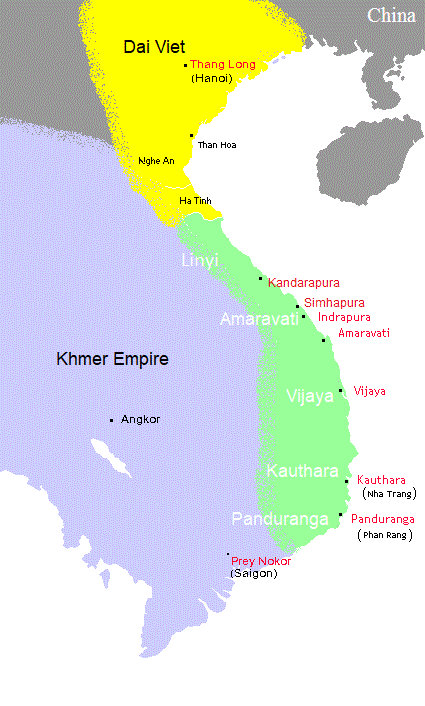
Map of Đại Việt (yellow) and Champa (green) in the 10th century

Map of Đại Việt (pink) and Champa (light blue) in the 1306

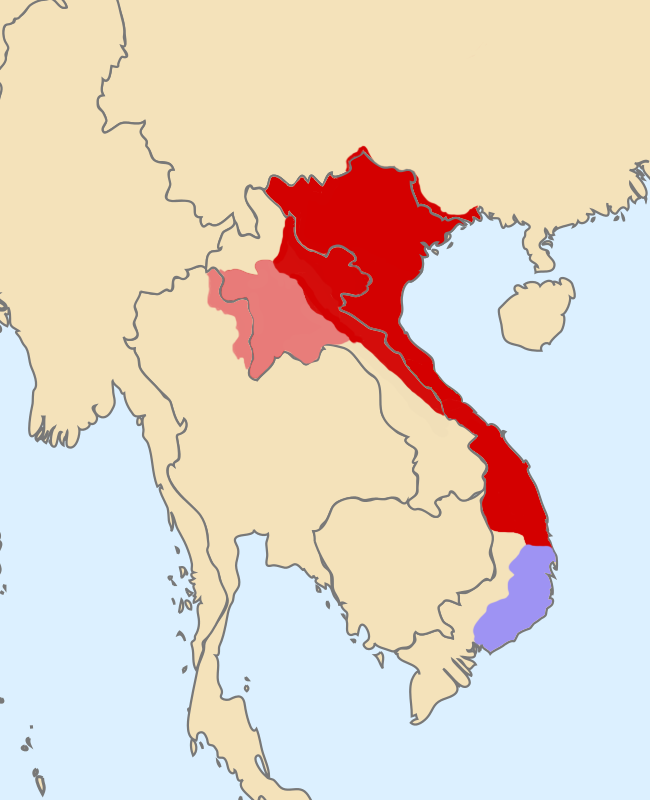
Map of Đại Việt (red) and Champa (purple) after the war in 1471.

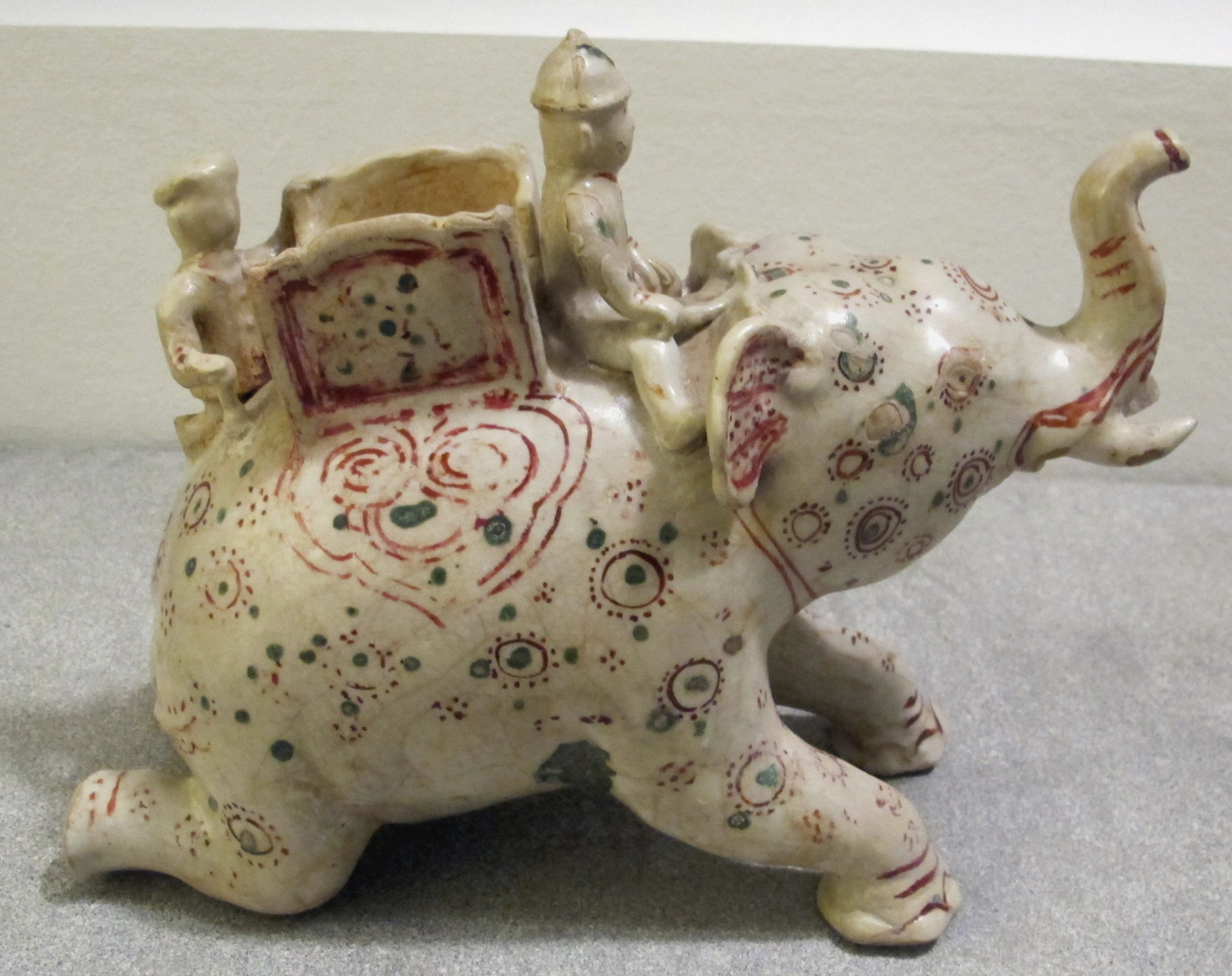
Vietnamese war elephant and soldiers pottery figure

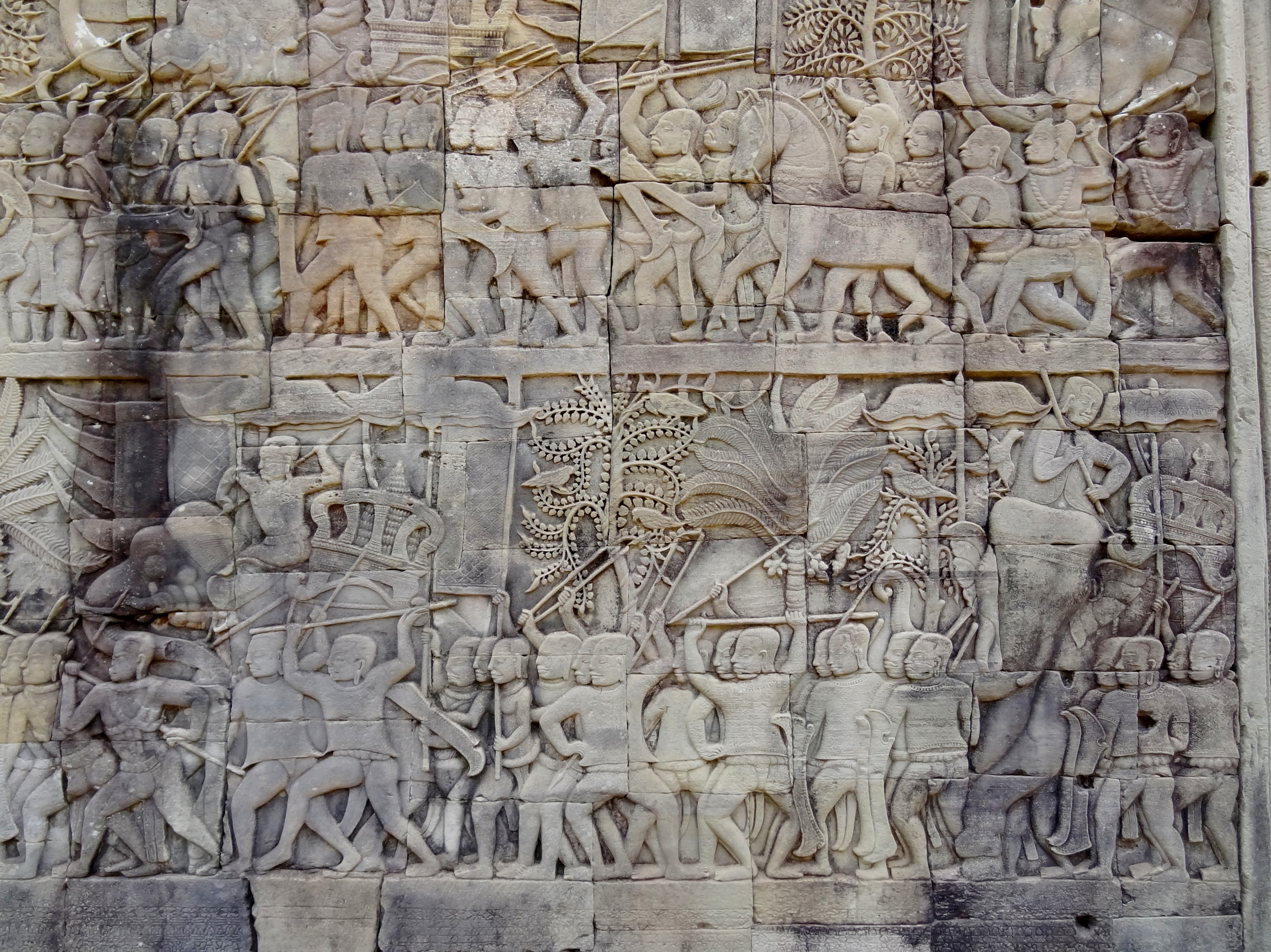
Khmer army on campaign in the 12th century

When the Viet founded a kingdom at the start of the 10th century, Champa, a kingdom to the south of Đại Việt, had become an established entity. As Champa had been independent, it found itself in need to defend its territory to contain the threat posed by the Khmer Empire in the west, and expand its territory to the north, hoping to conquer the Vietnamese nation. There, with the Vietnamese Kingdom in turmoil following the assassination of Đinh Tiên Hoàng, Champa made an unsuccessful attempt to invade Đại Việt in 979 in support of China, but failed due to the strong defense of Vietnamese territory under the command of Lê Hoàn. This watershed moment would give birth to an intense Cham–Vietnamese rivalry.

Over the next centuries, conflicts between the two combatants intensified as a result of the Vietnamese Nam tiến policy, or "march to the south" by penetrating Champa. As more Vietnamese settlers moved southward they began to expand their sphere of influence over the Cham indirectly, giving rise to numerous wars between the Vietnamese and the Chams. As Vietnamese expansionist policy continued under the Lý dynasty, the Vietnamese managed to occupy more Cham territory, which ultimately resulted in the emergence of the Dai Viet as a regional power. After 1104, the two countries went on to establish more peaceful relations for nearly two centuries.

=== Islamization and demise of Champa ===
After two peaceful centuries, and even an alliance during the Mongol invasions of Vietnam, tensions erupted once more due to the continued influx of Vietnamese settlers marching southward. Mistrust of the Vietnamese, which was prominent in the Cham court, led to a bloodier conflict from 1367 to 1396, in which the Cham nearly conquered Đại Việt, but which ended in stalemate. After the war, the Trần dynasty was weakened and toppled by the Hồ dynasty, at which point the Chams allied with China once more, helping the Ming dynasty to conquer Vietnam in 1407. This, however, proved to be detrimental for Champa, as the Vietnamese held strong resentment toward the Cham after expelling the Chinese in 1427.

At the same time, Arab and Malay traders brought Islam to the region. While Islam had started to spread in the 7th century in Southeast Asia, it was not until the 15th century that witnessed the growing development of Islam in Champa territory, then still dominated by Hinduism. Conversion to Islam among Chams started at the same time the restored Vietnamese Kingdom re-emerged as stronger and more aggressive, invading Champa in 1446. Subsequent Vietnamese attacks that finally demolished the Cham nation in 1471, also led to the surge of Islam to eventually become the dominant religion of the Cham people.

On the other hand, persecution against Chams became widespread and systematic assimilation became policy. The Chams, however, continued to rebel against the Vietnamese rulers, with the Chams revolting against Vietnamese rule five to six times in the 17th century, with each revolt being bloodily suppressed by the Vietnamese Nguyễn lords. The last remnants of Cham independence were wiped out in the 19th century, when the last Cham Kingdoms were absorbed by the Vietnamese. Two notable Cham revolts against Vietnamese encroachment in the early 19th century before the annexation of Champa by Dai Viet, Ja Lidong rebellion and Nduai Kabait rebellion, both featured indigenous Degar (highlander) tribes allying with indigenous Chams in struggle against pre-colonial Vietnamese colonisation.

In the 1830s, while the Siamese–Vietnamese wars were underway, the Chams initiated a major rebellion led by Katip Sumat, a Sunni Muslim cleric, which marked the first ever jihadist war against Vietnam in history. This rebellion, along with the Ja Thak Wa uprising beginning in 1834, was suppressed by the Nguyễn dynasty.

The Vietnamese Empire adopted repressive measures against the Chams, which some commentators have labeled genocide. Many Cham survivors fled to Cambodia, Thailand and the Malay Peninsula, and Islamic radicalism achieved a foothold among the Cham people. The Cham Hindus, while less active, were also accused and persecuted.

=== 20th century ===
While French imperialism largely ended the overt conflicts between Chams and Vietnamese, the two communities remained hostile to each other. The French government aggravated the mistrust between the two communities by favoring the Islamization of the Chams to counter the more populous Buddhist Vietnamese people. Political Islam gained popularity in response to the growing Vietnamese nationalist movement, which was seen as threatening to the Chams. The Salafist movement began to spread in Vietnam later, beginning during the Vietnam War, due to the efforts of Mohammad Badri, a Cham who had studied in Saudi Arabia.

Both governments openly persecuted Chams, both Hindus and Muslims alike, during the Vietnam War that followed. This led to Cham participation in various separatist struggles against both regimes, including the United Front for the Liberation of Oppressed Races, or FULRO, founded in 1964. Some Chams consider this as part of its jihad struggle; other observers have claimed that they were aided by the Cambodian and Service de Documentation Extérieure et de Contre-Espionnages.

In response, the Vietnamese government intensified its repression of the Cham following the end of the Vietnam War to achieve the goal of creating a homogeneous Vietnamese nation, inciting what has been called the second Cham genocide. In Cambodia, about 90,000–500,000 Chams were murdered by the Pol Pot Khmer Rouge regime during the Cambodian genocide. The Khmer Rouge hates the Cham people vigorously comparable to how they hate the Vietnamese, and tentatively depicted the Cham Muslims "belonging to the rootless bourgeoisie race" by contrast to agrarian Khmers. After the Cambodian–Vietnamese War, the Cham insurgency spread with heavy casualties for both Vietnamese and Cham forces. By the 1980s, the Cham insurgency declined and eventually ended.

Some Chams chose to emigrate rather than join in the insurgency, fleeing to Malaysia, Indonesia, Thailand, Yemen, Qatar, Turkey, Oman, Saudi Arabia and the United Arab Emirates; some later settled in the United States. The insurgency would end up in complete failure, as Vietnam enacted Đổi mới and rejoined the world. By this point, the remaining Cham population in Vietnam had been significantly reduced. While tensions between them have abated, the Chams and Vietnamese maintain their distance.

== List of conflicts ==
	Name	Result
1	Cham–Vietnamese War (982)	Vietnamese victory (Đại Cồ Việt) under Lê Hoàn. Vietnamese army sacks and burns the Indrapudra city, Champa kingdom capital city moves to Vijaya.
2	Cham–Vietnamese War (1021)	Vietnamese victory (Đại Cồ Việt) under Lý Thái Tông
3	Cham–Vietnamese War (1026)	Vietnamese (Đại Cồ Việt) invasion of Champa
4	Cham–Vietnamese War (1044)	Vietnamese victory (Đại Cồ Việt) under Lý Thái Tông. Cham capital Vijaya sacked.
5	Cham–Vietnamese War (1069)	Vietnamese victory (Đại Việt) under Lý Thánh Tông. Cham capital sacked again; Rudravarman III was taken prisoner before trying to escape to hostile Khmer Empire territory.
6	Cham–Vietnamese War (1074)	Cham victory under Harivarman IV, Vietnamese invasion repelled
7	Cham–Vietnamese War (1103–1104)	Both sides withdraw their forces.
8	Đại Việt–Khmer War (1123–1150)	The Khmers persuaded the Chams to jointly attack the Vietnamese by hooking into the Gulf of Tonkin. Both sides withdraw their forces. The Chams decided to stop assisting the Khmers by the 1138 campaign, so the Khmers targeted Champa instead.
9	Cham–Vietnamese War (1150)	Lý Anh Tông of Đại Việt decided to interfere Champa by supporting rebel factions, but was defeated. Cham victory under Jaya Harivarman I at the Battle of Mỹ Sơn.
10	Cham–Vietnamese War (1252)	Punitive expedition commanded by Trần Thái Tông intending to punish Champa for piracy. Vietnamese (Đại Việt) victory, Cham capital plundered.
11	Cham–Vietnamese War (1312)	Punitive expedition commanded by Trần Anh Tông. Vietnamese (Đại Việt) victory, Cham king taken hostage, vassalage of Champa to Đại Việt.
12	Cham–Vietnamese War (1318)	King of Champa, Chế Năng, tried to rebel against Đại Việt. Vietnamese victory, Cham king fled to Java, annexation of Champa by Đại Việt.
13	Cham–Vietnamese War (1326)	Chế A Nan revolted and regained independence of Champa from Đại Việt.
14	Cham–Vietnamese War (1353)	Failed Vietnamese (Đại Việt) seaborne attempt to reinstate Vietnamese influence in Champa.
15	Cham–Vietnamese War (1367–1390)	Status quo ante bellum. Both sides withdraw their forces (Vietnamese emperor Trần Duệ Tông was killed in the 1377 Battle of Vijaya while Champa king Po Binasuor was killed in a 1390 naval battle). The death of Trần Duệ Tông leads to the decline of the Trần dynasty. Hồ Quý Ly takes the power of the government, overthrows the Trần dynasty in 1400 and establishes the Hồ dynasty.
16	Cham–Vietnamese War (1400–1407)	Cham–China alliance victory; Đại Việt conquered by the Ming dynasty of China. The loss led to the Fourth Chinese domination of Vietnam.
17	Cham–Vietnamese War (1446)	Vietnamese victory (Đại Việt under Empress regent Nguyễn Thị Anh).
18	Cham–Vietnamese War (1471)	Vietnamese victory (Đại Việt under emperor Lê Thánh Tông); Vijaya is destroyed. Champa becomes a vassal state of Đại Việt and moves its capital city to Panduranga (Phan Rang).
19	Cham–Vietnamese War (1611)	Nguyễn lords victory under lord Nguyễn Hoàng. Champa loses more territories to the Nguyễn lords.
20	Cham–Vietnamese War (1653)	Nguyễn lords victory
21	Cham–Vietnamese War (1693)	Nguyễn lords victory
22	Cham rebellion (1693–94)	Nguyễn lords victory
23	Cham rebellion, an anti-Vietnamese rebellion by the Cham, occurs in 1728 after the death of their ruler Po Saktiraydaputih.	Uprising failed
24	Cham rebellion of 1746 led by Dương Bao Lai and Diệp Mã Lăng	Uprising failed
25	Ja Lidong rebellion (1822–23)	Uprising failed
26	Nduai Kabait rebellion (1826)	Uprising failed
27	Katip Sumat uprising against Vietnam (1832–1834)	Uprising failed (Kingdom of Champa fully annexed by Nguyễn dynasty)
28	Ja Thak Wa uprising (1834–1835)	Uprising failed
29	FULRO insurgency against Vietnam (1964–1992)	Uprising failed
