= Battle of Thị Nại Bay =

1283 battle in Vietnam

Battle of Thị Nại Bay (1283)
- Part of the Cham–Mongol War
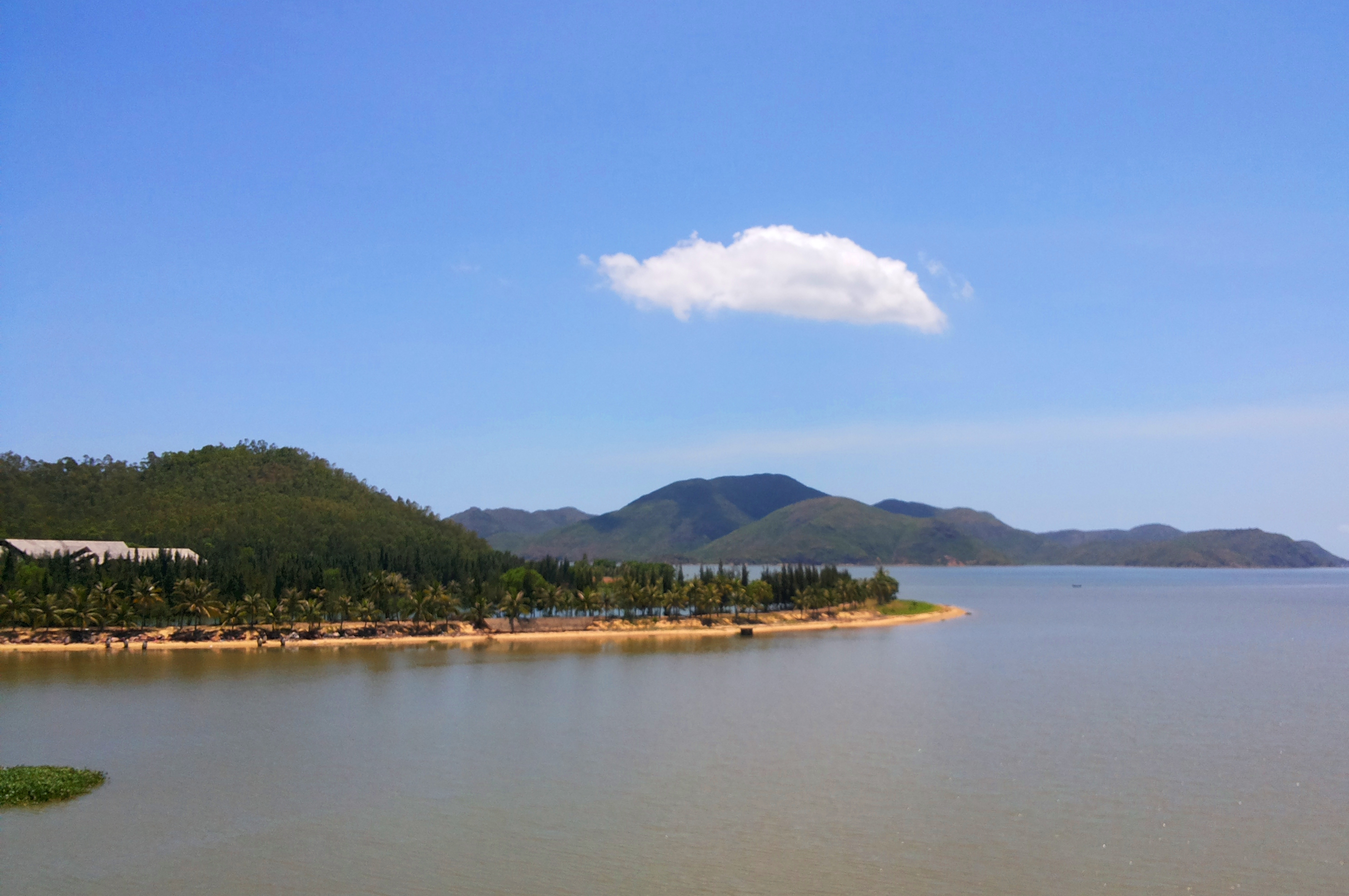
- Thị Nại Bay
Date	13–14 February 1283
Location	Thị Nại Bay, Qui Nhơn 13°46′N 109°14′E
Result	Yuan victory; Yuan dynasty seized Vijaya; Cham forces withdrew to the western highlands

Belligerents
Champa	Yuan dynasty

Commanders and leaders
Indravarman V Prince Harijit	Sogetu; Chen Chung-ta; Li Ch'uan; Cheng Pin

Strength
c. 10,000	5,000

Casualties and losses
No reliable estimate	No reliable estimate

The Battle of Thị Nại Bay was a military engagement between Champa and the Yuan dynasty in February 1283. The battle took place on the landing beach of Thị Nại Bay, near Champa's capital Vijaya (modern-day Qui Nhơn, Vietnam). Despite being outnumbered, the Yuan invaders managed to break the Cham defensive line, forced the Cham monarch Indravarman V to retreat to the western highlands, where he waged an successfully guerrilla campaign against the occupying Yuan forces.

== Background ==
In summer 1282, Kublai ordered Sogetu of the Jalairs, the governor of Guangzhou, to lead the punitive expedition against Champa. Kublai declared: "The old king (Jaya Indravarman V) is innocent. The ones who oppose to our order was his son (Harijit) and a Southern Chinese." In late 1282, a Yuan fleet of 5,000 men, 100 ships and 250 landing crafts began sailing to the capital of Champa.

The Chinese fleet arrived at the coast of Central Vietnam, near modern-day Qui Nhơn in February 1283. The Cham defenders had already built a fortified wooden fortress on the west shore of the bay, where the Yuan army would make landfall.

== Battle ==
The Yuan landed at midnight of 13 February. From the east, Cheng Pin and Chao Ta led 300 soldiers approaching the fort, while Chen Chung-ta, Li Ch'uan and Su Ch'uan commanded 1,600 troops approaching from the north, and the main army of 3,000 led by Sogetu to attack the fort from the south in three columns.

In the morning at 05:00 AM, the Cham opened the south gate, marched to the beach and met the Yuan with 10,000 men several elephants and around 100 Muslim trebuchet. The Cham divided their force into three columns, with some were carrying banners and beating the drum. The battle fought fiercely by both sides, but the skilled Mongol general managed to defeat the Cham army. The battle lasted until 01:00 AM, then Chinese troops from the north and east entered the fort, butchered and drowned several thousands of defenders. The Yuan seized enemy grain storage in addition to their supplies. The Cham king abandoned his temporary headquarter, set his warehouse on fire, killed the Mongol envoys Yu Yongxian and Yilan before evacuating into the mountains. Yuan troops captured Vijaya on 17 February for two days, then withdrew outside the city to set up their camps.
