= Virabhadravarman =

Vīrabhadravarmadeva
- Raja-di-raja
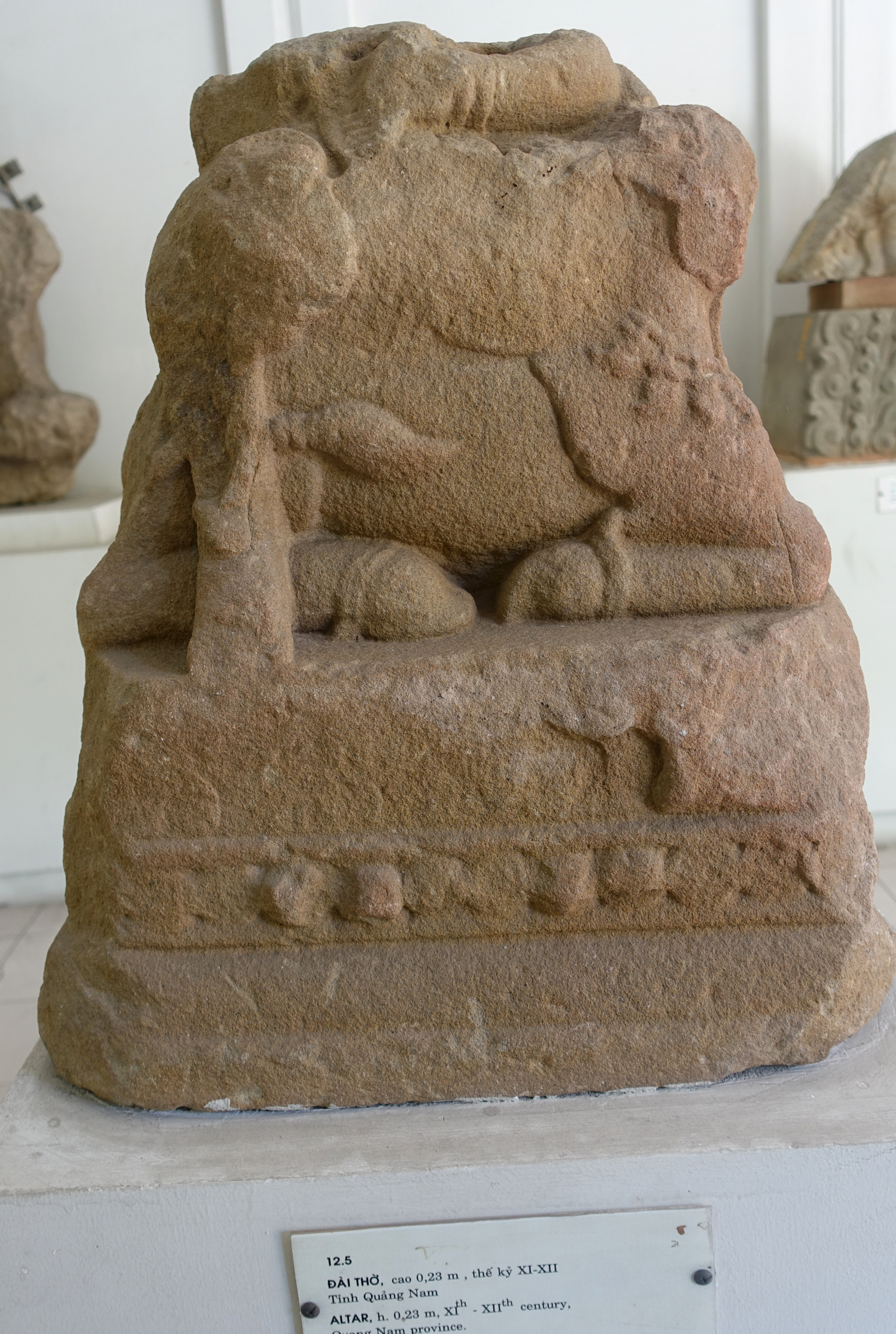
- Broken sculpture and inscription of Vīrabhadravarman dates 1365 Śaka (1443 AD), from Chiêm Sơn, Quảng Nam.

King of Champa
- Reign: 1441–1444/6?
- Coronation: 1441
- Predecessor: Indravarman VI
- Successor: unknown (probably Maha Kali?)
- Born: Unknown; Vijaya, Champa
- Died: Unknown ?
Names
- Śrīndra-Viṣṇukīrti Vīrabhadravarmadeva
- House: Vr̥ṣu dynasty
- Father: ?
- Mother: ?
- Religion: Hinduism

Vīrabhadravarman or Śrīndra-Viṣṇukīrti, was a king of Champa from the Simhavarmanid dynasty. He ruled the kingdom from 1441? to c. 1444. He was a grandson of illustrious King Jaya Simhavarman VI. He was also a nephew of Indravarman VI, and his grandmother was Queen Parameśvarī (top queen), a concubine of Simhavarman VI.

His older brother was Prince Saṁsāramūrti Vr̥ṣujaya, also known as Saṁsāramūrti.

== See also ==
- Maha Vijaya

== Bibliography ==
- Griffiths, Arlo (2019), "Epigraphical texts and Sculptural steles of 15th-Century Campā", in Griffiths, Arlo; Hardy, Andrew; Wade, Geoff (eds.), Champa: Territories and Networks of a Southeast Asian Kingdom, Danang: École française d’Extrême-Orient, pp. 193–220, ISBN 978-2-85539-269-1
- Schweyer, Anne-Valérie (2008), "L'époque dite décadente au Campā : vers une réhabilitation des 14e-15e siècles", in Pautreau, Jean-Pierre; Coupey, Anne-Sophie; Zeitoun, Valéry (eds.), Archaeology in Southeast Asian : From Homo Erectus to the Living Traditions, European Association of Southeast Asian Archaeologists. International Conference, pp. 221–230, ISBN 978-9-740-64564-1

Preceded by Indravarman VI 1400–1441	King of Champa; 1441–1446	Succeeded by unknown ?–?
