= Jaya Paramesvaravarman II =

King of Champa (d. 1254)

- Raja-di-raja

King of Champa
- Reign: 1220–1254
- Coronation: 1220
- Predecessor: Khmer occupation
- Successor: Jaya Indravarman VI
- Born: Unknown
- Died: 1254; Vijaya, Champa
Names
- Angsaraja of Tumpraukvijaya

Jaya Paramesvaravarman II, born Prince Angsaraja of Turai-vijaya, was the king of Champa from 1220 to 1254. He was the grandson of Jaya Harivarman I, but was raised in the court of Jayavarman VII. He attained the rank of Yuvaraja in 1201, led the Khmer Empire's attack on Dai Viet in 1207. Following the Khmer voluntary evacuation of Champa in 1220, in 1226, Angsaraja took a coronation ceremony (abhiseka) at the city of Vijaya, declaring his regnal name of Jaya Parameśvaravarman "reign with the single parasol over the state of Champa."

As king he restored irrigation works, ruins, and lingas. He also made great donations of rice fields and slaves of many different contemporary backgrounds, such as Cambodian (kvir), Cham (campa), Chinese (lov), Siamese (syaṁ), Paganese (vukāṁ), to the temple of Po Nagar, Nha Trang.

In 1233/34 Paramesvaravarman installed an image for Svayamutpanna in Phan Rang. He offered war prisoners and trophies to the God of Śrīpatīśvara at the sanctuary of Svayamutpanna. The splendors he donated include 9 captured Khmers, 22 Siamese, one Paganese, and a Khmer male elephant.

In 1252, nonstop territorial growth by Champa caused the Vietnamese king Tran Thai Tong to retaliate. In the process, he captured Jaya Paramesvaravarman II's concubine, Bo La Gia, and took other prisoners as well.

Preceded by Interregnum 1203–1220 (Khmer Vassal)	King of Champa; 1220–1254	Succeeded by Jaya Indravarman VI 1254–1265
