= Jaya Indravarman VI =

- Raja-di-raja

King of Champa
- Reign: 1254–1257
- Coronation: 1254
- Predecessor: Jaya Paramesvaravarman II
- Successor: Indravarman V
- Born: Unknown
- Died: 1257; Vijaya, Champa
Names
- Harideva of Sakãn-Vijaya

Jaya Indravarman VI was the King of Champa from 1254 to 1257.

== Personal life ==
He was the grandson of illustrious Jaya Harivarman I, and the younger brother of Jaya Paramesvaravarman II. "He was a very peaceful sovereign, given to 'all branches of knowledge and well versed in the philosophies of various schools'."

== Death ==
He was assassinated by Indravarman V, his nephew.

| Preceded by Jaya Paramesvaravarman II; 1220–1254 | King of Champa; 1254–1257 | Succeeded by Indravarman V 1257–1288 |
