= Maha Vijaya =

- Raja-di-raja

King of Champa
- Reign: 1441/42-1446
- Coronation: 1441/42
- Predecessor: Indravarman VI
- Successor: Maha Kali
- Born: Vijaya, Champa
- Died: Hanoi
- Religion: Hinduism

Maha Vijaya (摩訶賁該 in Chinese and Makha Bí Cai in Vietnamese), was a king of Champa, ruled the kingdom from 1441/42 to 1446. He was a nephew of Indravarman VI (Nauk Glaun Vijaya). According to Vietnamese chronicles, he usurped the throne of his brother Maha Kali in 1442.

In 1444, war broke out between Champa and Dai Viet. Dai Viet's king Le Nhan Tong sent a fleet from Nghe An to the coast of Binh Dinh, ransacked the Cham capital, and captured Maha Vijaya in 1446, and which later he spent years in prison in Hanoi, while his brother Maha Kali (who previously overthrown) was installed as the puppet king.

== See also ==
- Virabhadravarman

== Bibliography ==
- Maspero, Georges (2002), The Champa Kingdom, White Lotus Co., Ltd, ISBN 978-9-74753-499-3
