= Battle of Vijaya =

Historical Vietnamese military battle

- Part of Cham–Vietnamese War (1367–1390)
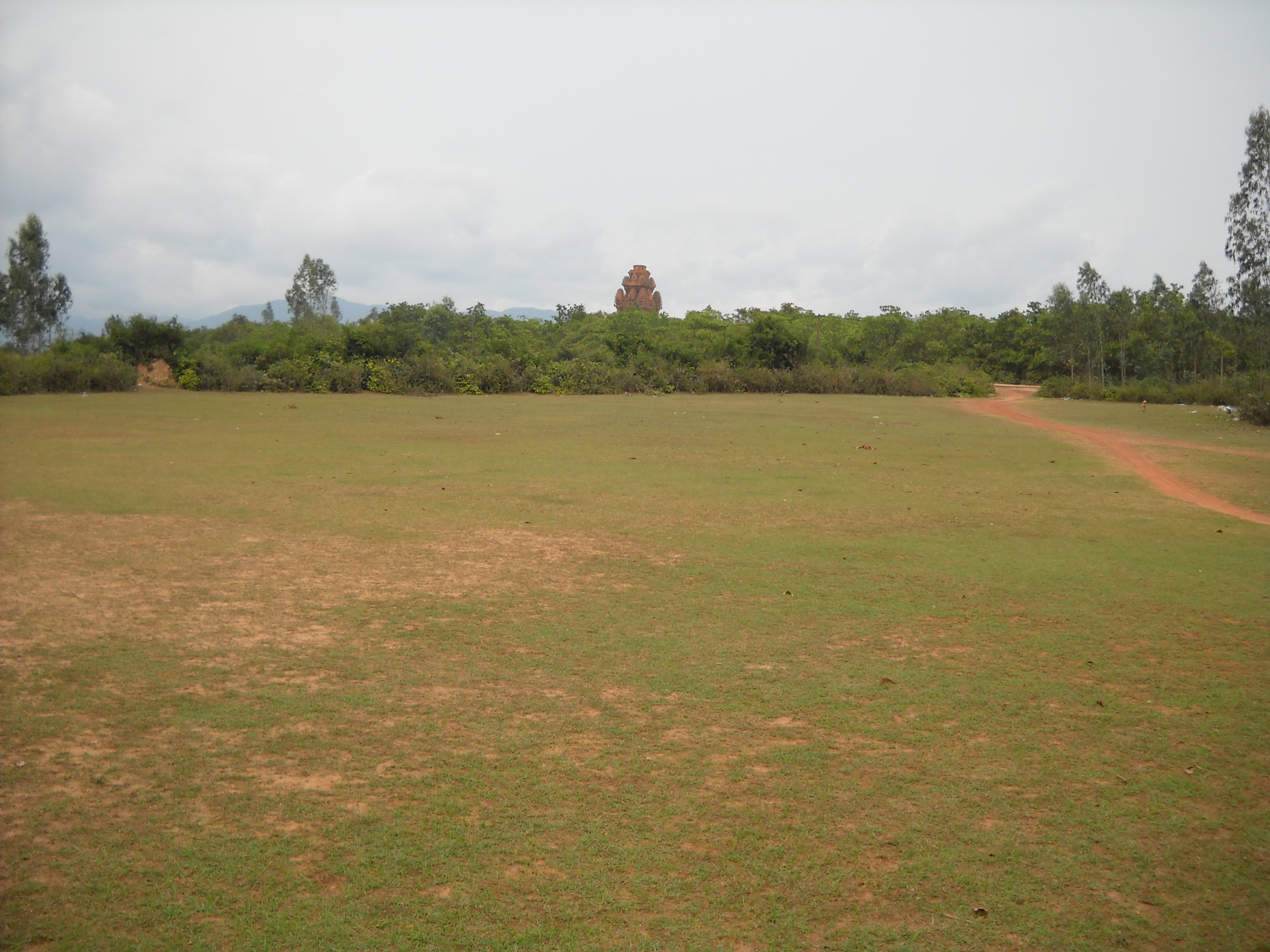
Date	1377 (Vietnam lunar calendar: 24 January)
Location	Vijaya (near modern-day An Nhơn, Vietnam)
Result	Champa victory

Belligerents
Đại Việt	Champa

Commanders and leaders
Trần Duệ Tông †; Đỗ Lễ †; Nguyễn Lạp Hòa †; Phạm Huyền Linh †; Trần Húc (surrendered); Lê Quý Ly	Po Binasuor

Strength
120,000	Unknown

Casualties and losses
~ 85,000 – 95,000	Unknown

The Battle of Vijaya (Vietnamese: trận Đồ Bàn) between Đại Việt and the kingdom of Champa was a siege of Vijaya, the Cham capital, in 1377. The Vietnamese forces were utterly defeated and the Đại Việt emperor, Trần Duệ Tông, died as a result of the battle.

== Aftermath ==
The death of Trần Duệ Tông was a turning point for Trần dynasty and Đại Việt. Po Binasuor revenged by advancing to the north, and successfully captured the Đại Việt capital of Thăng Long.
