= Jaya Ananda =

King of Champa

- Raja-di-raja

King of Champa
- Reign: 1318–1342
- Predecessor: Chế Năng
- Successor: Maha Sawa
- Vice-king: Jamo
- Born: An Nam
- Died: 1342; Champa
Names
- Patalthor
Regnal name
- Jaya Ananda

Jaya Ananda or Chế A Nan was made the king of Champa to replace Chế Năng, who had been defeated by Vietnam and escaped to Java. Jaya Ananda won Champa's independence against the Vietnamese Emperor Trần Minh Tông in 1326.

== Biography ==
Jaya Ananda was born in the southernmost part of Đại Việt and served as a commander in the army of Cham King Chế Năng. In 1318 just after the expulsion of Chế Năng, the Vietnamese Trần dynasty appointed Jaya Ananda as Vice King of the Dedicated City (效城亞王) to formally turn Champa into a vassal state.

According to the tradition of Champa at that time, any figure who held the leadership of the five Champa states alliance must have come from the Areca or Coconut tribe, but Jaya Ananda did not meet that standard and was constantly opposed by the Cham nobles from 1323 to 1326. In order to seek a legitimate role, in 1323 Jaya Ananda had to send his younger brother Pao Yeou Patseutcho to pay tribute to the Yuan dynasty to gain recognition from the imperial court. From the northern neighbor, the Vietnamese Emperor Trần Minh Tông was afraid that Champa would slip out of his control once it gained protection from China, so in 1326 the Trần dynasty sent troops to attack Champa, but unexpectedly was repelled. Afterwards, without official recognition by the Trần dynasty, Champa existed as an independent state, no longer maintaining any ties with Đại Việt.

After he died in 1336, his Cham brother-in-law Tra Hoa Bo De fought the legitimate heir, Che Mo, for the throne for 6 years.

In 1342, Che Mo fled to the court of Tran Du Tong (where he died soon after a failed expedition to restore him to the Champa throne in 1353), Tra Hoa Bo De became king of Champa in that year.

== See also ==
- History of the Cham–Vietnamese wars
- Odoric of Pordenone

Preceded by Chế Năng 1312–1318	King of Champa; 1318–1336	Succeeded by Maha Sawa 1342–1360
