= Trần Duệ Tông =

Trần Duệ Tông 陳睿宗
- Emperor of Đại Việt
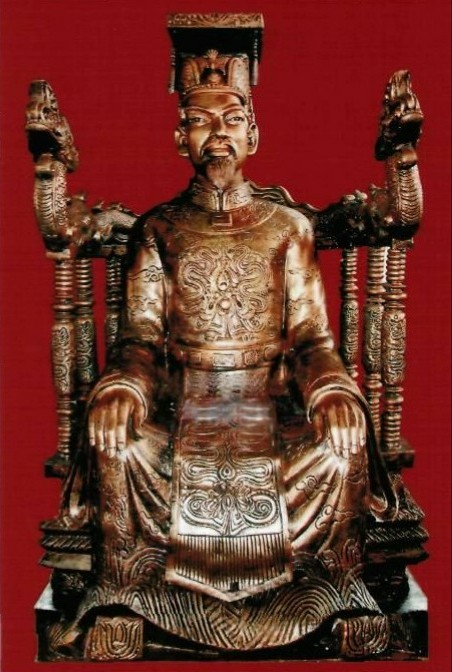

Emperor of Trần dynasty
- Reign: 1373–1377
- Predecessor: Trần Nghệ Tông
- Successor: Trần Phế Đế
- Born: 30 June 1337; Thăng Long, Đại Việt
- Died: 4 March 1377 (aged 39); Vijaya, Champa
- Burial: Hi Tomb
- Spouse: Empress Consort Gia Từ
- Issue: Trần Hiện
Names
- Trần Kính (陳曔)
Era dates
- Long Khánh (隆慶, 1373–1377)
Regnal name
- Emperor Kế Thiên Ứng Vận Nhân Minh Khâm Ninh (繼天應運仁明欽寕皇帝)
Posthumous name
- Emperor Kế-thiên -vận Nhân-minh Khâm-hiếu (繼天應運仁明欽孝皇帝)
Temple name
- Duệ Tông (睿宗)
- House: Trần dynasty
- Father: Trần Minh Tông
- Mother: Imperial Consort Đôn Từ
- Religion: Buddhism

Trần Duệ Tông (chữ Hán: 陳睿宗, 1337–1377), real name Trần Kính (陳曔), was the ninth emperor of the Trần dynasty who reigned Vietnam from 1373 to 1377. Duệ Tông succeeded the throne from his brother Trần Nghệ Tông who was credited with the re-establishment of Trần clan's ruling in Vietnam from Hôn Đức Công. During his short-lived reign, Duệ Tông had to witness the rising of Hồ Quý Ly in the imperial court and several consecutive attacks in Vietnam from Chế Bồng Nga, king of Champa. In 1377 Duệ Tông decided to personally command a major military campaign against Champa, this campaign was ended by the disastrous defeat of Trần's army in Battle of Vijaya where Duệ Tông himself was killed in action with many other high-ranking mandarins and generals of Vietnam. Duệ Tông's death was one of the main events that led to the collapse of Trần Dynasty in 1400.

== Background ==
Duệ Tông was born in 1337 as Trần Kính, eleventh child of the Emperor Emeritus Minh Tông and Imperial Consort Đôn Từ, he was younger brother of three emperors Hiến Tông, Dụ Tông and Nghệ Tông and was entitled as Prince Cung Tuyên. During the reign of Dương Nhật Lễ, it was Prince Cung Tuyên who supported his brother Prince Cung Định Trần Phủ overthrow Nhật Lễ to regain the power for Trần clan, Prince Cung Tuyên was also the most important figure of this plot who personally prepared soldiers and arms for Prince Cung Định, or Trần Nghệ Tông from 1370.

Because of Prince Cung Tuyên's essential role in helping the Emperor to take over the power, Nghệ Tông decided to cede the throne to his younger brother, now Trần Duệ Tông in 1373 and held the title Retired Emperor. After the coronation, Duệ Tông changed the era name to Long Khánh (隆慶, great joy, 1373–1377).

== As emperor ==
According to Đại Việt sử ký toàn thư, although having an active part in the overthrown of Dương Nhật Lễ, Trần Duệ Tông was indeed an arrogant and hard-headed ruler. who ignored the advice from mandarins about the power of Champa's army, therefore right after the enthronement he began to prepare a military campaign in the southern border against Chế Bồng Nga's troop. Duệ Tông officially announced his plan of attacking Champa in December 1373 while there were several revolts rising right in Đại Việt.

On the other hand, Duệ Tông had some activities to improve the domestic situation after the chaos during Dụ Tông and Nhật Lễ's reigns such as establishing the imperial examination in February 1374 or re-organizing army and the administrative system. In the imperial court the Emperor appointed Hồ Quý Ly, whose cousin is Empress Gia Từ, for the position of military counsellor and Trần Nguyên Đán for the position of controlling the northern border.

Another factor that reinforced the Emperor's decision for the decisive military campaign Champa was the refusal of Chế Bồng Nga to pay tribute for Đại Việt, afterwards historical books reveal that actually king of Champa did send fifteen trays of gold to Đại Việt but Đỗ Tử Bình, official responsible for the southern border, kept the gold for himself while reported to the imperial court that there was not any tribute from Champa. In December 1376, Duệ Tông personally commanded an army of 12.000 Vietnamese soldiers advanced towards Champa capital Vijaya while Hồ Quý Ly took charge of the campaign's logistics and Đỗ Tử Bình conducted the rearguard. On January 23 of Lunar calendar, 1377, Duệ Tông's army arrived at Thị Nại near the capital of Champa Đồ Bàn. In a plot of luring the opponent to his trap in Đồ Bàn, Chế Bồng Nga had a small mandarin pretend to surrender who made Duệ Tông believe that Champa's army had fled from the empty capital. The next day, Duệ Tông led his army directly to the ambush that Chế Bồng Nga prepared for him. As a result, Trần army was heavily defeated in this Battle of Đồ Bàn where the Emperor himself was killed in action with many other high-ranking mandarins, generals and seventy percent of his troops. On the contrary, Hồ Quý Ly and Đỗ Tử Bình survived because they both ran away from the battle instead of trying to rescue the Emperor. Afterwards, Đỗ Tử Bình was only dismissed to the position of plain soldier by the order of Nghệ Tông while Hồ Quý Ly even did not have to face with any charge.

After the death of the Emperor, the Retired Emperor in May 1377 passed the throne to Duệ Tông's eldest prince, Prince Kiến Đức Trần Hiện, now Trần Phế Đế.

== Family ==
Trần Nghệ Tông had two wives:

- Lady Lê, who was entitled as Empress Gia Từ after the coronation of Duệ Tông.
- A consort who was daughter of Trần Liêu.

Nghệ Tông had four children:

- Prince Chương Vũ Trần Vĩ
- Trần Hiện (1361–1388), who eventually became Trần Phế Đế
- Trần Nguyên Diệu
- Trần Nguyên Hi

Trần Duệ Tông House of Trần Born: 1337 Died: 1377
Regnal titles
Preceded by Trần Nghệ Tông	Emperor of Trần Dynasty; 1373–1377	Succeeded by Trần Phế Đế
