= Indravarman VI =

- Raja-di-raja

King of Champa
- Reign: 1400–1441
- Predecessor: Simhavarman VI
- Successor: Virabhadravarman
- Born: Unknown; Champa
- Died: 1441; Champa
Names
- Vr̥ṣu-Viṣṇujāti Vīrabhadravarmadeva (early years); Śrī Vr̥ṣu-Indravarman-Viṣṇujāti Vīrabhadravarmadeva (later years); Vr̥ṣuvaṁśa
Regnal name
- Vīrabhadravarmadeva (1400–1432); Indravarman (1432–1441)
- House: Vr̥ṣu dynasty

Indravarman VI, Ba Dich Lai, Chang-pa-ti-lai, Virabhadravarman, or Ngauk Klaung Vijaya was a king of Champa, ruling from 1400 to 1441. He took the regnal name Indravarman when crowned in 1432.

== Reign ==
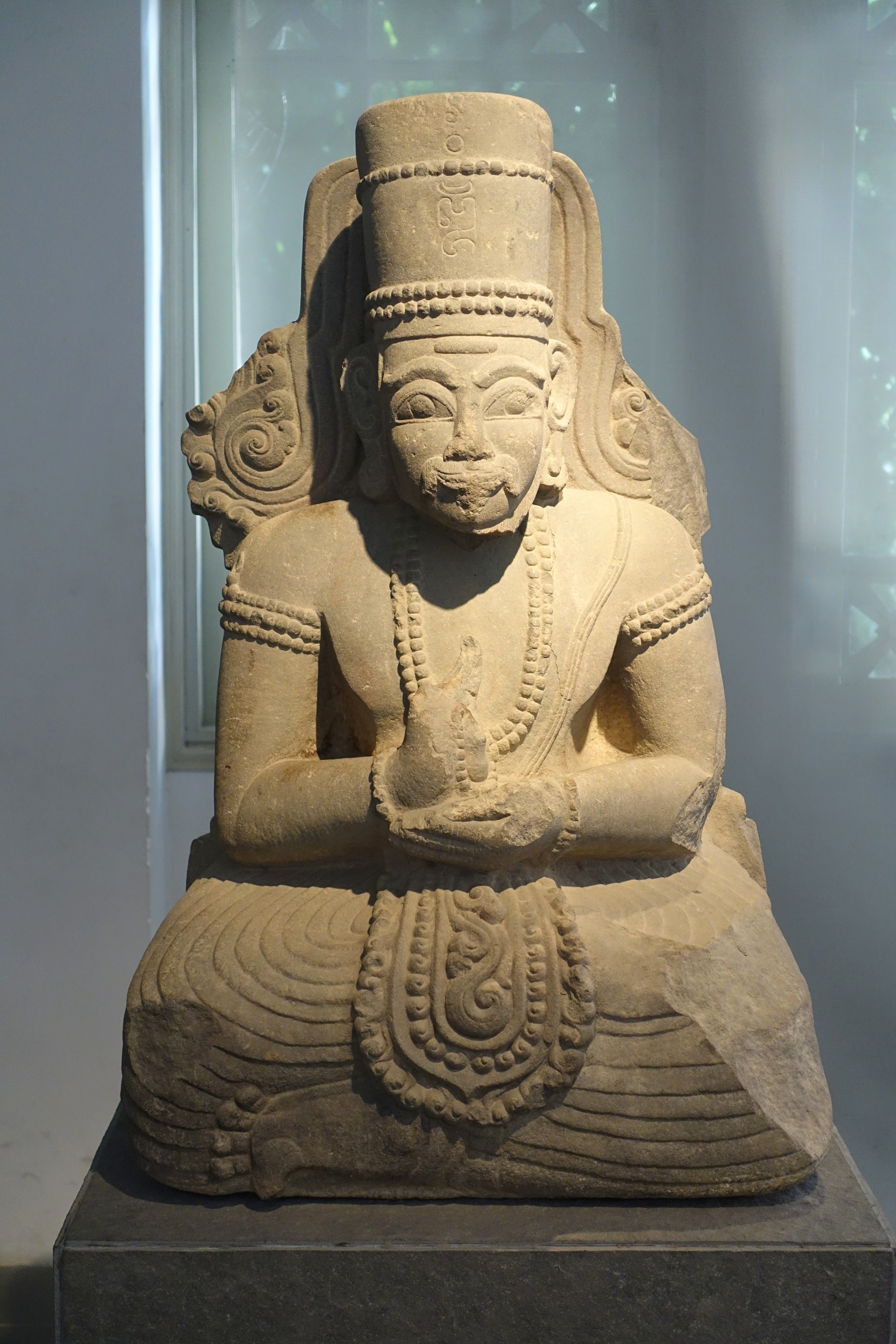
A male deity sculpture from Dai Huu, Binh Dinh, early 15th century. Museum of Vietnamese History. Text in Old Cham read: Om. Homage to Śiva. Hail!

Vr̥ṣu-Viṣṇujāti Virabhadravarman or Vr̥ṣuvaṁśa was the son of king Simhavarman VI. In 1403, the Vietnamese resumed their hostility and laid siege of capital Vijaya, where they faced defeat and were forced to leave after nine months. In 1405, he filed a memorial to the Ming court, convicting the Dai Ngu king Ho Han Thuong for violating his borders and conducting raids in his kingdom in the previous year. When the Dai Ngu were defeated by the Ming dynasty in 1407, Indravarman managed to reconquer Champa's lost territories south of the Hai Van Pass. He then erected a sitting Śiva statue in Drang Lai, Gia Lai. To celebrate his victory over the Viets, he ordered the establishment of a city called Samṛddhipurī (nowadays An Khe) in 1409.

Indravarman took advantage of declining Khmer Empire to fill up void by attacking Angkor territories, which led Cambodian king Ponhea Yat to seek intervention from the Chinese. In 1408 and 1414, Ming army from recent occupying Jiaozhi (former Dai Viet) poked into Champa and sent a threat to Indravarman, demanding him to cease hostility against Cambodia.

In 1421, Indravarman commemorated his victory over the Khmer with a statue of Tribhuvanākrānta (Vishnu) in Bien Hoa.

In order to maintain Đại Việt neutrality, he gave up the important province of Indrapura. Maspero lists Nauk Glaun Vijaya as the son of Jaya Simhavarman VI, which may be the same individual, but states he did not assume his father's reign after his death in 1441. Instead, a nephew, Maha Vijaya, ascended the throne.

== Family ==
Indravarman VI belongs to the Vr̥ṣu lineage of Simhavarman VI. His nephew was Maha Vijaya (in Chinese and Vietnamese sources) or Virabhadravarman, there are indicators that two characters may be the same individual.

== The city of Samriddhipuri (An Khê) ==
During Indravarman VI's reign, Cham sphere of influence penetrated deep into the present day Central Highlands. He erected an inscription at the city of Samriddhipuri (now An Khê, Gia Lai province) in 1438 to commemorate his victories over the Viets (yvan) and the Khmer (kvīra). He offered the city inhabitants a Viet princess, Viet war prisoners, a white elephant, and spoilers he had seized from the Dai Viet. In 1435 he ordered the masonry of a Śiva sculpture to symbolize his connections with the highlanders.
