= Indravarman V =

- King of Champa

King of Champa
- Reign: 1257–1288
- Predecessor: Jaya Indravarman VI
- Successor: Jaya Simhavarman III
- Born: Champa
- Died: 1288; Champa
- Spouse: Paramaratnāstrī; Suryalaksṃī; Gaurendraksmi
- Issue: Jaya Simhavarman III; Princess Süryadevī
Names
- Indravarman cei Harideva; Jaya Siṁhavarmadeva
Regnal name
- Indravarman
Posthumous name
- Paramodbhava

Indravarman V, Harideva, or Jaya Simhavarman, was a king of Champa whose reign began in 1257 when he assassinated his uncle Jaya Indravarman VI, but waited until 1266 for his coronation. Declining to submit himself in person to the Mongol Khan, Kublai Khan, he nevertheless "subjected himself to this humiliation" of the Mongol commanders Sogetu and Liu Chong dividing his kingdom into administrative units. His son, Chế Mân, "could not resign himself."

Sogetu launched an invasion in 1282, forcing Indravarman and Harijit to flee to the mountains. Refusing to present himself in court and make an act of vassalage, he subjected the Mongols to suffer "heat, illness, and a lack of supplies." Desertions amongst the Mongols also took their toll. Finally, after Sogetu's death in 1285, "Champa found itself delivered of the Mongols."

Indravarman did send an ambassador to Kublai on 6 Oct. 1285, and probably died soon afterwards.

== Family ==
=== Spouses ===
1. Queen Paramaratnāstrī
2. Queen Suryalaksṃī
3. Queen Gaurendraksmi

=== Children ===
1. Princess Süryadevī, daughter of Queen Paramaratnāstrī. She got married with a noble man named On Rasunandana.
2. Prince Harijit Paramatmaja (Chế Mân), son of Queen Gaurendralaksṃi.

Preceded by Jaya Indravarman VI 1254–1257	King of Champa; 1257–1288	Succeeded by Jaya Sinhavarman III 1288–1307
