= Maha Sawa =

- Raja-di-raja

King of Champa
- Reign: 1342–1360
- Predecessor: Jaya Ananda
- Successor: Po Binasuor
- Born: Unknown; Champa
- Died: 1360; Champa
Names
- Maha Sawa

Maha Sawa or Trà Hòa bố để was a king of Champa from 1342 to 1360. When his brother-in-law Che Anan died in 1342, Tra Hoa claimed the throne.

Che Anan's legitimate heir, Jamo (or Che Mo), was angered by this and later sought help from the country Trần dynasty .

| Preceded by Jaya Ananda 1318–1342 | King of Champa; 1342–1360 | Succeeded by Po Binasuor (Cei Bunga) 1360–1390 |
