= Champa–Đại Việt War (1471) =

Invasion of the Kingdom of Champa

Champa–Đại Việt War of 1471
- Map of Đại Việt (dark pink) and Champa (light blue) before the war
Date	February – March 22, 1471
Location	Champa, Đại Việt
Result	Đại Việt victory
Territorial changes	Northern Champa (now Quảng Nam, Quảng Ngãi and north of Phú Yên) was annexed to Đại Việt; Champa was reduced to Panduranga; Champa became the vassal state of Đại Việt until being annexed in 1832 by emperor Minh Mạng; Destruction of Hindu societal establishments in Champa

Belligerents
Champa	Đại Việt

Commanders and leaders
Maha Sajan (POW)	Lê Thánh Tông; Đinh Liệt

Strength
100,000 (including elephant corps)	250,000: 150,000 land forces; 100,000 naval forces

Casualties and losses
60,000 fatalities 30,000 POW; 40,400 beheaded	Unknown

The Cham–Đại Việt War of 1471 or Vietnamese invasion of Champa was a military expedition launched by Emperor Lê Thánh Tông of Đại Việt under the Lê dynasty and is widely regarded as the event that marked the downfall of Champa. In retaliation for Cham raids, Vietnamese forces attacked and sacked the kingdom's largest city-state, Vijaya, and defeated the Cham army, bringing the kingdom of Champa to an end. After this war, the border between Đại Việt and Champa was moved from Hải Vân Pass to Cù Mông Pass from 1471 till 1611 when Nguyễn lords launched another invasion into Phú Yên in the south and annexed it in 1611.

== Background ==
The Cham and the Vietnamese had a long history of conflict. In the course of their wars, peace often coincided with economic exhaustion, with the antagonists rebuilding their economies just to go to war again.

When fighting resumed in 1471, the Champa kingdom found itself weakened and isolated. It had experienced numerous civil wars and, at one point, had five different rulers. Because of the Cham's earlier attack on Angkor, the Khmers ignored their request for assistance when Đại Việt invaded. After an expedition to Champa in 1446, Vietnamese efforts to hold the Cham king as a vassal quickly failed and relations between the two kingdoms deteriorated.

From the mid-15th century onwards, Champa's power steadily waned. No Vijaya Champa inscription or document survives after 1456, but this might have been due to the destruction of the mandalas in 1471 by the Vietnamese. The incompletely-studied decline of Champa, as historian Michael Vickery has asserted, must be pieced together from Vietnamese and Chinese histories and competently restudied.

According to the Ming Shilu, the Dai Viet launched a preliminary incursion into Champa in 1461, which forced the king's younger brother Mo-he-pan-luo-yue (摩訶槃羅悅) to flee to the mountains. The ruling king was Pan-luo-cha-quan (槃羅茶全), Panlotchatsuen (in Jesuit Notice Historique Sur la Cochinchine) or Trà Toàn, who allegedly reigned from 1460 to 1471 until he was captured by the Dai Viet.

The Cham also requested intervention from Ming China and help bringing the Vietnamese back in line by force and demarcating the border between Champa and Vietnam. China, however, only verbally rebuked the Vietnamese for their incursion, as the Ming Chinese sought to preserve trade and border security rather than continue expansion. The Vietnamese ignored the rebuke and proceeded with their plan to destroy their rival.

The new Emperor of Dai Viet, Lê Thánh Tông, was a Confucian student. One of his key goals in diplomacy was fostering a Sinocentric worldview among Southeast Asian states; he wanted to get rid of formal connection with other Southeast Asian kingdoms in an effort to transform his kingdom from an 'eclectic Southeast Asian aristocratic model' to the bureaucratic one based on Ming China's institutions. His focus on relations with Champa was "to bring civilization (Sinitic-leaning) to whom he considers uncivilized".

To achieve his plan of overthrowing Champa, Thánh Tông spent years preparing the military, stockpiling provisions, and escalating incidents and animosity toward the Cham. These efforts included mobilisation of huge manpower forces and in particular, the gunpowder unit, significantly drawn from the Ming model. Special emphasis was placed on weapons, transportation, and communications. Finally, Thánh Tông amplified and exaggerated Cham raids in his reports to the Ming, highlighting them as pretexts for war against Champa.

== Campaign ==
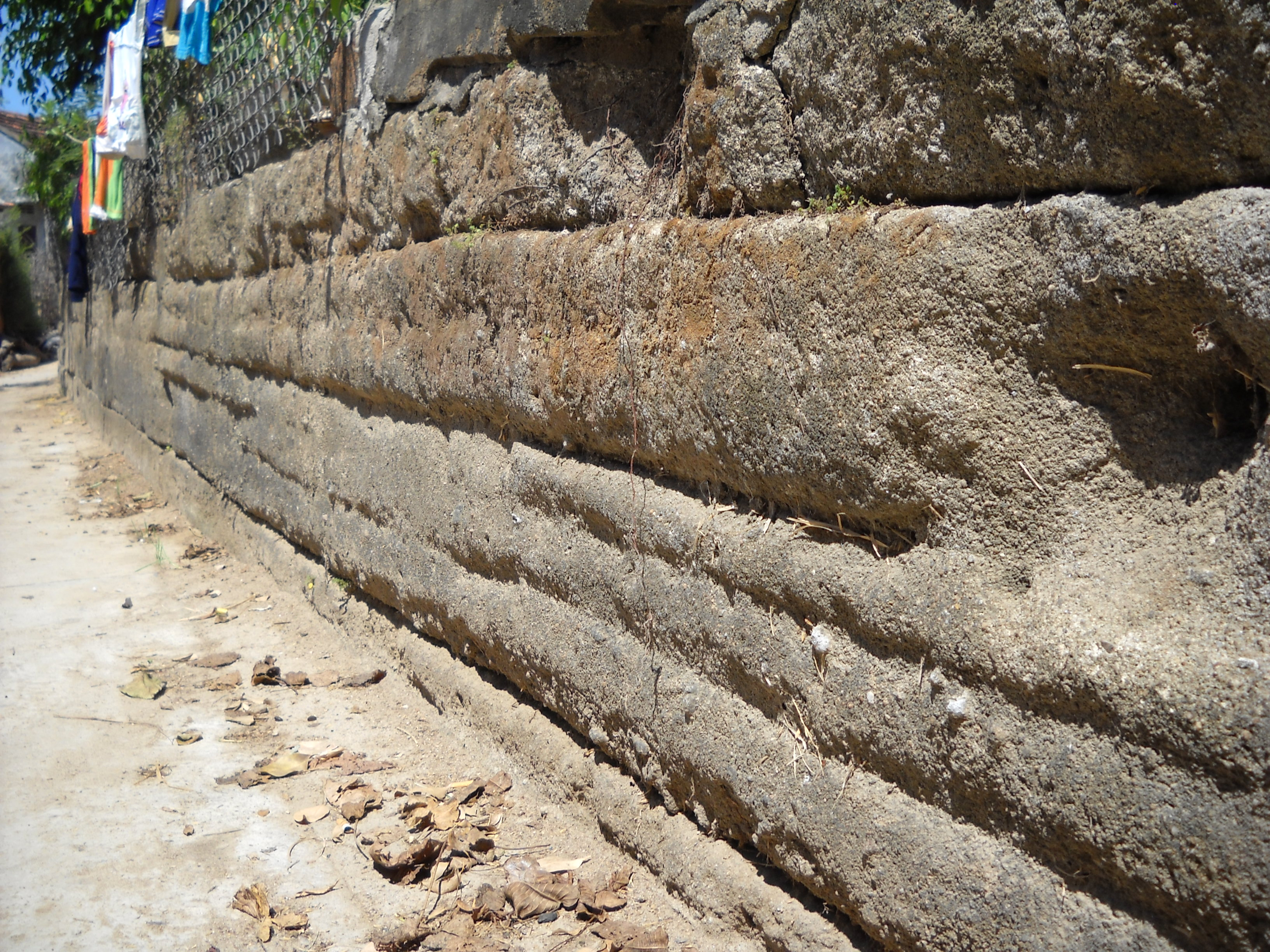
Remnant of the wall of Thi Nai citadel, near Vijaya (Cha Ban)

According to Vietnamese sources, in 1470 a Cham army numbering 100,000 under King Maha Sajan arrived and besieged the Vietnamese garrison at Huế. The local commander sent appeals to Hanoi for help. Thánh Tông responded angrily to the attack. Within weeks, soldiers were mobilised, provisions were collected and transported south, and delegations hastened to inform the Ming court of what was planned. Three months later, during the winter season, Thánh Tông published the detailed campaign orders to his generals and proclaiming in a long edict the reasons for the expedition. The edict routinely depicted the Cham as subhuman beasts. The emperor noted that "like animals, they eat their fill and forget their moral debt", and he declared that "in the south, we see a pig wallowing in the mud." In short, Thánh Tông's edict is considerably important to historians, because it can be regarded as a "classic, and literal, example of the dehumanising process necessary for and often a prelude to acts of genocide."

On November 28, 1470, a 100,000-strong Vietnamese naval expedition led by Thánh Tông himself set out from Hóa Châu to attack Champa, followed by another 150,000 civilian support personnel on December 8. The Phủ biên tạp lục states that the king reached Thuận Hóa citadel in early 1471, while the Toàn thư says he sailed straight to Champa. Fighting started on February 24, 1471, when 500 Vietnamese warships and 30,000 troops were ordered forth to block the way of 5,000 reinforced Cham troops and elephants at Bay of Sa Kỳ (20 miles south of Quảng Ngãi). Then 1,000 warships and 70,000 troops followed under the leadership of Thánh Tông, trying to flank Cham positions from the north. The fleet began disembarking troops on land near Hội An (Great Chiêm Estuary) and began engaging Cham defenders.

Meanwhile, another Vietnamese column quietly moved west of the mountains. After bitter fighting, the Cham withdrew their defence inland away from the coast, where they realised that they had been surrounded by invaders from three sides: from the north, from the western mountains, and from the sea. On February 26, using heavy artillery, the king besieged and captured the Mễ Cần citadel in Quảng Ngãi, killing 300 Chams. The Vietnamese continued to advance, using gunpowder superiority to curb war elephants, pushing the Cham army towards the capital of Vijaya (Cha Ban).

=== Siege of Vijaya ===
After two weeks of fierce fighting, one-third of Champa territory corresponding to today’s Đà Nẵng, Quảng Nam, and Quảng Ngãi had been taken by the Vietnamese. Thánh Tông's army then marched southwards towards Bình Định, main centre of the Champa Kingdom. Nearby Thị Nại citadel on the coast was captured on March 18, and 400 Cham were killed. Thánh Tông then converged his armies to surround the city of Vijaya (12 miles west of Thị Nại) on March 19, where the Champa king was seeking refuge inside. According to Vietnamese sources, the Cham king Trà Toàn apparently tried to compromise and make an agreement for his kingdom's surrender, but Thánh Tông ignored him and continued the siege.

The attackers surrounded Vijaya by multiple circumventing lines of fences and trenches, cutting off the besieged defenders from relief while launching continual terrifying bombardments and scaling ladder attacks against the defenders on the city walls. This came at a massive financial cost, since it drained the Vietnamese treasury of 1,000 gold liang a day. The Vietnamese forces used cannons to bombard the Cham capital, Vijaya, blasting a breach in the east of the city's walls prior to storming the city. On March 22, the city fell after a four-day siege. More than 30,000 Chams were captured, including Trà Toàn and his family members, who were deported to the north, and over 60,000 killed. Another 40,000 were executed.

The Malay Annals accounts for the fall of Champa mention that the king of Kuchi (Đại Việt) sent messengers to the Treasure Minister of Champa, deceiving him to defect and open the city gate. At dawn the men of Đại Việt entered the city and vanquished the Cham defenders with ease, Yak (Vijaya) fell and the king of Champa was slain.

== Aftermath ==
The balance of power maintained between the Cham and the Vietnamese for more than 500 years came to an end with the destruction of the Champa kingdom. The Vietnamese enslaved several thousand Chams and forced Chams to assimilate into Vietnamese culture. The number included 50 members of the royal family. In 1509, Thánh Tông's grandson, Lê Uy Mục, carried out a massacre against remaining Cham royal members and slaves in the neighbourhood of the capital Hanoi. In autumn of that year, the king also issued execution orders for all remaining Cham prisoners who had been captured in the 1471 war.

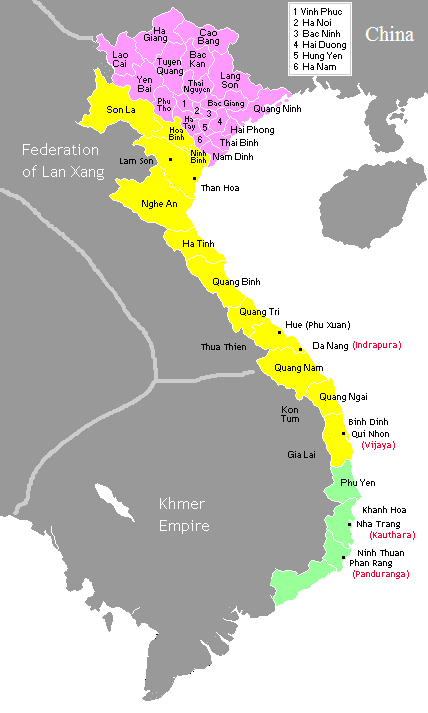
Territory of Champa(light green) after invasion.

A Cham general, Bố Trì Trì, fled and established himself as the ruler of the rump state of Panduranga (modern Phan Rang), more than 250 kilometers to the south. That state lasted until 1832, when emperor Minh Mạng initiated the final conquest of the remnants of Champa. Trì Trì and two others, a ruler in the Central Highlands (the region of Kon Tum and Pleiku) and a ruler on the coast immediately to the south of Bình Định (in the modern provinces of Phú Yên and Khánh Hòa), subsequently submitted to Thánh Tông as vassals. In the conquered land, king Thánh Tông established Quảng Nam as Đại Việt's 13th province, with 42 military colonies (Đồn điền), setting up administration, customary, regulations,... according to Vietnamese Confucian establishment. Đỗ Tử Quy was appointed as governor of Quảng Nam.

Cham representatives told the Ming Empire that Annam destroyed their country. The Chinese Ming Dynasty records evidence of the extent of the Vietnamese destruction wrought on Champa. The Chams informed the Ming that they continued to fight against the Vietnamese occupation of their land, which had been turned into the 13th province of Đại Việt. In 1474, Bố Trì Trì rebelled against the Vietnamese by mounting guerilla warfare in the western mountainous jungles with Trà Toàn's son Trà Toại. Thánh Tông sent Lê Niệm and 30,000 soldiers to Panduranga, where they put down the Cham revolt, captured Trà Toại and imprisoned him in a dungeon at Hanoi. Cham resistance continued in the mountains and valleys in the south. The Ming annals recorded in 1485 that "Champa is a distant and dangerous place, and Annam is still employing troops there."

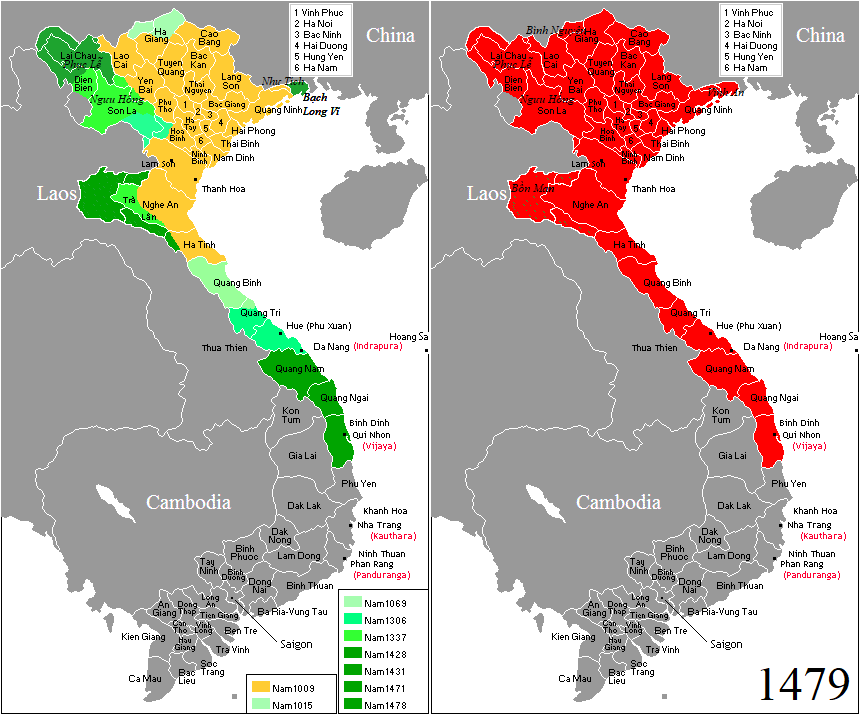
Territory of Đại Việt 1479 after Cham–Vietnamese War.

The Vietnamese ceramics trade was severely affected due to the impact suffered by the Cham merchants after the invasion. The Ming scholar Wu Pu (吳樸) recommended that to help stop the Vietnamese, Ming should help resuscitate the Champa Kingdom. The Ming dynasty however did not follow his recommendation, due to internal security concerns.

A massive wave of Cham emigration radiated out across Southeast Asia. In Cambodia, Cham refugees were welcomed, but the sources do not describe how they arrived in Cambodia and where they settled. In Thailand, there are records of Cham presence since the Ayudhaya period. In the Indonesian archipelago, the Sejarah Melayu (Malay Annals) relates that after the collapse of Vijaya in 1471, two Cham princes named Indera Berma Shah and Shah Palembang sought asylum in Melaka and Aceh. Shortly after his conversion to Islam, Indera Berma Shah was appointed minister at the court of Sultan Mansur Shah. The Sejarah Melayu also mentions Cham presence in Pahang and Kelantan, where the Kampung Laut Mosque is said to have been built by Champa sailors on their way to Java. Some refugees entered the territory of Sulu [which included Taguima/Basilan].

The Ming Empire sent a censor, Ch'en Chun, to Champa in 1474 to install the Champa King, but his entry was blocked by Vietnamese soldiers who had taken over Champa. He proceeded to Malacca instead and its ruler sent back tribute to the Ming dynasty. Malacca sent envoys again in 1481 to inform the Ming that, while going back to Malacca in 1469 from a trip to China, the Vietnamese attacked them, castrating the young and enslaving them. The Malaccans reported that Đại Việt was in control of Champa and sought to conquer Malacca, but the Malaccans did not fight back, due to a lack of permission from the Ming to engage in war. The Ming Emperor scolded them, ordering the Malaccans to strike back with violent force if the Vietnamese attacked.

However, as Đại Việt's power declined during the sixteenth century, the rise of the Burmese Empire under Tabinshweti and Bayinnaung to become the major force in mainland Southeast Asia had put an end to Vietnamese expansion.

More ethnic Vietnamese had moved south and settled on conquered Cham lands. Only the small Cham kingdom of Panduranga remained in the south. Having suffered a large number of population loss in a short period of time–though accurate figures are impossible to determine for lack of usable statistics–the Cham would never regain a significant power position until being fully annexed in the 19th century. Around 162,000 Cham remain in Vietnam today.

Several historians believe the 1471 Vietnamese attack on Champa and extraordinary violence against Cham civilians satisfies the modern definition of genocide as the mass-killings were systemically delivered with the aim of destroying a particular nation or group; in this case, the Cham people, who experienced an "inexorable demographic decline" as the most notable consequence of the conquest. Not only that, the sudden Cham population collapse recorded in the occupied regions was hastened by state-organized movements of settlers moving into and permanently eliminating the existing Cham society and replacing it with the society of the Vietnamese colonizers.

=== Subsequent Islamization of the Chams ===
It is generally believed that the Vietnamese conquest of Champa in 1471 had directly contributed to the eventual conversion to Islam by the majority of Cham population. Even before the Vietnamese conquest, Islam had already started to make ground in Champa by the 10th century, but only by this war that Islam finally hastily established the foothold among the Cham population; it was believed that in order to resist the increasingly aggressive Confucian-Buddhist Vietnamese expansion, conversion to Islam made it an important component of the Cham identity and to seek protection from the Islamic World (dar al-Islam) against Vietnamese aggression.
