= Po Binasuor =

- Raja-di-raja

King of Champa
- Reign: c. 1360–90
- Predecessor: Maha Sawa
- Successor: Jaya Simhavarman VI
- Born: Unknown; Vijaya, Champa
- Died: 1390; Luộc River, Đại Việt
- Issue: Chế Ma Nô Đà Nan; Chế Sơn Na; Unknown daughter
- House: 13th dynasty

Po Binasuor (died 1390), Ngo-ta Ngo-che, Cei Bunga, Chế Bồng Nga (chữ Hán: 制蓬峩, Bunga is the Malay word for 'flower', and "Chế" is the Vietnamese transliteration of Cei, a Cham word that means "uncle" - and was, in the days of Champa, frequently used to refer to generals) ruled Champa from 1360 to 1390 CE. He is different from Po Binnasuar, the king of Panduranga from 1316 to 1361.

Po Binasuor was the last strong king of the kingdom of Champa.

== Reign ==
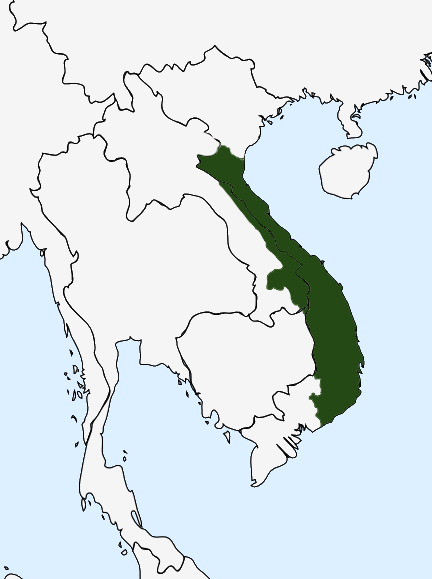
Cham empire at its peak during the reign of Po Binasuor in 1380s

Po Binasuor apparently managed to unite the Cham lands under his rule and by 1361 was strong enough to attack Đại Việt from the sea. In 1372 he sent a letter to the Hongwu Emperor of Ming China saying that Đại Việt was about to attack his country and demanding that the Ming send protection and war materiel. His Cham forces sacked the Vietnamese capital city of Thăng Long (modern Hanoi) four times, once in 1371, twice in 1377, and once in 1383. They set the city on fire and seized women, jewels, and silks. All Vietnamese books held in the royal palace were lost. The second attack followed the death of king Trần Duệ Tông after his failed assault on Vijaya. In 1378 he married Prince Trần Húc, a Vietnamese royal captive, to his daughter and put the prince in charge of the Cham army advance into Nghệ An. The Đại Việt court was unable to reassert power in the south due a lack of central control over manpower and resources, allowing Po Binasuor to recruit Vietnamese men from these southern regions for his army.

The Chams then forced Trần Phế Đế, the king of Đại Việt, to move the state's treasures and wealth to Thiên Kiến mountain and the Khả Lăng Caves in 1379. Po Binasuor continued to occupy the two southern Vietnamese provinces of Nghệ An and Thanh Hóa, though he was stopped by Hồ Quý Ly in 1380 and 1382. In 1390, Po Binasuor was finally stopped during another invasion of the capital, when his royal barge suffered a musketry salvo (shot by Jiaozhi arquebus).

== Family and children ==
Po Binasuor had only one Queen named Siti Zubaidah, belonging to the Kelantan clan. They had two sons and one daughter. The two princes defected to the Vietnamese after general Ko Cheng took the Cham crown.

== Legacy ==
Po Binasuor's invasion of Đại Việt revealed the weakness and inefficiency of the Trần dynasty. This eventually led to the demise of this dynasty.

== See also ==
- Champa
- King of Champa

Preceded by Maha Sawa (1342–1360)	King of Champa; 1360–1390	Succeeded by Jaya Simhavarman V (1390–1400)
