= Jaya Simhavarman VI =

- Raja-di-raja

King of Champa
- Reign: 1390–1400
- Predecessor: Po Binasuor
- Successor: Indravarman VI
- Born: Unknown; Champa
- Died: 1400; Champa
- Spouse: Parameśvarī
- Issue: Indravarman VI
Names
- Jaya Siṁhavarmadeva; Śrī Harijāti Virasinha Campapura
Regnal name
- Śrī Jayasiṁhavarmadeva
- House: Vr̥ṣu dynasty

Jaya Simhavarman VI, before as Ko Ceng or La Khai, was a king of Champa from 1390–1400. This general of Che Bong Nga's led the retreat back to Champa in 1390, following the death of Che Bong Nga by a musketry salvo. Back in Champa, he declared himself king, usurping the two sons of Che Bong Nga, Che Ma-no Da-nan and Che San-no.

During his reign, he abandoned most of the territory won by his predecessor, Che Bong Nga.

Preceded by Chế Bồng Nga 1360–1390	King of Champa; 1390–1400	Succeeded by Indravarman VI 1400–1441
