= Vijaya (Champa) =

Capital of the Kingdom of Champa

- ꨝꩊ ꨨꨊꨭꨥ (Bal Hanguw); Đồ Bàn
- Location within Vietnam
- 13.92869°N 109.07507°E
- Type: Former capital of Champa
- Location: Bình Định province, Central Vietnam

History
- Founded: Unknown
- Founder: Unknown

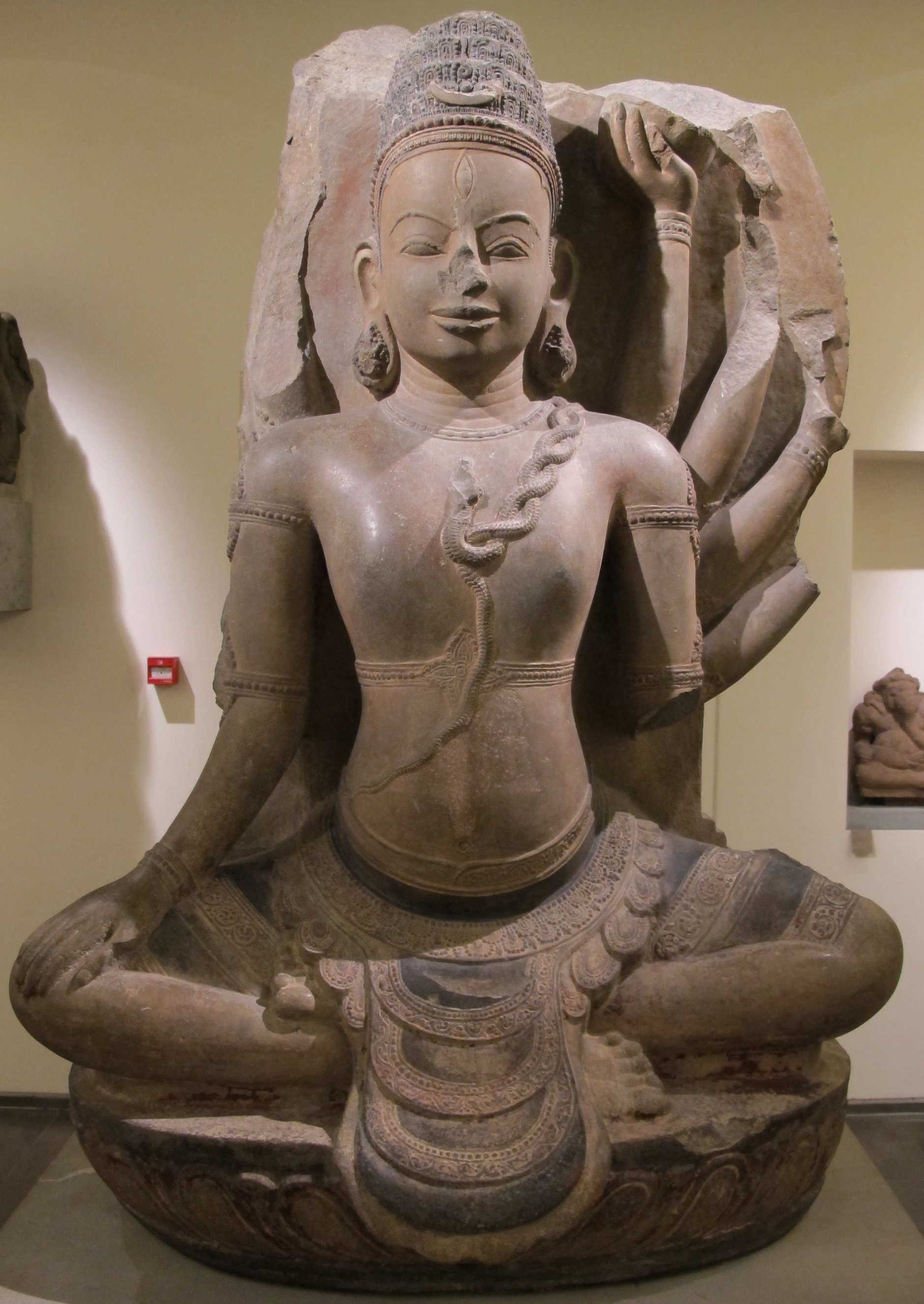
Statue of Shiva from Thap Banh It, Vijaya (now in Guimet Museum)

Vijaya (Sanskrit for "victorious" (Note: Sanskrit: विजय; Cham: ꨝꩊ ꨨꨊꨭꨥ, romanized: Bal Hanguw, Traditional Chinese: 尸唎皮奈, pinyin: Shīlì Pínài; Vietnamese: Thị Lợi Bi Nai; Chinese alt: 新州, pinyin: Xīnzhōu, lit. 'New Province'; Vietnamese alts: Đồ Bàn or Chà Bàn)), also known as Vijayapura, was the capital of the Kingdom of Champa located in modern-day An Nhơn, Bình Định province, Vietnam. It served as the capital of the Kingdom of Champa from 938 until it was conquered by Đại Việt during the Champa–Dai Viet War of 1471.

== History ==
The area around Vijaya was probably one of earliest landfalls of the Cham people in what is now Vietnam. However, its architecture implies that it did not become important until the 11th or 12th century. Records suggest that there was an attack on Vijaya's citadel from the Vietnamese in 1069 (when Dai Viet was ruled by Lý Nhân Tông) to punish Champa for armed raiding in Vietnam. The Cham king Rudravarman III was defeated and captured and offered Champa's three northern provinces to Dai Viet (present-day Quảng Bình and north of Quảng Trị provinces).

In Champa at the time there were two ruling kings–Parameśvaravarman and Rudravarman III–in Nha Trang and Phan Rang, respectively. Rudravarman of Phan Rang had good relation with the Chinese Song dynasty. None of them ever managed to travel far north to counter the Vietnamese. Northern Champa at that time was ruled by a Cham chief/warlord with title Śrī Yuvarāja Mahāsenāpati, not related to the Parameśvaravarman–Bhadravarman–Rudravarman family.

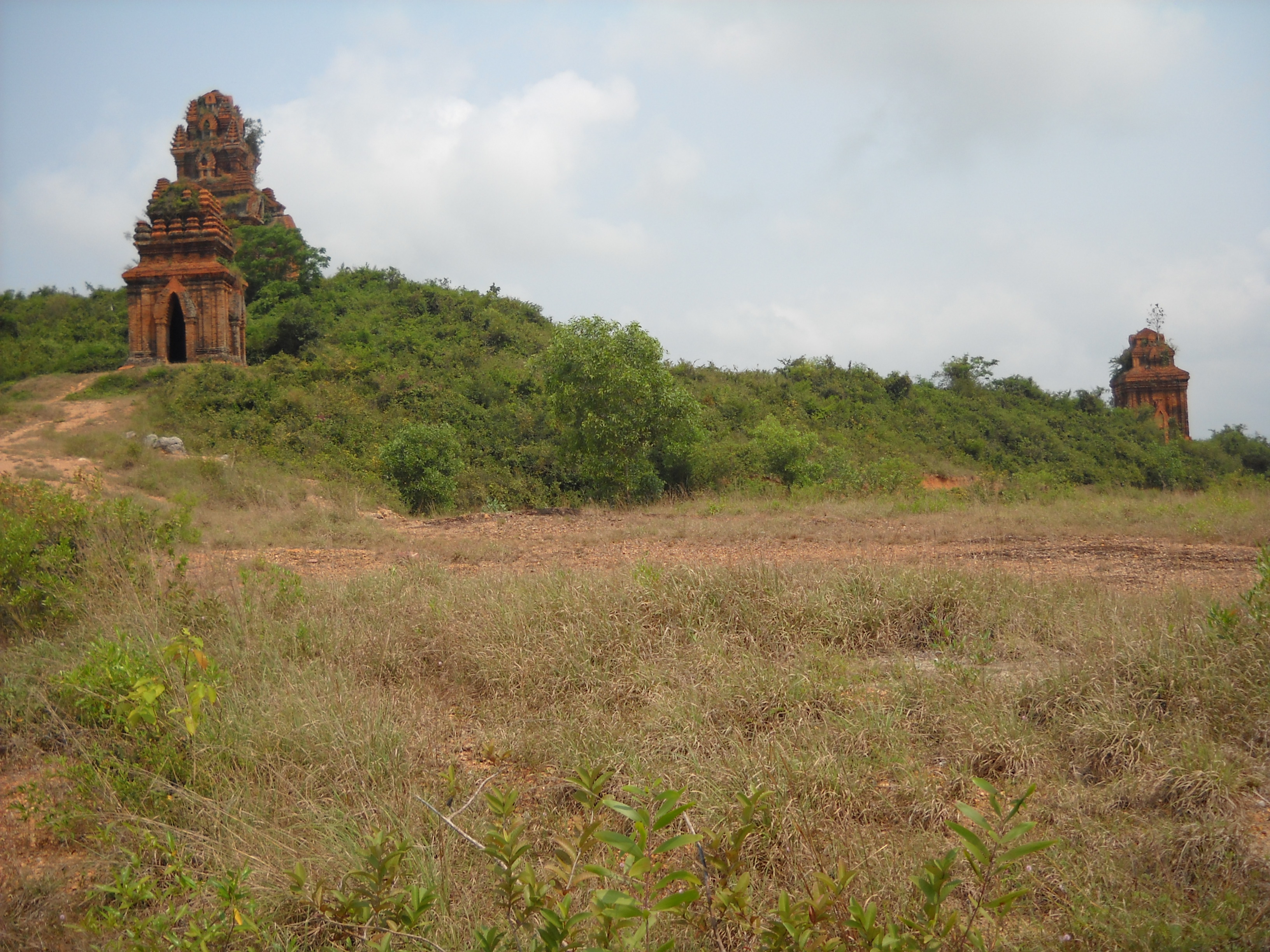
Modern-day remains of Vijaya

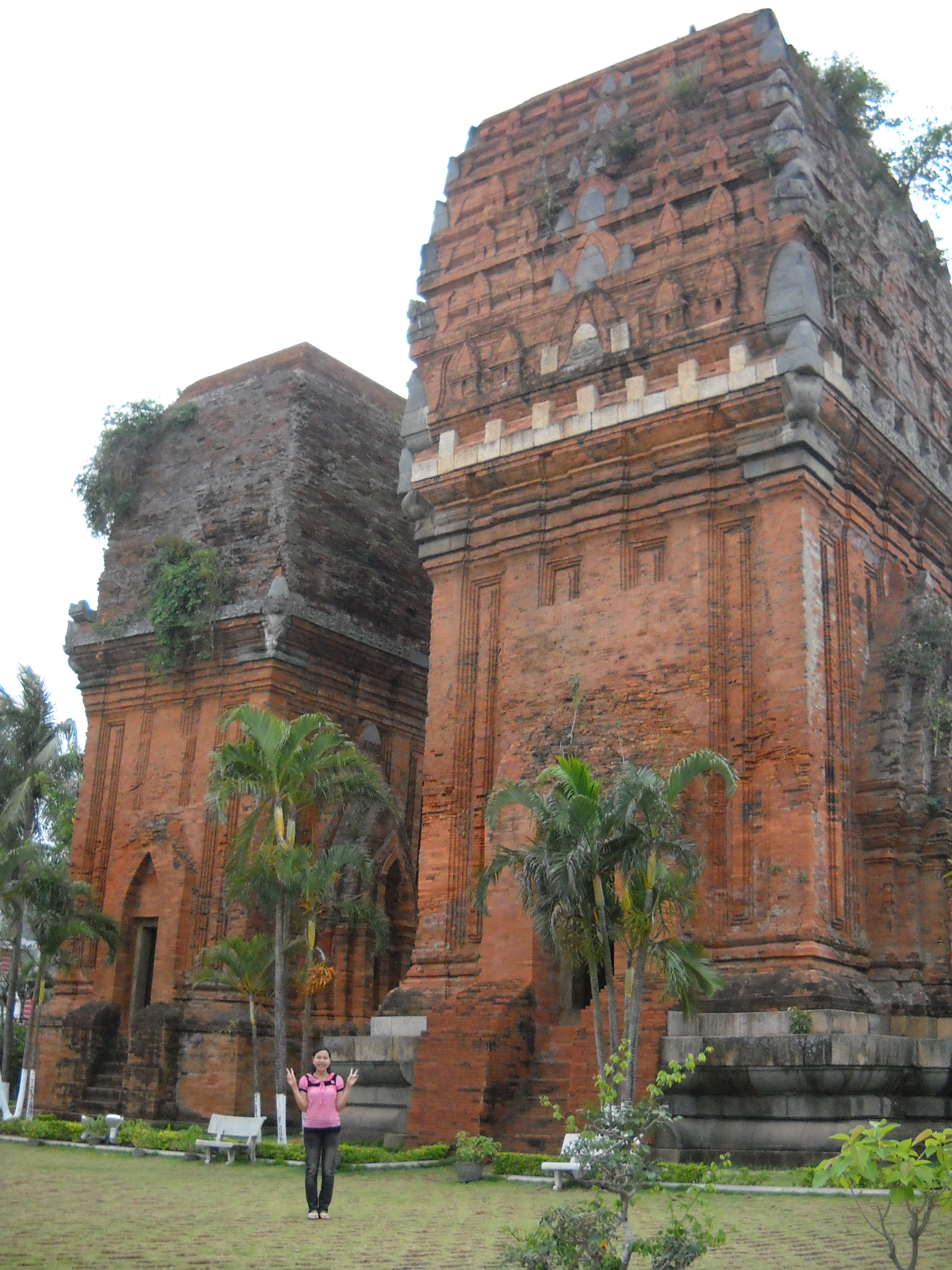
Hưng Thạnh tower of Vijaya.

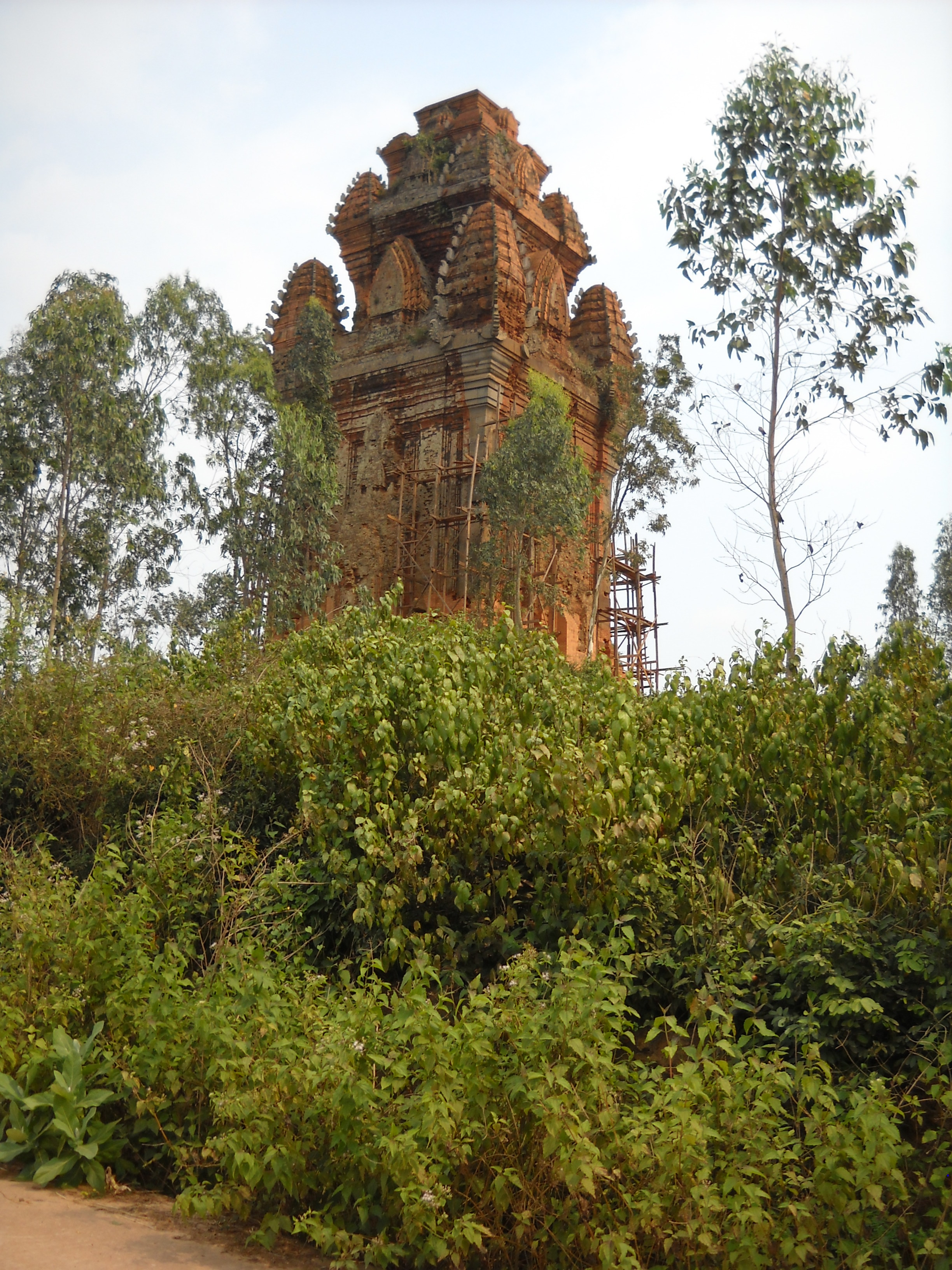
Cánh Tiên tower of Vijaya.

The Vietnamese raid in 1069 began embarking from a port in Huế on the 28th day of the third month, reached its destination of the third day of fourth month, then engaged with the Cham (although sailing from Huế to Vijaya (Qui Nhon) within six days doesn't make sense). King Ðệ Củ/Chế Củ had been fleeing into Cambodia (Zhenla), and was then captured. They pillaged the city of Indrapura (Phật thệ) for one month, then it took one month for them to return to Hanoi. Michael Vickery insists that the 1069 Vietnamese raid did not target Vijaya, but probably Châu Sa & Cổ Lũy citadels on the north and south banks of the Trà Khúc River in Quảng Ngãi province. Châu Sa was a large port city named Amaravati, has the temple of Chánh Lộ dating to eleventh century. He also speculates that Chế Củ was certainly not king Rudravarman III, but a Cham chief somewhere in the north. The earliest mention of Vijaya as a Cham city was dated to around 1153 to 1184, so the explicit application of Vijaya for a location of Champa prior that period should be considered an historical anachronism.

Vijaya was involved in wars with Angkor (now Cambodia) in the 12th and 13th centuries. Khmer military incursions into Champa were successful for some time and Suryavarman II managed to subdue Vijaya in the 1145, deposing Jaya Indravarman III, but the Khmer were later defeated in 1149. Vijaya was at times dominated by the Khmer king Jayavarman VII. The Khmer king relied on Cham supporters for his successful military campaigns in both Angkor and Champa.

Vijaya was captured by the Yuan army led by Mongol commander Sogetu in early 1283. The Mongols were ultimately driven away, but the city was sacked. In 1377, the city was unsuccessfully besieged by a Vietnamese army in the Battle of Vijaya. Major wars with Vietnam were fought again in the 15th century, which eventually led to the defeat of Vijaya and the demise of Champa in 1471. The citadel of Vijaya was besieged for one month in 1403 when the Vietnamese troops had to withdraw because of a shortage of food. The final attack came in early 1471 after almost 70 years without major military confrontation between Champa and Dai Viet. It is interpreted to have been a reaction to Champa asking China for reinforcements to attack Dai Viet. Much of Champa was dissolved after the 1471 Cham–Vietnamese War. Vijaya was completely destroyed, while other southern principalities had a protectorate-like status within Dai Viet.

== Geography ==
Vijaya was centred on the lowland area along lower Côn River, in what is now the south of Bình Định Province. To the east of the plain and near the estuary of the river is a strategic and well-protected location for a port. This led to the rise of Cảng Thị Nại, one of the major ports of Champa. The river leading up into the highlands to the west was important for the trade with highland peoples supplying Champa with luxury goods such as eaglewood for export. Vijaya's geography was also important for its agriculture. With one of the larger rivers of Champa, its soils were more fertile than that of many other places.

== Demographics ==
According to two noteworthy 15th century reports noted in the Vietnamese grand chronicles, Toàn thư, Vijaya had a small number of households, just 2,500, or approximately 10,000 inhabitants. More accurately, the second report states that the city had about 70,000 people living inside.

== Architecture ==
Vijaya's architecture distinguishes it from other Champa centers, because it used a combination of stone and brick elements, while most other Cham structures only used bricks. This suggests some influence from Cambodian Angkor. It also points to the relative abundance of labour in Vijaya compared to other Champa centres of powers, because processing stones for construction was more labour-intensive than the production of bricks. Vijaya's style of architecture seems to have been dominant throughout Champa for some time, given the later classification of the architecture from the period between the 12th and 14th centuries as the 'Binh Dinh style'.

== Remains ==
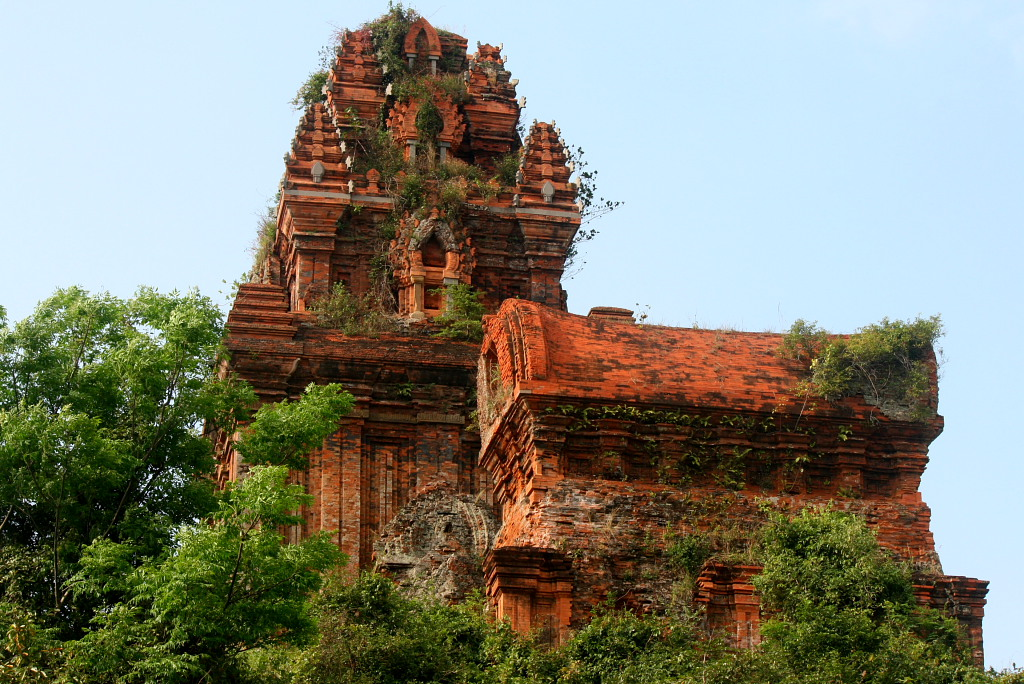
Banh It Towers

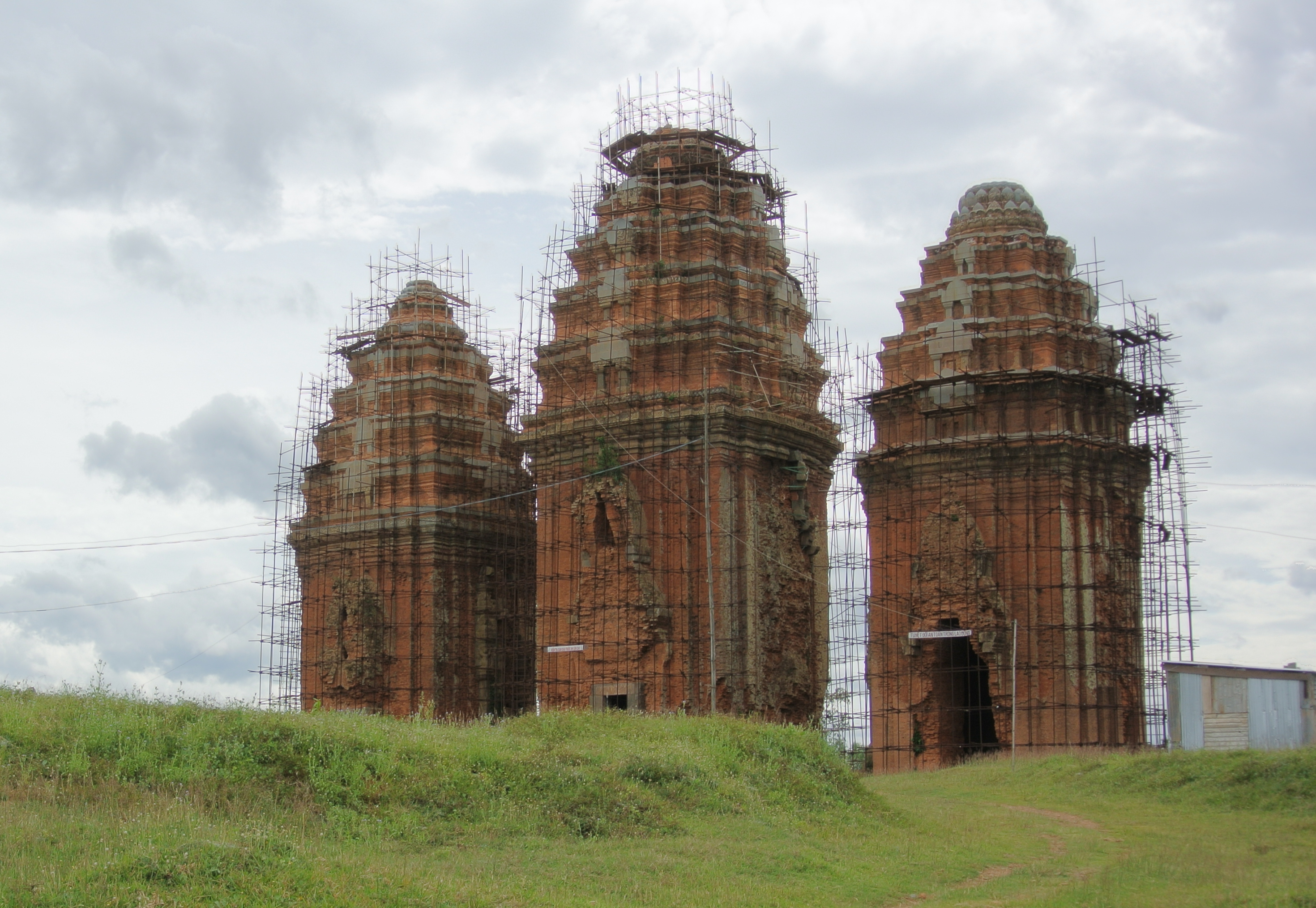
Duong Long Towers

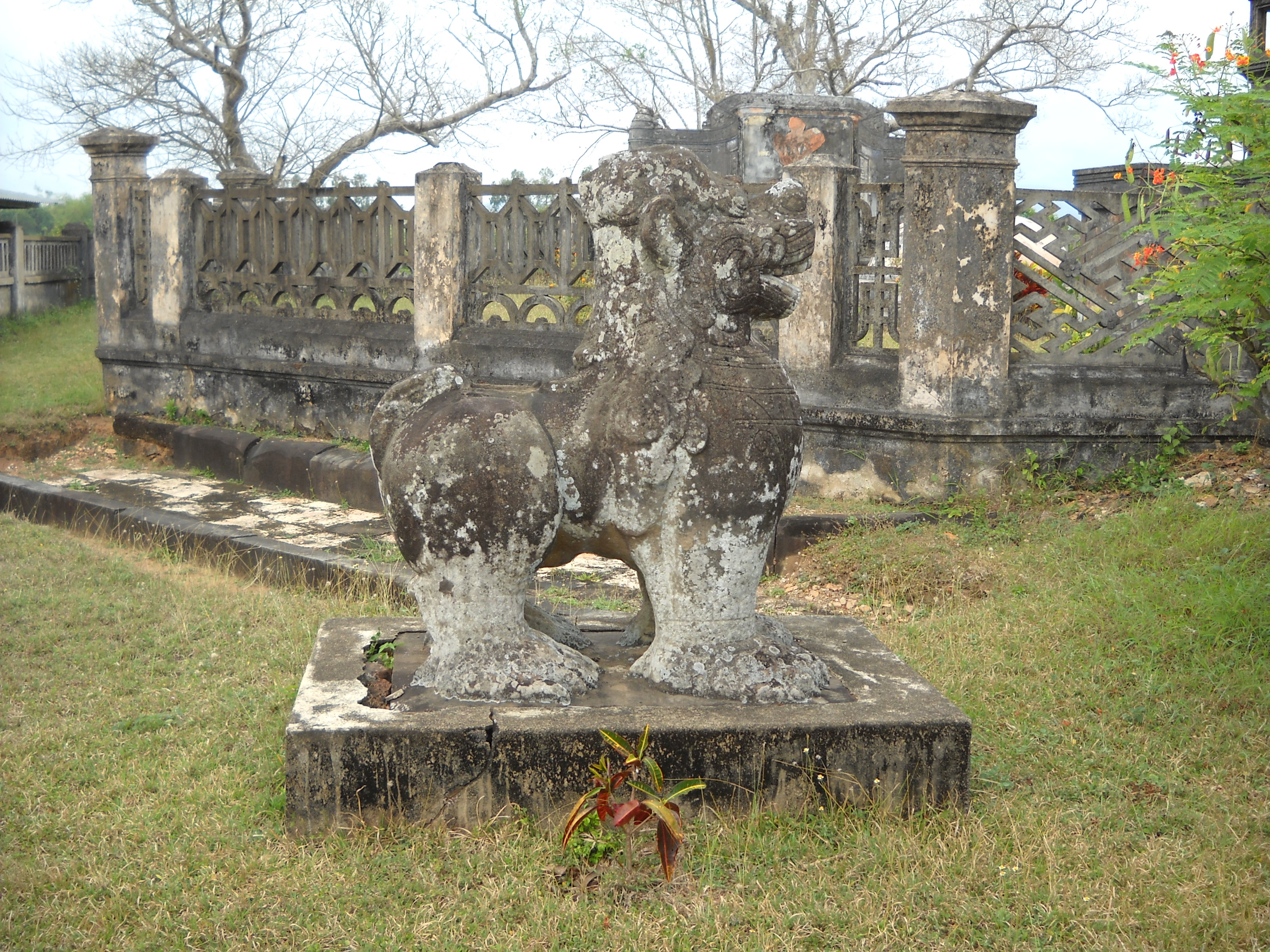
Lion statue of Champa at ruin of Vijaya palace.

A relatively large number of towers built in Vijaya have been preserved in Bình Định Province. They include the ruins of the citadel: Cánh Tiên tower and several temple towers. The Dương Long towers are among Southeast Asia's tallest Hinduist buildings.

Site	Date	Location
Dương Long	late 12th - early 13th century; improved up to 14th - 15th century (before 1471)	Bình Hoà, Tây Sơn
Hưng Thạnh / Tháp Đôi	late 12th - early 13th century	Đống Đa, Quy Nhơn
Cánh Tiên	late 13th - 14th/15th century	Nhơn Hậu, An Nhơn
Thốc Lốc / Phú Lốc	late 13th - 14th century	Bình Nghi, Tây Sơn
Thủ Thiện	late 13th - 14th century	Bình Nghi, Tây Sơn
Bình Lâm	early 11th century (c. 1000)	Phước Hoà, Tuy Phước
Bánh Ít / Tháp Bạc	early 11th century (c. 1000); improved later	Phước Hiệp, Tuy Phước

== Capital of Tây Sơn dynasty ==
The ruins of Tây Sơn era Hoang De citadel lies within the old Champa city walls.
