= Legendary Champa rulers =

The Legendary Champa rulers are said to have governed the Champa Kingdom in present-day Vietnam, and more specifically Panduranga in the far south from mythical times. They are exactly dated in the chronicles written down much later, but their historicity before the 17th century is debated.

== Background ==
Champa is famous as a Hindu civilization that dominated large parts of what is today Vietnam from the 7th century. While older historiography regarded Champa as a cohesive kingdom, newer research has revealed it as a complex of historical regions, from south to north Panduranga, Kauthara, Vijaya, Amaravati, and Indrapura. The Chinese and Vietnamese annals, and local inscriptions, mention a long list of dated rulers over the centuries, although there are also many obscure points. A ruler who was known as "King of Champa" in the sources would have been based in either of the five named regions, emerging as the temporarily most important ruler in the larger Champa territory. After the sack of the capital Vijaya in 1471 at the hands of the Vietnamese Lê Dynasty, half of Champa was lost to the invaders and the political centre moved to Panduranga in the south. For much of the 16th century, there are almost no contemporary historical sources; it is only towards the end of the century that more detailed data about events in Champa are found.

A set of Cham chronicles from the 19th century mentions 40 exactly dated kings from about 1000 to 1832. Some of them are also mentioned in the Mangbalai chronicle which gives cryptical and metaphorical characterizations of the various kings, and in various legendary accounts called dalukal. The names and dates of the kings before the 17th century cannot be confirmed from non-Cham sources and do not accord with the list of historical rulers known from inscriptions and annals. Early French scholars therefore drew the conclusion that the Cham king list had little historical value, or that the names were actually minor sub-rulers in Panduranga. Later researchers, such as Po Dharma, have argued that the Cham chronicles only provide a list of Kings of Panduranga and not necessarily the main rulers of Champa, so that the indigenous tradition merits further historical research.

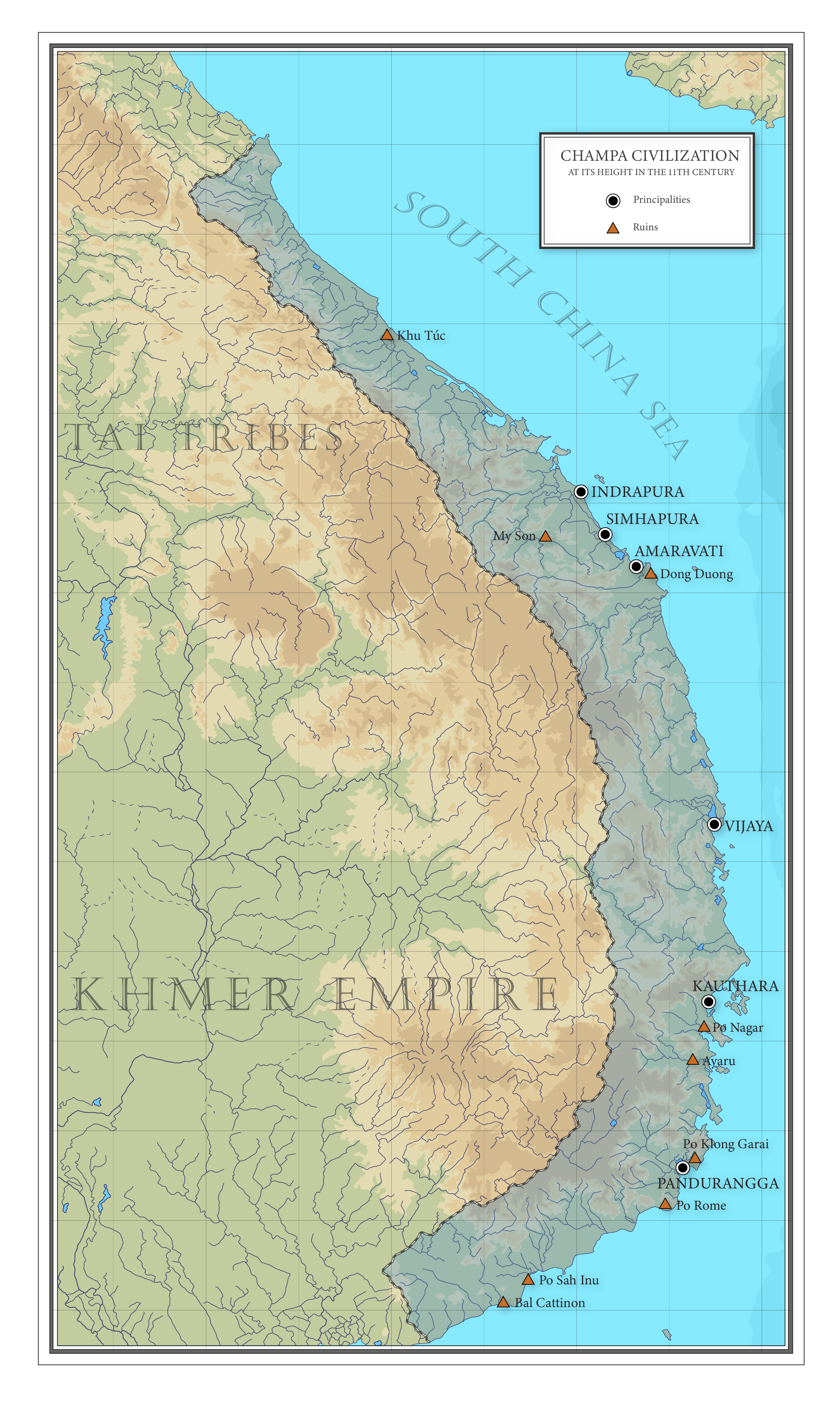
The five historical regions of Champa: Indrapura, Amaravati, Vijaya, Kauthara, and Panduranga.

== Po Uwaluah ==
The first king was, according to the chronicles, Po Uwaluah (1000–1036) who descended from Heaven and resided in Bal Sri Banây (Nai, Ninh Chu, Phan Rang). He acted with perfection, but the kingdom was still discontent with his rule. He confided his soul and body to the Lord of Heaven and went to reside in Mecca. Po Uwaluah eventually returned to the Cham kingdom to find a successor. He then returned to Heaven. In fact, his name is a Cham transcription of Allah and his appearance is due to Islamic influences in Cham culture since about the 16th century.

== Po Binnasuor ==
The next ruler Po Binnasuor (1036–1076), also known as Nasuor or Nasurlak, was “a man with the nature of fine grass”. Exactly what is meant by this is unclear, possibly that he was all-knowing. His residence was at Bal Sri Bânay, also called Bal Canar, “the fortified palace”, a name that was given to various historical capitals.

== Po Patik ==
Po Patik or Putik (1076–1114) was the third king, also ruling in Bal Sri Bânay. He had the “nature of divided grass and knotted grass”. During his time there was great warfare, although the chronicles do not specify against whom.

== Po Sulika ==
Po Sulika (1114–1151) now ascended the throne in Bal Sri Bânay. The cryptic Mangbalai chronicle says that he was of the “nature of divided grass. Then is seen a man falling.” The wider context of these words is unknown, although they may allude to serious inner divisions during his reign.

== Po Klaong Garay ==
The last purely mythical ruler was Po Klaong Garay (1151–1205). He was the son of a woman with magical powers, Po Sah Ina, who created the Cham agricultural rituals. However, other stories make Po Sah Ina the sister of a much later ruler, Po Kasit. Po Klaong Gara is also known as Tisundirai and is nicknamed the Leper King, since he was leprous in his youth. While the first four rulers are little more than names, Po Klaong Garay is a significant figure who is revered as one of the principal Cham deities. He was originally a buffalo caretaker called Ja Samang Ong who was elevated to the Cham throne, escorted by thousands of elephants. His royal destiny was demonstrated when two dragons appeared from the ground and licked his body (a similar story is told about the later king Po Rome). Po Klaong Garay first ruled in Bal Sri Banây but then moved the capital to Bal Hanguw. Scholars place this either in Huế or near the border of Krong Fa, Da Lat. He taught the Chams the art of making dams and irrigating the rice fields. He was a peaceful ruler who made the Khmers evacuate southern Champa without any shedding of blood after having overcome them in a contest. Another story, however, says that Po Klaong Garay defeated a combined attack by the Laow (Chinese) and Yuon (Vietnamese). He did not die a mundane death, but rather “returned to Heaven”.

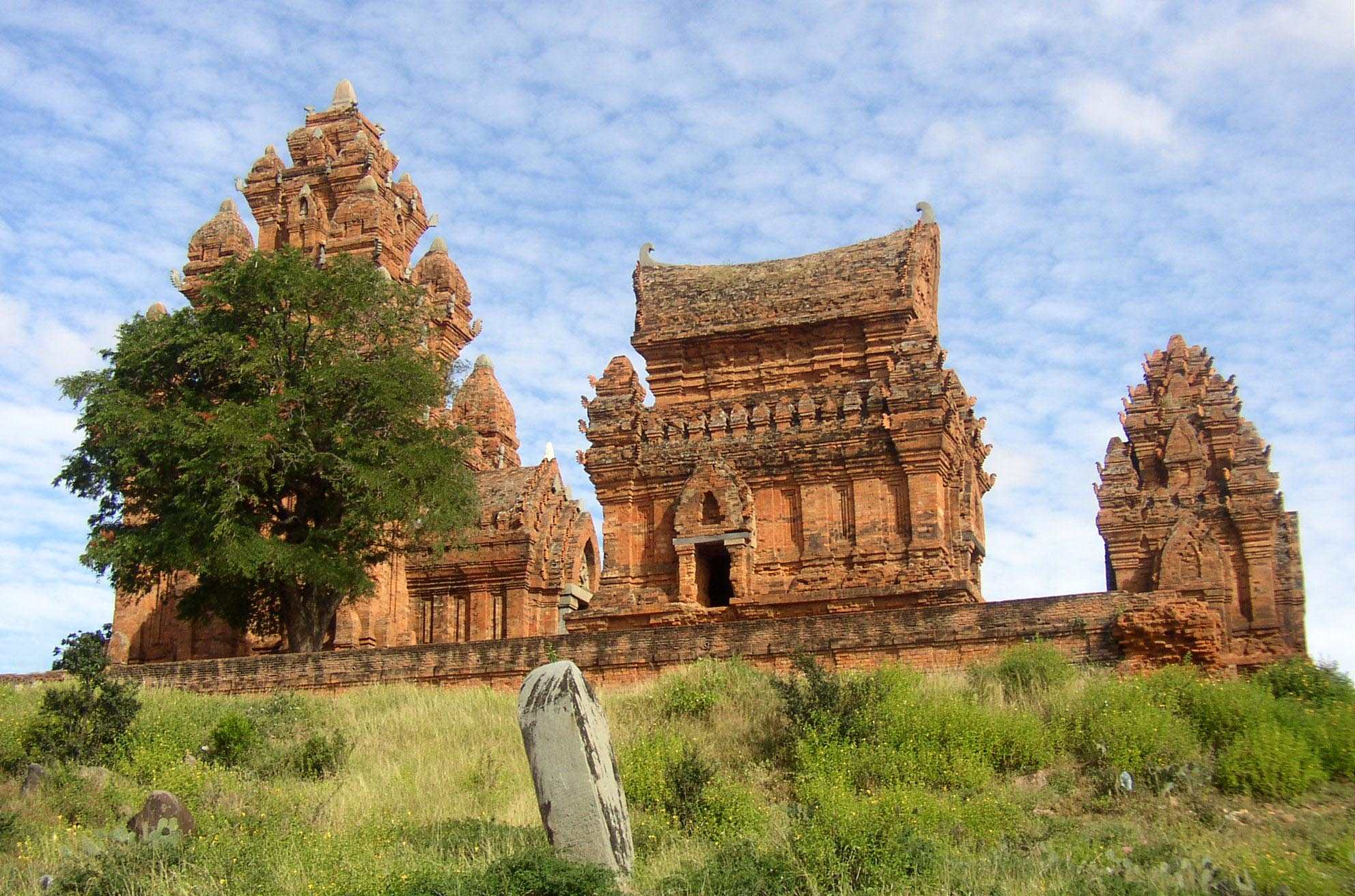
The Po Klaong Garay shrine, from c. 1300, traditionally associated with the king of the same name.

== Po Sri Agarang ==
The sixth ruler Po Sri Agarang (1205–1247) also reigned in Bal Hanguw. Nothing in particular is known about him except that he founded the first, albeit short-lived Cham dynasty. However, other traditions mention two other rulers after Po Klaong Garay, namely Tivak and Dibai. Po Dharma has suggested that the appearance of Agarang has to do with the flight of the historical Panduranga king Suryavarman in 1203, when the latter was defeated by the Cambodian ruler Jayavarman VII, although this must remain speculative.

== Cei Anak ==
Cei Anak (1247–1281) was the son of Po Sri Agarang and succeeded to the throne in Bal Hanguw. After some time he found a new capital, Bal Anguai. The exact location of this city remains a subject of scholarly debate. The International Office of Champa suggests it was around the Phan Rang area, while Étienne Aymonier proposes a site closer to Binh Dinh (historically known as Vijaya). Cei Anak once waged successful war against Cambodia, leading troops and elephants to conquer the Khmer lands. How long the Cham occupation lasted is not mentioned.

== Po Debatasuar ==
A new dynasty, solely consisting of three brothers, was founded by Po Debatasuar (1281–1306) who continued to reign from Bal Anguai. Another text says he resided in Gram Parik. In a Year of the Snake, the Vietnamese appeared with a fleet of junks and a troop of horsemen. However, their attack was repulsed and they had to return to Vietnam. Later, a new threat appeared in the form of the expansive Chinese. After subjugating Vietnam, they marched their troops to the Cham kingdom which they dominated for a period of twenty years. Finally, in a Year of the Horse, Champa was liberated after intense fighting. The tomb of Po Debatasuor is found in Phan Ri (Parik) where he is honoured under the name Yang In.

== Po Patarsuar ==
Po Debatasuar was succeeded by his uterine brother Po Patarsuar (1306–1328). There are no details about his reign, except that he reigned in Bal Anguai.

== Po Binnasuar ==
Po Binnasuar (1328–1373) was the uterine brother of his predecessor, and a great warrior. He was a handsome ruler who made a lasting impression. In a Year of the Snake, the Vietnamese invaded Champa and encircled the capital, which is here called Bal Suh. Po Binnasuar, however, sallied out and defeated the Viêt king, who had to return to his kingdom. The Vietnamese were massacred along the routes, their blood flooding the plains. At Bal Suh, their heads were arranged in mountain-high pyramids. After this grand victory, Po Binnasuar resolved to pursue the Vietnamese. At first the enterprise was crowned with overwhelming success. He took the Viêt king and subjugated Vietnam. Then, however, he obtained a consort there, which spelled his end as he was killed and beheaded. His body minus the head was taken back to Champa and buried in Boh Bariya in Phan Rang. His white cloths with gold edging were subsequently guarded day and night by the sexton of Boh Bariya. Some say that his head was preserved in a copper frame together with a shield and an old manuscript, at a place to the west of Phan Rang. Two chickens and five plates of rice were offered to the head twice per year to avoid illnesses. Po Binnasuar has often been identified with the historical ruler Chế Bồng Nga (c. 1360–1390) since the details of his exploits are rather similar. This has been denied by others who regard Po Binnasuar as a Panduranga ruler while Che Bong Nga ruled from Vijaya further to the north.

== Po Parican ==
After the violent end of Po Binnasuar, a new dynasty came to the throne with Po Parican (1373–1397). The Mangbalai chronicle likens him to a parakeet who harboured pretensions but lacked ability to act. Cambodians, Chinese, Vietnamese, and Takan (unidentified tribe) invaded in masses so that Champa was ruined. The capital Bal Anguai was conquered by the Vietnamese and disorder reigned. The description appears to refer to the fall of Vijaya which actually took place in 1471. The victorious Vietnamese ruler captured a daughter of Parican called Po Sah Ina, with whom he had a son Cau An. She is the subject of a long legend about her adventurous return to Champa, simultaneously with her brother Po Kasit's elevation as the new Cham ruler.

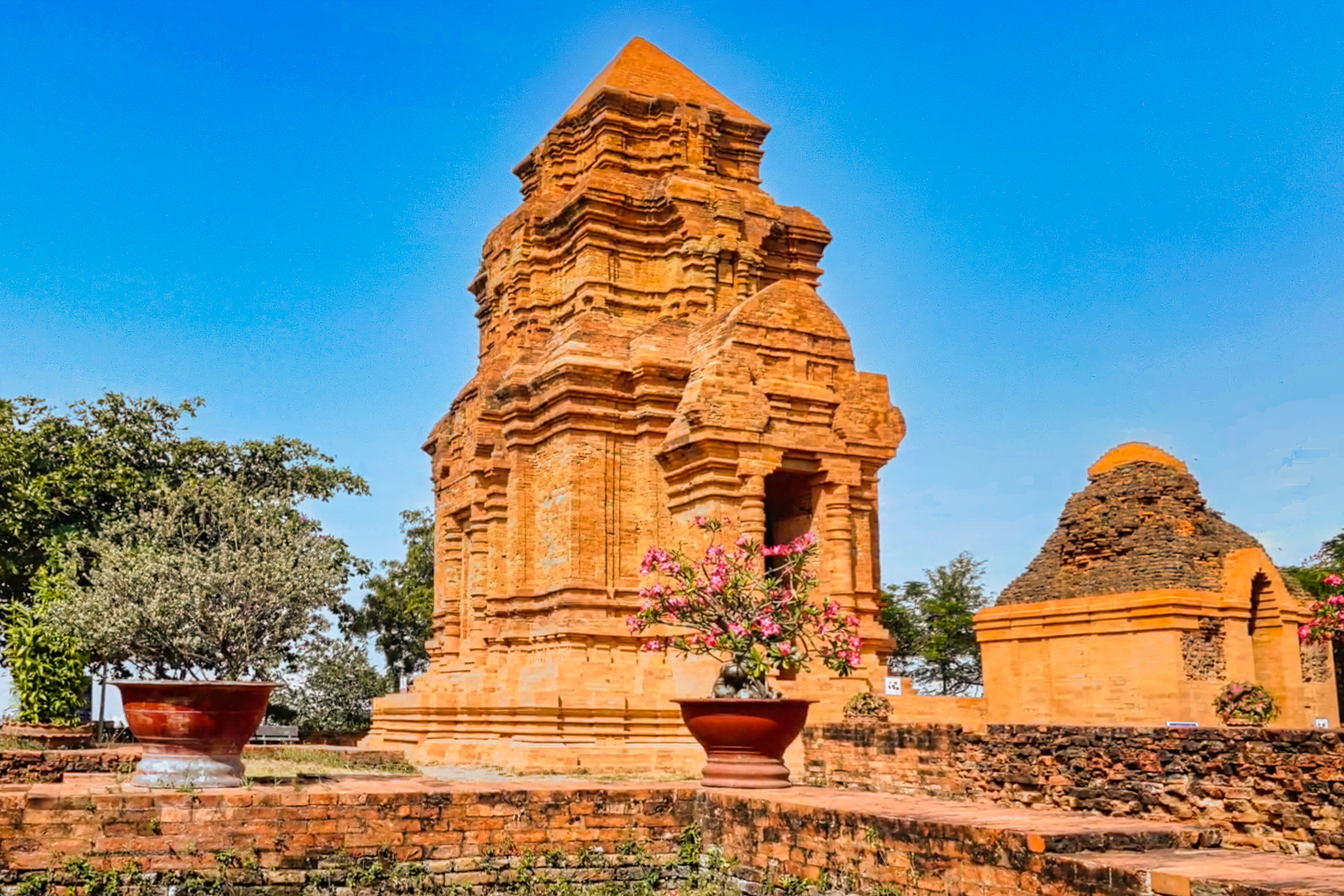
The Po Sah Inu (Ina) towers in Phan Thiết, built in the 7th or 8th century and associated with Po Sah Ina. She is the subject of various incompatible legends and myths, one making her the daughter of Shiva and the goddess Po Nagar.

== Po Kasit ==
After an extended interregnum (1397–1433), a son of Po Parican by the name of Po Kasit (also spelt Po Kathit or Kathik) was able to restore the kingdom and ruled from 1433 to 1460. He only agreed to be enthroned once his sister Po Sah Ina had been lured back to Champa. The offended Lê ruler sent an army against Champa, but all the Vietnamese soldiers were drowned due to a trap set up by Po Kasit. The Lê ruler, disguised as a beggar and accompanied by his son Cau An, subsequently visited the grand citadel constructed by Po Kasit in order to defend the realm. However, frightened by the hydraulic device that defended the citadel, he hurried back to Vietnam while leaving his son with his mother Po Sah Ina. Having returned home, the Lê ruler abdicated, and the Vietnamese were thereafter busy for a long time, quarrelling about the succession. As for Po Kasit, he established a new capital in Byuh Bal Batsinang (Batthinang) which has been identified as Cham Phu Nhuan village, Phan Rang, in the southernmost region Panduranga. Po Kasit was however not entirely keenly remembered by posterity. The Mangbalai chronicle says: “Then is seen a man with the aspect of a tall woman, however with a manly grace. The people did not obey him voluntarily.” From Chinese and Vietnamese sources it is known that a series of Cham kings reestablished a kingdom in Panduranga after 1471 under troubled conditions: Bố Trì Trì, Zhai Ya Ma Wu An, Gu Lai. However, none of these names resemble Po Kasit.

== Po Kabrah ==
Po Kasit was succeeded by his son Po Kabrah (1460–1494). He, too, was not remembered as a successful ruler. To quote the Mangbalai chronicle: “Subsequently is seen a man comparable to a wader who all the time hides in every bay, every pond. The people did not obey him voluntarily”. This is interpreted as his position as an impoverished ruler who was devoted to fishing and whose mores displeased the people. He married a Muslim woman, signifying that Islam made an impact in Champa after the fall of the old Vijaya-based kingdom.

== Po Kabih ==
Po Kabih (1494–1530), or Kabih Kunarai, was the uterine brother of Po Kabrah. Unlike his predecessors, he was a redoubtable ruler, as expressed by the chronicle: “Then is seen a man with the aspect of a bull, large, tall, enormous, and with a male beauty, always sharpening his horns and preparing for battle.” He was feared by the Vietnamese, and was even characterized as the only Cham ruler they never dared attack. From other sources it is known that the Vietnamese were occupied by internal wars during much of the 16th century, which gave Champa a respite from attacks from the northern neighbour.

== Po Karutdrak ==
The next ruler Po Karutdrak (1530–1536) is mentioned as either a brother or son of his predecessor. He was also known as Po Kabut. Very little is told about him, except that he was likened to a stilt-legged bird and was not voluntarily obeyed by the population. He was the last ruling member of Po Parican's dynasty.

== Po Maho Sarak ==
A new ruling lineage was established by Po Maho Sarak (1536–1541). His reign was however not an improvement of the situation, since he was likened to a gluttonous raven who ate good as well as unsavoury food and degraded the Champa kingdom. The population did not listen to him. He was buried in Palei Careh in the vicinity of Parik (Phan Ri).

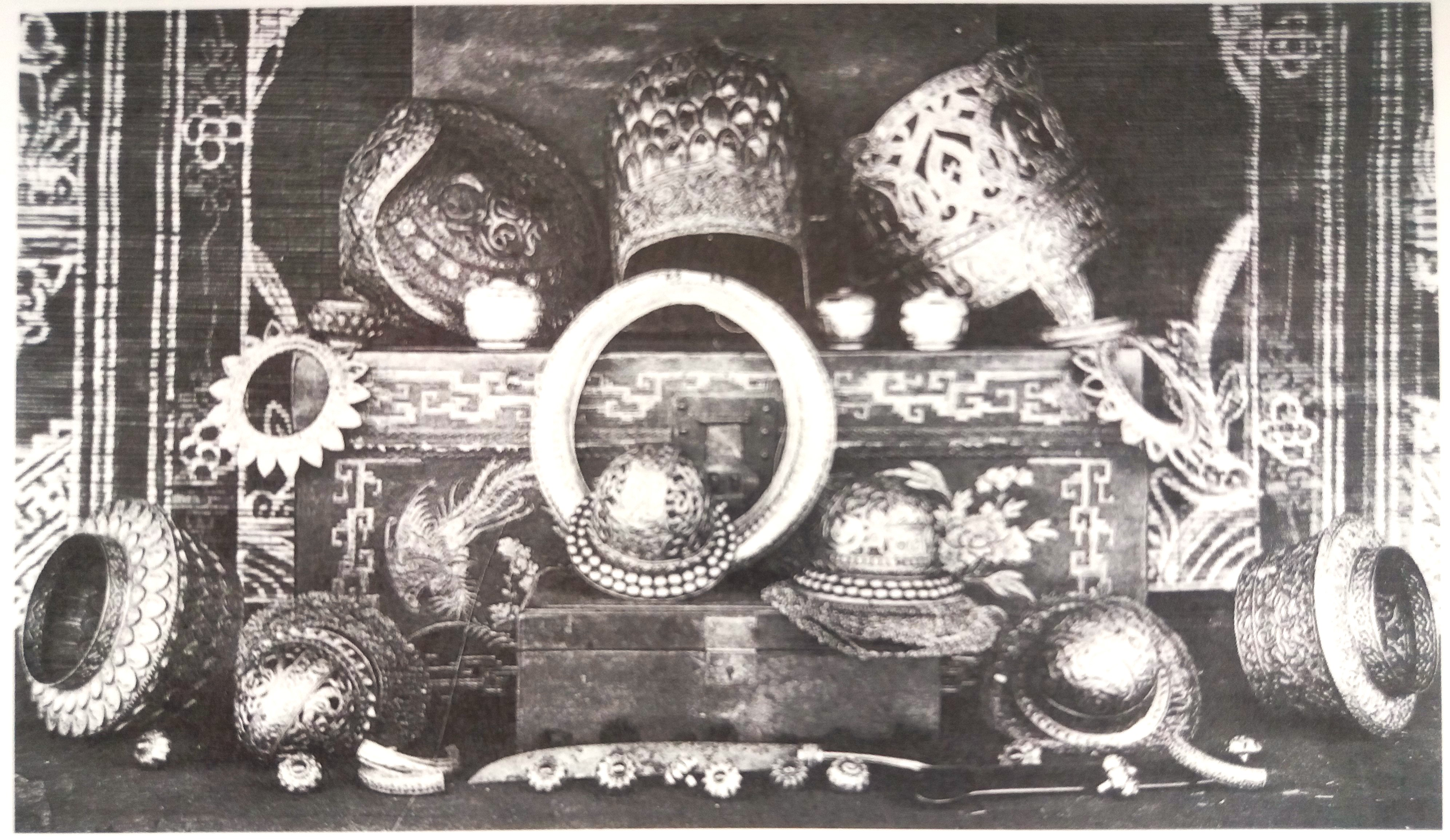
The treasure of the Cham kings: tiaras, bracelets, jewelry and other objects. Photograph from around 1900.

== Po Kunarai ==
Po Kunarai (1541–1553) succeeded his brother as ruler in Byuh Bal Batsinang. Nothing in particular is told about him. It is possible that a new king in fact came to the throne in the early 1540s since Chinese sources mention a Champa ruler Sha Ri Di Zhai as sending tribute to the Ming court in 1543.

== Po At ==
The last king of Byuh Bal Batsinang was Po At (1553–1579), the grandson (or nephew) of Po Kunarai. He was born in a Year of the Rat (1529, 1541, etc.). The Mangbalai chronicle says that he was “comparable to the rain, to the tempest, handsome, large, very beautiful, knowing until the end to choose, emplace, and maintain.” Other traditions, however, characterize Po At as wicked, mendacious, puerile and foolishly vain. He even spread the rumour that the Vietnamese had suffered defeat after defeat, although Champa and Vietnam were at peace at the moment. He left his residence Byuh Bal Batsinang and spent his time elsewhere, for unexplained reasons. External sources for this period of Champa's history are still very rare, but a Vietnamese chronicle mentions a Cham incursion over the border in 1578.

== Po Klaong Halau ==
Po Klaong Halau (1579–1603) replaced the short-lived Po Maho Sarak dynasty and founded a new lineage that ruled in Phan Rang and Phan Ri until 1622. From the late 16th century, external European and Asian sources about Champa become more common, and some details about Po Klaong Halau and his successors seem to be confirmed by other texts.

== Malay traditions about Champa kings ==
The Malay Annals, compiled in the 17th century, contain a pedigree of Champa kings which is quite different from the Cham traditions. It begins with the tale of Pau Glang who was born from the blossom of an areca palm and raised by the Raja of Champa who resided in the city of Malapatata and gave him his daughter Pau Bia in marriage. In due time he succeeded to the throne and subsequently built a huge city called Yak, corresponding to Vijaya. Pau Glang's son and successor was Pau Tri who married Bia Suri and sired Pau Gma who took the throne after his father. Pau Gma undertook a journey to the Javanese empire Majapahit to pay homage. The Javanese ruler gave him his daughter Radin Galoh Ajang. When Pau Gma returned to Champa, however, his father-in-law insisted that the princess should stay with him in Majapahit. After the Cham king had departed, Radin Galoh Ajang bore a child by the name Raja Jakanak who was raised in Majapahit. At a later time he built a fleet and sailed to Champa to meet his father, who made him his successor. Raja Jakanak married Pau Ji Bat Ji and had a son called Pau Kubah. In due time, Pau Kubah became king of Champa and married with Pau Mechat. The couple had several children, including a daughter who was desired by the Vietnamese ruler. Since Pau Kubah refused to agree to the marriage, the ruler took offence and invaded Champa. Eventually the treacherous Treasurer of Champa arranged for the gates of Yak to be opened, and the city was stormed by the Vietnamese. Pau Kubah was killed and his children scattered. Two of them, Indra Berma Shah and Shah Palembang, made it to Melaka and Aceh, respectively. The Sultan of Melaka, Mansur Shah (1459–1477), received Indra Berma well and made him convert to Islam. He became a highly appreciated minister of Mansur Shah, and his presence was the origin of the Cham community in Melaka.

== Javanese traditions about Putri Cempa ==
The royal family of Champa (Cempa) is the subject of a set of Javanese legends about the introduction of Islam in the island world. According to the chronicles, the legendary last king of Majapahit, Brawijaya, sent his minister Gajah Mada to Champa to ask for the daughter of the king, Darawati, in marriage. Consent was readily given, and the princess, known as Putri Cempa (the Champa princess), safely made it to Java. She is associated with a grave preserved in the old capital of the realm, which carries the Śaka date 1370 (AD 1448). The other daughter of the Champa ruler married an overseas Muslim from the lands to the west, Brahim Asmara, who managed to convert the king and his subjects to Islam. When the old King of Champa died, he was succeeded by his unnamed son. Meanwhile, Brahim Asmara and his wife had two sons called Ngali Murtala and Raden Rahmat (alias Sunan Ampel, traditional dates 1401-1481). When they grew up, the two brothers, together with their cousin, the Cham prince Raden Burereh, traveled to Java to visit their aunt Putri Cempa. However, during their absence the King of Koci (Giao Chỉ, i.e., Vietnam) conquered Champa. The three visitors therefore stayed in Java, and Sunan Ampel became one of the nine revered Muslim saints, walisongo, who disseminated Islam on the island. His two sons and grandson were also among the walisongo.

== See also ==
- King of Champa
- History of Champa
- Panduranga (Champa)
