= Jayavarman Mafoungnan =

King of Champa (d. 1478)

Jayavarman (Zhai Ya Ma Wu An)
- King of Champa; King of Panduranga

King of Champa
- Reign: ?-1478
- Predecessor: Bố Trì Trì
- Successor: Gu Lai
- Born: ? Champa
- Died: 1478; Panduranga, Champa
- Religion: Hinduism

Jayavarman, in Chinese transcription Zhai Ya Ma Wu An or Tchai-ya Ma-fou-ngan (Chinese: 齋亞麻弗菴, ? - died 1478), was a King of Panduranga in Champa. He was one of several Cham princes who appeared as rulers in the years after the fall of the Cham capital Vijaya to the Vietnamese in 1471. His name in the Chinese texts can likely be restored as Jayavarman.

== Establishment in Panduranga ==
The political conditions in Champa after the fall of Vijaya appear to have been highly volatile. A general of the last king Maha Sajan, Bố Trì Trì fled to Panduranga in the south and was established as ruler of Champa there, being acknowledged as vassal by the Vietnamese Emperor Lê Thánh Tông. Two other vassal rulers were installed in portions of the old Champa, in Hoa Anh and Nam Bàn. Bố Trì Trì is only mentioned in Vietnamese sources. Chinese sources of the Ming Dynasty, on the other hand, say that a brother of the last king, Pan Luo Cha Yue (Bàn La Trà Toại) fled to the mountains after the carnage and requested Chinese recognition as the new King of Champa in 1472. However, he was soon captured by Vietnamese troops, and the Lê court instead approached the prince Zhai Ya Ma Wu An or Jayavarman, who had been hiding in the mountain forests with his brother Gu Lai, and made him ruler in the far south. Whether he is the same person as Bố Trì Trì is unknown. He is described as the grandson (or nephew) of the old king. Lê Thánh Tông gave him five regions of the old Champa territory to rule, from Panduranga to the border to Cambodia. Ming envoys set out to give him an imperial seal and enfeoffment in 1478. However, when they arrived to Guangdong they heard that Zhai Ya Ma Wu An had died. Cham persons told the envoys that the king had been murdered by his own brother Gu Lai after he had requested Chinese enfeoffment. Others said he died of illness. The following years present a confusing picture where a certain Vietnam-backed pretender called Ti Po Tai (Devata?) contested the succession of Gu Lai.

== Cham sources ==
No Jayavarman (or similar) is mentioned in indigenous Cham sources, which give a long list of dated Panduranga rulers. They say that a king called Po Parican (r. 1373–1397) faced devastating attacks by Vietnamese and other peoples, so that the kingdom was lost and the capital taken by the Vietnamese. This was followed by a long interregnum from 1397 to 1433, after which Po Parican's son Po Kasit managed to found a new capital in Byuh Bal Battsinang (Cham Phu Nhuan village, Phan Rang) in Panduranga. He was not entirely successful since a chronicle notes that "the people did not obey him voluntarily". Whether Po Kasit (r. 1433–1460) is misdated and identical with any of the early Panduranga kings mentioned in Vietnamese and Chinese sources is not clear. He was, according to the late chronicles, succeeded by his three sons Po Kabrah (r. 1460–1494), Po Kabih (r. 1494–1530) and Po Karutdrak (r. 1530–1536) after which his dynasty came to an end.

Preceded by Bố Trì Trì 1471-?	Champa rulers 1470s–1478	Succeeded by Gu Lai 1478-1505
