= Sha Ri Di Zhai =

King of Champa (d. post 1543)

- King of Champa; King of Panduranga

King of Champa
- Reign: fl. 1543
- Predecessor: ?Sha Gu Bu Luo
- Successor: ?Po At
- Born: Champa
- Died: after 1543; Panduranga, Champa
- Religion: Hinduism

Sha Ri Di Zhai 沙日底齋 (died after 1543) is the Chinese transcription of the name of a King of Panduranga in Champa. He is known from a Chinese source as ruling in 1543.

== Tribute relations with Ming China ==
Champa was decisively defeated by the Vietnamese Lê Dynasty in 1471 and lost the northern half of its territory. Over the following decades an (alleged) branch of the old Cham royal family established a new base in Panduranga in the far south. The new kingdom also included Kauthara, south of Phú Yên. The Cham kings were careful to seek formal enfeoffment from the Ming Dynasty in China, in order to gain diplomatic assistance against the Vietnamese. However, the Cham embassies to the Ming court became rarer over time. After more than twenty years of diplomatic silence, the envoy Sha Bu Deng Gu Lu appeared in 1543 to offer tribute to the Jiajing Emperor. He was the uncle of the current ruler Sha Ri Di Zhai. He related to the Chinese that his country was repeatedly attacked by Vietnam and that the roads were consequently blocked. He therefore asked that Chinese officials escort him back to Champa, which was approved. The unreliable but sometimes well-informed Portuguese author Fernão Mendes Pinto also relates in his work Peregrinação that the ruler of Cochin(-china) attacked the King of Champa in c. 1542. Vietnamese chronicles, on the other hand, are silent about warfare with Champa in this period, as the Vietnamese elite was occupied with a civil war between the Lê and Mạc dynasties. They only say that the Chams made an incursion over the border to plunder in the Tuy Viễn district in 1578. As a consequence, Việt villages were established in the far south to guard the border.

Fernão Mendes Pinto is almost the only European source to give details about Champa in this period. He alleges that he visited the coastal region in 1540 and that the king resided in an upriver city called Pilaucacem where much commerce took place. Merchants arrived from Laos and the unidentified highland peoples Pafuas and Gueos. Trade relations with Siam are likewise mentioned by Pinto. However, the Chams were also occasionally pirates who colluded with sea rovers from Luzon, Java and Brunei.

== The Po Maho Sarak Dynasty in Cham tradition ==
A name similar to Sha Ri Di Zhai (also spelt Sha Ri Di Qi) is not known from other sources. Indigenous Cham historical traditions, written down much later, mention the Po Maho Sarak Dynasty that supposedly ruled in the mid decades of the 16th century. After the demise of the last member of the preceding dynasty, Po Karutdrak (1530–1536), who was disobeyed by the people, Po Maho Sarak founded a new ruling house and reigned in 1536–1541. He was however unable to remedy the situation; he was considered an unattractive figure who brought the kingdom into decline and to whom people did not listen. His brother and successor was Po Kunarai (1541–1553) about whom nothing in particular is told. The latter's grandson Po At (1553–1579), who ended the dynasty, is described as an attractive but also wicked, mendacious and foolishly vain figure who left (fled from?) his capital Byuh Bal Batsinang (near Phan Rang) and was eventually replaced by the Po Klaong Halau Dynasty.

Preceded by Sha Gu Bu Luo 1505-? (latest known ruler)	Champa rulers fl. 1543	Succeeded by ?Po At 1553-1579
