= Sha Gu Bu Luo =

King of Champa (d. after 1521)

- King of Champa; King of Panduranga

King of Champa
- Reign: 1505-after 1521
- Predecessor: Gu Lai
- Successor: Sha Ri Di Zhai?
- Born: Champa
- Died: after 1521; Panduranga, Champa
- Father: Gu Lai
- Religion: Hinduism

Sha Gu Bu Luo 沙古卜洛 (died after 1521) is the Chinese transcription of the name of a King of Panduranga in Champa. He ruled from 1505 to an unknown date after 1521. He is only known from Chinese, and to an extent European sources, and there is relatively little information about him.

== Establishment as ruler ==
Sha Gu Bu Luo was the son of the previous ruler Gu Lai. He had at least one brother, Kusuma, who was killed in action by Vietnamese forces. Gu Lai had a troubled reign as he was forced by Vietnamese invaders to flee to China for a while. Back in Champa, he felt his faculties declining by the late 1490s. Since friendship and formal tributary relations with China were important for the survival of the remaining Cham territory, he sent a request to the Ming court in 1499, asking the Emperor to enfeoff his son Sha Gu Bu Luo. As he wrote, Quy Nhon (meaning northern Champa) was still in the hands of Vietnam, and there were continuous disturbances. Considering his old age he therefore wished to abdicate in favour of his son, so that he could protect the country. However, the Ming Emperor did not agree to this, since the old king was still alive. Six years later, in 1505, Gu Lai reportedly died, and a new embassy was sent to China. Sha Gu Bu Luo wanted to be enfeoffed as ruler of Champa including the Quy Nhon region that had been taken by Vietnam in 1471. The Chinese, however, would not take action to recover the old Cham lands for the king, since previous attempts to put pressure on Vietnam had been useless. Sha Gu Bu Luo continued to send envoys to China, but it was only in 1515 that the Ming court sent enfeoffment credentials to him. New exchanges followed in 1520 and 1521. How long he reigned after that is not known. The next named King of Champa appears in 1543.

== Indigenous traditions about early Panduranga ==
Indigenous Cham chronicles were written much later and are difficult to compare with centemporary Chinese data. The names and dates of the Kings of Panduranga in the two source categories do not accord. The Cham texts mention that the defeat and capture of the Cham capital at the hands of the Vietnamese was followed by an interregnum that is dated in 1397–1433. Finally a son of the last ruler, Po Kasit (or Po Kathit) managed to establish a new capital in Byuh Bal Batsinang (or Batthinang) in Panduranga, ruling in 1433–1460. He had however difficulties in making himself obeyed, and the same problem affected his son and successor Po Kabrah (1460–1494). It was only the latter's brother Po Kabih (1494–1530) who was prestigious enough to deter the Vietnamese from attacking Panduranga.

== European accounts ==
Portuguese seafarers were established in Southeast Asia after 1511 and wrote geographical accounts that mention Champa. The most detailed is the Suma Oriental by Tomé Pires (c. 1515) which mentions Champa as sizeable land that produced rice, meat and other foodstuff. The chief merchandise was, however, Calambac (Agarwood). Imports included South Asian textiles and spices, and much gold originated from Minangkabau in Sumatra. The Cham trading vessels mostly went to Siam and all the way to Pahang but seldom visited Melaka. The king of the country is described as a "heathen" (i.e., Hindu) who was a wealthy man and waged war with other kings in the region, especially the one in Vietnam. Interestingly, Pires says there were no Muslims in the country, in stark contrast with the situation in the late 16th century.

Preceded by Gu Lai 1478-1505	Champa rulers 1505–after 1521	Succeeded by ?Sha Ri Di Zhai fl. 1543
