= Panduranga (Champa) =

Historical kingdom in Vietnam

Champa Pāṇḍuraṅga Paṅrauṅ / Panrāṅ
- 757–1693
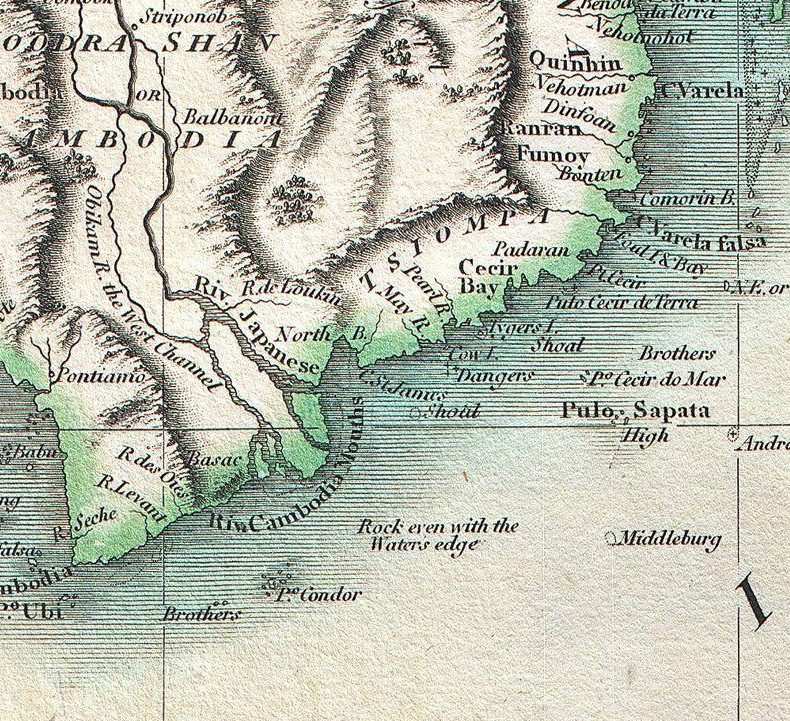
- Panduranga, Champa (Tsiompa), c. 1800
- Capital: Palai Bachong (757–875); Băl Hangâu (1172–1250); Phan Rang–Tháp Chàm (875–1172; 1250–1693); 11°34′N 108°59′E
- Common languages: Cham; Old Cham; Chamic languages Sanskrit; Malay
- Religion: Cham folk religion, Hinduism, Bani Islam, Sunni Islam, Buddhism
- Government: Monarchy
- King of Champa
  - 813–817 (Prince of Panduranga): Vikrantavarman III
  - 1471–1494 (first): Sultan Wan Abu Abdullah
  - 1659–1692 (last independent): Po Saut
- History
  - Established: 757
  - Downfall of Vijaya: 1471
  - Principality of Thuận Thành under Nguyen domain: 1693
  - Annexed by Vietnam: 1832
Preceded by	Succeeded by
Lâm Ấp	Principality of Thuận Thành
- Today part of: Vietnam

Panduranga (Old Cham: ꦥꦔ꧀ꦫꦻꦴꦔ꧀, ꦥꦤ꧀ꦫꦴꦔ꧀, romanized: Paṅrauṅ, Panrāṅ, Sanskrit: Sanskrit: पाण्डुरङ्ग, romanized: Pāṇḍuraṅga) or Prangdarang was a Cham Principality. Panduranga was the rump state of the Champa kingdom after Vietnamese emperor Lê Thánh Tông destroyed Champa in 1471 as part of the general policy of Nam tiến. The Panduranga principality was located in present-day south-central Vietnam and its centre is around the modern day city of Phan Rang. It stood until late 17th century when the Nguyễn lords of Đàng Trong, a powerful Vietnamese clan, vassalized it and subjugated the Cham polity as the Principality of Thuận Thành.

== History ==
=== Preface ===
Previously, Pänduranga (known to medieval Chinese sources as Bīn Tónglóng 賓童龍國 or Bēntuólàng 奔陀浪洲 and to Vietnamese annals as Phan Lung 潘朧 or Phan Lang 潘郎) was an autonomous princedom inside Champa. From the 13th century onward, it had been ruled by local dynasties that relatively independent from the court of the king of kings at Vijaya, central Champa.

Panduranga had its own revolt against the court of king Jaya Paramesvaravarman I (r. 1044–1060) in 1050. In contrast with scholars who view Champa as the kingdom exclusively of the Cham, recent scholars such as Po Dharma and Richard O'Connor, rebrand Champa as a multiethnic kingdom. They note that Champa was highly likely a coalition of the Cham lowlanders and the indigenous inhabitants of the Central Highlands, although Cham culture is usually associated with the broader culture of Champa.

=== Early period ===
Some studies suggest that Panduranga existed as a vassal state of the Funan kingdom before its annexation into Lâm Ấp by Phạm Dương Mại II in 433.

Following the collapse of the northern dynasties in the Lâm Ấp period, a new southern dynasty, called Panduranga, rose in 757, unifying the entire Champa under their rule. This dynasty established its capital at Virapura, also known as Palai Bachong (modern-day Ninh Phước).

In 774, the Javanese raided and destroyed Kauthara (Khánh Hòa province), burned the Po Nagar temple, and carried off the Shiva statue. The Cham king Satyavarman pursued the invaders and defeated them in a naval battle. In 781, Satyavarman erected a stele at Po Nagar, claiming victory and control over the entire region and rebuilding the temple. In 787, the Javanese attacked the capital Virapura and burned down the Shiva temple near Panduranga (Phan Rang).

From 1060 to 1074, Panduranga was the capital of king Rudravarman III (r. 1061–1074). During the 12th century when Khmer Empire invaded Champa and occupied most of the kingdom in 1145–1150, prince Sivänandana or Jaya Harivarman I (r. 1147–1162), son of refugee king Rudravarman IV, fled to Panduranga, then led a rebellion that resisted the Khmer and inflicted defeats on the invaders, forcing them to make a withdrawal in 1149. In 1151, province of Amaravarti (Quảng Ngãi province) revolted against Harivarman, followed by Panduranga in 1155. In 1190, Cham Prince Vidyanandana (r. 1192–1203) who had defected to the Khmer was nominated as puppet king of Pänduranga. Revolts ousted Khmer Prince In of Vijaya in 1191, which prompted Vidyanandana to rebel against the Khmer in 1192 and then reunified Champa. He faced massive retribution from Jayavarman VII of Angkor in the next year, but Vidyanandana's struggle for Champa lasted until 1203 when the capital of Vijaya fell to the Khmer and Vidyanandana himself fled and died in Dai Viet.

According to the Sakarai dak rai patao (Panduranga annals), the first king of Panduranga Principality was Po Sri Agarang. His rule lasted between 1195/1205 to 1235/1247. The king of kings at Vijaya still wrested certain suzerainty over Panduranga. Sri Agarang was succeeded by Cei Anâk, who reigned between 1235/1247 – 1269/1281. After the Agarang dynasty, Panduranga continued maintaining its sovereignty under the Debatasuar dynasty (1269–1373).

By the late 14th century, the whole of Champa had been unified again under the rule of a single strong dynasty, founded by Jaya Simhavarman VI (r. 1390–1400). Panduranga remained autonomous but asymmetrical and maintained a tributary relationship with the Simhavarmanids in Vijaya.

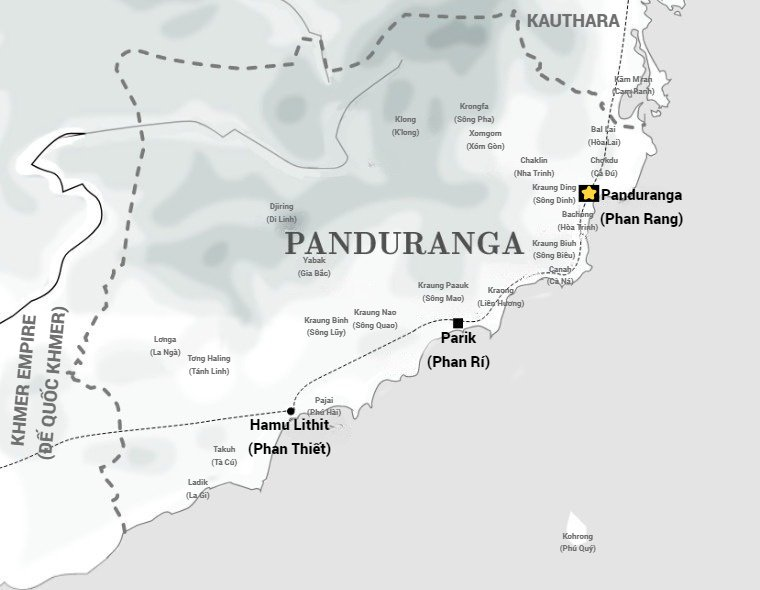
Territory of Panduranga during this period

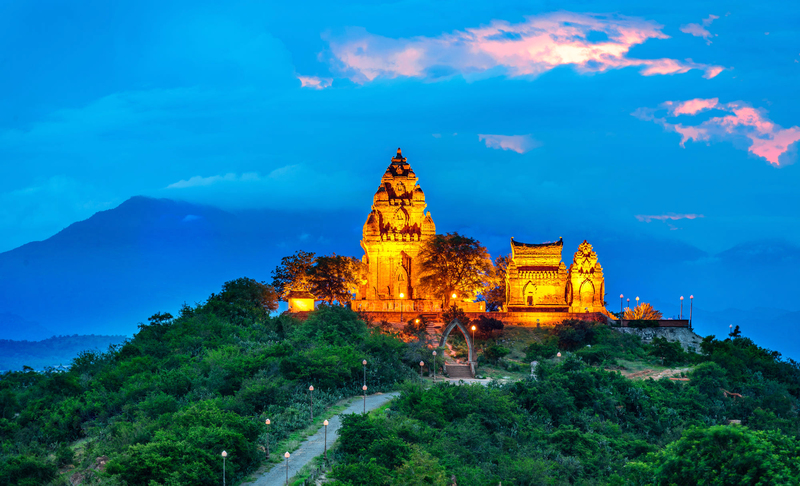
Po Klong Garai Temple – the religious center of Panduranga

=== Collapse of Vijaya and the beginning of Panduranga period ===
When Lê dynasty military under Le Thanh Tong attacked Champa in early 1471 in retaliation to centuries of rampant Cham invasions and piracy, the whole northern part of the kingdom was razed, cities ransacked, and tens of thousand people were killed, slaves were freed and sent back to homeland to further weaken rich Cham elites, as well as boosting Le Thanh Tong image. Cham artists and intellectuals were deported to northern Vietnam so that their criticism of Le dynasty cannot reach Cham people. Le Thanh Tong also captured the Cham king Tra Toan and his royal relatives as well as the rest of Vijaya clansmen, put them under house arrests within Cham embassy at Hanoi, ending the dynasty's reign. This event is widely recognized as the end of the Champa Kingdom, according to Georges Maspero's logics. However, it is noteworthy to know that the fall of Vijaya was not a "shift" of Champa power to the south or the end of the kingdom, but rather, reflects the multicentric nature of Champa, a confederation of semi-independent kingdoms which now were no longer under the prestige of the Vijaya king of kings.

Unsurprisingly, a massive wave of Cham emigration radiated across Southeast Asia: In Cambodia, Cham refugees were welcomed, but the sources do not provide how they arrived in Cambodia and where they settled. In Thailand, there were records of Cham presence since the Ayudhya period. In the Malay Archipelago, the Malay Annals state that after the collapse of Vijaya in 1471, two Cham princes named Indera Berma Shah and Shah Palembang sought asylum in Melaka and Aceh. Shortly after his conversion to Islam, Indera Berma Shah was appointed minister at the court of Sultan Mansur Shah. The Malay Annals also mentions a Cham presences in Pahang and Kelantan, where the Kampung Laut Mosque is said have been built by Champa sailors, on their way to Java and Aceh. Other famous Cham include Kelantan warrior queen Che Siti Wan Kembang and her daughter Puteri Saadong.

According to Vietnamese sources, on 22 March 1471, after the loss of the capital Vijaya to the Vietnamese force under Lê Thánh Tông, a Cham general named Bố Trì Trì (hypothetical Muslim name Sultan Wan Abu Abdullah Umdatuddin Azmatkhan; possibly Zhai Ya Ma Wu An in Chinese annals) fled to Panduranga's capital (Phan Rang) and set up his own rule and submitted to Le Thanh Tong seven days later. Thanh Tong agreed, but he divided the Cham remnants into three smaller polities: Kauthara, Panduranga, and the northern part of Central Highlands. Champa was reduced in six regions: Aia Ru (Phú Yên), Aia Trang (Khánh Hòa), Panrang (Phan Rang), Kraong (Long Hương), Parik (Phan Rí Cửa) and Pajai (Phú Hài). The Chinese Ming Shilu provides another deviation of the timeline: Although the Vietnamese sacking of Vijaya in March 1471, King Gu Lai still facilitated token diplomacy with Ming Empire in 1478 and onwards; his son Sha Gu Bu Luo sought succession investiture from the Ming in 1505 and obtained it in 1515. Their last contact occurred in 1543.

According to the Cham annals, from 1421/1448 to 1567/1579, the capital of Panduranga was Biuh Bal Batsinâng. From 1567/1579 to the early 17th century, it was relocated to Bal Pangdarang (both around present-day Phan Rang). From the early 17th century until 1832, the capital of Panduranga was once again moved south to Phan Rí Cửa.

The Cham stopped paying tribute to the Viet court when the Le was usurped by the Mạc dynasty in 1526.

=== Revival ===
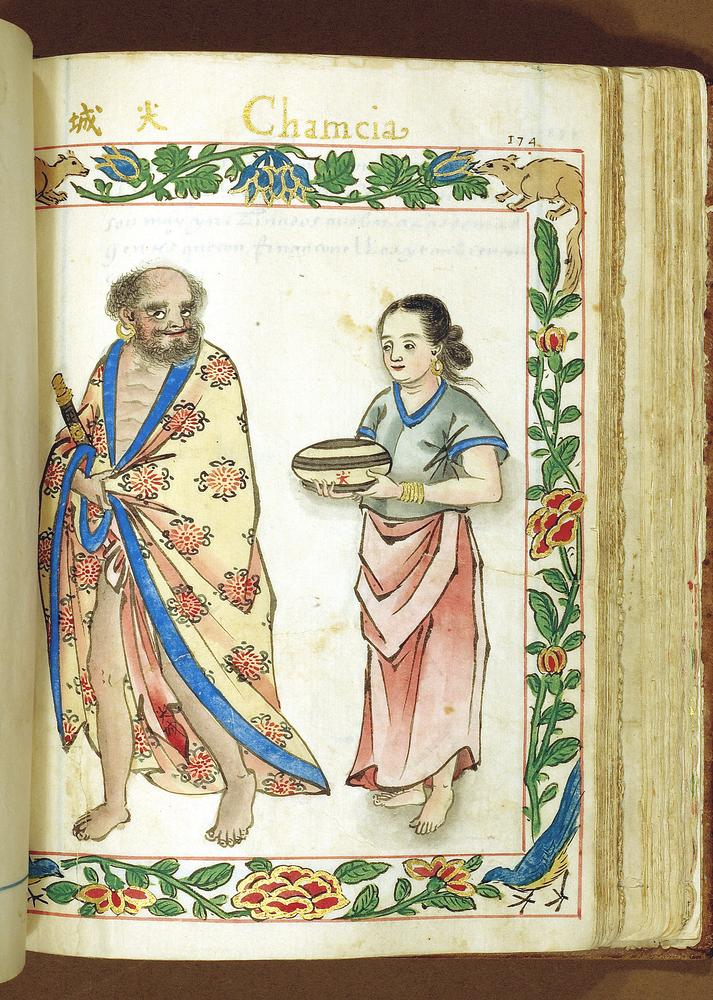
The Boxer Codex depiction of Chamcia (Cham) couple, c. 1595

During the sixteenth century, as Dai Viet fragmented in the north, Panduranga Champa again prospered from the rise of international trade. Throughout the seventeenth century, Cham merchants traded actively in Siam, Manila, Macao, Malacca, Johor, Pahang, Patani, and Makassar. A Spanish record reported that "many Muslims live in Champa, whose Hindu king wanted Islam to be spoken and taught, resulting in many mosques existing along with Hindu temples.

Between 1553 and 1579, Champa (Panduranga region) was under the reign of King Po At (Vietnamese name Bà Ất, Muslim name possibly Shafi'i Ibn Abu Khasim). According to Malaysian records, Shafi'i Ibn Abu Khasim urgently sent aid materials to the Sultanate of Johor when its capital was attacked by the Portuguese after a letter delivered to him via an Arab merchant's pigeon. Today, his shrine is located in Mbok Dhot, Phan Hòa commune, Bắc Bình district, Bình Thuận province.

In 1578, Panduranga assaulted the Nguyen lords' domain near Đà Rằng River. In 1594, the Panduranga king sent a fleet of 400 warships to aid the Johor Sultanate in its struggles against the Portuguese in Melaka.

Panduranga also helped its neighbor Cambodia during the Cambodian–Spanish War, which resulted in delivering a fiasco to the Spanish conquistadors. The Governor of Manila, Luis Pérez Dasmariñas (fl. 1593–96) sent a letter to the court of king Philip II in late 1595, antagonizing the Cham king as "a vicious dangerous tyrant who was treacherous and full of evil deeds," while his second letter suggested that just around 200–300 Spanish soldiers and 500 local mercenaries would be needed to conquer Champa. During that time, the Cham were remembered by Spanish, Portuguese, and Dutch merchants and seamen as ferocious pirates of the South China Sea who numerously boarded merchant ships, plundering cargos, kidnapping crew members, and routinely took European hostages to slavery. Cham kings were described to be at least involved or actively encouraging raids against foreign ships.

In 1611, in an attempt to retake land from the Nguyen lord, Champa mounted an attack in Phu Yen, but gained no success, and the Kauthara principality was lost to the Nguyen after a counterattack in 1653.

=== Later period under Po Rome dynasty ===
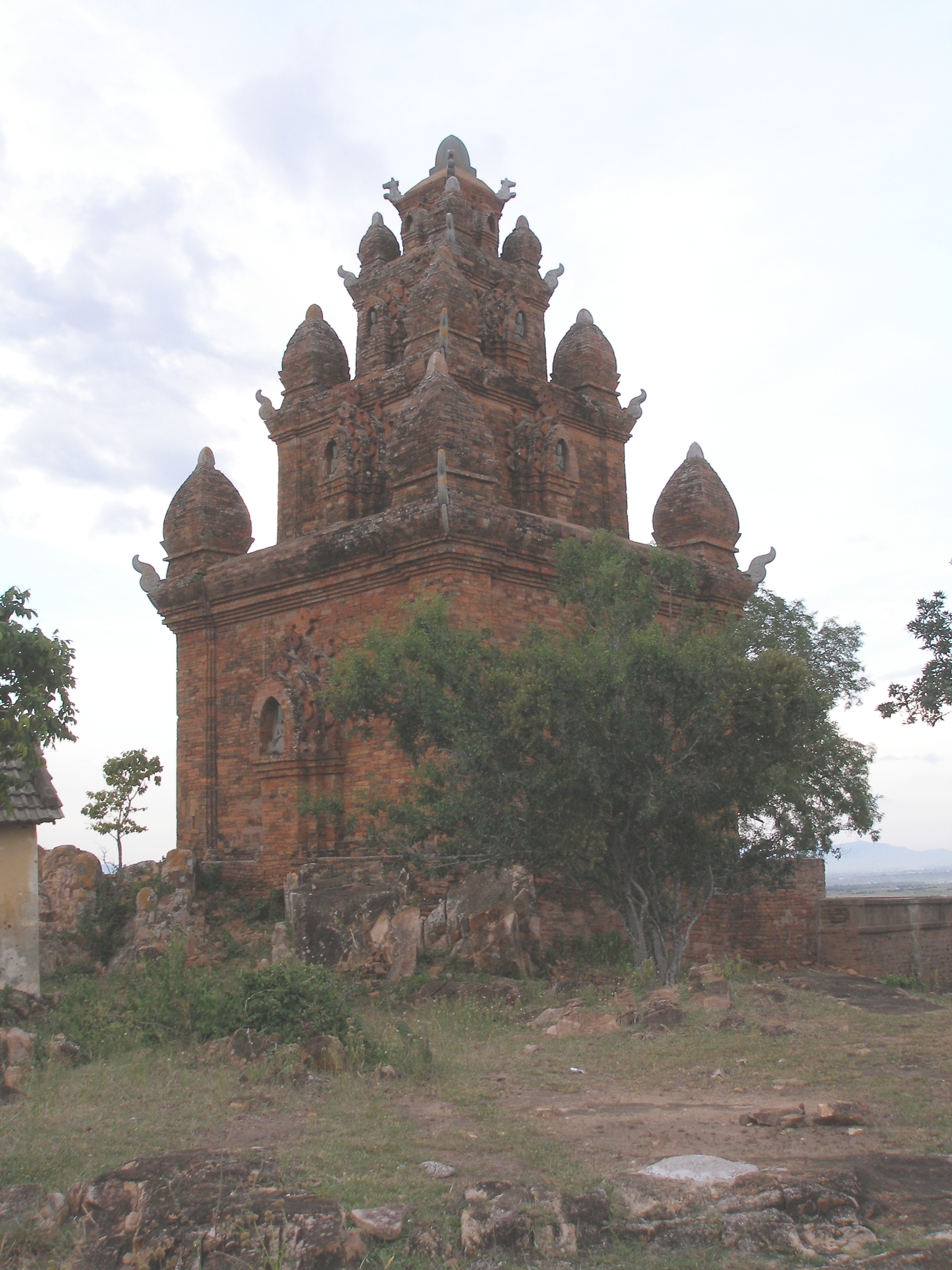
Temple of King Po Rome (r. 1627–1651)

With the rise of nearby Hội An, most foreign traders now were leaving Champa. Japanese seal trade ships ceased to trade with Champa in 1623. In 1611, lord Nguyen Phuc Nguyen sent an army led by Văn Phong, a Cham defector, attacking Panduranga, annexing the entire Kauthara Principality. Nguyen lord then resettled 30,000 Trinh POWs in Phu Yen.

Notable Cham king of this period, Po Rome (r. 1627–1651), was known for his great erudition of Islam after having a sojourn study in Kelantan, Malay Peninsula, and the mass conversion to Islam by his people. He encouraged trade, granting the Dutch permission to arrange free trade in his country providing that they refrained from attacking Portuguese merchants at his ports. To resolve discontents between Muslims and Balamon, Po Rome ordered the Cham Bani to have their religion more integrated with Cham customs and beliefs, while pressing the Ahier to accept Allah as the most supreme God but allowed them to retain their worships of traditional Cham divinities, excellently reforging peace and cohesion in his kingdom. King Po Rome is an important deity that is being venerated by the Cham people today. Connections between Panduranga and the extra Malay/Islamic world blossomed. Syncretism was widely practiced at all levels, best known for incorporating cosmopolitan Islamic doctrines into existing indigenous Cham beliefs and Hindu pantheons. The multipurpose lunisolar sakawi calendar, was likely Po Rome's best combination of previous Cham Śaka era with the Islamic lunar calendar.

European missionaries described Champa in the 1670s as having the majority of its population being Muslims, a Muslim sultan, and a Muslim court. In 1680 Panduranga king Po Saut (r. 1659–1692) styled himself with Malay horrific Paduka Seri Sultan in his hand letter to the Dutch in Java. In 1686, the Cham and Malay Muslim communities in Siam reportedly joined the Makassars rebellion against king Narai of Ayudhya.

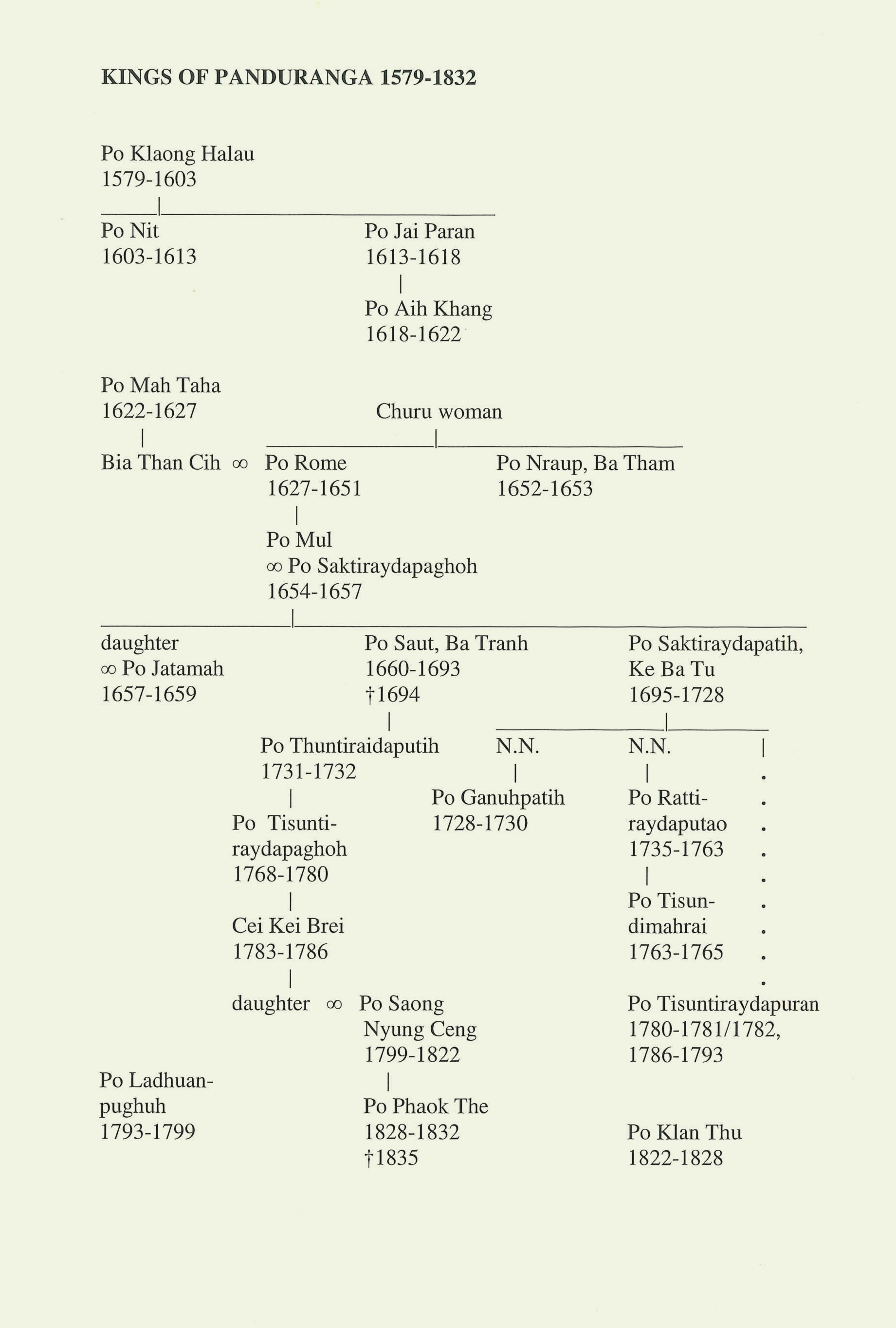
Pedigree of the Kings of Panduranga.

Under Po Rome's dynasty, Panduranga suffered several incursions from the Nguyễn lords which centered around trading centers Huế-Hoi An, the old center region of Champa which had been recently Vietnamized. Lords Nguyễn Phúc Nguyên, Nguyễn Phúc Tần, and Nguyễn Phúc Chu repeatedly invaded Panduranga in 1611, 1629, 1653, 1692. During the late 16th and early 17th centuries, the Nguyễn lords were preoccupied with fighting in the Trịnh–Nguyễn War against the Trịnh lords rather than with the Cham. Though was not recorded in official chronicles, but in dynastic genealogy and pseudonymous Cham sources, in 1631 Nguyễn Phúc Nguyên arranged the marriage of his princess Nguyễn Phúc Ngọc Khoa to king Po Rome. Alexander de Rhodes describes sometime in 1639, the Nguyen still placed several galleys in the port of Ran Ran (Phú Yên) to prevent seaborne incursion from Champa.

Having successfully fended off the Trinh, the Nguyen thalassocracy turned its attention to the south, dispatching their first interference in Cambodia, overthrowing its first and only Muslim king Ramathipadi I in 1658. The Nguyen had periodically invaded Cambodia several times from 1658 to 1692 on par with Siam. In 1682, Panduranga reportedly sent envoys led by the king's brothers who had fled after the king's coronation to Ayudhya in a possible search for Siamese protection.

In 1692, lord Nguyễn Phúc Chu invaded Panduranga, arresting King Po Saut and renaming Panduranga to Trấn Thuận Thành (Principality of Thuận Thành). The lord established Bình Thuận District inside the Principality as free lands for ethnic Viet settler colonialism, but Cham revolts in 1693–96 forced the Nguyen lord to mitigate the resentment by abolishing the Binh Thuan county, restoring the Cham monarchy with full rights, but as a vassal of the Nguyen, according to a following treaty signed in 1712. In 1694, Panduranga king Po Saktiraydapatih (r. 1695–1727) received the title King of Thuan Thanh. From 1695 onward, Panduranga had been reduced to a client state of the Nguyen domain, known as the Principality of Thuận Thành (Trấn Thuận Thành – Principality of 'Submissive Citadel').

== Society ==
During the 16th century, Cham merchants renewed their commercial links and actively traded in Siam, Manila, Macao, Malacca, Johor, Pahang, Patani, and Makassar. Among their exports, Cham textile was famously consumed.

The 17th-century Chinese compendium Xiyang Chao Gong Dian Lu (Tributes from the countries of the Western Sea, c. 1650) describes a type of Cham brewed liquor that is made from cooked rice, mixed with wine and medicines, contained in pottery, and is drunk by long bamboo straws. People would sit around the container and take sips.

Proselytization of Islam increased sharply after the fall of Vijaya, as missionary Gabriel de San Antonio wrote a description in 1585: "The locals (Chams) hated the Castilians and believed prophecies made by the Moro (Muslims), that there would be a king Mahoma (a Muslim king), and many would embrace the new faith."

Currently, there are two theories among academic consensus regard the apostle of Islam to Champa, proposed by scholars Antoine Cabaton and Pierre-Yves Manguin. The first theory states that Islam could have been introduced by Arab, Persian, Indian merchants, scholars, religious leaders, from the 10th to 14th century. The second theory argues that Islam arrived in Champa through a later, shorter, indirectly way from the Malays (jawa, melayu, chvea), according to Manguin, is more convincing and valid. Most historians agree that the Cham only began converting to Islam en masse after the destruction of Vijaya. In his conclusion, Manguin attributes the Islamization of the Cham people to their active participation in the regional maritime networks, and the Malay states and Malay traders which also contributed great impacts to the process.

== List of rulers (1471–1694) ==
King of Champa	Reign
Po Tih (?Wan Abu Abdullah Umalauddin Azmatkhan)	1471–?
Zhai Ya Ma Wu An (?Wan Abu Yusuf)	?–1478
Gu Lai (?Wan Abdul Kadir)	1478–1505
Sha Gu Bu Luo (?Sah Kabrah)	1505–after 1521
Po Kabih	?–c. 1530
Po Karutdrak	c. 1530–1536
Maha Sarak	c. 1536–1541
Po Kunarai (?Sha Ri Di Zhai)	c. 1541–1553
Po At (?Shafi'i Ibn Abu Khasim)	c. 1553–1578
Po Klaong Halau	c. 1579–1603
Po Nit	c. 1603–1613
Po Jai Paran	c. 1613–1618
Po Aih Khang	c. 1618–1622
Po Klong M'hnai	c. 1622–1627
Po Rome (Sultan Abdul Hamid Shah)	c. 1627–1651
Po Nraop (Sultan Ibrahim)	c. 1651–1653
Po Saktiraydapaghoh	c. 1654–1657
Po Jatamah (Wan Muhammad Amin)	c. 1657–1659
Po Saut (Wan Daim)	c. 1660–1692

== See also ==
- Legendary Champa rulers
- Principality of Thuận Thành
- History of Champa
