= Bố Trì Trì =

King of Champa (fl. 1472)

- King of Champa; King of Panduranga

King of Champa
- Reign: 1471-?
- Predecessor: Maha Sajan (as King of Champa)
- Successor: Zhai Ya Ma Wu An
- Born: ? Champa
- Died: 1470s Panduranga, Champa
- Religion: Hinduism

Bố Trì Trì 逋持持 (fl. 1471) was a King of Panduranga in Champa who briefly set himself up as king after the fall of the Cham capital Vijaya to the Vietnamese in 1471.

His name is only known in Vietnamese transcription (in Chinese, Bu Chi Chi). The troops of Emperor Lê Thánh Tông captured Vijaya on 22 March 1471, bringing about the destruction of the Cham kingdom based in Bình Định. The chronicle Đại Việt sử ký toàn thư explains how the Vietnamese applied a divide-and-rule policy to control the territory of Champa. As it says, Bố Trì Trì was a general of the captured Cham king Maha Sajan. When the king had been taken, the general fled to Panduranga in the far south, occupied that land, and proclaimed himself the ruler of Champa. Panduranga was one of the traditional five lands of Champa (together with Kauthara, Vijaya, Amaravati, and Indrapura). Having established his power in the south, Bố Trì Trì sent envoys to Lê Thánh Tông, declaring himself a vassal and offering tribute. This was accepted by the Vietnamese ruler, who also proclaimed separate vassal kings in Hoa Anh and Nam Bàn, making three Cham polities "in order to bind them". Another prince, Maha Sajan's brother Bàn La Trà Toại, also tried to set himself up as ruler in opposition to the Vietnamese, but was captured after some years.

It is not known for how long Bố Trì Trì regned in Panduranga. Later in the 1470s, a grandson or nephew of the old king appeared, in Chinese transcription called Zhai Ya Ma Wu An (probably Jayavarman). Whether he is the same person as Bố Trì Trì is unknown but doubtful.

Preceded by Maha Sajan 1460-1471	Champa rulers 1471–1470s	Succeeded by Zhai Ya Ma Wu An ?-1478
