= Po Binnasuar =

- King of Panduranga
- Reign: 1316/1328–1361/1373
- Predecessor: Po Patarsuar
- Successor: Po Parican
- Born: ? Aia Radak village, Phan Rang, Champa
- Died: 1361/1373
- Burial: Bal Riya village, Ninh Thuan
- Spouse: Bia Soy
Names
- Po Binnasuar

Po Binnasuar was a king of Panduranga, ruling from 1316/1328 to 1361/1373. Panduranga was a medieval Cham principality located in present-day Southeastern Vietnam.

Dorohiem and Dohamide in their 1965 history Dân tộc Chàm lược sử incorrectly assume Po Binnasuar with the profile of Chế Bồng Nga.

Preceded by Po Patarsuar 1306–1328	King of Panduranga; 1313/1328–1361/1373	Succeeded by Po Parican 1373–1397
