= Gu Lai =

King of Champa (d. 1505)

- King of Champa; King of Panduranga

King of Champa
- Reign: 1478-1505
- Predecessor: Zhai Ya Ma Wu An
- Successor: Sha Gu Bu Luo
- Born: Champa
- Died: 1505; Panduranga, Champa
- Issue: Sha Gu Bu Luo; Kusuma
- Religion: Hinduism

Gu Lai 古來 (died 1505) is the Chinese transcription of the name of a King of Panduranga in Champa. He ruled in 1478–1505 in rivalry with another claimant and relied on support from the Chinese Ming Dynasty for his survival. His name might correspond to the Cham name Garay.

== Contested succession and exile ==
In the years after the defeat of the Cham Kingdom at the hands of the Vietnamese (1471), the southernmost part of Champa, Panduranga, emerged as the principal Cham polity. A grandson or nephew of the old king, Zhai Ya Ma Wu An, was acknowledged by the Lê dynasty as vassal ruler but died under murky circumstances in 1478, either by illness or assassination. The murderer was allegedly Gu Lai who is referred as the brother of the slain ruler, but was alternatively described as one of his chieftains. After Zhai Ya Ma Wu An's demise, a confused situation arose. The Vietnamese appointed a certain Ti Po Tai (Devata?) to temporarily handle the affairs of the Cham kingdom. However, Ti Po Tai was violently opposed by Gu Lai. By 1480, Champa's territory was divided between the two contenders. Eventually Gu Lai managed to kill his rival by 1486. This led to a Vietnamese intervention that aimed to back up the offspring of Ti Po Tai. Gu Lai had to flee the country and reached Hainan Island in China with his court and some 1000 followers. Thus Gu Lai sought support from the Ming Dynasty which had interests in containing the expansive Lê Dynasty.

== Return to power ==
Gu Lai could return to Champa with Chinese escort after about three years. The Mingshi says that he lost his son Kusuma who was killed by Vietnamese forces (before 1489); however, the king then led his forces against the adversaries and scored a significant military victory that redressed the situation. The Vietnamese chronicles are silent about this defeat, and are not much concerned with Champa affairs after 1471. Gu Lai's reign in Champa was marked by continuing conflicts with Vietnam, and he asked the Ming Emperor to intervene and make a settlement. In 1499, he requested that the Ming court should give formal enfeoffment to his son Sha Gu Bu Luo, since he was old and his son could better protect the kingdom. The Ming Emperor did not approve this since Gu Lai was still alive. According to the Mingshi, Gu Lai died in 1505. Sha Gu Bu Luo appears as king in the next years, though relations with the Ming became rarer over time.

In the time of Gu Lai, the first European information about Champa for centuries appears on the Cantino planisphere (c. 1502). The Portuguese arrived to India in 1498 and gathered information from Asian merchants. The maps testifies to the lasting economic significance of Champa (called "Champocachim", i.e. Cochin-Champa) in maritime Asia: "Champocachim lies at the sixth latitude to the north. There is found lacquer, benzoin, brazilwood, sandalwood, musk, agarwood, and all other merchandise otherwise described".

Preceded by Zhai Ya Ma Wu An ?-1478	Champa rulers 1478–1505	Succeeded by Sha Gu Bu Luo 1505-after 1521
