= Maha Sajan =

- Raja-di-raja

King of Champa
- Reign: 1460–1471
- Predecessor: Maha Saya
- Successor: Maha Sajai
- Born: Unknown; Vijaya, Champa
- Died: 1471; Nghệ An, Đại Việt
Regnal name
- Maha Sajan

Maha Sajan (died 1471) or Bàn La Trà Toàn, Panluo Chaquan (槃羅茶全) in Chinese sources, was king of Champa from 1460 to 1471, the year of the fall of Champa. In 1471, in a reaction to a Cham raid against Hóa Châu, the emperor Lê Thánh Tông of Đại Việt (Vietnam), invaded Champa.

The Vietnamese captured the Cham capital of Vijaya, murdering 60,000 and imprisoning another 30,000. P'an-Lo T'ou-Ts'iuan was captured, became ill and died on junk taking him away. The Vietnamese cut off his head, and cremated his body. His ashes were scattered into river. His head was taken to Thang Long, and presented to the imperial ancestral temple.

This was the final defeat of Champa, which then became three minor principalities under the protection Đại Việt.

Preceded by Maha Saya 1458–1460	King of Champa; 146–1471	Succeeded by Maha Sajai 1471–1474
