= Phan Rang–Tháp Chàm =

Phan Rang–Tháp Chàm Phan Rang, Panduranga
- Provincial city (Class-2)
- Phan Rang–Tháp Chàm City; Thành phố Phan Rang–Tháp Chàm
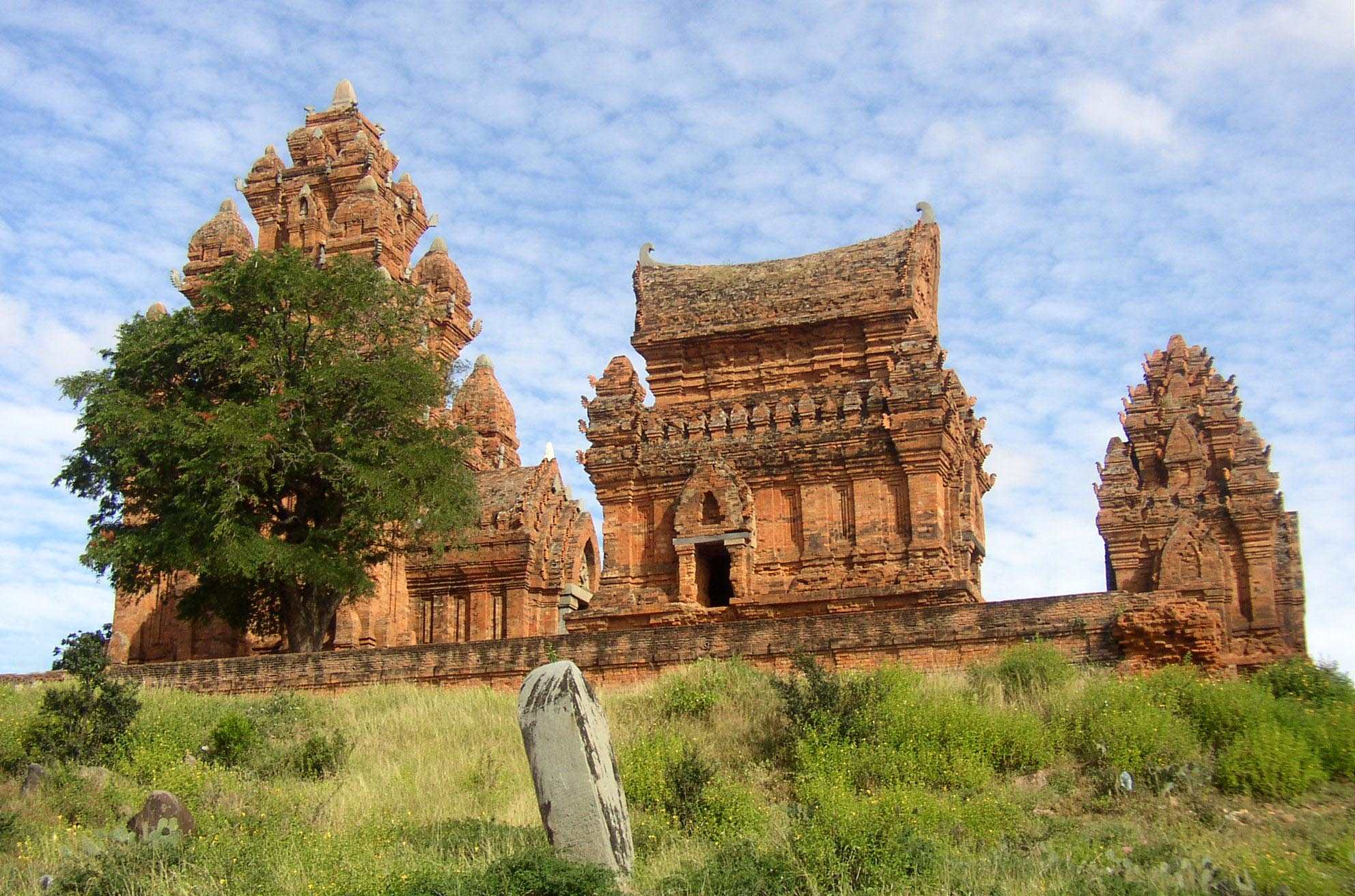
- Po Klong Garai Temple
- Nickname: Land of the towers
- Location of in Vietnam Phan Rang–Tháp Chàm (Southeast Asia) Phan Rang–Tháp Chàm (Asia)
- Coordinates: 11°34′N 108°59′E
- Country: Vietnam
- Province: Ninh Thuận
- Region: South Central Coast
- Headquarter: No. 6A, 21/8 Street, Kinh Dinh Ward
- Incorporated: 1917, as Phan Rang town, by Khải Định
- Consolidated: 2007, as the City of Phan Rang - Tháp Chàm
- Named for: Panduranga and Po Klong Garai Temple
- Subdivision: 12 wards, 1 commune

Area
  - Provincial city (Class-2): 79.18 km^{2} (30.57 sq mi)
- Elevation: 9 m (30 ft)

Population (2023)
  - Provincial city (Class-2): 207,998
  - Density: 2,626/km^{2} (6,800/sq mi)
  - Urban: 196,459
  - Rural: 11,539
  - Ethnicities: Vietnamese; Chams
- Time zone: UTC+07:00 (ICT)
- Postal code: 59000
- Area code: 259
- Vehicle registration: 85-B1
- Climate: As
- Website: prtc.ninhthuan.gov.vn

Phan Rang–Tháp Chàm, commonly known as Phan Rang, is a former city in Vietnam and the capital of Ninh Thuận Province. The community has a population of 207,998 (2023), of which 196,459 (2023) live in the main city.

== Etymology ==
The name Phan Rang or in modern Cham Pan(da)rang is an indigenous Chamized form of the original Sanskrit Pāṇḍuraṅga (another epithet for the Hindu god Vithoba). It first appeared on Cham inscriptions around the tenth century as Paṅrauṅ or Panrāṅ, and after that, it has been Vietnamese transliterated into Phan Rang. The name Tháp Chàm means "Cham Temple/Tower" and is named after the Po Klong Garai Temple in the northern part of the city.

== History ==
=== Champa period ===
What is now Phan Rang was formerly known as Panduranga, a principality of Champa kingdom.

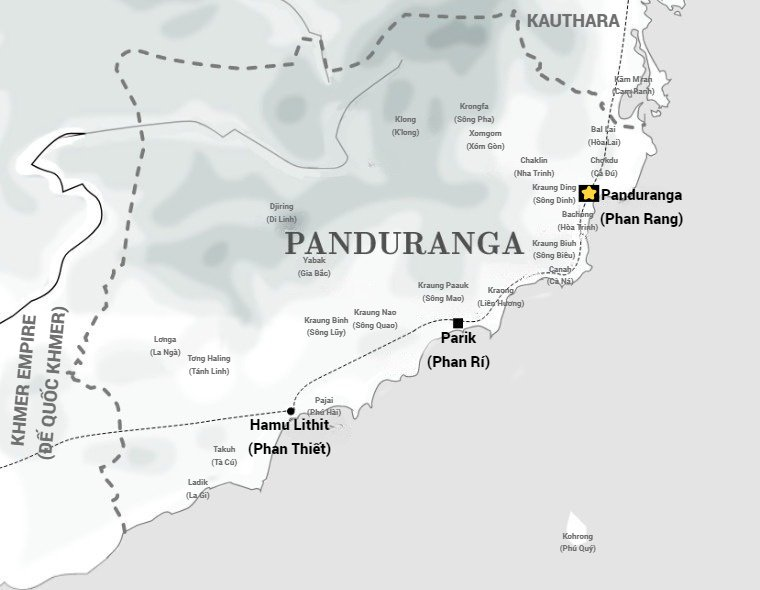
The territory of Panduranga with its capital Phan Rang

In 757, the southern Champa polity of Panduranga was founded with local autonomy granted by the Champa king. Phan Rang then quickly rose as its religious and cultural center. Following the Dai Viet attack on Vijaya in 1471, Panduranga became the Champa kingdom's capital, serving in this role until 1693. The Panduranga Principality was annexed by the Vietnamese in 1832, marking the fall of the last Champa Kingdom.

=== Modern period ===
The town of Phan Rang was established in 1917 during the Nguyễn dynasty, by edict of Emperor Khải Định, and remained the provincial capital of Ninh Thuận Province until 1976, when the province merged with Bình Thuận Province to form Thuận Hải Province.

When the Japanese occupied the country in World War II, they established an airfield and it was later used by the French. During the Republic of Vietnam, Phan Rang was the site of the United States Air Force's Phan Rang Air Base in the Vietnam War.

The town was divided into Phan Rang in the east, which became part of Ninh Hải District and Tháp Chàm in the west, which became part of An Son district. The two were again combined in 1992 to become Phan Rang–Tháp Chàm, the capital of Ninh Thuận Province, achieving city status in 2007.

== Geography ==
Phan Rang–Tháp Chàm city is located in the center of Ninh Thuận province, 1,380 km south of Hanoi, 330 km northeast of Ho Chi Minh City, 95 km south of Nha Trang, with geographical location:

- The east borders the South China Sea (Phan Rang Bay).
- The west borders Ninh Sơn district.
- The south borders Ninh Phước district
- The north borders Bác Ái district and Ninh Hải district.

=== Climate ===
Located in the southernmost part of the South Central Coast region, Phan Rang has a tropical savanna climate (Köppen As), just rainy enough to preclude it from a semi arid classification. The average annual temperature ranges from 27 to 28 °C (80.6 to 82.4 °F), the average rainfall ranges from 700 to 800 millimetres (28 to 31 in) and humidity is about 70-75%.

The city's climate is divided into two distinct seasons, which are the dry season from December to August of the following year and the rainy season from September to November. Although belonging to the tropical region, Phan Rang is among the cities with the least rainfall in the country, only about 1/3 of the national average, and the lowest in Southeast Asia outside the Myanmar Dry Zone.

Climate data for Phan Rang–Tháp Chàm (1993–2020)
Month	Jan	Feb	Mar	Apr	May	Jun	Jul	Aug	Sep	Oct	Nov	Dec	Year
Record high °C (°F)	—	—	—	—	—	—	—	—	—	35.3 (95.5)	—	—	35.3 (95.5)
Daily mean °C (°F)	25.1 (77.2)	25.4 (77.7)	26.6 (79.9)	28.1 (82.6)	29.3 (84.7)	29.1 (84.4)	28.5 (83.3)	28.6 (83.5)	27.9 (82.2)	27.2 (81.0)	26.7 (80.1)	25.6 (78.1)	27.1 (80.8)
Average rainfall mm (inches)	8.8 (0.35)	2.8 (0.11)	12.0 (0.47)	20.4 (0.80)	65.6 (2.58)	61.7 (2.43)	54.7 (2.15)	51.2 (2.02)	138.6 (5.46)	168.1 (6.62)	171.0 (6.73)	83.6 (3.29)	838.5 (33.01)
Average relative humidity (%)	71.9	72.3	74.9	76.2	76.8	75.3	75.8	76.2	79.5	80.5	78.6	74.5	76.0
Mean monthly sunshine hours	241.7	255.2	278.5	278.3	258.2	239.2	234.0	242.2	195.6	194.0	189.7	189.4	3,029
Source: Vietnam Meteorological and Hydrological Administration

== Administration ==
Phan Rang–Tháp Chàm city is divided into 13 commune-level administrative units, including 12 wards: Bảo An, Đài Sơn, Đạo Long, Đô Vinh, Đông Hải, Kinh Dinh, Mỹ Bình, Mỹ Đông, Mỹ Hải, Phủ Hà, Phước Mỹ, Văn Hải and 1 commune: Thành Hải.

List of administrative units under Phan Rang–Tháp Chàm city

Name	Area (km^{2})	Population	Density
Wards (12)
Bảo An	3.22	12,388	3,847
Đài Sơn	1.43	10,371	7,252
Đạo Long	2.08	10,540	5,067
Đô Vinh	30.30	17,105	564
Đông Hải	2.19	24,676	11,267
Kinh Dinh	3.50	24,656	7,044
Mỹ Bình	4.38	10,168	2,321
Mỹ Đông	2.50	15,112	6,044

Name	Area (km^{2})	Population	Density
Mỹ Hải	2.70	6,520	2,415
Phủ Hà	2.40	23,957	9,982
Phước Mỹ	6.00	20,415	3,402
Văn Hải	9.22	19,825	2,150
Commune (1)
Thành Hải	9.22	11,539	1,251

== Economy ==
Phan Rang–Tháp Chàm city has a very large contribution rate to the socio-economic development of Ninh Thuận province. Economic development reached a growth rate of 9.6%; Total social investment is over 4,515 billion VND.

=== Trade and services ===
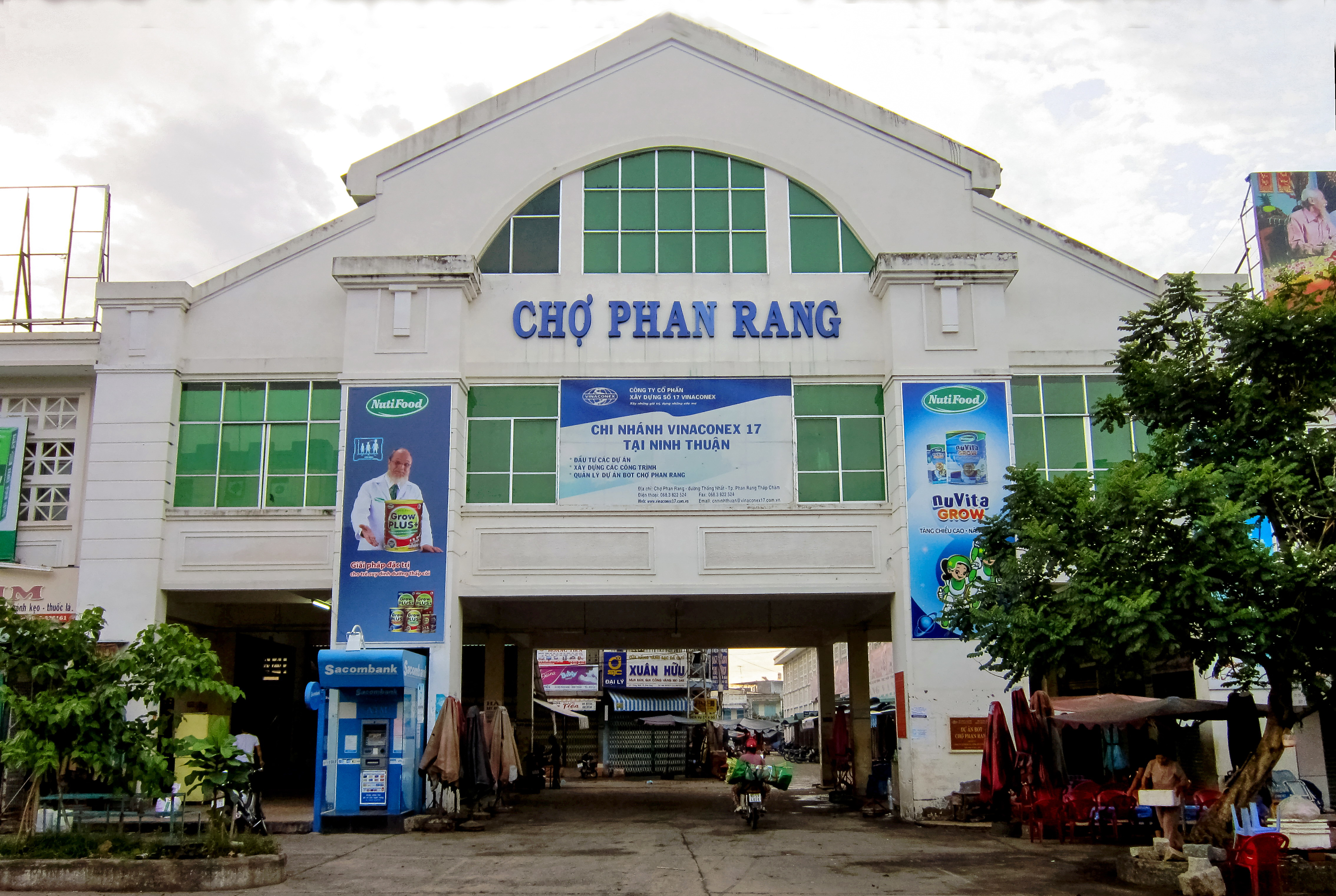
Phan Rang market

Trade and services are a key industry, with a total production value of over 20,700 billion VND, an increase of 9.6%, accounting for 62.3%. The city continues to promote Resolution No. 03-NQ/TU of the Standing Committee of the City on the development of the trade and service industry. Total retail sales of goods and service revenue are estimated at over 29,026 billion VND, an increase of 12.28%; Of which retail revenue of goods was over 24,853 billion VND, accounting for 85.6%, an increase of 11.3%; Accommodation and food services were over VND 2,866 billion, an increase of 19.5%.

=== Industry and construction ===
Industry grew at a relative speed. The city has implemented many high-value construction projects that have contributed to increasing the production value of the construction industry, with a production value of over 3,763 billion VND, an increase of 8.8%. For industry, the production value is over 6,862 billion VND. The main products are: Frozen shrimp, up 5.5%; dry cashews, up 31%; standard refined sugar, up 41.24%; Aloe vera jelly production, increased by 7.5%. In the city, there are Thap Cham Industrial Cluster and Thanh Hai Industrial Park.

=== Agriculture / Fisheries ===
The agriculture and fisheries sector accounts for 8 - 10% of the economic structure

==== Agriculture ====
In agriculture, rice and grapes are the two main crops grown in this locality. The city's rice production has an annual output of more than 30,000 tons. Phan Rang specialty grapes are known for their high quality, used mainly for wine production.

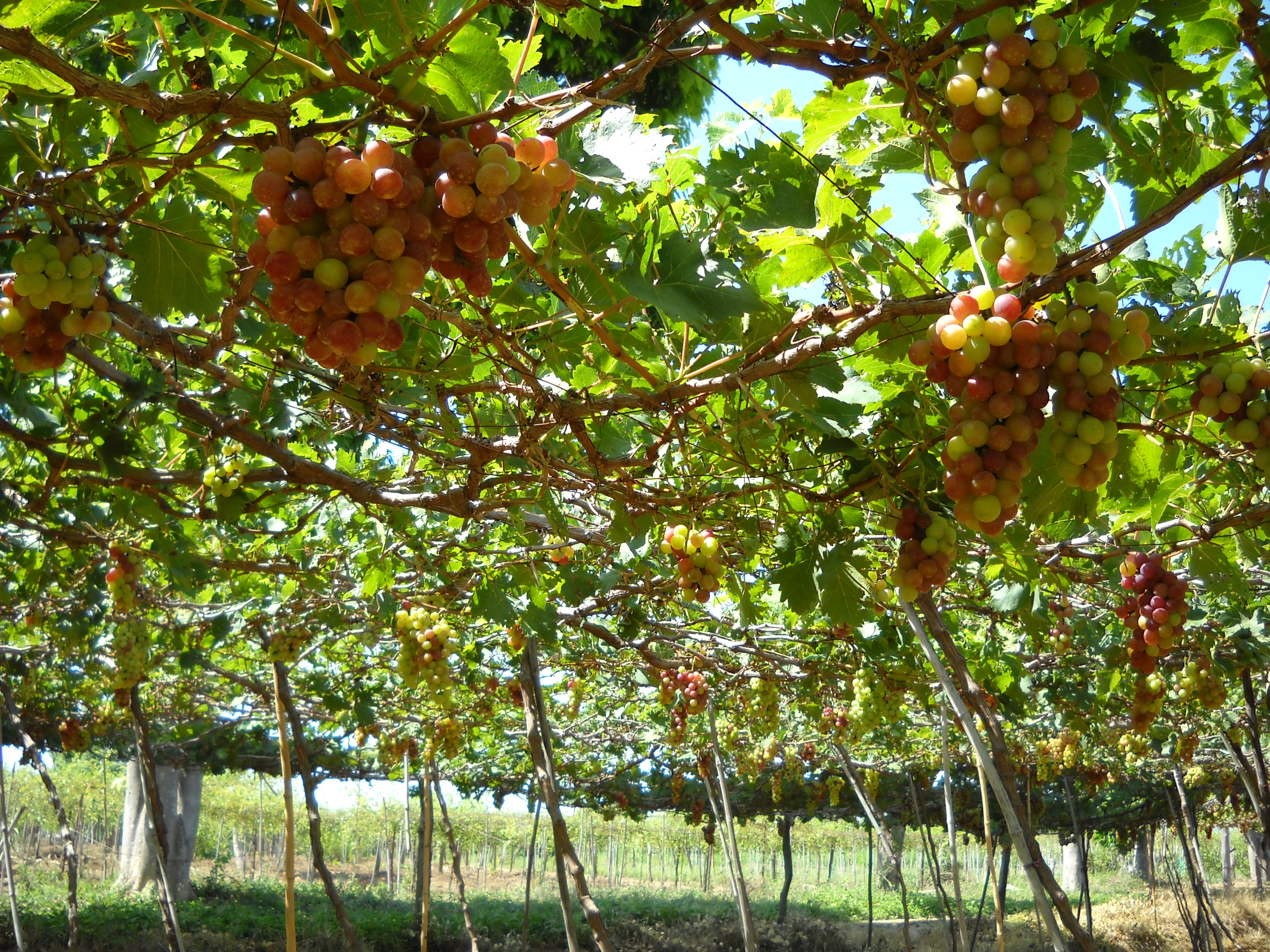
Phan Rang vineyard

==== Fisheries ====
With a 10-km-long coastline, Phan Rang–Tháp Chàm's seafood industry plays an important role in the local economy. Seafood such as fish, shrimp, scallops, and squid are exploited and farmed. Among them, industrial shrimp farming is a strongly developing industry.

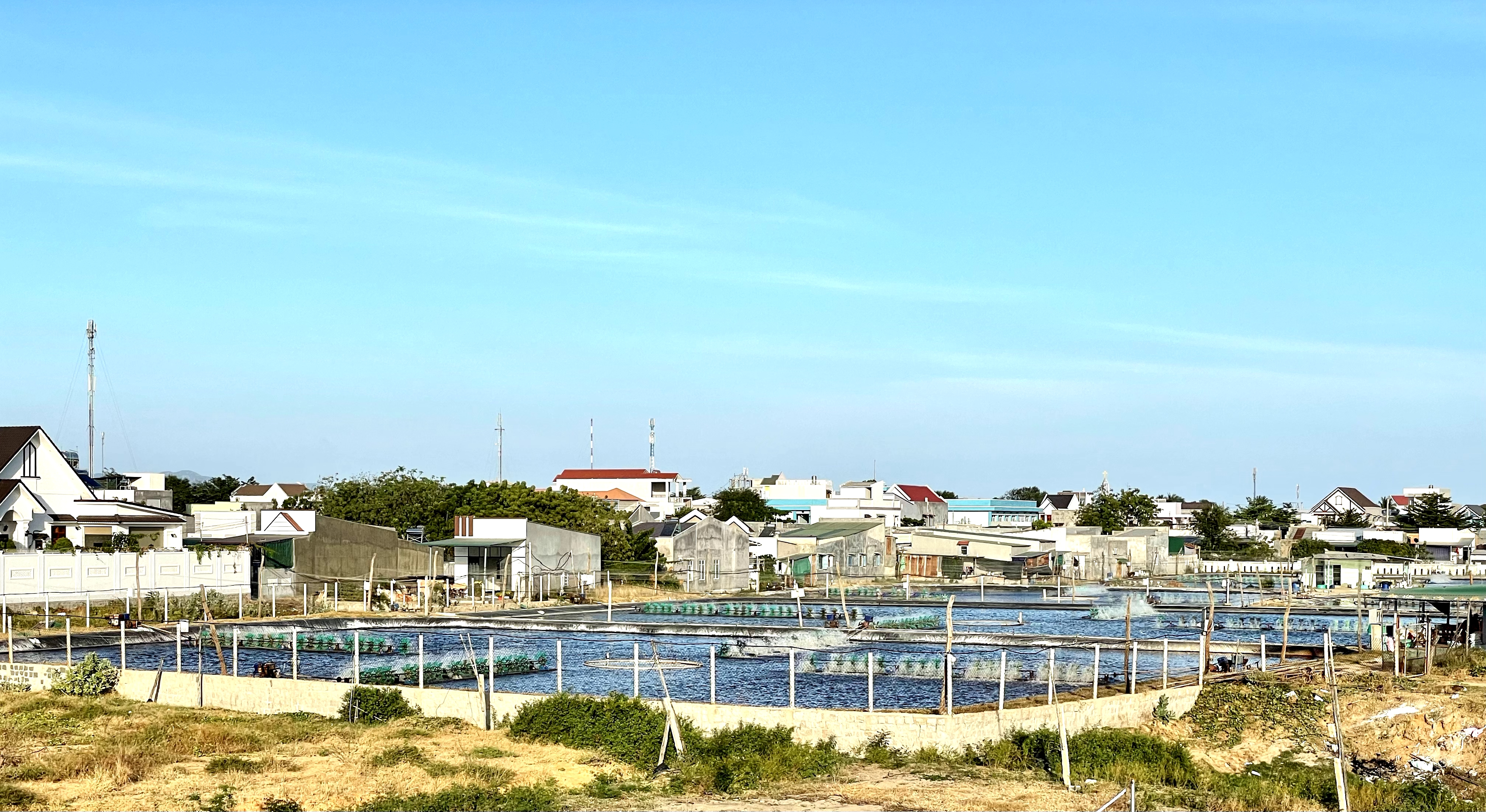
Industrial shrimp farming in Đông Hải, Phan Rang

== Culture ==
=== Cham ===
Phan Rang–Tháp Chàm has become a center for the maintenance of Cham culture. Many Cham people live in the suburbs of the city where they have rice paddies, orchards of grapes and peaches, flocks of goats and Brahman cattle. Their towers (the 'Thap') are beautiful memorials to their kings and queens. There are several Cham sites with dilapidated towers along the central coast of Vietnam and major sites in Mỹ Sơn and Nha Trang.

However, there are two sites in the Phan Rang–Tháp Chàm being maintained and culturally active. Two kilometers west of the Tháp Chàm Railway Station, there is excellent hilltop Cham tower complex dedicated to the king Po Klong Garai, the last reigning king; his likeness is depicted on a lingam in the sanctuary of the central tower. A second tower for the king Po Rome is located about 20 km south west of Tháp Chàm, via Phu Quy to Phuoc Huu and the village Hau Sanh; this tower is undergoing extensive renovation (July 2012).

The towers are currently used for the very colorful Cham festivals, particularly "Kate festival" in October (15 Oct in 2012) when they still sacrifice a bullock and other food offerings. Other ceremonies for Ramadan, a Rain Festival (as required), weddings and other celebrations are also held. Apart from the incorporation of Islam into their cultural and religious practice, another point of cultural difference is that their heredity line is maternal. The animist foundation of Cham culture, with fire motif on the towers, rustic traditions and very colorful ceremonial dress makes the Cham culture an ideal tourist resource for Vietnam, as yet poorly developed.

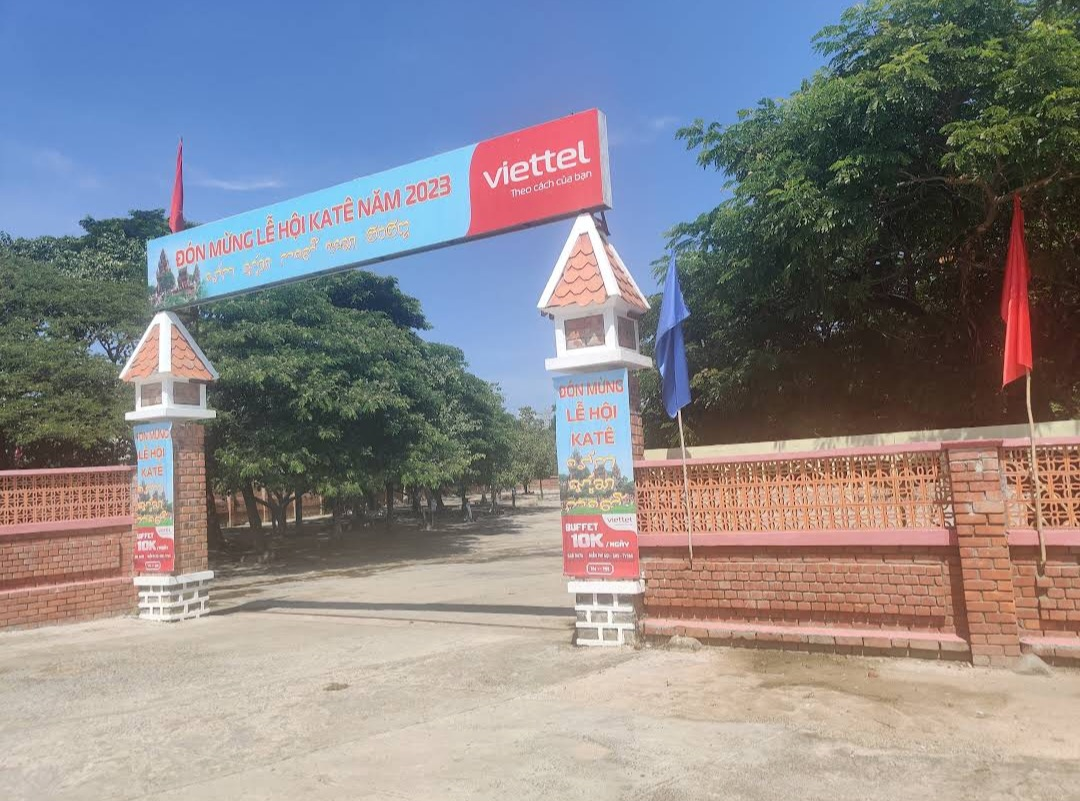
Entrance gate to Po Klong Garai temple during Kate festival (2023)

Architecturally, the towers feature detailed brickwork constructed from small red bricks with very fine mortar lines, resembling dry-stone masonry. They are capped by calyx-like minarets, while the arches are outlined with specially molded bricks featuring tongue-like extensions designed to represent flames. This intricate masonry reflects a high level of engineering sophistication required to support the structural overhangs.

Associated with the Po Klong Garai complex is a cultural center built with concrete, bricks, mortar, and render. Its design incorporates elements of Cham architecture, and the facility houses a display of cultural artifacts, handicrafts, photographs, and paintings by Cham artists.

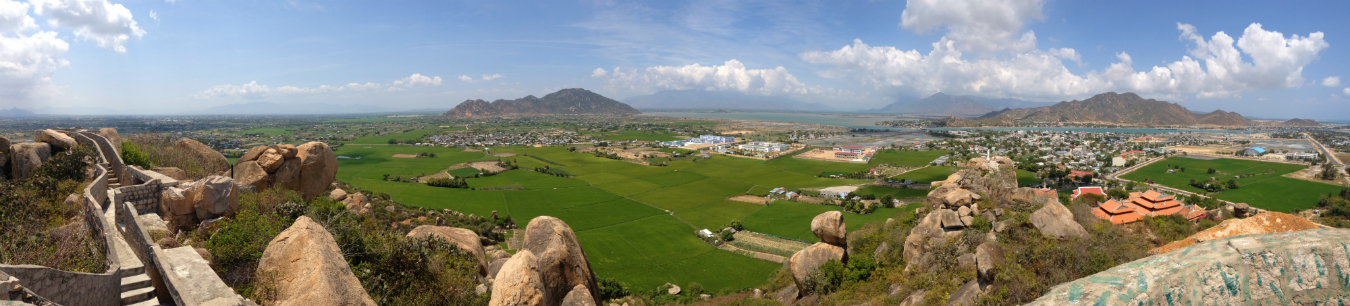
Phan Rang Look Out

=== Cuisine ===
- Grilled rice paper is a snack originating from Phan Rang, then widely spread in Da Lat, Phan Thiet and popular in Ho Chi Minh City.
- Banh Can is a popular dish of Phan Rang, originating from the cuisine of the Cham, later further developed by the Vietnamese and widely spread in the South Central region.

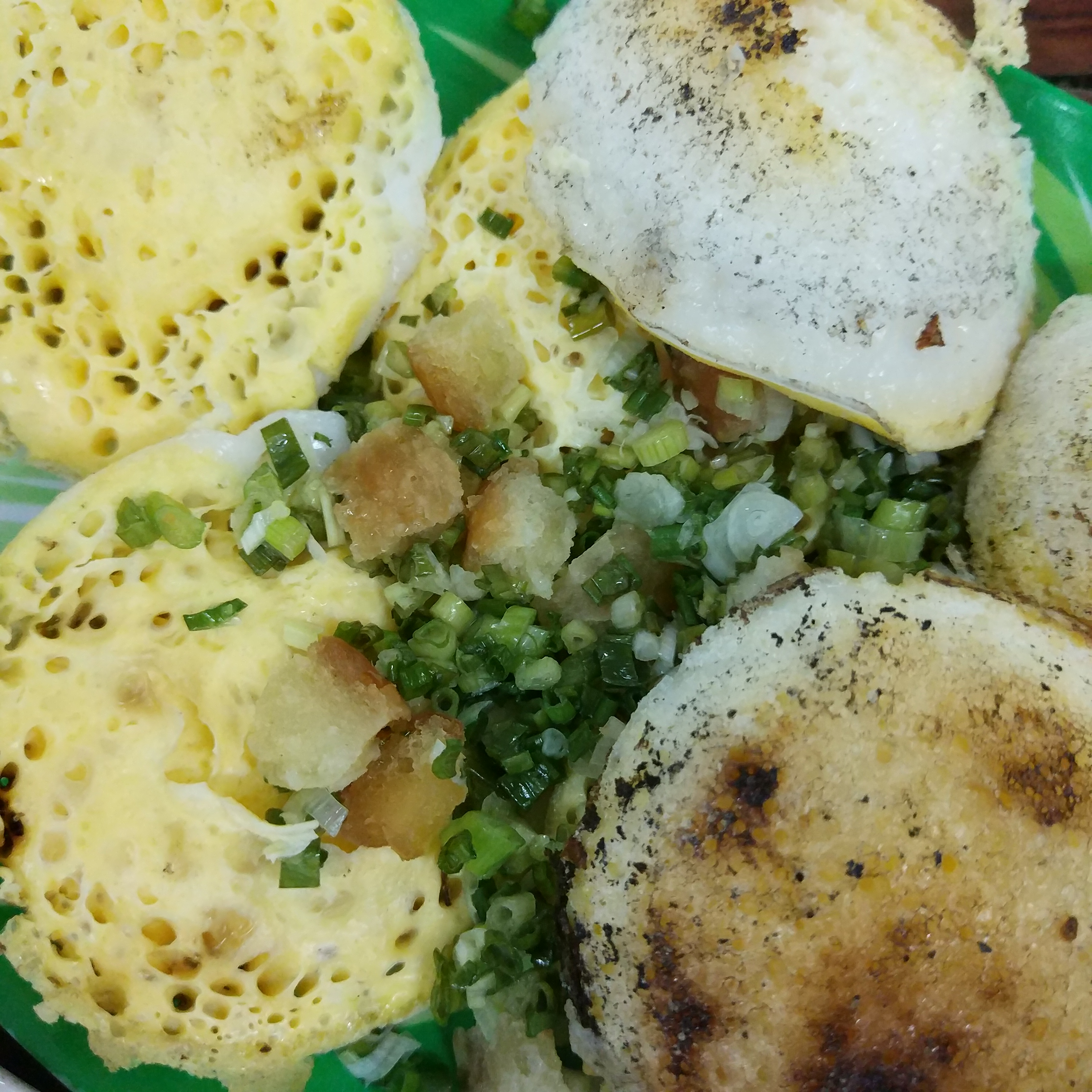
Bánh căn in Phan Rang

== Tourist attractions ==
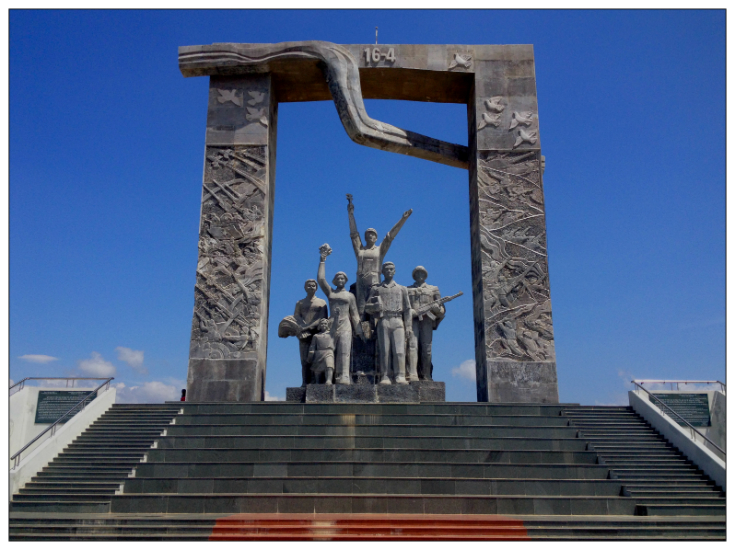
16 April Park Monument, Phan Rang

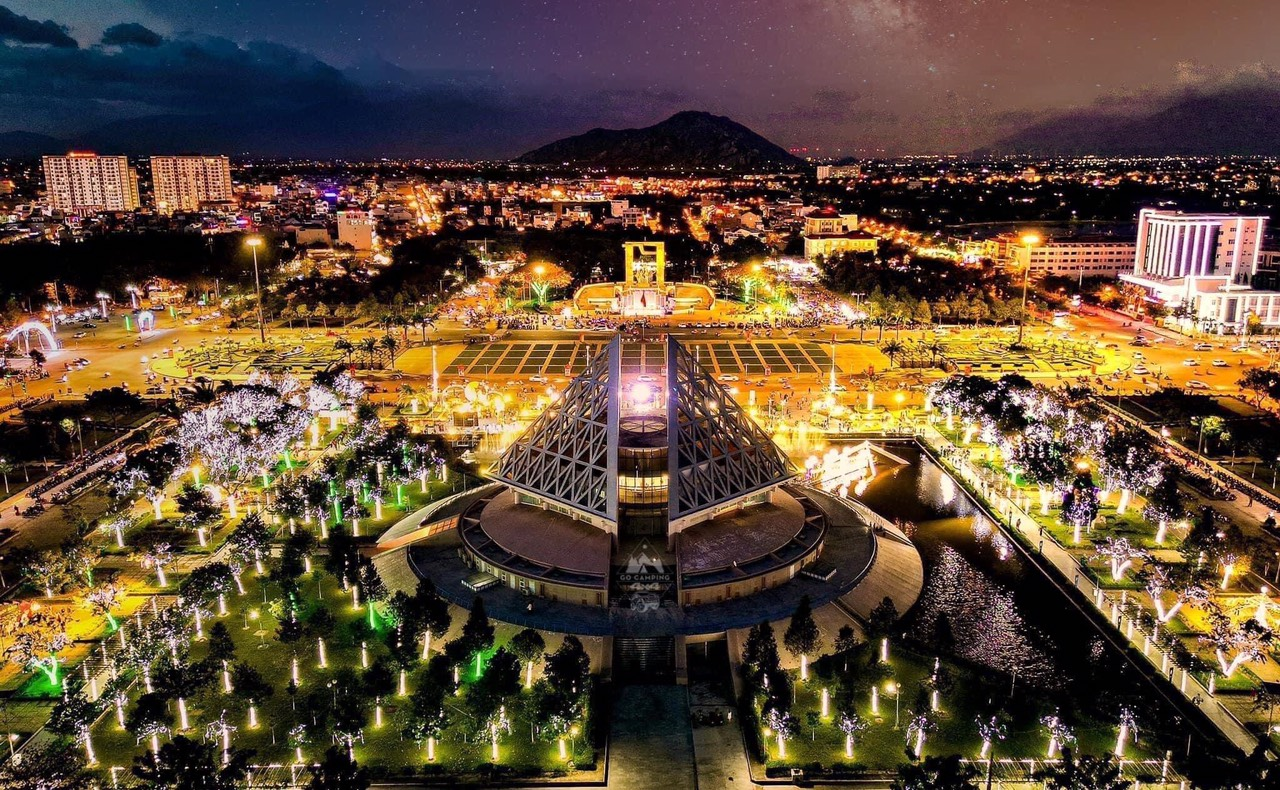
Phan Rang square at night

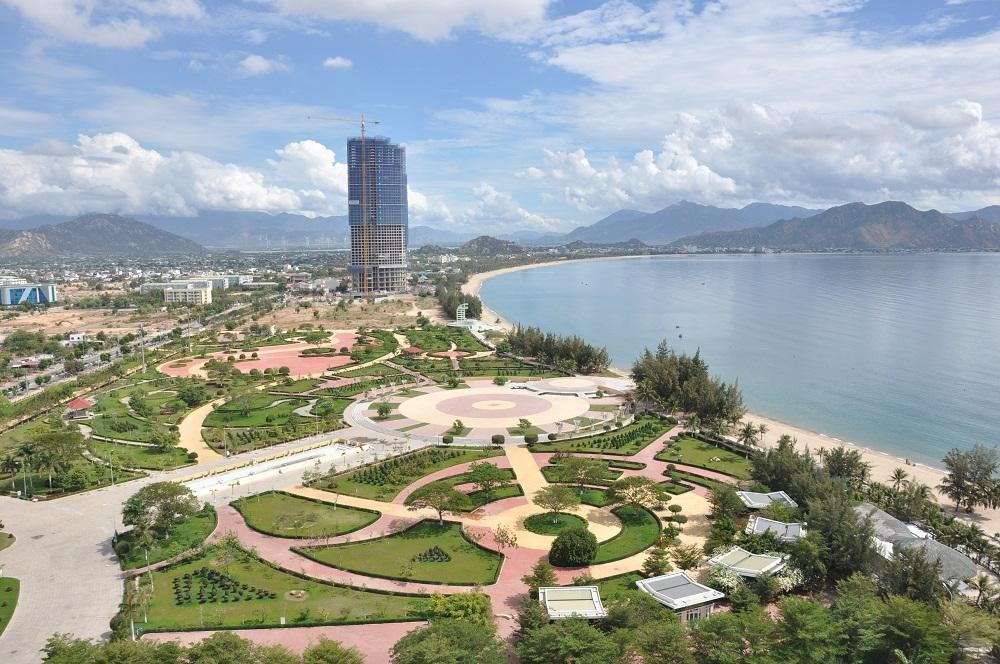
Binh Son sea park - Phan Rang beach

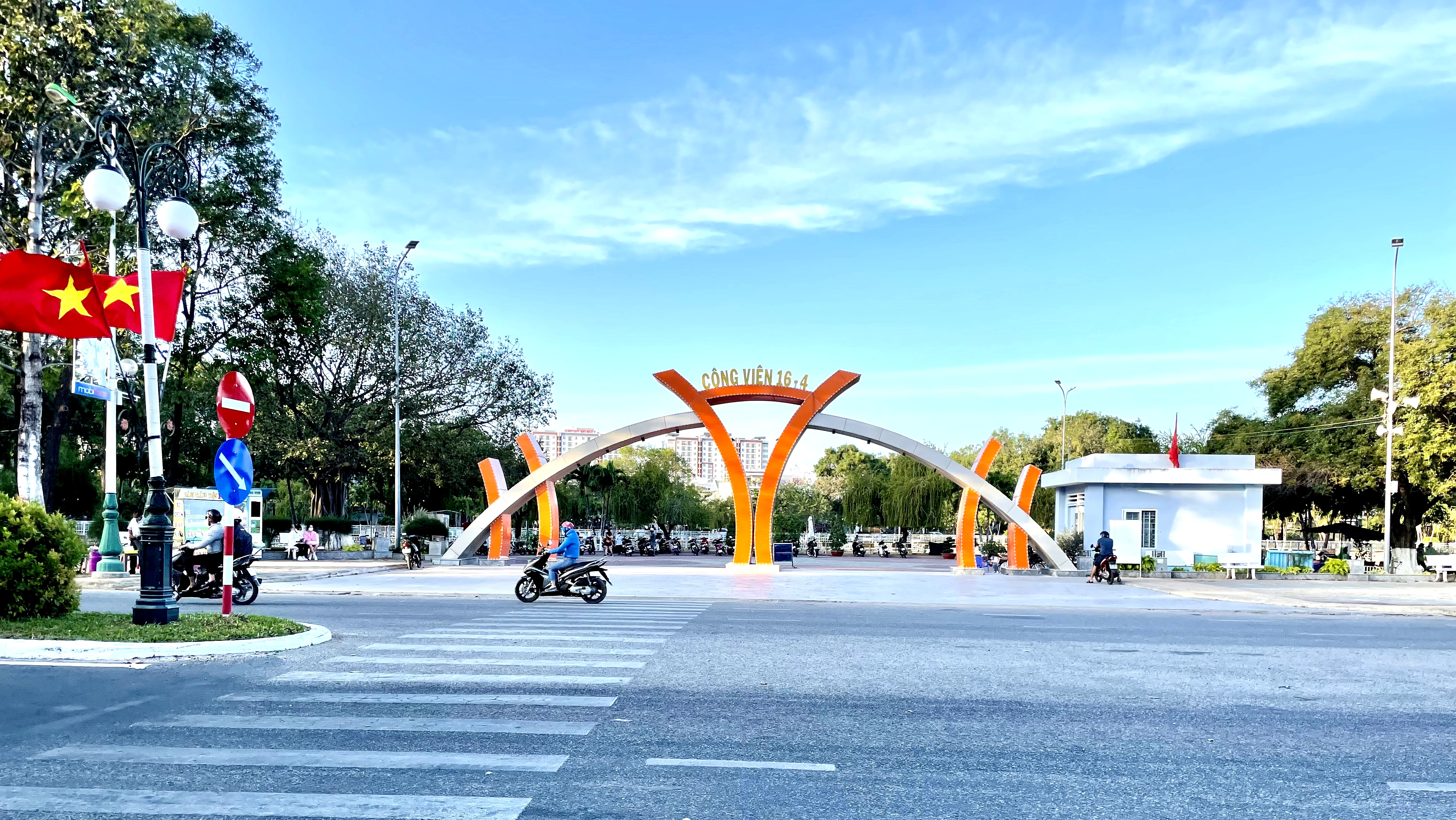
16th April Park

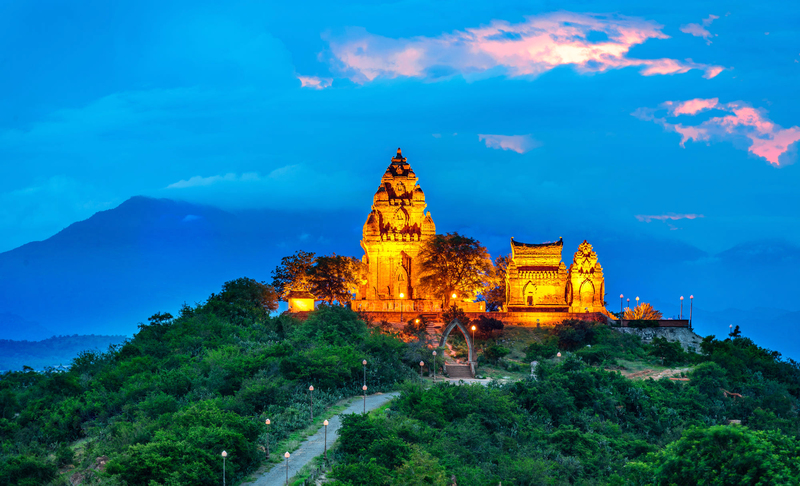
Po Klong Garai tower complex at sunset

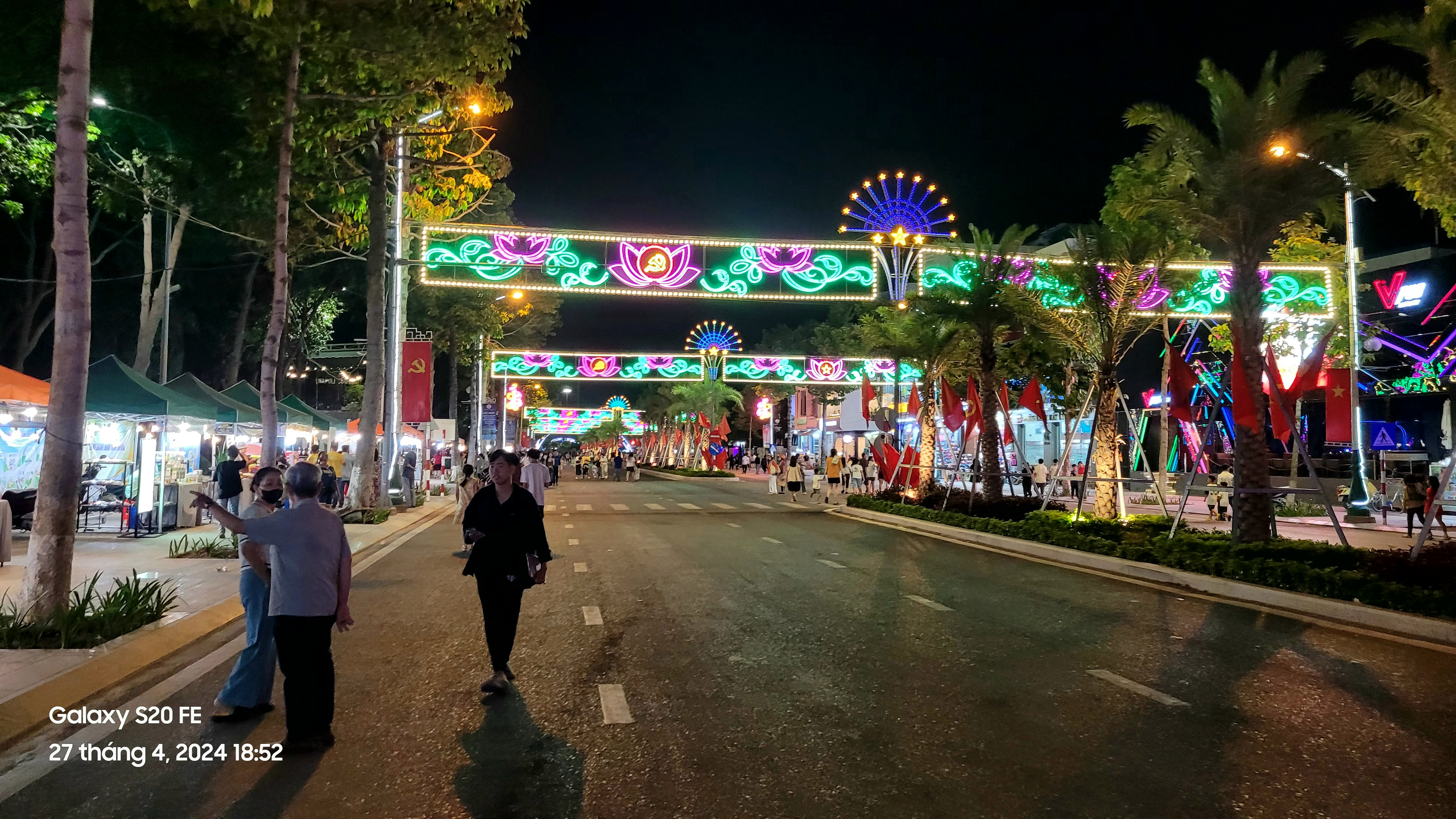
Phan Rang walking street

== Sport ==
Ninh Thuan Stadium, also known as Phan Rang Stadium, is a multi-purpose stadium located near Phủ Hà roundabout, Phước Mỹ ward. The stadium has a capacity of 16,000 spectators. This is also the home stadium of Ninh Thuan Football Club in 2012.

== Transport ==
=== Road ===
Phan Rang–Tháp Chàm is located at the junction of National Routes 1A and 27; the former connects the city to Hanoi towards the north and Ho Chi Minh City to the south-west, while the latter crosses into the Central Highlands towards Buôn Ma Thuột.

=== Air ===
The city does not have its own airport with the nearest airport located in the neighbouring province of Khánh Hòa. Cam Ranh International Airport is approximately 59 km from the city.

=== Railway ===
The city is connected to the North–South Railway at Tháp Chàm Railway Station; express passenger trains (SE1/2, SE5/6) stop regularly at the station. Getting to or from the Tháp Chàm Station 21 Thang 8 connects Tháp Chàm to Phan Rang. Local buses go west (7 km ride) to Phan Rang bus terminal, near the Phan Rang market. The Phan Rang terminal is the hub for local and distance buses. Local buses go to Phu Quy and Phuoc Huu (12 km) for the Po Rome tower or the beach resorts (5 km). Taking the opposite direction (west) on 21 Thang 8, 1 km gets to the Po Klong Garai towers and cultural center. Mini-buses to Da Lat (2.5hr. trip) pick up passengers from a Tháp Chàm booking office on 21 Thang 8 between the intersection and railway crossing, however, passengers can more reliably get seats at the Phan Rang terminus.

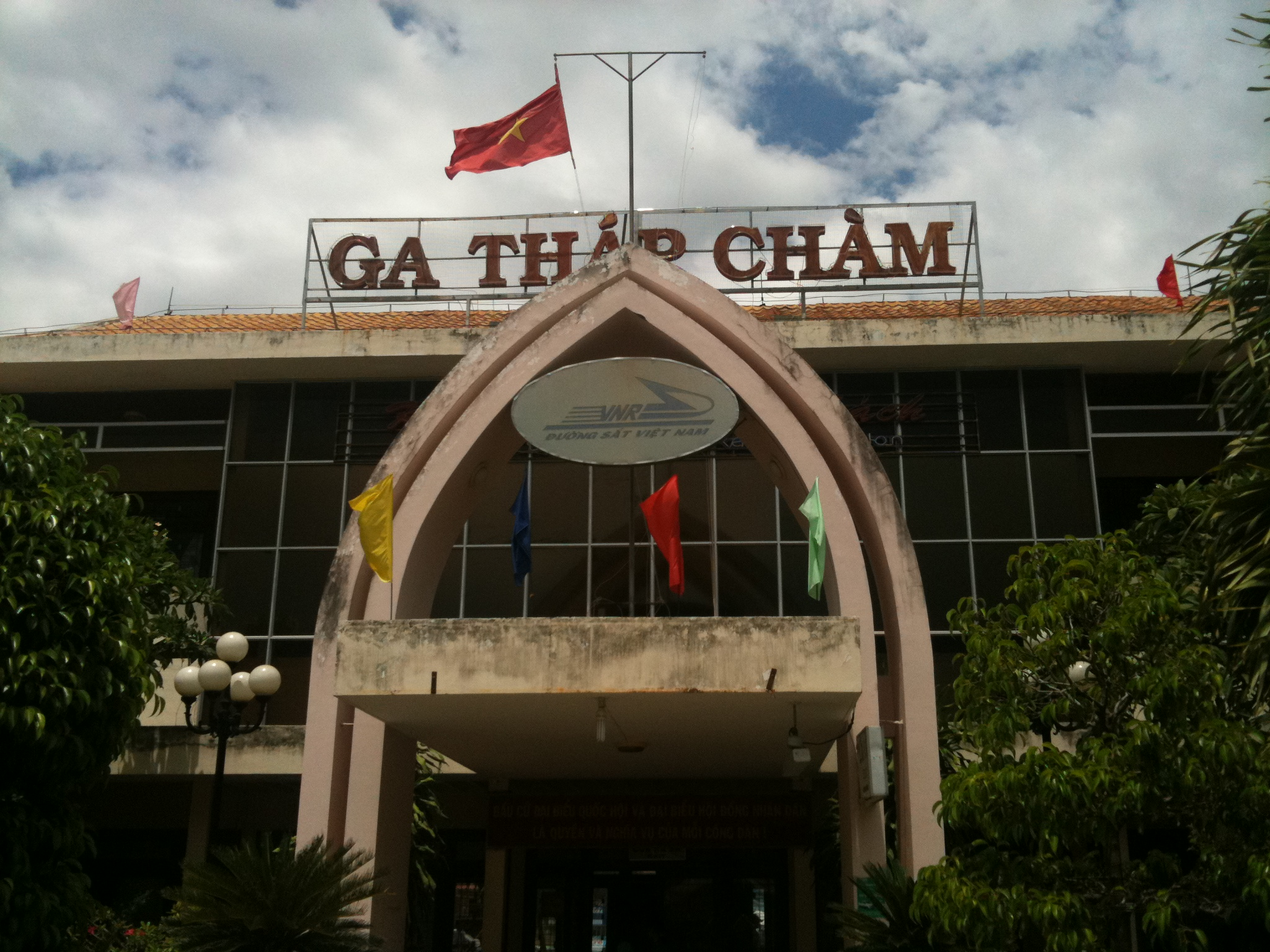
Tháp Chàm railway station

==== Đà Lạt–Tháp Chàm Railway ====
The station once served as a terminus for the Đà Lạt–Tháp Chàm Railway, a rack railway which opened in 1932. The railway was abandoned during the Vietnam War and dismantled after the North Vietnamese victory in 1975, to provide materials for the restoration of the heavily damaged north–south line. A proposed renewal project, backed by provincial and local governments, aims to restore the entire Đà Lạt–Tháp Chàm railway to handle both passenger and cargo transportation.

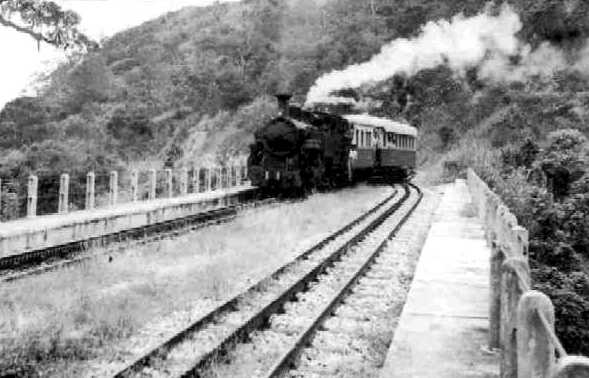
A locomotive travelling on the Thap Cham-Da Lat railway line.

== Healthcare ==
- Phan Rang–Thap Cham City Medical Center
- Saigon Phan Rang General Hospital
- Ninh Thuan Provincial General Hospital
- Ninh Thuan Provincial Eye Hospital

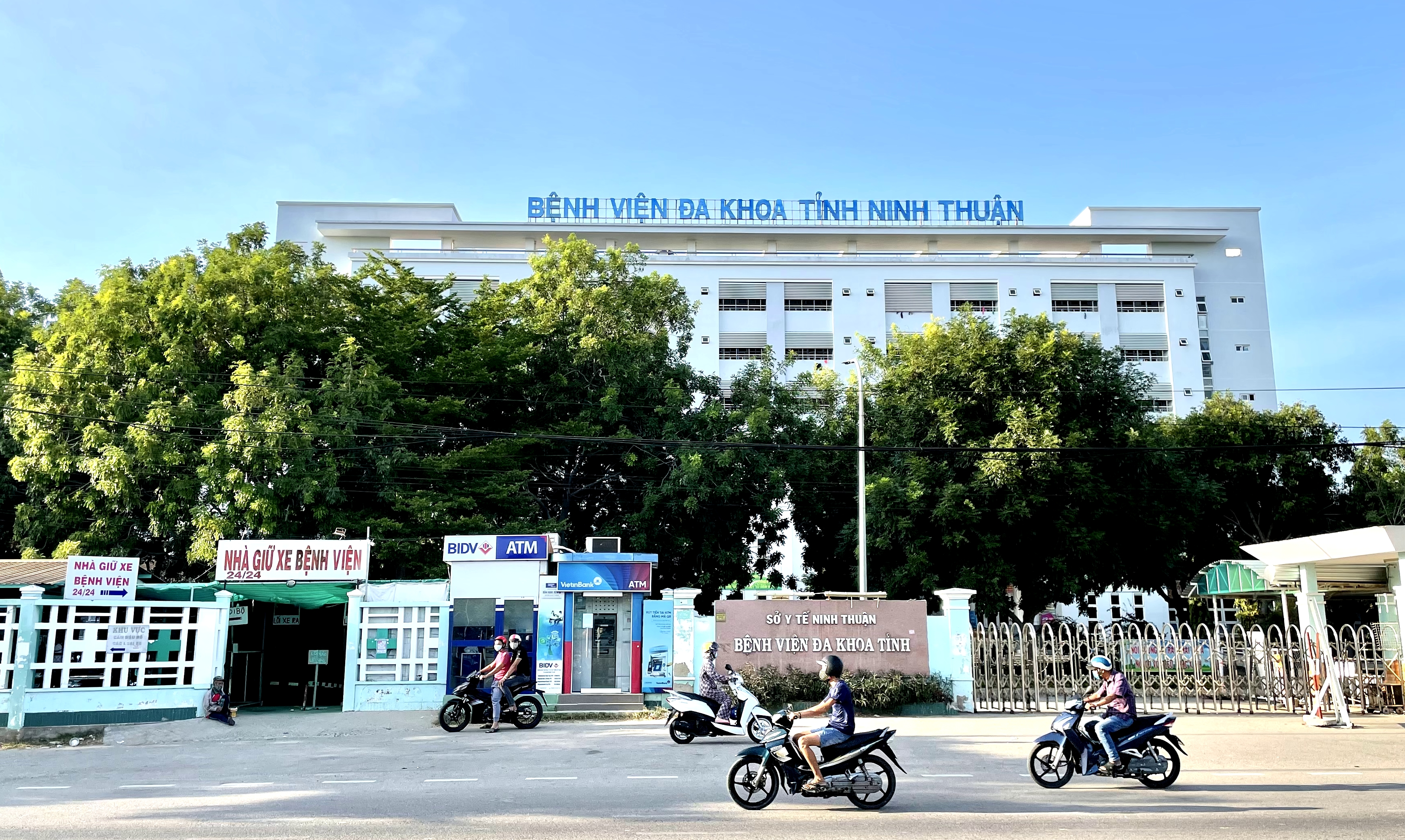
Ninh Thuan Provincial General Hospital in Van Hai Ward

== Education ==
In the city, there are 155 educational institutions from preschool to lower secondary school level. There are 7 high schools.

=== College, university ===
- Ninh Thuan Medical Intermediate School.
- Ninh Thuan Vocational College.
- Water Resources University - Central Institute of Training and Applied Science.

== Notable residents ==
- Po Klong Garai – king of Panduranga from 1167 to 1205
- Nguyễn Văn Thiệu – former President of South Vietnam from 1967 to 1975
- Al Hoang (Hoàng Duy Hùng) – former member of the Houston City Council and first Vietnamese American member
