= Raju (disambiguation) =

Raju may refer to:

- Raju, a Telugu caste of India

== People ==
Raju is an Indian male given name, a hypocorism of Raja, Raj and other Indian names beginning with "Raj".

- A. V. S. Raju (1937–2026), Indian businessman
- Aalap Raju, Indian playback singer
- Alluri Sita Rama Raju, Indian independence movement activist
- AVS Raju, Indian businessman
- Byrraju Ramalinga Raju, Indian businessman, founder-chairman of Satyam Computer Services Ltd.
- Captain Raju (1950–2018), Indian film actor in Malayalam cinema
- Dil Raju, Indian film producer in Telugu cinema
- Gopal Raju, Indian-American editor and journalist
- Kolanka Venkata Raju, Indian musician, mridangam player
- Krishnam Raju, Indian film actor and politician
- M. S. Raju, Indian film producer in Telugu cinema
- M. Venkataraju, Indian film music director
- Maniyanpilla Raju, Indian film actor and producer in Malayalam cinema
- Manohar Raju, Indian-American lawyer and politician, Public Defender of San Francisco
- Manthena Venkata Raju, Indian politician and social worker
- P. Raju, Indian politician
- Pallam Raju, Indian politician
- Pusapati Vijayarama Gajapati Raju, Maharaja of Vizianagaram and Indian parliamentarian
- Pusapati Ashok Gajapati Raju, Indian politician, cabinet minister, Member of Parliament
- Prabhas Raju Uppalapati, Indian film actor in Telugu cinema
- Raju Ananthaswamy, Indian music director
- Raju Baruah, member of United Liberation Front of Assam in northeastern India
- Raju Bhatt (Baroda cricketer), Indian cricket player from Baroda cricket team
- Raju Gaikwad, Indian football player
- Raju Kher, Indian film actor in Hindi cinema
- Raju Narisetti, Indian businessman
- Raju Peddada, Industrial and graphic designer
- Raju Rai, Indian-American badminton player
- Raju Sundaram, Indian film actor, director and choreographer in Tamil cinema
- Raju Shetti, Indian politician
- Raju Shrestha alias Master Raju, Indian film and television actor in Hindi cinema
- Raju Srivastav, Indian standup comedian
- Raju Tamang, Nepalese football player
- Ram Gopal Varma, Indian film director, screenwriter and producer in Hindi and Telugu cinema
- S. M. Raju, Indian civil servant
- Srini Raju, Indian businessman
- T. V. Raju, South Indian music director
- Venkatapathy Raju, Indian cricketer, left arm spin bowler
- Yosri Derma Raju, Malaysian football player
- Raju, a fictional character portrayed by Akshay Kumar in the Indian comedy film series Hera Pheri
  - Akshay Kumar (born as Rajiv Hari Om Bhatia), Indian actor, sometimes nicknamed Raju
- Raju Ustad, a fictional villain portrayed by Danny Denzongpa in the 1974 Indian film Chor Machaye Shor
- Raju, a fictional character portrayed by Sudeepa in the 2018 Indian film Raju Kannada Medium
- Raju, a fictional character in the Indian animated series Chhota Bheem

== Others ==
- EML Raju, Estonian Navy patrol vessel
- MMA Raju, an Estonian mixed martial arts promotion
- Raju (film), a 2011 short film
- Raju, Iran, a village in Iran
- Alternative pronunciation of Naju, a city in South Jeolla Province, South Korea.

== See also ==
- 1st Rank Raju (disambiguation)
- Raja (disambiguation)
- Raraju (disambiguation)
