= King of Kings (disambiguation) =

King of Kings is a lofty title applied to monarchs or deities.

King of Kings may also refer to:

== Films ==
- The King of Kings (1927 film), American silent epic film produced and directed by Cecil B. DeMille
- King of Kings (1961 film), American epic religious film directed by Nicholas Ray
- The King of Kings (1963 film), Czechoslovak comedy film directed by Martin Frič
- King of Kings, a 1969 Hong Kong film starring Peter Yang
- Motu Patlu: King of Kings, 2016 Indian animated action thriller film directed by Suhas D. Kadav
- The King of Kings (2025 film), American animated Christian film directed by Seong-ho Jang

== Games ==
- King of Kings: The Early Years, a video game by Wisdom Tree
- King of Kings (1988 video game), a video game by Namco
- a supplement to the Rome at War board wargame series

== Music ==
- King of Kings (Don Omar album), a 2006 album by reggaeton artist Don Omar
- King of Kings (Leaves' Eyes album), a 2015 album by symphonic metal band Leaves' Eyes
- King of KingZ, a 2001 album by German-Tunisian rapper Bushido
- "King of Kings", a 1963 song by Jimmy Cliff
- "King of Kings", a heavy metal song from Gods of War (Manowar album)
- "King of Kings", a song by Motörhead released on the WWE Wreckless Intent compilation
- "King of Kings", a song from Flowers (Echo & the Bunnymen album)
- "King of Kings", a song from Rock City (Royce da 5'9" album)
- King of Kings (Hillsong song), a song from Hillsong Worship
- "Purrp the King of Kings", a song by SpaceGhostPurrp from Blackland Radio 66.6: Pt 2 - Episode 1

== Other ==
- King of Kings, a reference to Jesus Christ
- Henrik Larsson, a former professional footballer most noted for his time at Celtic F. C.
- King of Kings (horse), an Irish Thoroughbred racehorse and sire
- King of Kings (statue), a 2004 statue of Jesus in Monroe, Ohio
- "King of Kings", a nickname for professional wrestler Triple H
- "King of Kings", a verse from Percy Shelley's poem, Ozymandias
- King of Kings Tournament 1999, a series of mixed martial arts events held by Fighting Network Rings (RINGS)
- King of Kings Tournament 2000, a series of mixed martial arts events held by Fighting Network Rings (RINGS)
- King of Kings, the second novel in the Warrior of Rome series by Harry Sidebottom
- King of Kings (kickboxing), European kickboxing promotion
- King of Kings, the thirty-seventh episode in Part 5 of JoJo's Bizarre Adventure: Golden Wind
- RRQ (esports) (Rex Requm Qeon), an Indonesian esports club known by the nickname "King of Kings"
- King of Kings, a brand of disposable E-Cigarettes

== See also ==
- High King (disambiguation)
- King of All Kings (disambiguation)
- Shahenshah (disambiguation), Persian title, literally "king of kings"
- Rajadhi Raja (disambiguation) and Rajadhi (disambiguation), Indian title, literally "king of kings"
- Samrat (disambiguation), Indian title, literally "king of all"
- Maharaja (disambiguation), title of Indian kings, literally "great king"
- Chakravarti (disambiguation), title for an emperor in ancient India, literally "universal ruler"
- Adipati (disambiguation), Sanskrit title, literally "high king"
- Raraju (disambiguation), various Indian films, literally "king of kings"
