= High King (disambiguation) =

A high king is a type of king ranked above other monarchs. High King may also refer to:

- High-King, a Japanese pop idol group
- High King Mountain Ski Area, a ski resort in Austria
- High King of Ireland, a historical title
- Hochkönig (English: High King), the highest mountain in the Berchtesgaden Alps, Austria
- The High King, a 1968 novel by Lloyd Alexander
- The High Kings, an Irish folk band

== See also ==
- Halls of the High King, a Dungeons & Dragons module
- The High King's Tomb, a 2007 novel
- Adipati (disambiguation), Sanskrit title, literally "high king"
- King of Kings (disambiguation)
- Maharaja (disambiguation), title of Indian kings, literally "great king"
