= ICGS Sankalp =

Indian offshore patrol vessel

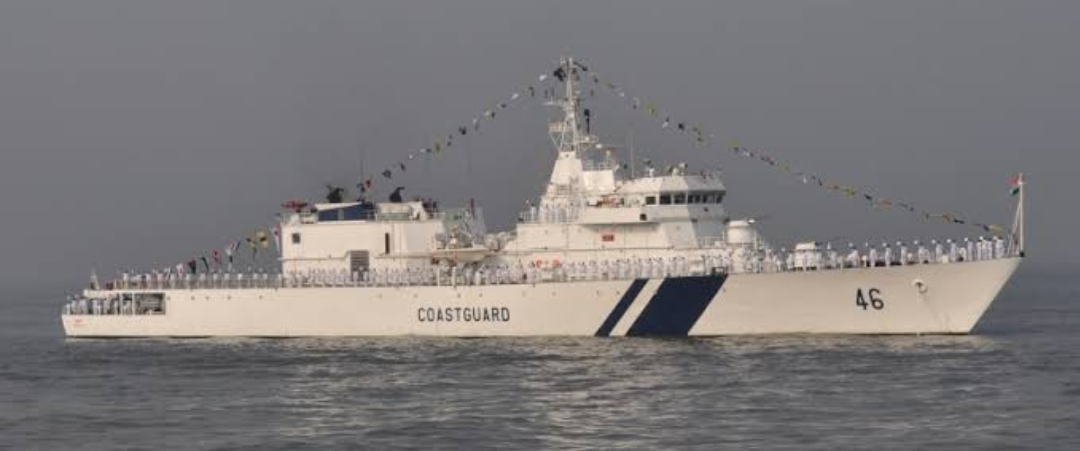

History

India
- Name: ICGS Sankalp
- Owner: Indian Coast Guard
- Builder: Goa Shipyard Limited
- Laid down: 17 July 2004
- Launched: 28 April 2006
- Commissioned: 20 May 2008
- Identification: IMO number: 4558940; Pennant number: CG46
- Motto: Extending the Horizon
- Status: in active service

General characteristics
- Class & type: Sankalp-class offshore patrol vessel
- Displacement: 2,230 short tons (2,020 t)
- Length: 105 m (344 ft 6 in)
- Beam: 12.9 m (42 ft 4 in)
- Draught: 3.6 m (11 ft 10 in)
- Propulsion: 2 × SEMT Pielstick 20 PA6B STC diesel engines (20,900 PS, 15,400 kW)
- Speed: 23.5 knots (43.5 km/h; 27.0 mph)
- Range: 6,500 nmi (12,000 km; 7,500 mi) at 12 kn (22 km/h)
- Boats & landing craft carried: 5 high speed boats
- Complement: 128 including 15 officers
- Sensors & processing systems: Raytheon surface search radar
- Armament: 2 × 30 mm CRN-91 naval gun; 2 × 12.7 mm machine guns
- Aircraft carried: HAL Dhruv or HAL Chetak

ICGS Sankalp (lit. Resolution) is the first ship of her class. The vessel is classified as a Patrol boat/ Advanced Offshore Patrol Vessel. She was built by Goa Shipyard Limited and commissioned by A. K. Antony on 20 May 2008.

== Construction ==
The keel of ship was laid on 17 July 2004 and launched on 28 April 2006. The ship was commissioned on 20 May 2008 by then Defence Minister A. K. Antony.

== Operational history ==
In December 2014, Sankalp had undertaken a goodwill visit of 32 days to Singapore, Australia and Indonesia as part of international cooperation through exchange of information and bilateral exercises.

She has participated in many rescues, fire fighting missions. She has also deployed oversea in various countries such as Sri Lanka, Maldives, Oman, Qatar, Australia, Singapore.

== See also ==
- ICGS Samrat
- ICGS Vishwast
- Vishwast-class offshore patrol vessel
- Vikram-class offshore patrol vessel
