= Barom Reachea =

Barom Reachea may refer to:

- Barom Reachea I, Cambodian king who reigned from 1566 to 1576
- Barom Reachea II (1579–1599), Cambodian king ruled from 1597 to 1599
- Barom Reachea III (1599–1600), Cambodian king ruled briefly in 1600
- Barom Reachea V (1628–1672), Cambodian king reigned from 1658 to 1672
- Barom Reachea VII, Cambodian king who ruled from 1603 to 1618

== See also ==
- Borommarachathirat (disambiguation)
