= Samrat =

Samrat or Samraat may refer to:

== Film ==
- Samrat (1954 film), a Bollywood film directed by Najam Naqvi starring Ajit Khan
- Samraat (film), a 1982 Indian Hindi-language film directed by Mohan Segal starring Dharmendra
- Samrat (1994 film), an Indian Kannada-language film directed by Naganna as Vishnuvardhan
- Samrat (1997 film), an Indian Tamil-language film directed by Sakthi Chidambaram (as C. Dinakaran) starring Ramki
- Samraat: The King Is Here (2016 film), a Bangladeshi film directed by Shamim Ahamed Roni starring Shakib Khan

== Other uses ==
- Samrat (name), a given name and surname
- Emperor, in Sanskrit samraat or samrat
- ICGS Samrat, an Indian Coast Guard advanced offshore patrol vessel

== See also ==
- Sarmat (disambiguation)
- King of All Kings (disambiguation), literal translation of samrat
