= Battle of Minicoy Island =

Single ship action in January 2011

- Part of Piracy off the coast of Somalia
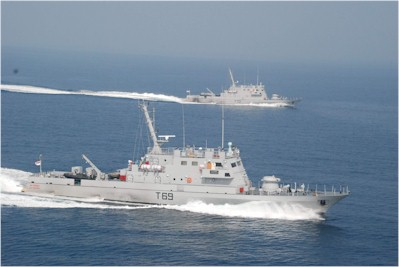
- Car Nicobar-class patrol vessel
Date	28 January 2011
Location	Off Minicoy Island, Indian Ocean
Result	Indian victory

Belligerents
India	Somali pirates

Commanders and leaders
Arun Bahuguna	Usman Salad

Strength
1 patrol vessel	1 trawler

Casualties and losses
None	10 killed 15 captured 1 trawler sunk
- 20 hostages rescued

The Battle of Minicoy Island was a single ship action in January 2011 between Indian naval forces and Somali pirates, during Operation Island Watch. Pirates in the former Thai fishing trawler Prantalay 14 resisted and attacked the Indian Navy patrol vessel INS Cankarso and, in a long surface action off Minicoy Island, the Indians sank the hostile ship and rescued twenty captives.

== Background ==
Prantalay 14 had operated as a pirate mothership in the Indian Ocean for several months before her sinking. After its capture, its Thai owners refused to pay a ransom for the return of the ship and its crew and four of its original crewmembers died of starvation while the crew was kept hostage by the pirates.

== Battle ==
Early in the morning of 28 January, Indian Coast Guard Dornier 228 aircraft on a routine patrol detected two skiffs and Prantalay 14 chasing the Bahamian container ship MV Verdi 300 miles (480 km) west of the Lakshadweep Islands. The pirates in the skiffs spotted the aircraft and immediately abandoned the attack and sailed back to Prantalay 14. The aircraft reported the sighting and three Indian Navy ships were dispatched, including the 325-ton INS Cankarso, a Car Nicobar-class patrol vessel under the command of Commander Arun Bahuguna. Cankarso was armed with a 30-millimeter CRN 91 naval gun and two 12.7-millimeter machine guns. A few hours after receiving the Coast Guard's report Cankarso found Prantalay 14 about 100 nautical miles (190 km; 120 mi) north of Minicoy. Cankarso's radioman tried to contact the pirates, but was ignored, so a warning shot was fired towards the pirates, who returned fire with rocket propelled grenades and AK-47s. An exchange of fire commenced and lasted for twelve hours before shots from the CRN 91 heavily damaged the trawler.

Indian Navy press release about the operation, 29 January 2011.

Fuel drums that were stowed on the upper deck ignited and Prantalay 14 began to burn. At that point the survivors abandoned ship so the Indians ceased firing. Thirty-five men went into the water, of whom fifteen were pirates and twenty were Thai and Myanmar sailors on the vessel when the pirates captured it. Ten pirates were killed in the engagement, and the rest were taken to Mumbai in Cankarso as prisoners. There are no indications that any Indian sailors were harmed. Mumbai Police have confirmed that they have registered a case against the pirates for attempt to murder and various other provisions under the Indian Penal Code and Foreigners Act after entering national waters without authorization. Prantalay 14 burned for hours before sinking, during which INS Kalpeni and the Coast Guard ship ICGS Sankalp arrived and assisted in rescue operations. A week or so later, the Indian training ship INS Tir captured Prantalay 11, another former Thai trawler which had been captured by pirates.

Indian Navy press release about the operation, 6 February 2011.

== Aftermath ==
The Indian commander, Arun Bahuguna was awarded the Nau Sena Medal for his role in the engagement. The captured pirates were taken to India for trial where they were charged with kidnapping, kidnapping for ransom, attempted murder, and weapons related offenses. As none of the pirate's former hostages appeared as witnesses, the pirates were acquitted of kidnapping for ransom and sentenced in August 2017 to seven years imprisonment on the remaining charges. The pirates had spent six and a half years in prison prior to their sentencing.

== See also ==
- List of ships attacked by Somali pirates
