= Po Nraup =

- King of Champa; King of Panduranga

King of Champa
- Reign: 1652–1653
- Predecessor: Po Rome
- Successor: Po Saktiraydapaghoh
- Born: ? Hamu Barau, Champa
- Died: 1653; Băl Canar, Panduranga, Champa (in present-day Phan Rí Cửa, Tuy Phong District, Bình Thuận Province, Vietnam)
- Burial: Hamu Barau, Champa
- Issue: Xác Bà Ân
Names
- Po Nraup; Nik Ibrahim

Po Nraup (?–1653), also spelled Po Nrop, who has been hypothesized as having the Muslim name Sultan Nik Ibrahim Bin Nik Mustafa (Jawi: سلطان نئ إبراهيم بن نئ مصطفى) alias Po Brohim, was the king of Panduranga Champa who ruled from 1652 to 1653. In Vietnamese records, he is mentioned as Bà Thấm or Bà Tấm (婆抋). His short reign was marked by a ruinous war with the southern Vietnamese which cost Champa half of its territory.

== Background ==
Po Nraup was a half-brother of Po Rome, born from the same mother in a year of the Ox (1601, 1613 etc.). His mother was a Churu, his father was a Cham from the village Hamu Barau. According to historical traditions from Kelantan in Malaysia, a Nik Ibrahim was the son and successor of the Champa ruler Nik Mustafa who has been identified with Po Rome. Nik Ibrahim might therefore be Po Nraup although the exact details differ. When Po Rome was killed after a confrontation with the Vietnamese in 1651, he succeeded as the king of Champa after a brief interregnum.

== War with Đàng Trong and loss of Kauthara ==
The Vietnamese chronicle Đại Nam thực lục mentions a catastrophic war with the Nguyễn ruler of Đàng Trong in 1653. The King of Champa, who is here called Bà Tấm, brought his army trespassing into Phú Yên, trying to drive the Viet people out of this area. The Nguyễn lord Nguyễn Phúc Tần, however, reacted swiftly. He sent 3000 soldiers under Colonel Hùng Lộc to attack Champa. The great army crossed the Hổ Dương Pass through the Thạch Bi Mountain and struck against an important citadel under the cover of darkness. In a lightning attack the citadel was torched and destroyed. Bà Tấm fled towards the south but was able to hold the land to the south of the Phan Rang River. He then dispatched his son Xác Bà Ân who presented a letter of surrender to the victors. Nguyễn Phúc Tần accepted this and took hold of the Cham region Kauthara, i.e. all the territories north of the Phan Rang River. These corresponded to Khánh Hòa and part of Ninh Thuận provinces. A garrison was established in Tái Khang with the victorious officer Hùng Lộc as protector. The remaining Champa kingdom was required to send tribute to the Nguyễn.

== Fate ==
The Vietnamese sources do not specify what became of Bà Tấm or Po Nraup. Indigenous Cham tradition does not clearly mention his war with Vietnam, but paints a dark picture of him as an unintelligent figure. Since his birth he had an senseless fear of cats. One night, he heard one of his children making noise and mistook him for a cat, cutting off his head. When realizing what he had done, he died of shame and grief. He was buried in his home village Hamu Barau. At any rate, Po Nraup died shortly after the crushing defeat, in 1653, leaving his country in chaos. After his demise, the Vietnamese briefly appointed two vassal kings to rule Champa in 1654–1659. Later, Po Saut came to the throne (1660) and eventually revolted against Vietnamese.

Preceded by Po Rome 1627–1651	Champa rulers 1652–1653	Succeeded by Po Saktiraydapaghoh 1654–1657
