= Po Aih Khang =

King of Champa (d. 1622)

- King of Champa; King of Panduranga

King of Champa
- Reign: 1618–1622
- Predecessor: Po Jai Paran
- Successor: Po Klaong Mah Nai
- Born: Champa
- Died: 1622; Băl Canar, Panduranga, Champa (in present-day Phan Rí Cửa, Tuy Phong District, Bình Thuận Province, Vietnam)
- Father: Po Jai Paran

Po Aih Khang (died 1622) was a King of Panduranga in Champa. The name is also spelt Po Eh Khang. He reigned in the period 1618-1622 (or, according to some chronicles, 1613–1622).

All information about Po Aih Khang comes from later historical chronicles, such as Mangbalai and Sakkarai dak rai patao. He was the son of the preceding ruler Po Jai Paran and resided in Bal Pangdurang alias Bal Canar (Tinh My village, Phan Ri). The Mangbalai chronicle, which gives metaphoric descriptions of the Cham kings, says: "Then there is seen a man comparable to a cock, grand, tall, enormous, and with a male beauty. Then reigns Po Aih Khang". The king was remembered as an esteemed person, just and righteous.

Some accounts place a Patau Dam, "the young king", between Aih Khang's predecessor and successor, so that it is probably question of one and the same person. This Patau Dam was (just like Po Aih Khang) born in the Year of the Rat (1588, 1600, etc.), and is the subject of a romantic story. He once left the palace at night and moved around incognito, meeting an orphaned girl with whom he fell in love. The girl did not see his face clearly in the dark and did not know he was the king. Later, when she visited the palace to complain to the king about an act of oppression, she recognized the king among all the court nobles by the touch.

Po Aih Khang was the last ruling member of the Po Klaong Halau dynasty. The next ruler Po Klaong Mah Nai appears to have usurped the throne in 1622.

Preceded by Po Jai Paran 1613–1618	Champa rulers 1618–1622	Succeeded by Po Klaong Mah Nai 1622–1627
