= Rama (Kings of Thailand) =

Thai royal title in English

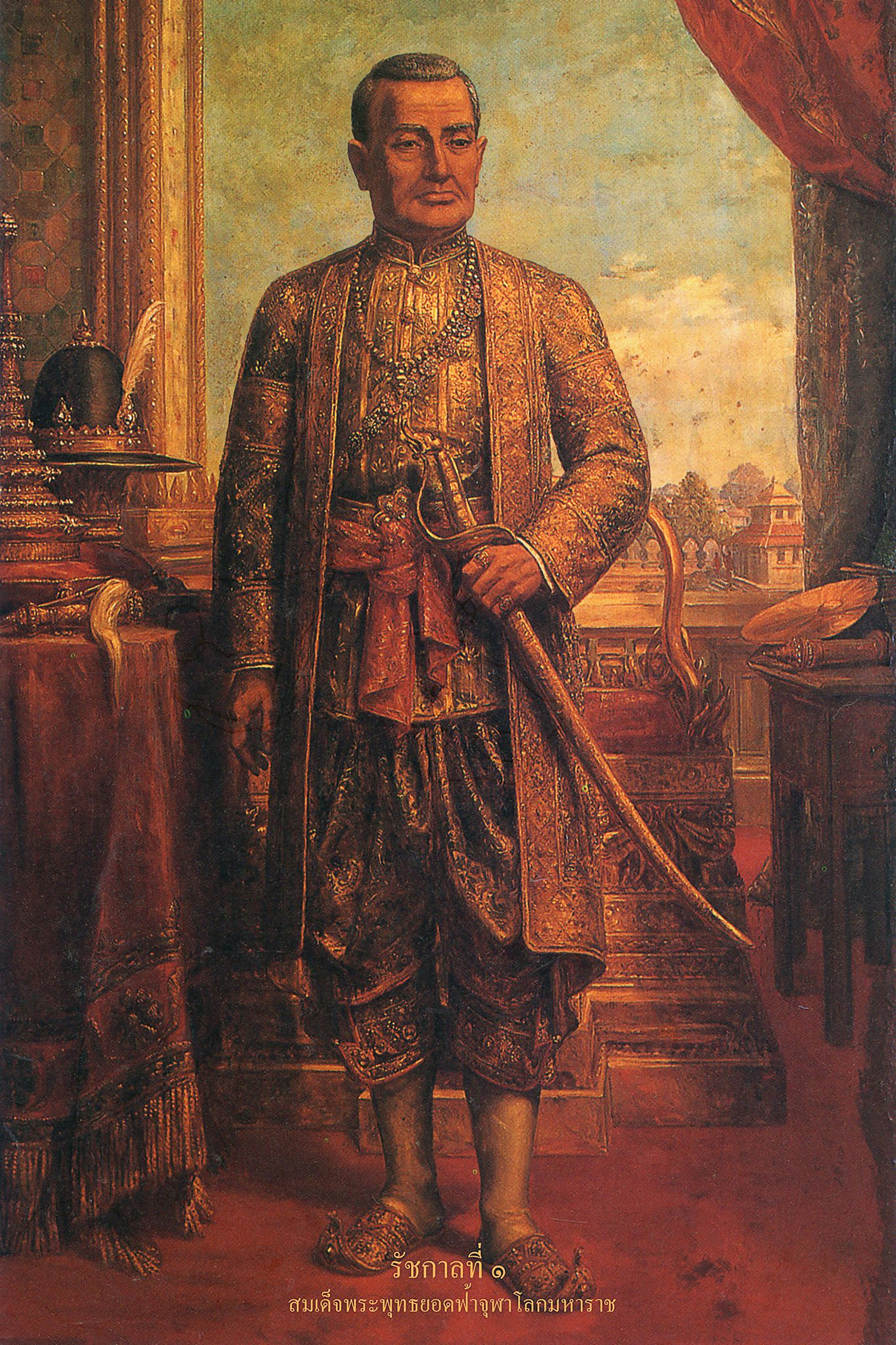
King Rama I

All kings in the current Chakri dynasty of Thailand are often referred to as King Rama in the English-speaking world. The name Rama was adopted from the name of the Hindu God Rama, an avatar of Vishnu.

The use of the name "King Rama nth" is in line with Thai practice of giving numbers to the king in the current dynasty. However, the translation was not exact and can give rise to some confusion as to whether this was actually the name adopted by the king on his coronation.

== History ==
While "Rama" was used as a title for all the kings, it was not always taken on as the name. In the present dynasty, the first king to call himself Rama was Phra Mongkutklao or King Vajiravudh, who was the sixth to reign. His reigning title was Phra Mongkutklao Chaoyuhua (พระมงกุฎเกล้าเจ้าอยู่หัว); later in his reign, he preferred to style himself as Phra Ram thi Hok (พระรามที่หก, lit. 'Rama VI'). It was presumed that he was influenced by the European practice of numbering the rulers with similar names while he studied in England.

Quite conveniently, it coincided with another practice of the Thai people. Traditionally, the name of the king is sacred and would not normally be said. Instead, people would refer to the king by other words, currently Nai Luang (ในหลวง) or Phra Chao Yu Hua (พระเจ้าอยู่หัว). When King Phutthayotfa Chulalok founded the dynasty, he was commonly referred to as Phan Din Ton (แผ่นดินต้น, lit. 'the First Reign'); and when his son King Phutthaloetla Naphalai inherited the throne, he was referred to as Phan Din Klang (แผ่นดินกลาง, lit. 'the Middle Reign'). That then became awkward when Prince Chetsadabodin (King Nangklao) became the third king, as the obvious referral would then be Phan Din Plai (แผ่นดินปลาย, lit. 'the Last Reign'), which did not sound very auspicious.

He decided to give the names "Phutthayotfa Chulalok" and "Phutthaloetla Naphalai", after the names of two Buddha statues, to his two predecessors. He was then posthumously given the name "Nangklao" by his successor, King Mongkut, who also tried to establish more systematic royal nomenclature. Later historians would refer to King Nangklao's reign as Ratchakan thi Sam (รัชกาลที่ 3, lit. 'the third reign'). That was becoming more common, probably because of Western influences on Thailand during the reigns of Mongkut and his son, Chulalongkorn. Since then, all the reigns of kings in the dynasty are also known unofficially as Ratchakan thi n ('the nth Reign'); hence, the present King's reign is also known as Ratchakan thi sip ('the tenth reign') and extrapolated back to all the earlier kings of the dynasty.

Since King Vajiravudh called himself Rama VI in English, the name was seemingly equivalent to Thai Ratchakan thi hok. This rough translation is still in use today, but no other king in the dynasty before him used the name "Rama" as such.

However, there have been several kings in the Ayutthaya and Thonburi periods who are best known by the title Ramathibodi ("Overlord Rama"). Ayutthaya itself was borrowed from the name of Rama's capital in the Ramayana epic, Ayodhya. Still, most of the names of the earlier kings as given by historians are titles rather than real names. It was not customary to refer to a king by his name during his lifetime, and in many cases, the personal names of the kings are not known. Even the titles are often doubtful. Each king had his full style and title inscribed on a golden plate, which, however, were all lost when the Ayutthaya Kingdom was destroyed in the sack of the city by the Burmese in 1767.

== Chakri Kings of Thailand ==
- King Rama I (1782–1809), Phutthayotfa Chulalok (27 years)
- King Rama II (1809–1824), Phutthaloetla Naphalai (14 years)
- King Rama III (1824–1851), Nangklao (26 years)
- King Rama IV (1851–1868), Mongkut (17 years)
- King Rama V (1868–1910), Chulalongkorn (42 years)
- King Rama VI (1910–1925), Vajiravudh (15 years)
- King Rama VII (1925–1935), Prajadhipok (9 years)
- King Rama VIII (1935–1946), Ananda Mahidol (11 years)
- King Rama IX (1946–2016), Bhumibol Adulyadej (70 years)
- King Rama X (2016–present), Vajiralongkorn (10 years)

== See also ==
- Monarchy of Thailand
- List of Thai monarchs
- Regnal name
