= Po Saut =

- King of Champa; King of Panduranga

King of Champa
- Reign: 1659–1693
- Predecessor: Po Jatamah
- Successor: Po Saktiraydapatih
- Born: ? Champa
- Died: 1694; Đàng Trong, Đại Việt
- Issue: Po Thuntiraidaputih
Names
- Po Saut; Wan Daim
- Father: Po Saktiraydapaghoh
- Mother: Po Mul, daughter of Po Rome

Po Saut (?–1694), also spelled Po Saot or Po Sot, sometimes known as Wan Daim, was the king of Panduranga Champa who ruled from 1660 to 1693. In Vietnamese records, he was mentioned as Bà Tranh (婆爭). He was also the last king of independent Champa.

== Biography ==
According to the Cham chronicles, Po Saut was a son of king Po Saktiraydapaghoh, his mother Po Mul being a daughter of Po Rome. He was of Churu and Rhade parentage via his mother. He was a Muslim; in 1685, he requested a copy of the Quran from Father Ferret, a French missionary serving in Champa. A Cham manuscript provides the following cryptic characterization of his reign: "Subsequently a man comparable to a sledge is seen, taking the Banis [Muslims] across there, having a size similar to a bronze hanrang [?]. He constantly summoned the turtledoves [the people] to make them embrace the Muslim faith. Bodies and souls fall to the others. Then Po Saut was king."

After 1653, Champa paid tribute to the realm of the Vietnamese Nguyễn clan, Đàng Trong, but was still fully autonomous. Champa came however into conflict with Vietnam after the death of the relatively inefficient Đàng Trong ruler Nguyễn Phúc Trăn (1691) and the accession of his adolescent son. Po Saut aimed to gain back the Phan Rang region which had been lost to the Vietnamese Nguyễn lord in 1653. Hostilities began in 1692 but Champa was conquered by Vietnamese general Nguyễn Hữu Cảnh in the first month of 1693. Po Saut was captured seven months later and transferred to Phú Xuân (present-day Huế). In there, Nguyễn Phúc Chu gave him a royal pardon. He died early in the next year, and the Nguyễn lord paid for his funeral.

The Nguyễn appointed his lieutenant and brother Po Saktiraydapatih as successor. He left a son who became ruler of the Cham polity in 1731 under the name Po Thuntiraidaputih.

Preceded by Po Jatamah 1657–1659	Champa rulers 1660–1693	Succeeded by Po Saktiraydapatih 1695–1727
