= Raraju =

Raraju (lit. 'King of Kings') may refer to:

- Raraju (1984 film), Indian Telugu-language film
- Raraju (2006 film), Indian Telugu-language film

== See also ==
- King of Kings (disambiguation)
- Raju (disambiguation)
