= 1st Rank Raju =

1st Rank Raju may refer to these Indian comedy films:

- 1st Rank Raju (2015 film), a Kannada film
- 1st Rank Raju (2019 film), a Telugu film, remake of the 2015 film

== See also ==
- Raju (disambiguation)
