= Po Klong M'hnai =

King of Champa (d. after 1627)

- King of Champa; King of Panduranga
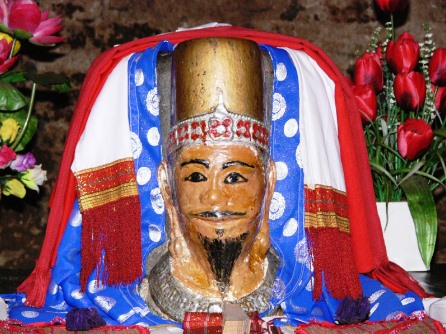
- Statue of Po Klong M'hnai in the clan temple.

King of Champa
- Reign: 1622–1627
- Predecessor: Po Aih Khang
- Successor: Po Rome
- Born: ? Champa
- Died: after 1627; Băl Canar, Panduranga, Champa (in present-day Phan Rí Cửa, Tuy Phong District, Bình Thuận Province, Vietnam)
- Spouse: Bia Som
- Issue: Bia Than Chih
Names
- Po Maha Taha; Po Klaong Mah Nai

Po Klong M'hnai (d. after 1627), also spelled Po Klong Menai or Po Klău Manai, was a king of Panduranga Champa, ruling from 1622 to 1627. His short reign is mainly known from later historical traditions, but seems to have been important in terms of demographic and cultural changes.

== Accession and reign ==
He was a Cham officer with the noble rank Maha Taha, and did not belong to the royal family. He was either a Muslim or pro-Muslim and was posthumously commemorated as a Sultan.

Information about Po Klong M'hnai is sparse, but historian Keith Taylor has surmised that he killed his predecessor, the Hindu king Po Aih Khang, in 1622 and seized the throne. He chased off visiting Jesuits who had started proselytizing in mainland Southeast Asia by this time. In the years 1622 to 1630, Dutch merchant ships were attacked by "Malay" soldiers in South China Sea; actually it has been assumed that they were attacked by Chams rather than Malays.

== Migrations and religious rivalries ==
The kingdom had experienced losses against the Nguyễn lords in 1611, and the decline of the coastal Cham population increased the importance of upland tribes in the Cham polity. The Cham Mangbalai manuscript speaks about an influx of immigrants: "Rahan, Khmers, Chinese, Vietnamese, and Takan, migrated in masses to our kingdom which retrieved its capital." It is not certain what is meant with Rahan and Takan. Another passage has a metaphoric description of the king: "Then is seen a man comparable to a large tree, old, without leaves, nevertheless giving good shade. The people and the Banis (Muslims) owe their happiness to this tree. Then Po Mah Taha reigns." All this would suggest a period of restoration and increase of manpower. However, other Cham traditions assert that antagonistic relations emerged between the Bani (Muslim) and Kafir (Hindu) groups. The chaos resulting from the bitter rivalry was only resolved by the next king, Po Rome.

According to Cham historical tradition, Po Klaong Mah Nai wished to abdicate his throne after a short reign. By his queen Bia Som, he only had a daughter, and looked around for a male successor. His chief astrologer pointed out a young man who tended the king's buffaloes, Po Rome. He was elevated to the throne and married to the old ruler's daughter Bia Than Chih. This occurred in 1627. Some accounts identify Po Rome as a Churu chief, underlining the increasing role of upland ethnicities in Cham society.

It is not known how long the ex-ruler lived after his abdication. The Po Klaong Mah Nai grave monument is situated in Thuan Luong, Phan Rí, about 15 km from Bắc Bình District, Bình Thuận Province. He is posthumously known as Sulatan Ya Inra Cahya Basupa (Sultan Jaya Indra, splendour of the Puspa flower).

Preceded by Po Aih Khang 1618–1622	Champa rulers 1622–1627	Succeeded by Po Rome 1627–1651
