= Po Saktiraydapaghoh =

- King of Champa; King of Panduranga

King of Champa
- Reign: 1654–1657
- Predecessor: Po Nraup
- Successor: Po Jatamah
- Born: ? Champa
- Died: 1657; Bal Pangdurang (Phan Rí)
- Spouse: Po Mul
- Issue: Po Saut; Po Saktiraydapatih; daughter, consort of Po Jatamah

Po Saktiraydapaghoh (died 1657), sometimes known as Po Phiktirai da Paghuh, original name Phik Cak, was a King of Champa who ruled from 1654 to 1657 as a tributary of the Nguyễn lord of Quangnam.

== Biography ==
The life and reign of Po Saktiraydapaghoh is only known from later Cham sources. According to historical tradition he was a prince, originally named Phik Cak, who married Po Mul, a daughter of king Po Rome. Supposedly, he became a traitor and colluded with the Nguyễn lord Nguyễn Phúc Tần to assist Vietnamese expansion. He thus manipulated Po Rome's female diviners to tell the king to fell a sacred trunk of an ironwood tree that protected the Champa kingdom in order to restore the health of the Vietnamese royal consort Bia Ut. Legend has it that Po Rome was subsequently abandoned by the protective deities of Champa, and was as a result defeated and captured by a Vietnamese invading army (1651). Vietnamese sources, on the other hand, only mention a Nguyễn invasion in 1653, at the time of Po Rome's brother and successor Po Nraup. After the invasion, which cost Champa its northernmost territory, Phik Cak was elevated to the throne in 1654 under the name Po Saktiraydapaghoh. He was ordained by the Nguyễn ruler and obliged to send tribute to his court in Kim Long (present Huế). The Cham Mangbalai manuscript, which gives cryptic and metaphorical characterizations of the Cham kings, mentions a king Po Nasuor, supposedly the same as Po Saktiraydapaghoh, and provides an ambiguous opinion: "Then arrived a man comparable to the white elephant, without protection, who only strikes with the trunk and the feet. The souls and bodies are dispersed at the horizon. Then Po Nasuor reigns."

He did not survive for long, however, but died in 1657 under unknown circumstances. He was succeeded by his son-in-law Po Jatamah.

Preceded by Po Nraup 1652–1653	Champa rulers 1654–1657	Succeeded by Po Jatamah 1657–1659
