= Rajadhi =

Rajadhi may refer to:

- Rajadhiraja ("king of kings"), an Indian royal title, also rendered maharajadhiraja ("great king of kings")
- Sri Rajadhi Rajasinha of Kandy, King of Kandy in 1782
- Rajadhi Raja (1989 film), a 1989 Tamil film
- Rajadhi Raja (1992 film), a 1992 Kannada film
- Rajadhi Raja (2009 film), a 2009 Tamil film
- Rajadhi Raja (2014 film), a 2014 Malayalam film

== See also ==
- Rajadhi Raja (disambiguation)
- King of Kings (disambiguation)
