= Nightmare Keep =

Tabletop role-playing game adventure

- Code: FA2
- Rules required: Advanced D&D
- Character levels: 18-20
- Campaign setting: Forgotten Realms
- Authors: Rick Swan
- First published: 1991

Linked modules
- FA1 FA2

Nightmare Keep (ISBN 1-56076-147-4) is an adventure module for the fictional Forgotten Realms campaign setting for the second edition of the Advanced Dungeons & Dragons fantasy role-playing game.

== Contents ==
The 64-page booklet is wrapped in a removable gatefold cover. The adventure takes place in the Veilstone Peaks northwest of Cormyr, 50 miles west of the Farsea Marshes. It takes place after the Time of Troubles and the death of the god Bane.

- Background: Icelia of the Witches of Rashemen desired to extend her dominion over the world. Now exiled, her insatiable lust for power has turned her into a demilich. In her secret tower, Icelia has spawned an army of horrors that will soon be ready to be unleashed.
- Prologue: Flies and Lizards: The player characters are summoned by Balko Verdemeer, an emissary of the King Azoun IV of Cormyr. A strange, evil-looking insect was found near the Veilstone Peaks, next to the mutilated bodies of a man and a horse. The king wants the party to discover if there are more insects like this, and to destroy them. There is a hefty reward of gold and land. No adventurer has yet returned from the Peaks.
- Chapter 1: Squirrels and Wasps: The party explores the poor villages around the Veilstone Peaks. The party hears rumors about the good magician Amry Wolover and nearby Wolover's Keep. Wolover has not been seen for some time. While exploring the tower, the party encounters monsters and a strange orange mist in the basement.
- Chapter 2: Goldfish and Turtles: The party arrive in a large cavern of jagged walls, filled with bats. A stone bridge stands high above an underground lake. While exploring this dark labyrinth, the party learns the fate of some of their predecessors.
- Chapter 3: Leeches and Butterflies: The party ventures deeper into the maze, where they find the remains of more unlucky adventurers, and one arrogant survivor who is willing to trade information grudgingly. This second area is dark and chilly and smells of rotting meat. The party is assaulted by insects, oozes, shadows, and various undead. Slowly, they learn of Icelia's evil plans and how she means to achieve them.
- Chapter 4: Spiders and Worms: On the final level of the labyrinth, the party arrives inside the cold, petrified husk of an enormous creature. Large ducts and organs filled with strange fluids are connected by valves. The party discovers the haunted spirit of Amry Wolover, who tells them the true horror of Icelia and the spawning grounds of her unholy army. Finally, the party challenges the demilich Icelia and her ghostly companion Zhorach.

This module includes a fold-out color poster map of the labyrinth.

== Publication history ==
The book, with product code TSR 9341, was published in 1991, and was written by Rick Swan, with cover art by Brom and interior art by Valerie Valusek and Terry Dykstra.

== Reviews ==
- C64 Fun
