= Po Jai Paran =

King of Champa (d. 1618)

- King of Champa; King of Panduranga

King of Champa
- Reign: 1613–1618
- Predecessor: Po Nit
- Successor: Po Aih Khang
- Born: ? Champa
- Died: 1618; Băl Canar, Panduranga, Champa (in present-day Phan Rí Cửa, Tuy Phong District, Bình Thuận Province, Vietnam)
- Father: Po Klaong Halau

Po Jai Paran (died 1618) was a King of Panduranga in Champa. He reigned in the period 1613-1618 (or, according to some chronicles, 1601–1606).

== Biography ==
Like the other Cham kings in this era, Po Jai Paran (or Jai Puran) is known from later historical chronicles, such as Mangbalai and Sakkarai dak rai patao. He was the younger son of the founder of the dynasty, Po Klong Halau and brother of King Po Nit. It is possible that he is the brother of the king mentioned by the Dutch visitor Cornelis Matelief de Jonge in 1607. According to the Dutch, the king at the time was still heathen, i.e., Hindu, while the brother desired to convert to Islam but did not dare for fear of the king's displeasure.

Po Jai Paran succeeded his brother Po Nit in a year that is usually given as 1613, incidentally simultaneously with the accession of his northern neighbour Nguyễn Phúc Nguyên. The chronicles tell very little about him, except that he was likened to a forest bird who always hid under bamboo groves and reed. It is not clear what this means. Whether he actually became a Muslim is not known. If he acceded in 1613 he must have been faced with the consequences of the unlucky war with the Vietnamese Nguyễn lord two years earlier.

At his death in 1618 (or 1606), Po Jai Paran was succeeded by his son Po Aih Khang according to some of the chronicles. Other versions, however, mention a long interregnum of seven years before Po Aih Khang was enthroned. However, such interregnum (1606–1613) is not mentioned in Matelief de Jonge's travel account in 1607. The tomb of Po Ja Paran is found at the large dune (gahul) of Phan Rí (Parik).

Preceded by Po Nit 1603–1613	Champa rulers 1613–1618	Succeeded by Po Aih Khang 1622–1627
