= Po Jatamah =

- King of Champa; King of Panduranga

King of Champa
- Reign: 1657–1659
- Predecessor: Po Saktiraydapaghoh
- Successor: Po Saut
- Born: ? Champa
- Died: 1659; Bal Pangdurang (Phan Rí)
- Spouse: daughter of Po Saktiraydapaghoh

Po Jatamah (died 1659) was a King of the Panduranga Kingdom of Champa who ruled from 1657 to 1659.

His exact origins are not known, but he was able to gain the throne after the short-lived Po Saktiraydapaghoh since he was married to his daughter.

This occurred although the deceased king had at least two sons, who later became kings.

The succession indicates the strength of the matrilinear system of the Chams.

The new king was ordained by the Nguyễn lord of Annam and received the governing title Ndo Naok Ndai Tang Kuan.

Champa had lost the northern region, from Cù Mông to Kauthara (Khánh Hòa), to the Nguyễn lord in 1653, and the Cham rulers henceforth had to pay tribute.

However, they were still autonomous. During Po Jatamah's brief reign, important events happened in the immediate surroundings of Champa. The Cambodian ruler Ramathipadi I was a Muslim and kept his position with the help of Cham and Malay soldiers.

In 1658 he was, however, defeated and captured through a Vietnamese invasion.

He died in Champa in the next year as he was about to return to Cambodia.

The Nguyễn regime now established its authority in the easternmost territory of Cambodia, later known as Biên Hòa.

This became a severe challenge for the Cham rump kingdom in Panduranga, since it now had the Vietnamese both to the north and the south. Po Jatamah died shortly after these events, in 1659. He was succeeded by his brother-in-law Po Saut.

Preceded by Po Saktiraydapaghoh 1654–1657	Champa rulers 1657–1659	Succeeded by Po Saut 1659–1693
