= Po Klong Halau =

King of Champa (d. 1603)

- King of Champa; King of Panduranga

King of Champa
- Reign: 1579–1603
- Predecessor: Po At
- Successor: Po Nit
- Born: ? Champa
- Died: 1613; Băl Canar, Panduranga, Champa (in present-day Phan Rang, Ninh Thuận province, Vietnam)
- Burial: Hamu Tanran
- Issue: Po Nit; Po Jai Paran
- Religion: Hinduism

Po Klong Halau or Po Klaong Haluw (? - died 1603) was a king of Panduranga in Champa. The Cham chronicles assign to him a long reign from 1579 to 1603 (although some text versions date him in 1567–1591). Although the native chronicles do not say much about him, foreign sources suggest that this was a period of intense political and military activity for Champa.

== Establishment of a new dynasty ==
The last ruler of the preceding dynasty, Po At, had a doubtful reputation and left the old Cham capital Byuh Bal Batthinang (Cham Phu Nhuan village, Phan Rang), perhaps for fear of Vietnamese inroads. At his demise in 1579, Po Klong Halau took the throne under unclear circumstances and founded a new dynasty. Spanish sources say that the Cham king reigning in the 1590s was a usurper, suggesting a violent dynastic shift. He also established a new capital, Bal Pangdurang or Bal Canar (near Chung My village, Phan Rang). The capital was moved further south to Parik (Phan Rí) by his successor, presumably to stay clear of the Vietnamese Nguyễn lords. Very little is said about his character in Cham sources, although he was obviously a person of importance. They only assert that he was a refined man with a masculine beauty. Vietnamese sources say that the Chams sent an embassy to the court of Nguyễn Hoàng in 1602, to conclude an alliance with the southern Vietnamese of Đàng Trong.

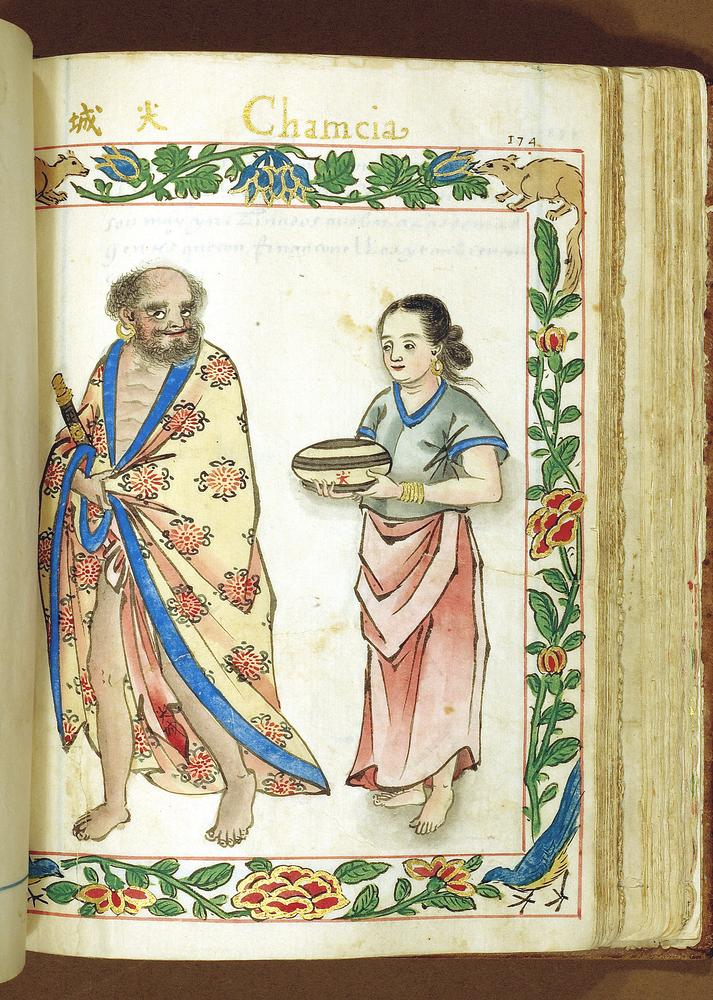
A Cham couple in the Boxer Codex, c. 1595.

== Sea raiding and Muslim connections ==
European sources, on the other hand, make frequent references to Cham activity in the late 16th and early 17th century. Iberian writers based in the Philippines have a highly negative opinion about the Chams, who were notorious sea raiders who attacked European and Asian shipping in the South China Sea and also took Europeans as slaves. Their king was considered a pirate from a European point of view, and usually cruised around with a large fleet. It was even proposed by some Spaniards that Champa should be attacked and subjugated. This was the more urgent since the Cham ruler assisted the Spanish-Portuguese king's enemies in the Malay World: "The king of Johor being at war with Malacca about five years ago [in 1594], the said king of Champa sent him aid, and otherwise assisted him considerably; so that with the assistance which the said king of Champa lent him, they put many Portuguese and other Christians to death." In fact, by this time Islam had made many converts in Champa via missionaries from Brunei and other Muslim kingdoms in the region. While the king was apparently Hindu, he took pleasure in Muslim education being disseminated in the land.

== Cham involvement in the Cambodian troubles ==
Champa was also affected by the chaotic conditions afflicting Cambodia in 1594–1600. During the Siamese conquest of the Cambodian capital Longvek in 1594, two Malay chiefs called Laksmana and Concona escaped to Champa with many Malays and Cambodians. As they felt slighted by the King of Champa, they started a revolt in the capital while the king was away, pillaging the place. Immediately afterwards they fled back to Cambodia, bringing with them much artillery and numerous prisoners. They won the ear of the new Cambodian King Preah Ram I and emerged as leaders of a sizeable Muslim Malay-Cham community in Cambodia, centered in the Thbaung Khmum province. They also persuaded the king to start a war against Champa which they alleged could easily be conquered. A dignitary called Ukaña Tejo headed the army that duly invaded the Champa Kingdom in 1596.

However, the Cambodian crisis of 1594 eventually led to the intervention of a small troop of Spanish and Portuguese adventurers who managed to surprise and kill King Preah Rama I in May 1596. When he heard about the assassination, Tejo returned to Cambodia and began to meddle in the power play. Tejo and the Malay chief Concona were soon killed by the Iberians who by now dominated the royal Khmer court. However, Laksmana and his Cham associate Po Rat violently opposed the Europeans after a fallout in Phnom Penh in 1599. The Europeans were massacred by the Chams and Malays, and Laksmana and Po Rat proclaimed themselves rulers. They killed the Spanish-backed king Barom Reachea II and started to subjugate large parts of Cambodia. Their Muslim religion did not sit well with the Khmer Buddhists, however. The next ruler Barom Reachea III managed to defeat the Malays and Chams with great losses. Laksmana and part of his troops survived and moved over to Champa. Allegedly, Laksmana planned to remove the Cham usurper king and appropriate at least part of Champa for himself. The struggle caused great havoc in Champa, but ended with the King of Champa eliminating Laksmana and his men in c. 1599–1600. This may have been part of a more complex series of events, since a Vietnamese source mentions Chams unsuccessfully fighting against the southern Vietnamese in 1600.

Po Klong Halau died in 1603 according to the common chronology. He had at least two sons called Po Nit and Po Jai Paran who became kings in turn after him. His tomb is situated in the village Hamu Tanran, south of Phan Rang, though it was badly ruined by the late 19th century.

Preceded by Po At 1553-1579	Champa rulers 1579–1603	Succeeded by Po Nit 1603-1613
