= Po Nit =

King of Champa (d. 1613)

- King of Champa; King of Panduranga

King of Champa
- Reign: 1603–1613
- Predecessor: Po Klaong Halau
- Successor: Po Jai Paran
- Born: ? Champa
- Died: 1613; Băl Canar, Panduranga, Champa (in present-day Phan Rí Cửa, Tuy Phong District, Bình Thuận Province, Vietnam)
- Father: Po Klaong Halau
- Religion: Hinduism

Po Nit (died 1613) was a King of Panduranga in Champa. Chronicles that were written much later say that he reigned in the period 1603-1613 (or, according to some versions, 1591–1601). He was also known as Po Klaong Anak or Po Klaong Gohul. His reign was marked by an unsuccessful war with the Vietnamese Nguyễn lord in 1611, which resulted in a contraction of territory.

== Indigenous sources for the reign ==
The personal details about Cham kings in this era are known from later historical chronicles, such as Mangbalai and Sakkarai dak rai patao. However, we also possess European and Vietnamese accounts from the early 17th century, although they do not mention the name of the king. The chronicles say that he was the son and successor of Po Klaong Halau, the founder of the dynasty. According to the texts, he was an uneducated person who did not know how to read or write. He was not a popular ruler since "the people did not voluntarily obey him".

== European accounts ==
A Catholic Manila-based priest, Gabriel Quiroga de San Antonio, wrote a short second-hand account of Champa that was published in 1604. He characterizes the king (perhaps the former ruler Po Klaong Halau) as a "traitor to the Castilians and Portuguese" and a perfidious sun-worshipper (Hindu). He describes Champa as filled with valuable ebony forests, being rich in gold, silver, and artillery. Also, Islam had lately made inroads in the country, "out of hate for the Castilians". His opinion of the Chams is entirely prejudiced, as he blamed them for being "malicious and heartless" and engaged in pagan rituals where believers threw themselves under the floats carrying their idols. A Dutch account from Cornelis Matelief de Jonge's journey in 1607 says that the Cham ruler was allied to Johor on the Malay Peninsula, and that the Portuguese as a consequence had not traded with Champa for three years. Commerce was firmly in the hand of the Chinese, and there was an abundant supply of rice. According to the Dutch, conditions in Champa were problematic due to the ongoing conflicts with the Vietnamese of Cochinchina. While the king was a "pagan", his brother and heir (presumably Po Jai Paran) was inclined towards Islam.

== War with the Nguyễn ==
Full-scale war with the Nguyễn ruler Nguyễn Hoàng broke out in 1611. By the end of the 16th century, Champa had regained territory from the Vietnamese who were occupied with internal wars, as far north as the Cù Mông Pass, just to the south of Quy Nhon. However, attempts to push further and attack Quảng Nam province provoked a determined response from the Nguyễn who wished to secure Phú Yên as a buffer. Nguyễn Hoàng sent a force to block the incursion and defend and garrison Phú Yên, but did not proceed south of the old boundary from 1471.

Cham tradition says little about this event, although the reign of Po Nit is credited with the establishment of Kinh Cuu, or Cham-Vietnamese mestizos in the Parik (Phan Ri) area. Po Nit died shortly after the defeat, in 1613 (or 1601 in the alternative chronology) and was succeeded by his brother and heir Po Jai Paran. His tomb is found at the grand dune or gahul by Parik.

Preceded by Po Klaong Halau 1679–1603	Champa rulers 1603–1613	Succeeded by Po Jai Paran 1613–1618
