= Sarmat =

Sarmat may refer to:

- RS-28 Sarmat, a Russian missile
- Sarmat, a historical region of Bulga, Ethiopia
- Sarmat (ship), a Russian ship in 1904 and 1905; see Vandal (tanker)
- Sarmato (Emilian: Särmat), a comune in Piacenza, Italy
- Pseudonym of Russian writer Kazimir Barantsevich (1851–1927)

== See also ==
- Sarmatian (disambiguation)
- Samrat (disambiguation)
