= Ramathibodi =

Ramathibodi or Ramathipbodi (Thai: รามาธิบดี, pronounced [rāː.māː.tʰí(p).bɔ̄ː.dīː]; Sanskrit: Rāmadhipati; "Overlord Rāma") was a Thai royal title. All Thai monarchs took Ramathibodi as their formal or ceremonial title, but a few are widely known by it.

It may refer to:

- Ramathibodi I, also known as U Thong
- Ramathibodi II, also known as Chetthathirat
- Order of Rama, known in Thai as Ramathibodi
- Ramathibodi Hospital

== See also ==
- Rama (disambiguation)
- Adipati (disambiguation)
- Rama (Kings of Thailand)
