= Sarmatia (disambiguation) =

Sarmatia or Sarmatian may refer to:

- Sarmatia, the land of the Sarmatians in eastern Europe, ancient Iranian peoples closely related to the Scythians
  - Sarmatia Asiatica and Sarmatia Europea, geographical differentiation of the above
  - Sarmatian language, an Eastern Iranian language
- Sarmatia (moth), a genus of moths in the family Erebidae
- Sarmatian (age), an age in the geologic timescale of Central Europe and Central Asia
- Polish–Lithuanian Commonwealth
- Sarmatism, the lifestyle of the aristocracy of the Polish–Lithuanian Commonwealth
- Sarmatian Review, a peer reviewed academic journal
- Sarmatian craton, in geology the southern segment/region of the East European Craton

== See also ==
- Sarmat (disambiguation)
