= Rajadhi Raja =

Rajadhi Raja (transl. king of kings) may refer to:

- Rajadhiraja, an Indian royal title, also rendered maharajadhiraja ("great king of kings")
  - Rajadhiraja I, Chola Emperor of India from 1044–1052
  - Rajadhiraja II, Chola Emperor
  - Rajadhiraja of Malwa, a king of Malwa
- Rajadhi Raja (1989 film), a 1989 Tamil film
- Rajadhi Raja (1992 film), a 1992 Kannada film
- Rajadhi Raja (2009 film), a 2009 Tamil film
- Rajadhi Raja (2014 film), a 2014 Malayalam film
- Rajadhi Raja (2016 film), a 2016 Telugu film
- Rajadhiraja St. Mary's Jacobite Syrian Cathedral, Piravom or St. Mary's Orthodox Syrian Cathedral, Piravom, church in Kerala, India

== See also ==
- Rajadhi (disambiguation)
- King of Kings (disambiguation)
- Intharacha (disambiguation)
- Borommarachathirat (disambiguation)
- Rajadhi Raja Raja Kulothunga Raja Marthanda Raja Gambeera Kathavaraya Krishna Kamarajan, 1993 Indian film by Balu Anand
