= King of All Kings =

King of All Kings may refer to:

- King of All Kings (Hate Eternal album), 2002
- King of All Kings (Pastor Troy album), 2010

== See also ==
- King of Kings (disambiguation)
- Samrat (disambiguation), Indian title, literally "king of all"
- Chakravarti (disambiguation), title for an emperor in ancient India, literally "universal ruler"
