= MMA Raju =

MMA league based in Estonia

Raju
- Company type: Private
- Industry: Mixed martial arts promotion
- Founded: 2009
- Founder: Ott Tõnissaar
- Headquarters: Tartu, Estonia
- Website: mmaraju.com

RAJU is the highest level of Estonian mixed martial arts competition. There are 2 competitions in a year, each holding matches for professional and amateur fighters.

== Fighter divisions ==
Fighters could participate at MMA Raju in one of the three following divisions: amateur (C-class), semi-professional (B-class) and professional (A-class).

In all three classes, the following actions are considered fouls: headbutts, biting, grabbing hair, inserting fingers into orifices or wounds, attacks to the groin, small joint manipulation, attacks to the back of the head and spine, attacking and grabbing the throat, clawing and pinching, grabbing the collar-bone, direct attacks to joints, 12-to-6 elbow strikes, kicks and knees to the head of a grounded opponent, intentionally throwing the opponent by the head or neck, throwing the opponent out of the cage, spitting at the opponent, grabbing the fence, swearing.

For semi-professionals (B-class) the following additional actions are forbidden: elbow and forearm strikes to the head, kicking a grounded opponent in the head.

For amateurs (C-class) the following additional actions are forbidden: elbow and forearm strikes, knees to the head, striking a grounded opponent to the head, kicking a grounded opponent, kidney strikes, throws with only a head-hold, leglocks that twist the knee, submissions that twist the spine.

Since RAJU 8, there are two separate events held each time – amateur event during the day (C-class) and main event in the evening with professional fights.

== Weight classes ==
Prior to Raju 8, weigh-ins took place on the day of the competition. At Raju 8, weigh-ins for the evening event took place one day before the event.

- Flyweight (-125 lb, -56.7 kg)
- Bantamweight (-135 lb, -61.2 kg)
- Featherweight (-145 lb, -65.8 kg)
- Lightweight (-155 lb, -70.3 kg)
- Welterweight (-170 lb, -77.1 kg)
- Middleweight (-185 lb, -83.9 kg)
- Light Heavyweight (-205 lb, -93.0 kg)
- Heavyweight (-265 lb, -120.2 kg)
- Super Heavyweight (+265 lb, +120.2 kg)

== Events ==
No.	Event	Date	Venue	Location	Gate
1	MMA Raju 1	21 February 2009	University of Tartu Sports Hall	Tartu, Estonia	200
2	MMA Raju 2	6 June 2009	A. Le Coq Sports Hall	Tartu, Estonia	320
3	MMA Raju 3	31 October 2009	Tartu Sport Foundation Sports Hall	Tartu, Estonia	500
4	MMA Raju 4	13 February 2010	Tallinn University of Technology Sports Complex	Tallinn, Estonia	750
5	MMA Raju 5	29 May 2010	Kalev Sports Hall	Tallinn, Estonia	675
6	MMA Raju 6	23 October 2010	A. Le Coq Sports Hall	Tartu, Estonia	1050
7	MMA Raju 7	19 February 2011	Tallinn University of Technology Sports Complex	Tallinn, Estonia	1100
8	MMA Raju 8	22 October 2011	A. Le Coq Sports Hall	Tartu, Estonia	1300
9	MMA Raju 9	14 April 2012	Kalev Sports Hall	Tallinn, Estonia	1500
10	MMA Raju X	13 October 2012	A. Le Coq Sports Hall	Tartu, Estonia	1900
11	SLT Raju 11	20 April 2013	Saku Suurhall	Tallinn, Estonia	2200
12	Olly RAJU 12	19 October 2013	A. Le Coq Sports Hall	Tartu, Estonia	
13	Raju 13	19 April 2014	Saku Suurhall	Tallinn, Estonia	
14	RAJU 14	18 October 2014	A. Le Coq Sports Hall	Tartu, Estonia	
15	MMA RAJU 15	30 March 2024	A. Le Coq Sports Hall	Tartu, Estonia	
16	MMA RAJU 16	21 September 2024	Kalev Sports Hall	Tallinn, Estonia	
17	MMA RAJU 17	22 February 2025	A. Le Coq Sports Hall	Tartu, Estonia	
18	MMA RAJU 18	20 September 2025	Tondiraba Ice Hall	Tallinn, Estonia	

== Social responsibility ==
Before MMA Raju 7, the organizers established a charity program called "Donate blood with Raju fighters". In this program, mixed martial artists themselves and fans of the league donate blood together during one day, which occurs roughly one month before the event. For Raju 7, roughly 40 people donated blood. Before Raju 8, 85 people donated their blood, including Estonian rapper G-Enka. Before Raju X, over 200 people donated blood.
