= Chakravarthy =

Chakravarthy, Chakravarthi, Chakravarti or Chakravarty may refer to:

== Films ==
- Chakravarthy (1977 film), Indian Tamil film
- Chakravarthy (1987 film), Indian Telugu film
- Chakravarthy (1991 film), Indian Malayalam film
- Chakravarthy (1995 film), Indian Tamil film
- Chakravarthy (2017 film), Indian Kannada film

== People ==
- Balli Kalyan Chakravarthy (born 1984), Indian politician
- C. Rajagopalachari (1878–1972), Indian lawyer, Independence activist, politician, writer
- K. Chakravarthy (1936–2002), Telugu film score composer
- Varun Chakravarthy (born 1991), Indian cricketer

== Other ==
- Chakravarti (Sanskrit term), a universal king in Indian and Asian literature

== See also ==
- Chakravarti (disambiguation)
- Chakraborty, an Indian surname
