= Borommarachathirat =

Borommaracha or Borom Racha (Thai: บรมราชา, IPA: [bɔː.rom.má.raː.t͡ɕʰaː / bɔː.rom raː.t͡ɕʰaː]; Pali: Paramarājā; "Supreme King"), or the extended version Borommarachathirat or Borom Rachathirat (Thai: บรมราชาธิราช, IPA: [bɔː.rom.má.raː.t͡ɕʰaː.tʰí.râːt / bɔː.rom raː.t͡ɕʰaː.tʰí.râːt]; Pali: Paramarājādhirāja; "Supreme King of High kings"), was a Thai royal title, and may refer to:

- Borommarachathirat I (died 1388), third king of Ayutthaya Kingdom
- Borommarachathirat II (died 1448), king of Ayutthaya
- Borommarachathirat III (died 1491), king of Ayutthaya from 1488 to 1491
- Borommarachathirat IV (died 1533), short-reigning king of Ayutthaya from 1529 to 1533
- Taksin (1734–1782), known in some documents as Borommarachathirat IV

== See also ==
- Barom Reachea (disambiguation), Khmer equivalent title
- Param (disambiguation)
- Rajadhi Raja (disambiguation)
