= Kaev Hua I =

Preah Keo Fa I ព្រះកែវហ្វាទី១

King of Cambodia
- Reign: 1600 – 1602
- Coronation: 1600
- Predecessor: Borom Reamea III
- Successor: Borom Reachea IV
- Born: Longvek, Cambodia
- Died: 1602; Koh Slaket Kandal province
- Issue: None
Names
- Phreahbat Samdach Pheah Keo Fa Reameathipadei
- House: List of monarchs of Cambodia
- Father: Borom Reachea II
- Religion: Not Believe Religions

Preah Keo Fa I or Ponhea Nhoum (Khmer: ព្រះកែវហ្វាទី១), ឬ (Khmer: ពញ្ញាញោម) (Siam-call: Kaev Hua I) was the Cambodian king ruled from 1600 to 1602. After the official coronation ceremony in capital city of Srei Santhor in 2144 BE, 1600 AD, Maha Sakarach 1523, his full name was called "Phreahbat Samdach Pheah Keo Fa Reameathipadei" Ponhea Nhoum was the third son of king Satha I, He succeeded was the king, After assassinated "Borom Reamea III", in an attempt to seize the throne.

== National Social Crisis ==
During the time when King Keo Fa I became the King of Cambodia, he did not care about the affairs of the kingdom and the practice of religion. He devoted himself to gambling and enjoyed traveling and hunting. As a result, some officials conspired to exploit each other, use their power as officials to oppress the people, and commit systematic corruption, The King's indifference to the affairs of the kingdom caused the entire nation to fall into anarchy and caused the country to experience serious social unrest. The people, unable to bear the oppression of the powerful officials, began to gather in their regions and create rebellions throughout the country.

== Military coup d'état ==
During the year that King Keo Fa I had been on the throne, Cambodia had fallen into a serious social crisis. "Pheakeak Vottey" The Queen Mother, She was the first wife of King Satha I, She had a son named "Ponhea Ton" and was the sister-in-law of Preah Srei Soriyoapor, issued a royal decree, which means a statement from the Supreme Council of the Royal Throne, requesting the Siamese king of Ayutthaya, Preah Chau Nores, to return Srei Soriyoapor, whom the Siamese king had captured as a hostage during the conquest of Longvek city, to rule as king of Cambodia. Cambodia Queen mother promise to the Siamese King to promote Buddhism, the Supreme Council accepted and practiced the Theravada Buddhism of the King of Siam. The Siamese king, Preah Chau Nores, agreed to the request, giving 5,000 troops to Srei Soriyoapor, but he still kept some of the Cambodian royal family members to threaten the Cambodian king to not have the opportunity to raise an army to retake territory from Siam. The King of Siam kept two sons of Srei Soriyoapor, The first son named Chey Chestha and the second son named Uotey Reachea knows as (Samdech Preah Outey). Srei Soriyoapor, He was the uncle of King Keo Fa I, He began to gather troops and establish his new fortress on Koh Slaket, Kandal Province, in 1601 AD, in preparation for a military coup to depose King Keo Fa I from the throne. The people were dissatisfied with the king's rule, which lacked the ten virtues, which are the ten virtues for the king to follow in leading the state. Therefore, many people and rebel groups decided to submit Srei Soriyoapor to support him as king. The military coup began Srei Soriyoapor sent Techo Meas to raise an army from Samrong Tong (present-day Kampong Speu) of 26,000 troops to attack the army of King Keo Fa I at the Battle of Chaktomuk, which consisted of 15,000 troops led by a general named Ponhea Keo, The battle broke out. Techo Meas sent six armies group to attack the army of King Keo Fa, the war tactic like buffalo horn. In the end, King Keo Fa's army, led by Ponhea Keo, was completely destroyed at Chaktomuk, while the royal guard at Srey Santhor, under the control of the Queen Mother, arrested King Keo Fa I and took him to Srei Soriyoapor in Slaket fortress for trial. In the end, King Keo Fa I was sentenced to death by Srei Soriyoapor for involvement in the assassination of the former king, Ponhea On, the youngest son of King Borom Reachea II, in 1602 AD.

Kaev Hua I Longvek Dynasty Born: 1579 Died: 1602
Regnal titles
Preceded by Borom Reamea III	King of Cambodia; 1600–1602	Succeeded by Borom Reachea IV
