= A. Le Coq Sports Hall =

Sport venue in Tartu, Estonia

- A Le Coq Sport spordimaja
- Interactive map of A. Le Coq Sports Hall
- Address: Ihaste tee 7, 51011 Tartu, Estonia
- Location: Tartu, Estonia
- Coordinates: 58°22′17″N 26°45′08″E

Construction
- Opened: 2006

Website
- tartusport.ee

A. Le Coq Sports Hall (Estonian: A Le Coq Sport spordimaja) is a sports hall in Tartu, Estonia. The hall is named after its supporter: A. Le Coq.

The hall was opened in 2006. The hall is designed by Eero Palm. The hall is built by AS Randväli & Karema.

The hall has seats for 2000 people.
