= ICGS Vishwast =

Vishwast-class offshore patrol vessel

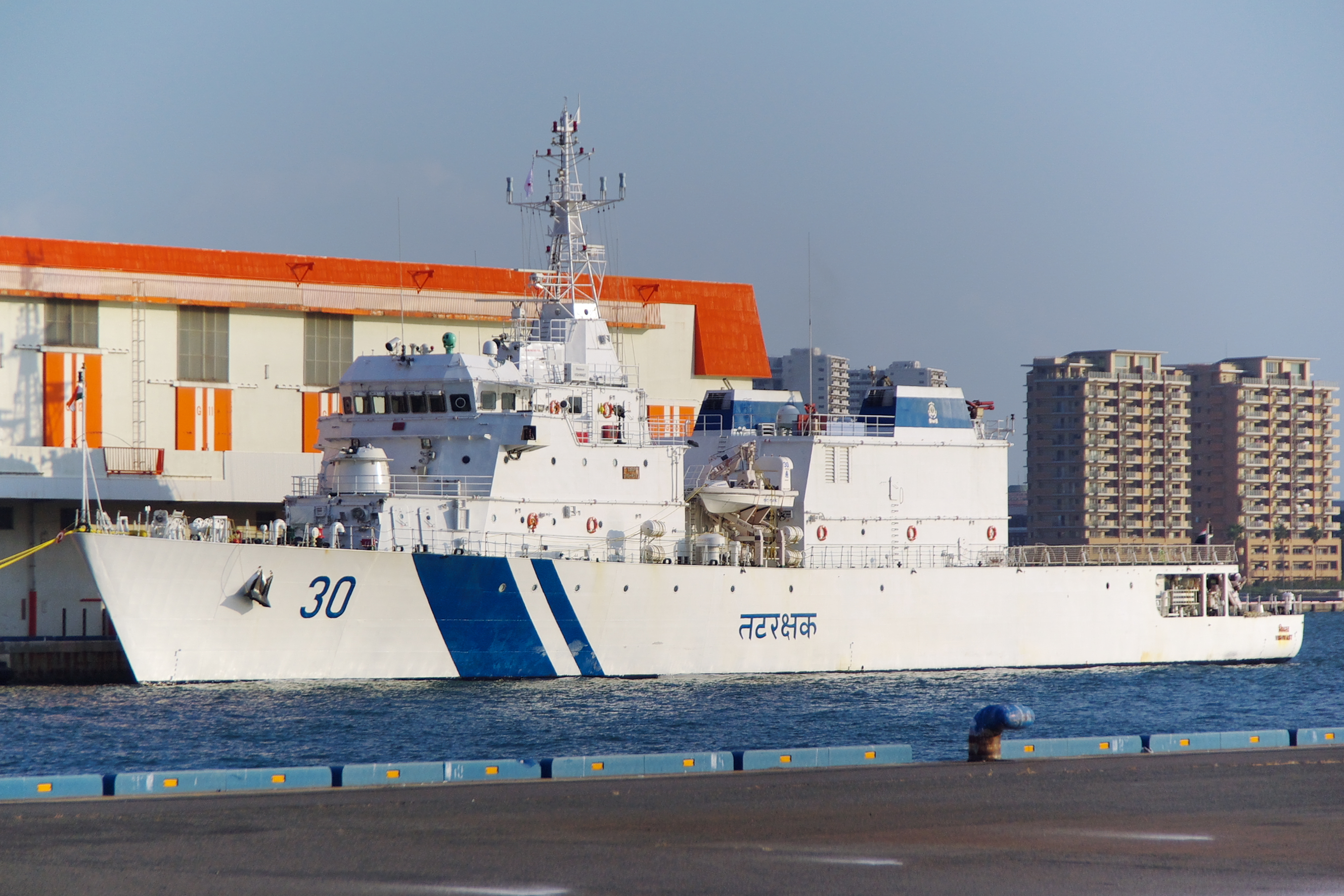
- Photograph of the Indian Coast Guard's offshore patrol vessel ICGS Vishwast at the Shinko Pier No. 2, Port of Kobe, Japan.

History

India
- Name: ICGS Vishwast
- Owner: Indian Coast Guard
- Builder: Goa Shipyard Limited
- Commissioned: March 2010
- Status: in active service

Class overview
- Name: Vishwast class
- Builders: Goa Shipyard Limited
- Operators: Indian Coast Guard
- Preceded by: Sankalp class
- Succeeded by: Samarth class
- Planned: 3
- Completed: 3
- Active: 3

General characteristics
- Type: Offshore patrol vessel
- Displacement: 1,840 tons
- Length: 94 metres (308 ft)
- Beam: 12.2 m (40 ft 0 in)
- Draught: 4.5 m (14 ft 9 in) (propeller)
- Depth: 3.6 m (11 ft 10 in)
- Installed power: 18,000 kilowatts (24,000 hp)
- Speed: 26 kn (48 km/h)
- Range: 4,500 nmi (8,300 km)
- Complement: 10 officers and 98 sailors
- Armament: 30 mm CRN naval gun with SOP; 2 x 12.7 mm HMG.
- Aircraft carried: 1 x HAL Dhruv

ICGS Vishwast (OPV-30) (Literally means Reliable) is one of the three Vishwast-class offshore patrol vessels (OPV) of the Indian Coast Guard.

== History ==
The vessel was built in India by Goa Shipyard Ltd. (GSL) and was commissioned in March 2010 in the Indian Coast Guard by then defence minister A K Antony. ICGS Vishwast is 90 metres (295 ft 3 in) in length and displaces 2,400 tons. In 2015, the ship was deployed to Malaysia and Myanmar. In 2016, the ship was deployed to visit Bangladesh, Myanmar and Thailand - where it was involved in an exercise with the navies of the respective countries. Vishwast is capable of firefighting, search and patrol, pollution control (due to oil spillage) and maritime surveillance.

On 28th September 2026, the crew of ICGS Vishwast and an ICG Dornier patrol aircraft rescued 23 crew members of a Belize-flagged Palm oil tanker MT Seagull 9, which had experienced an engine and ballast tank failure 37 nautical miles south of Paradip.
