= Samrat (name) =

Samrat or Samrāṭ may refer to the following people:

== Given name ==
- Samrat Chakrabarti (born 1975), British-American film actor and musician
- Samrat Moze, Indian politician
- Samrat Mukerji, Indian film actor
- Samrat Saheba (born 1981), Indian cricketer
- Samrat Singha (born 1989), Indian first-class cricketer
- Samrat Upadhyay, Nepalese writer

== Surname ==
- Jagannatha Samrat (1652–1744), Indian astronomer and mathematician
- Pulkit Samrat, Indian film actor and model
- Pappu Samrat, Pakistani choreographer
