= Raju Peddada =

Industrial and graphic designer based in the Chicago metropolitan area

Raju Peddada is an industrial and graphic designer and the founder of an eponymous brand, based in the Chicago metropolitan area. The Chicago Tribune has called him a "Passionate and dynamic designer". CLEAR magazine has referred to him as "The Taste-Maker."

Peddada manufactures his limited-edition works of silver accessories in the hills of Lake Como, Italy, producing only 38 hand-made units per design, for the whole of the European and North American markets. His Rugs are entirely hand-woven in Nepal and India to his exacting designs, material specifications, and manufacturing standards. "Peddada designs represent a quantum shift in contemporary decorative arts." Peddada designs are featured in the world's leading consumer culture-design-fashion publications, and his designs have been exhibited at the SOFA show, through the Function Art Gallery, in Chicago, and at MACEF in Milan. His most notable product introduction was the critically acclaimed "Tex-Mix Collection," featuring his two-year-old son's art, as the basis for the rug collection. Dwell magazine hailed it as a "Brilliant collection.”

Peddada has been a freelance journalist for eight years, with over a hundred articles on various subjects in every format – as essays, reviews, interviews, critiques, commentary, and disquisitions. He also writes a column called "Monuments of Civilization: Analysis of Classics," which has been regularly published by Swans, a literary magazine. Peddada's work also has appeared in Book-Forum and The New York Times Week-in-Review. Camera Obscura has published three books authored by him: The Curative Literature of Art Shay; The People of the American Civil War; and The Photography of Satya Peddada.

Raju Peddada was born in the mid 1950s, in a remote town of West Godavari district, Andhra Pradesh, India. He grew up in New Delhi, and then migrated to the west in 1983, becoming a naturalized American in the late eighties. He attended the University of Delhi for his bachelor's degree in commerce, and dropped out from the MBA program at Northwestern and the MFA program at the School of the Art Institute of Chicago.
