= Po Rome =

- King of Champa; King of Panduranga
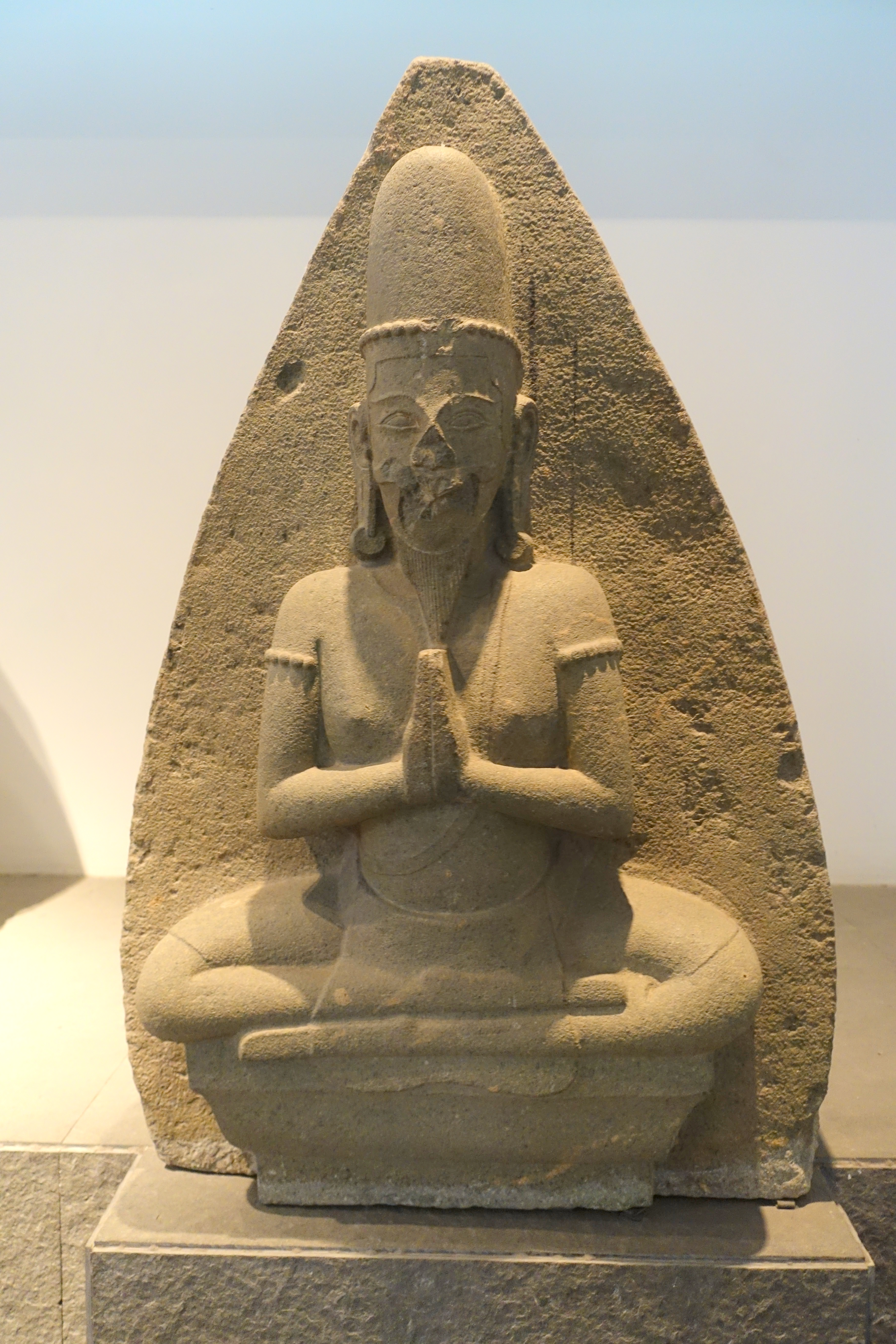
- Po Rome statue at Museum of Vietnamese History - Ho Chi Minh City

King of Champa
- Reign: 1627–1651
- Predecessor: Po Klaong Mah Nai
- Successor: Po Nraup
- Born: Unknown; Champa
- Died: 1651; Phú Yên
- Spouse: Bia Than Cih; Bia Than Can; Bia Ut
- Issue: Po Mul
Names
- Nik Mustafa Bin Wan Abul Muzaffar Waliyullah
Regnal name
- Sultan Abdul Hamid Shah Bin Syarif Wan Abu Muzaffar Bin Syarif Wan Abdullah Umdatuddin

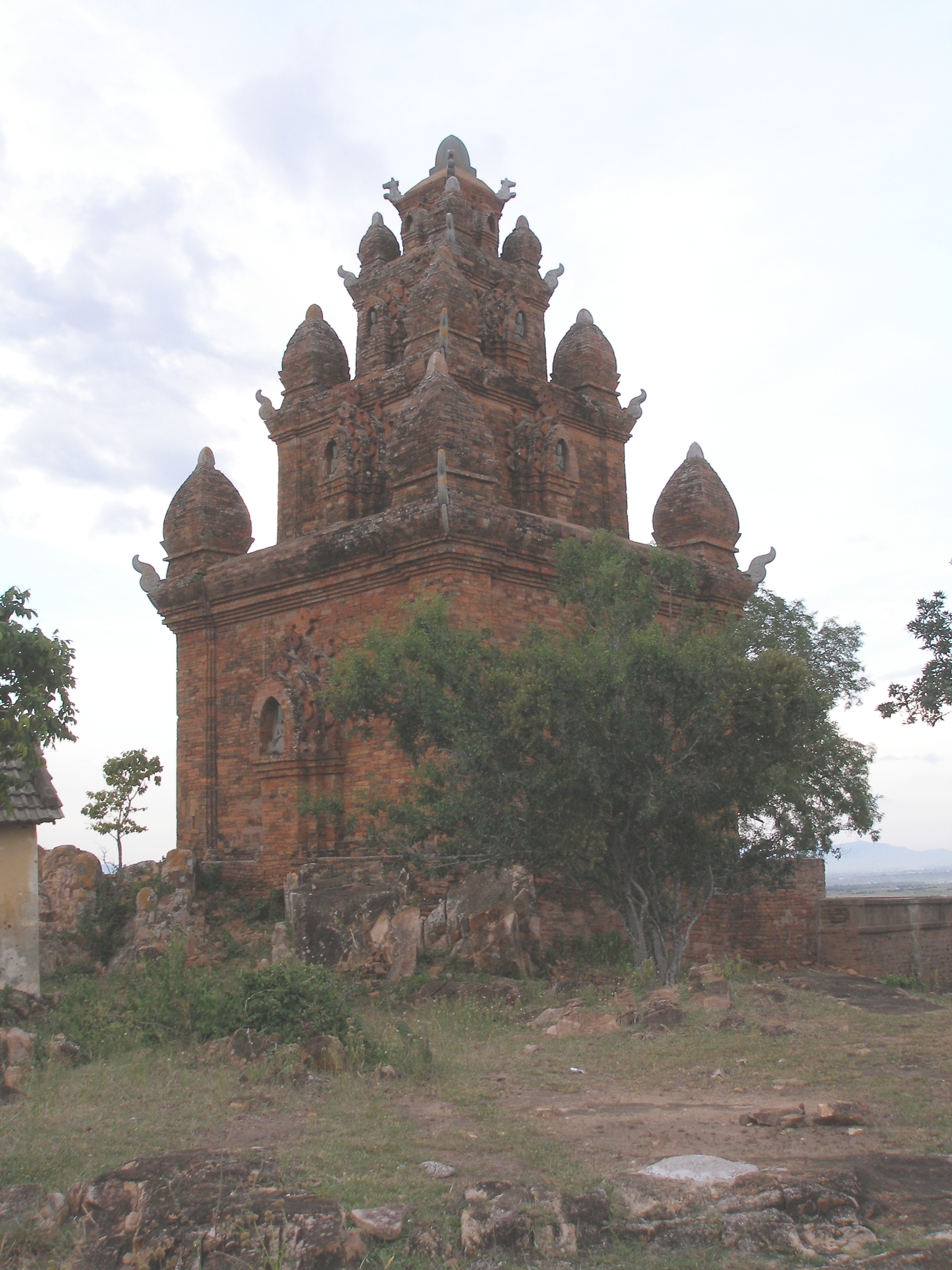
Po Rome Temple

Po Rome (?–1651), also spelled Po Romê, Po Romé or Po Ramo, with the Muslim name Nik Mustafa Bin Wan Abul Muzaffar Waliyullah (Jawi: نئ مصطفى بن وان ابول موزففر والييولله), regnal name Sultan Abdul Hamid Shah (Jawi: سلطان عبدالحميد شه), was the king of Panduranga Champa, reigning from 1627 to 1651.

== Reign ==
Po Rome was a Churu chief, originally from present-day Đơn Dương District, Lâm Đồng Province. According to local legends, his born name was Ja Kathaot (Cham: ꨎ ꨆꨔꨯꨱꩅ). Malay historical tradition speaks of a Cham prince called Nik Mustafa who, prior to his ascent to the throne, stayed in Kelantan for several years. This prince has been identified as Po Rome. He succeeded the throne in 1627. Kelantan tradition says that Nik Mustafa, upon coming to the Champa throne, assumed the royal title Sultan Abdul Hamid Shah Bin Syarif Wan Abu Muzaffar Bin Syarif Wan Abdullah Umdatuddin (Jawi: سلطان عبدالحميد شاه بن شريف وان ابو موزففر بن شريف وان عبدالله اومداتو الدين). Whether Po Rome was officially a Muslim is, however, debated. Dutch visitors noted in 1644 that the king expressed disapproval of the usurpation of power in Cambodia by a Muslim prince. At any rate, he took a conciliatory position as he subdued both Hindu and Muslim factions, forcing peace between the Cham communities.

King Po Rome built dams and canals to nurture agriculture in the Phan Rang basin. During his reign, Champa traded with Siam, Cambodia, Vietnam, Japan, the Malay world, and even the Western countries including France and Portugal. In 1638 he paid a visit to the King of Cambodia, Ang Tong Reachea who was his ally and related to him by blood. Champa also raided the areas occupied by Nguyễn lord. The Vietnamese Phú Yên governor Văn Phong (文封) revolted against the Nguyễn lord in 1629, taking advantage of an attack by the Trịnh lord of Tonkin, and "used the Chiêm Thành [Champa] army to be disloyal". The enterprise was however put down by general Nguyễn Hữu Vinh (阮有榮). At the occasion, the Vietnamese captured Cham land to the north of the Phan Rang River. Two years later, peaceful relations were restored as Po Rome married Nguyễn Phúc Ngọc Khoa (阮福玉誇), daughter of the Vietnamese lord Nguyễn Phúc Nguyên.

In 1651, Po Rome died a violent death in Phú Yên during an outbreak of hostilities between Chams and Việt. According to a Dutch report from January 1652, "the Quinamese [Southern Vietnamese] have subjugated Champa through the arms, beheaded the king, and keep the Dairo [upper priest] prisoner". His younger brother Po Nraup succeeded to the throne.

The current Sakawi Cham standard with its origins based on the Saka Raja standard of the Cham calendar was also likely instituted during the reign of Po Rome.

The Cham people were sad to hear of his death. According to tradition they built a temple for him, the Po Rome Temple located at Ninh Phước district, Ninh Thuận province. However, some scholars believe that the Po Rome Temple may have been constructed prior to the 17th century. The temple is anyway a site for veneration of Po Rome, who is one of the principal deified figures in traditional Cham rites.

== The legend of Po Rome ==
Later tradition reformulated the story of Po Rome to provide an explanation to the expansion of the Vietnamese. It asserts that Po Rome's mother was made pregnant without intercourse with a man. She raised the future king in the village Razoh, where the other children insulted him for being a bastard. Unable to bear this, he moved with his mother to Hamu Barau, and then to Boh Matuh in the land of Panduranga, where he tended the king's buffaloes. His destiny was indicated through a meeting with a dragon when he once hunted birds in a forest. When he had grown up to be a young man, his lord Po Klaong Mah Nai wished to abdicate his throne. One day, the royal astrologist heard a voice from the kitchen, which was Po Rome chasing away dogs from the premises. He proclaimed: "This is the voice of the future King of Champa". The young man was summoned and the king proclaimed him his successor, giving him his daughter Bia Than Cih in marriage. As he did not have any children with her, he took a Rhade woman, Bia Than Can, as his second wife. She gave birth to the daughter Po Mul whom he later married off to prince Phik Cak (later king under the name Po Saktiraydapaghoh).

Phik Cak had good relations with the Nguyễn lord in the north, and revealed to him the weaker sides of Po Rome's character. The Nguyễn lord then sent his beautiful daughter Bia Ut (Nguyễn Phúc Ngọc Khoa) to Champa, disguised as a vendor. Po Rome came to hear rumours about her extraordinary beauty and called for her. Completely enamoured, he made Bia Ut his consort. After three months in the palace, she pretended to fall seriously ill. The king, worried, asked his diviners, who in fact had been instructed by the traitor Phik Cak. They told Po Rome that the only remedy for the illness was to fell the sacred krek (trunk of ironwood) that protected Champa. The king, deaf to the pleas by his astrologers that it would ruin his kingdom, took a hatchet and felled the krek, which gave off a blood-like substance.

Immediately afterwards, the Vietnamese attacked in full force. At first, Po Rome was successful in beating off the invaders and made a great slaughter among them. However, he refused to listen to his astrologers' advice that it was necessary to expel the Vietnamese princess Bia Ut. The protective deities of the realm, discontent with Po Rome, eventually abandoned the kingdom, and a last Vietnamese attack was successful. The victors put Po Rome in an iron cage and brought him towards Hue. However, his daughter Po Mul boded up troops and pursued the Vietnamese army, demanding to get her father back. The Vietnamese killed Po Rome and handed over the corpse which was then duly cremated. Po Rome's Rhade wife threw herself on the funeral pyre. The Vietnamese princess, on the other hand, was killed on the orders of Po Mul and the grandees. Po Mul's husband Phik Cak took over the throne of Champa some years later, as a tributary to the Nguyễn.

The account raises a historiographical problem about the identity of the defeated king of Champa. Cham chronicles date Po Rome's demise in 1651, which is supported by the contemporary Dutch sources, but Vietnamese chronicles date the invasion and the defeat of king "Bà Thấm" in 1653. A contemporary account by the Catholic missionary Tissanier confirms the detail about a Cham king being captured and put in an iron cage, though he does not give the exact date. In the usual interpretation, the defeated king mentioned in Vietnamese sources was actually the next king Po Nraup who is said to have died in 1653. In that case there were repeated Vietnamese invasions.

== Family ==
King Po Rome had one queen consort and two noble consorts:

- Queen Bia Than Cih (also known as Bia Sucih), daughter of King Po Klaong Mah Nai (also known as Po Mah Taha).
- Noble consort Bia Than Can, born name H Drah Jan Kpă, daughter of a Rhade or Kaho chief.
- Noble consort Bia Ut ("Northern Queen"), born name Nguyễn Phúc Ngọc Khoa, daughter of Vietnamese lord Nguyễn Phúc Nguyên(also known as Chúa Sãi).

Through his daughter Po Mul, born from Bia Than Can, he was the ancestor of most of the later Cham kings.

Preceded by Po Klaong Mah Nai 1622–1627	Champa rulers 1627–1651	Succeeded by Po Nraup 1651–1653
