= Halls of the High King =

Dungeons & Dragons adventure module

- Code: FA1
- Rules required: Advanced D&D
- Character levels: 6 - 10
- Campaign setting: Forgotten Realms
- Authors: Ed Greenwood
- First published: 1990

Linked modules
- FA1 FA2

Halls of the High King (ISBN 0-88038-881-1) is an adventure module for the fictional Forgotten Realms campaign setting for the second edition of the Advanced Dungeons & Dragons fantasy role-playing game.

== Contents ==
The 64-page booklet is wrapped in a removable gatefold cover. The book includes a one-page introduction by Ed Greenwood, where he explains that this adventure module takes place in the Moonshae Isles, which are ruled by Tristan Kendrick, High King of the Ffolk, and takes place after the Time of Troubles and the death of the god Bane. The adventure, on pages 3–36, is divided into five chapters:

- Chapter 1: The Adventure Begins begins at any port city of the Sword Coast, such as Waterdeep or Baldur's Gate. A retired caravan master named Panthras hires the player characters (or PCs) to deliver a shipment of swords to the Cantrev of Aithe in Callidyrr, a kingdom on the Moonshae Isles, on behalf of High King Tristan Kendrick; a powerful wizard named Flamsterd will help in recruiting the PCs if needed. They set sail aboard the wooden merchant ship The Mermaid Sword, which is soon attacked by The Ghost Ship, a pirate ship whose crew is invisible. A member of the Risen Cult of Bane posing as a passenger sends undead called lacedons to attack so that he may steal the cargo.
- Chapter 2: "Danger in Aithe" begins as the PCs arrive in the Moonshaes, in the port town of Aithelar. There, they are ambushed by archers and thugs hired by the Cult, before arriving at Aithe Keep to receive an audience with the town's Lord Cauldyth. He tells the PCs about the Cult and their devotion to the god Bane and that they can be found in the nearby Dernall Forest, usually called the Wild Wood. The PCs find Cult priests and their undead servants in the Dark Grove in the forest.
- Chapter 3: Against the Dark Druid begins with the PCs traveling to the small village of Dultann, where they learn that the Cult is using the ruins of Darkhorn Castle as a base. The PCs encounter a number of undead and Cult members while exploring Castle Darkhorn, but are attacked by the Cult as they exit, and assisted by Harpers after the battle. The PCs learn that the Cult plans to make the Moonshaes into the personal realm of Bane, and are striking at Caer Callidyrr, the High King's castle. The PCs are sent through a mystical teleportation gate to defend the castle and save the king.
- Chapter 4: The Halls of the High King begins as the PCs arrive, and the Cult immediately ambushes them. As soon as the PCs arrive in the throne room, 15 cultists have already infiltrated and begin their attack. The High King Tristan Kendrick and his bards defend themselves, as the Cult's polymorphed orcs and animated suits of armor called battle horrors join the fight. The Cult employs a man-sized disembodied floating black hand that acts as a teleporting gate when touched, sending them to the House of the Black Hand temple.
- Chapter 5: The House of the Black Hand begins as the PCs use the black hand themselves to arrive in the Cult's temple. Exploring the House of the Black Hand leads the PCs into a number of battles with Cult members, eventually culminating in the destruction of their unholy altar.

The remainder of the book consists of several appendices:

- Appendix 1: Harping by Firelight (page 37) details a local custom in the Moonshaes of how anyone setting a campfire in the wilderness is duty-bound to share their campsite with any approaching traveler.
- Appendix 2: The Risen Cult of Bane (pages 38–40) details the goals of the Risen Cult of Bane and its abilities, and described members the PCs are likely to encounter during the adventure. This section also gives statistics and details on the Son of Bane, the demigod Xvim.
- Appendix 3: Monsters of the Moonshaes (pages 41–47) details monsters the bonebat, the helmed horror, the nishruu, the nyth, the peltast, the shee, and the weredragon.
- Appendix 4: New Magic Items (pages 48–50) details new magic items that the PCs may discover, or that will be used by the Cult.
- Appendix 5: New Spells (pages 51–54) likewise details new spells that will be used by the Cult or that other characters are likely to know.
- Appendix 6: Campaign Adventuring in the Moonshaes (pages 55–56) presents some ideas for long-term adventuring in the Moonshaes, pointing at FR2 Moonshae as a useful source of adventure ideas as well and an essential resource for the setting.
- Appendix 7: Sacred Groves & Moonwells (pages 57–61) details the properties and powers related to druidic groves, wooded gathering places dedicated to the Goddess, Chauntea.
- Appendix 8: Current Moonshae Rumors (pages 62–64) gives a number of side-adventure ideas that can be used at any time during the adventure. One of these rumors included an all-too-true tale of how the necromancer Velsharoon was seeking demigodhood using the blood of adventurers.

This module also includes a fold-out color poster map of several locales encountered in the module, including the House of the Black Hand, The Mermaid Sword, a partial map of Caer Callidyrr, and portions of Darkhorn Castle. The inside front cover contains a map of Cantrev Aithe and its vicinity, while the inside back cover contains a map of the town of Aithelar. The inside gatefold cover contains a combined monster statistics table while the outside gatefold cover presents a color map of the Moonshae Isles.

== Publication history ==
Halls of the High King, with product code TSR 9301, was written by Ed Greenwood, with cover art by Jeff Easley and interior art by Tim Bradstreet and Rick Harris and published by TSR in 1990.
