= Sankalp-class patrol vessel =

Series of two offshore patrol vessels

Sankalp-class offshore patrol vessel
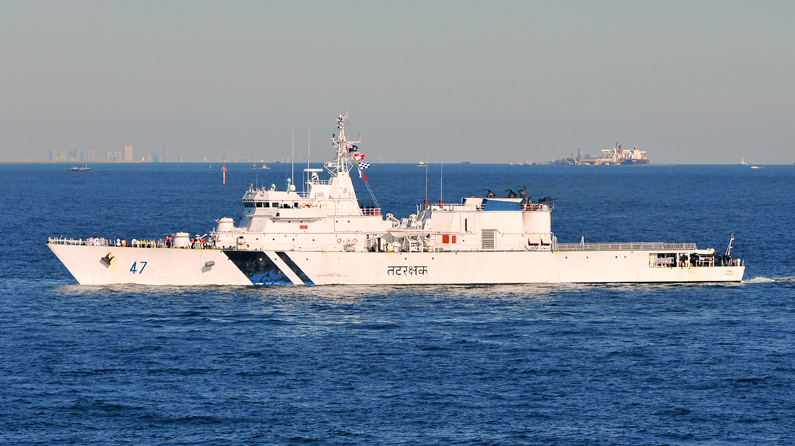
- ICGS Samrat underway

Class overview
- Builders: Goa Shipyard Limited
- Operators: Indian Coast Guard
- Preceded by: Samar class
- Succeeded by: Vishwast class
- Subclasses: Samarth class; Saryu class
- Built: 2004–2009
- In commission: 2008–present
- Planned: 2
- Completed: 2
- Active: 2

General characteristics
- Type: Offshore patrol vessel
- Displacement: 2,230 short tons (2,020 t)
- Length: 105 m (344 ft)
- Beam: 12.9 m (42 ft)
- Draught: 3.6 m (12 ft)
- Propulsion: 2 × SEMT Pielstick 20 PA6B STC diesel engines (20,900 PS; 15,400 kW)
- Speed: 23.5 kn (43.5 km/h)
- Range: 6,500 nmi (12,000 km) at 12 kn (22 km/h)
- Boats & landing craft carried: 5 high speed boats
- Complement: 128 including 15 officers
- Sensors & processing systems: Raytheon surface search radar
- Armament: 2 × 30 mm CRN 91 naval gun; 2 × 12.7 mm machine guns
- Aircraft carried: HAL Dhruv or HAL Chetak

Sankalp-class offshore patrol vessels are a series of two offshore patrol vessels designed and built by Goa Shipyard Limited for the Indian Coast Guard. The vessels, also classified as Advanced Offshore Patrol Vessels, are the largest vessels constructed by Goa Shipyard Limited. Samarth class and Saryu class were derived from this class of offshore patrol vessels.

== History ==
In March 2004, the Indian Coast Guard placed an order for a single Advanced Offshore Patrol Vessel at a cost of ₹228.14 crore (equivalent to ₹808 crore or US$84 million in 2023). In August 2005, a repeat order was placed at the same cost for a similar vessel under options clause of the original contract.

== Description ==
Sankalp-class vessels have an overall length of 105 metres, a 12.9 metre beam and a draught of 3.6 metres. They are powered by two SEMT Pielstick 20 PA6B STC diesel engines rated at a combined 20,900 PS or 15,400 kW, each driving a Wärtsilä WCP 5C10 controllable-pitch propeller. They have a top speed of 24 knots and a range of 6,500 nautical miles at 12 knots. Sankalp class is armed with two 30 mm CRN-91 naval guns controlled by a fire control system and two 12.7 mm "Prahari" machine guns. They are equipped with external firefighting systems, an integrated bridge system and an integrated machinery control system. Sankalp-class ships can carry five high-speed boats capable of search and rescue, interception and pollution control missions. The vessels of this class have been classified by both Indian Register of Shipping and American Bureau of Shipping.

== Operational history ==
In August 2011, ICGS Sankalp participated in a mission to control an oil spill off the coast of Mumbai. In September 2012, Sankalp was tasked to fight a fire onboard MV Amsterdam Bridge. Sankalp has undertaken goodwill visits to Malaysia, Australia, Indonesia, Qatar and Oman.

In December 2013, a CRN-91 naval gun on ICGS Samrat was accidentally triggered as it was being repaired, partly damaging the Western Naval Command headquarters building in Mumbai. In June 2015, ICGS Samrat participated in a disaster relief mission to rescue 20 crew members of MV Jindal Kamakshi. In December 2017, ICGS Samrat rescued 72 fishermen in distress off the coast of Kerala.

== Ships of the class ==
Name	Pennant	Builder	Laid Down	Launched	Commissioned	Homeport	Status
ICGS Sankalp	46	Goa Shipyard Limited	17 July 2004	28 April 2006	20 May 2008	Mumbai	Active
ICGS Samrat	47	Goa Shipyard Limited	May 2006	2 July 2007	22 January 2009	Mumbai	Active
