= A. V. S. Raju =

Indian businessman (1937–2026)

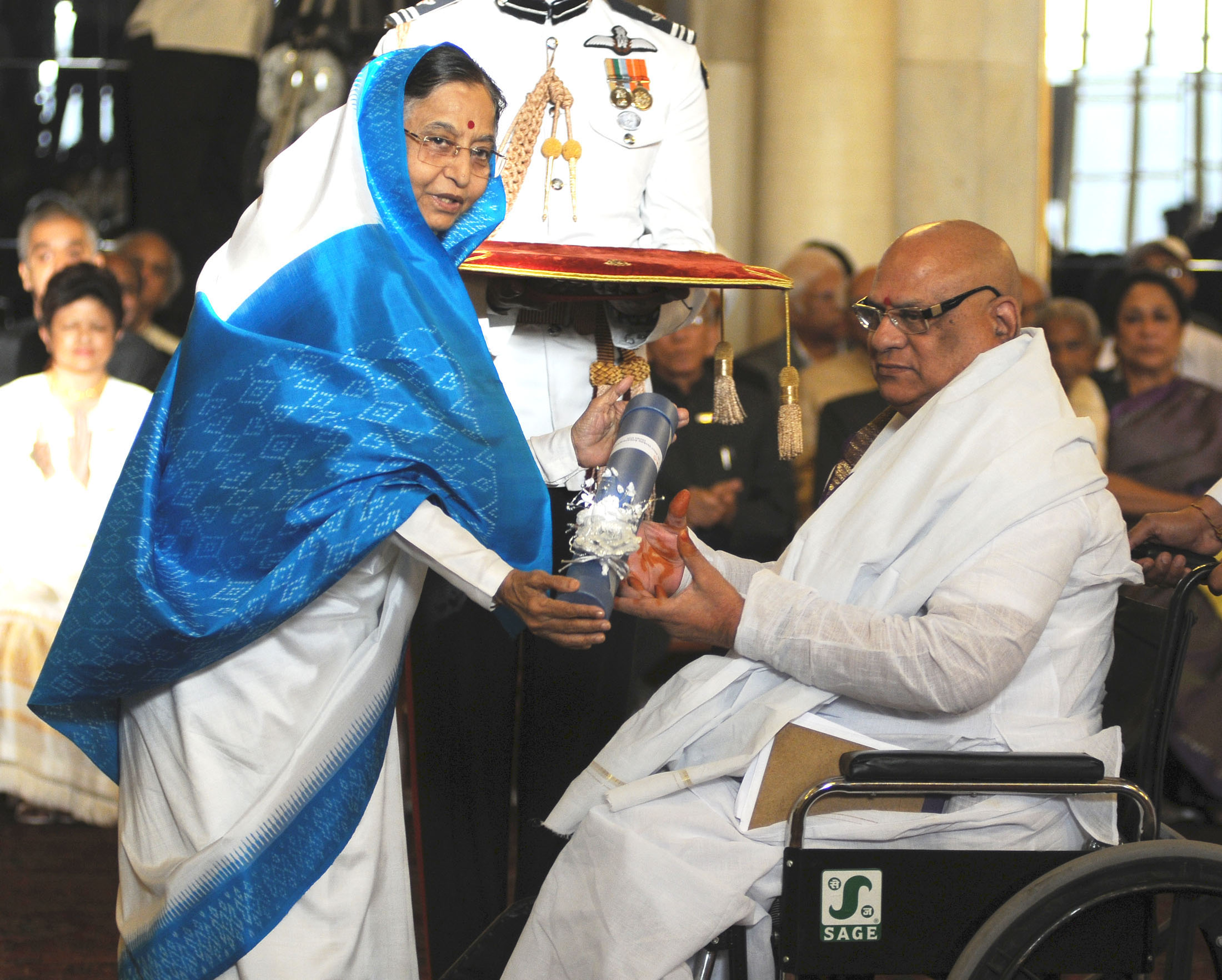
- President Pratibha Patil presenting the Padma Shri award to Raju in 2010
- Born: Alluri Venkata Satyanarayana Raju; 18 April 1937
- Died: 13 October 2026 (aged 89)
- Occupations: Industrialist; writer
- Awards: Padma Shri

Alluri Venkata Sathyanarayana Raju (18 April 1937 – 13 October 2026) was an Indian businessman who worked in the construction industry. He was the founder chairman of Nagarjuna Construction Company Ltd.

== Life and career ==
Alluri Venkata Sathyanarayana Raju was born on 18 April 1937. For the last 45 years of his career, he contributed in promoting many industries around Hyderabad and various parts of Andhra Pradesh while spreading the construction activity in the country. Raju died on 13 October 2026, at the age of 89.

== Social service and other achievements ==
- Awarded "Life Time Achievement award" instituted by the Builders' Association of India. The Union Minister for Overseas Indian Affairs, Vayalar Ravi, presented the award to AVS Raju at a function held in Kochi in 2006.
- Awarded Padma Shri by the Government of India in 2010 in the field of Trade and Industry.
