= ICGS Samrat =

Indian coast guard vessel

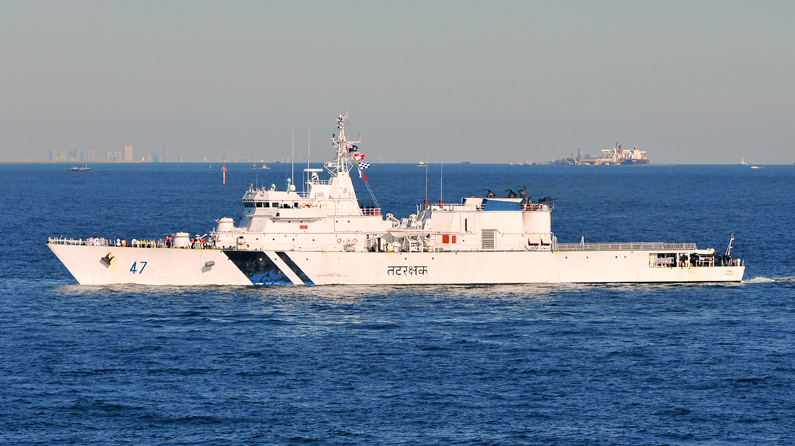
- ICGS Samrat during a joint exercise of Indian and Japanese Coast Guard

History

India
- Name: ICGS Samrat
- Namesake: 'Emperor'
- Owner: Indian Coast Guard
- Builder: Goa Shipyard Limited
- Commissioned: 21 January 2009
- Status: in active service

General characteristics
- Class & type: Sankalp-class offshore patrol vessel
- Displacement: 2,230 short tons (2,020 t)
- Length: 105 m (344 ft)
- Beam: 12.9 m (42 ft)
- Draught: 3.6 m (12 ft)
- Propulsion: 2 × SEMT Pielstick 20 PA6B STC diesel engines (20,900 PS, 15,400 kW)
- Speed: 23.5 kn (43.5 km/h)
- Range: 6,500 nmi (12,000 km) at 12 kn (22 km/h)
- Complement: 128 including 15 officers
- Sensors & processing systems: Raytheon surface search radar
- Armament: 2 × 30 mm CRN-91 naval gun; 2 × 12.7 mm machine guns
- Aircraft carried: HAL Dhruv or HAL Chetak

ICGS Samrat (CG47) is an Indian Coast Guard Advanced Off Shore Patrol Vessel (OPV), second ship of Sankalp class which has been indigenously designed and built by Goa Shipyard Limited. The vessel was commissioned to coast guard service on 21 January 2009 by Former Defence Minister A. K. Antony. Samrat is based in Goa and will be extensively used for Exclusive Economic Zone and other duties as it is set to be exploited extensively on the Western Seaboard.

== Service history ==
Samrat has made several visits to various countries as part of its bilateral efforts to promote goodwill, which are aimed at enhancing cooperation with Maritime Law Enforcement Agencies. On 2 December 2012, Samrat led by Deputy Inspector-General Mukesh Purohit, of the Indian Coast Guard, with 22 officers and 115 sailors on board, anchored at Ho Chi Minh City port, began a 5-day friendly visit to Vietnam. A reception ceremony was held at the port with the participation of representatives from the Ho Chi Minh City People's Committee, Vietnam Marine Police Department, the External Relations Department under the Ministry of National Defence, the High Command of Military Zone 7 and the Indian Ambassador to Vietnam.

On 21 October 2015, as part of goodwill visit to the South East Asian region, in the first-leg of the overseas deployment, ICGS Samrat made a port-call at the Port of Macassar, Indonesia. The visit was aimed at enhancing cooperation with the Maritime Law Enforcement Agencies of Indonesia, including BAKAMLA and BASARNAS, and discussing ways to combat maritime transnational crime, maritime search and rescue, maritime law enforcement, exclusive economic zone surveillance, humanitarian aid and disaster relief and maritime pollution response.

=== Joint exercise ===
In 2014, Samrat took part in the 13th joint exercise between Coast Guards of India and Japan held annually since 1999 titled Sahayog- Kaijin 2014. JCG (Japan Coast Guard Ship) Mizuho and its integral helicopter, HAL Chetak helicopter, Dornier 228 aircraft and ICGS C-404 also took part in the exercise which focuses on anti piracy procedures, pollution control measures and other areas of common professional interest.

=== MV Maersk Frankfurt incident ===
On 19 July 2024, Maritime Rescue Coordination Center (MRCC) Mumbai of ICG received distress call container carrier MV Maersk Frankfurt 50 nm off Karwar about a major fire on board. Immediately, ICGS Sahet, Sujeet and Samrata long with a Dornier and a ALH Dhruv were deployed by Coast Guard District HQ No 11 (Goa) for aerial surveillance operations. ICGS Samudra Prahari also provided support. As of 20 July, after 12 hours of effort, the fire in the front section of the ship was suppressed but the fire in the midship section was ablaze. ICG is preparing for the provision of Dry Chemical Powder (DCP) bags and balls to support firefighting operations. As of 21 July, after 24 hours of distress call, the ship was 17 miles off Karwar and ICG was battling smoke and small fires on board the container ship. ICG had decided to use DCP to douse the fire. One Filipino crew member died in the incident. The cause of the fire is expected to be a short circuit after which the fire spread to the cargo classified as International Maritime Dangerous Goods (IMDG) that was on board, according to a report. The ship was en route from Mundra port, India to Colombo port, Sri Lanka.

On 22 July, ICG's Deputy Inspector General Bhatia confirmed that the fire is under control after using 150 kg of DCP bags from helicopters. There were no fire in the dangerous goods section of the ship. Small fires were still on, four vessels of ICG were near the ship and helicopters were taking routine visits. The ship was out of danger. No oil pollution is reported but adequate preparation has been taken Indian Coast Guard has asked Karnataka, Goa and Kerala to activate the pollution response mechanism. By 30 July, Operation Sahayata was complete and a total of five ships, one Dornier and two Dhruv helicopters were deployed for the job. More than 1200 kg of DCP was used. Infrared images confirmed that hotspots has reduced and smoldering was reduced to one small part of the ship. There were no more pollution risks and the ship was stable and operational.

== See also ==
- Sankalp-class offshore patrol vessel
- ICGS Vishwast
