= Vishwast-class patrol vessel =

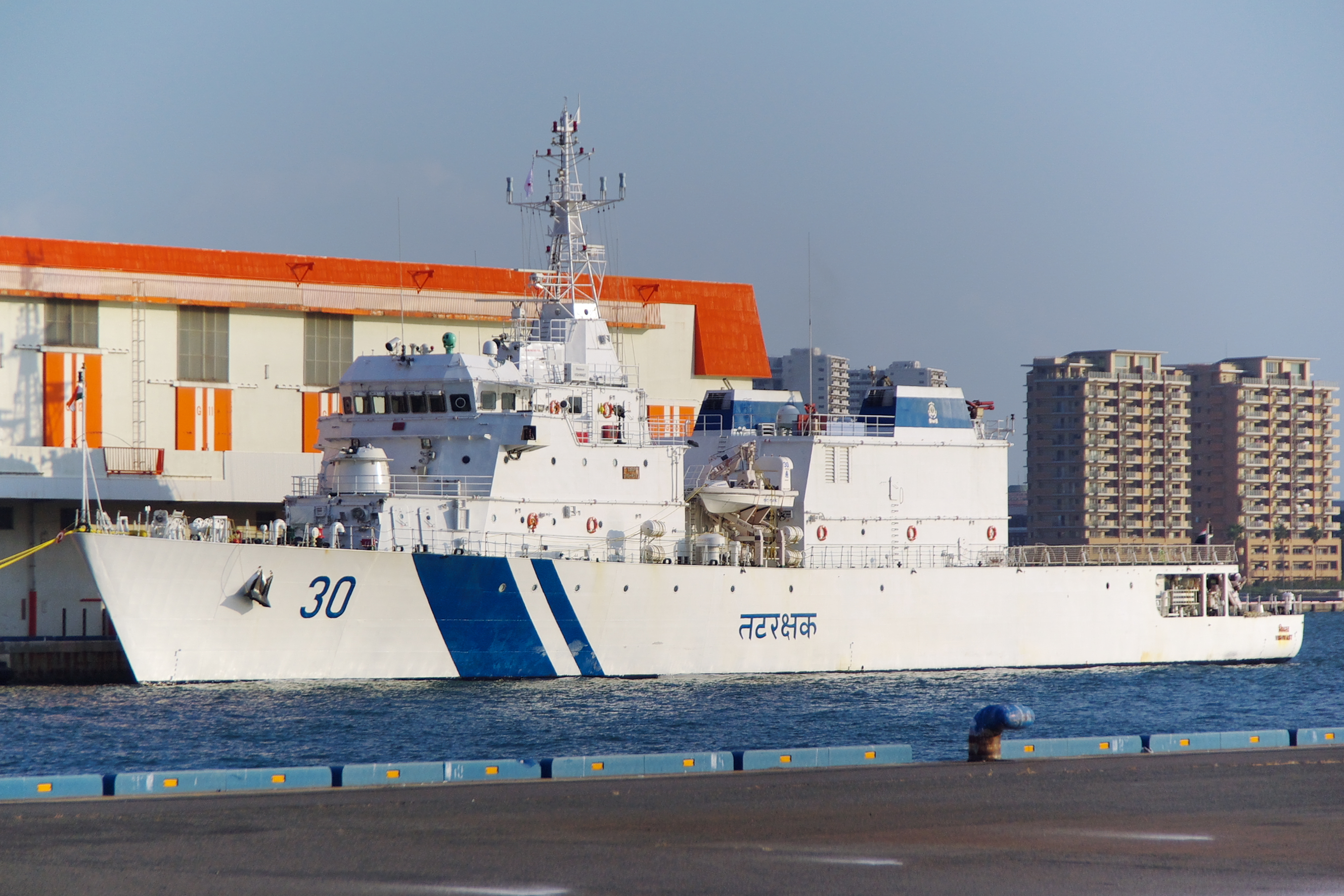
- Photograph of the Indian Coast Guard's offshore patrol vessel ICGS Vishwast (OPV-30) at the Shinko Pier No. 2, Port of Kobe, Japan.

Class overview
- Name: Vishwast class
- Builders: Goa Shipyard Limited
- Operators: Indian Coast Guard
- Preceded by: Sankalp class
- Succeeded by: Samarth class
- Planned: 3
- Completed: 3
- Active: 3

General characteristics
- Type: Offshore patrol vessel
- Displacement: 1840 tons
- Length: 94 metres (308 ft)
- Beam: 12.2 metres (40 ft)
- Draught: 4.5 metres (15 ft) (propeller)
- Depth: 3.6 metres (12 ft)
- Installed power: 18,000 kilowatts (24,000 hp)
- Speed: 26 kn (48 km/h)
- Range: 4,500 nmi (8,300 km)
- Complement: 10 officers and 98 sailors
- Armament: 30 mm CRN naval gun with SOP; 2 x 12.7 mm HMG.
- Aircraft carried: 1 x HAL Dhruv

The Vishwast-class offshore patrol vessels are series of three offshore patrol vessels built by Goa Shipyard Limited, Vasco da Gama, Goa for the Indian Coast Guard.

== Description ==
The ships in this class are 93.6 metres (307 ft 1 in) in length and are equipped with a 30 mm CRN 91 Naval Gun for policing the Exclusive Economic Zone. The vessels are designed to be propelled by two MTU engines delivering 18,000 kW (24,000 hp) of power and have a range of 4,500 nautical miles (8,300 km; 5,200 mi) at a cruising speed of 12–14 knots (22–26 km/h; 14–16 mph).

Their features include an Integrated Bridge System (IBS), Integrated Machinery Control System (IMCS), Power Management System (PMS), High Power External Fire Fighting System (ABS Fi-Fi Class-1) and one indigenous Close Range Naval Gun (CRN-91) along with an optical fire control system. They carry one helicopter and five high speed boats. The ships are also fitted with advanced Global Maritime Distress and Safety System (GMDSS).

The ships are primarily designed for patrolling and policing maritime zones, search and rescue operations, maritime surveillance, anti-smuggling operations, pollution response against oil spillages and external fire-fighting.

== Ships of the class ==
Name	Pennant Number	Date of Launch	Date of commission	Homeport
ICGS Vishwast	30	4 July 2008	17 March 2010	Port Blair
ICGS Vijit	31	4 November 2009	11 December 2010	Port Blair
ICGS Vaibhav	32	5 December 2009	21 May 2013	Tuticorin

== See also ==
- Jija Bai-class patrol vessel
- Tara Bai-class patrol vessel
- Priyadarshini-class patrol vessel
- Sarojini Naidu-class patrol vessel
