= Chakravarti =

Chakravarti may refer to:

- Chakravartin, Sanskrit term for an ideal for an emperor in ancient India
  - Bharata chakravartin, legendary emperor of India
- Chakravarti (surname) (including list of people with the name)
- Chakravartin Ashoka Samrat 2015 Indian historical drama serial about the Indian emperor Ashoka

== See also ==
- Chakravarthy (disambiguation)
- Chakraborty (name)
- King of All Kings (disambiguation), literal translation of chakravarti
