= Adipati =

Adipati is a noble title in Javanese. Holders include:

- Adipati Soejono
- Adipati Soero Adinegoro
- Adipati Surabaya, see Duchy of Surabaya

== See also ==
- Adipati Dolken, Indonesian actor
- Adhipati, a 2001 Indian film by Ravi Raja Pinisetty
- Ramathibodi (disambiguation)
