= Barom Reachea III =

Borom Reamea III បរមរាមាទី៣

King of Cambodia
- Reign: 1599 – 1600
- Coronation: 1599
- Predecessor: Borom Reachea III
- Successor: Preah Keo Fa I
- Born: Longvek, Cambodia
- Died: 1600; Srei Santhor
- Issue: None
Names
- Preahbat Samdech Preah Borom Reameathipadei
- House: List of monarchs of Cambodia
- Father: Borom Reachea II
- Religion: Buddhism

Borom Reamea III or Ponhea On (Khmer: បរមរាមាទី៣), ឬ (Khmer: ពញ្ញាអន) (Siam-call: Barom Reachea III) was the Cambodian king ruled from 1599 to 1600. After the official coronation ceremony in capital city of Srei Santhor, in 2143 BE, 1599 AD, Maha Sakarach 1522, his full name was called "Preahbat Samdech Preah Borom Reameathipadei" Ponhea On was the Forth son of King Borom Reachea II and He was the uncle of Ang Ponhea Ton, Who was assassinated by the Cham in 1599 CE, During the Siamese army's attack on Longvek city. Ponhea On did not go to Vientiane, Laos, but fled and settled only in Stung Treng Province.

== Death of Borom Reamea III ==
Ponhea On ascended the throne, succeeding Ponhea Ton, Ponhea On royal title was Borom Reameathipadei. He was a king who loved to have fun. He often went for walks outside the palace and liked to hunt wild animals. One day, Ponhea On fell in love with a woman named Neang Teav, the wife of Ponhea Thei, Ponhea On went to court her many times, but she refused, not loving the king, understanding that he was already the king. There were still those who refused, In order to win, Ponhea On ordered his army to capture Neang Teav and bring her to the royal palace. Forcing someone else's wife to be your own wife is an embarrassment in Cambodian society, where the King does not practice ethical conduct, causing the people to speak out against the King. Neang Teav, a loyal wife to her husband, starved herself to death. Ponhea Thei, her husband, was very angry with the king and took all his wealth to meet with Ponhea Keo, a trusted official closer of Ponhea Nhoum, the son of Preah Satha I, to prepare a plan to assassinate Ang Ponhea On in order to take the throne. In 1600, during the royal court's celebration of King Ponhea On's birthday, Ponhea Keo brought 700 of his followers, disguised as royal court officials and members of the royal family, to participate in the celebration. While the King was lighting the fireworks, 700 disguised of Ponhea Keo members entered to assassinate Ponhea On was deaths at that time, the Ponhea Keo group that had killed the King also withdrew. Therefore, it was forbidden for stop the king to light fireworks with his own hands anymore. The King was required to light the fireworks with a torch and then give the torch to a special official to receive and light them for him. Later, the Royal Council also decided to invite Ponhea Nhoum, the third son of Preah Satha I, to succeed Borom Reamea III. Ponhea Nhoum was named of the Royal tittle call Preah Keo Fa I.

Barom Reachea III Longvek Dynasty Born: Unknown Died: 1600
Regnal titles
Preceded by Borom Reachea III	King of Cambodia; 1599-1600	Succeeded by Keo Fa I
