= Ninh Sơn (disambiguation) =

Ninh Sơn may refer to several places in Vietnam, including

- Ninh Sơn, a commune of Khánh Hòa province
- Ninh Sơn district, a former rural district of Ninh Thuận Province
- Ninh Sơn, Ninh Bình, a former ward of Ninh Bình
- Ninh Sơn, Tây Ninh, a former ward of Tây Ninh
- Ninh Sơn, Bắc Giang, a former ward of Việt Yên
