= Thuận Bắc =

- Commune
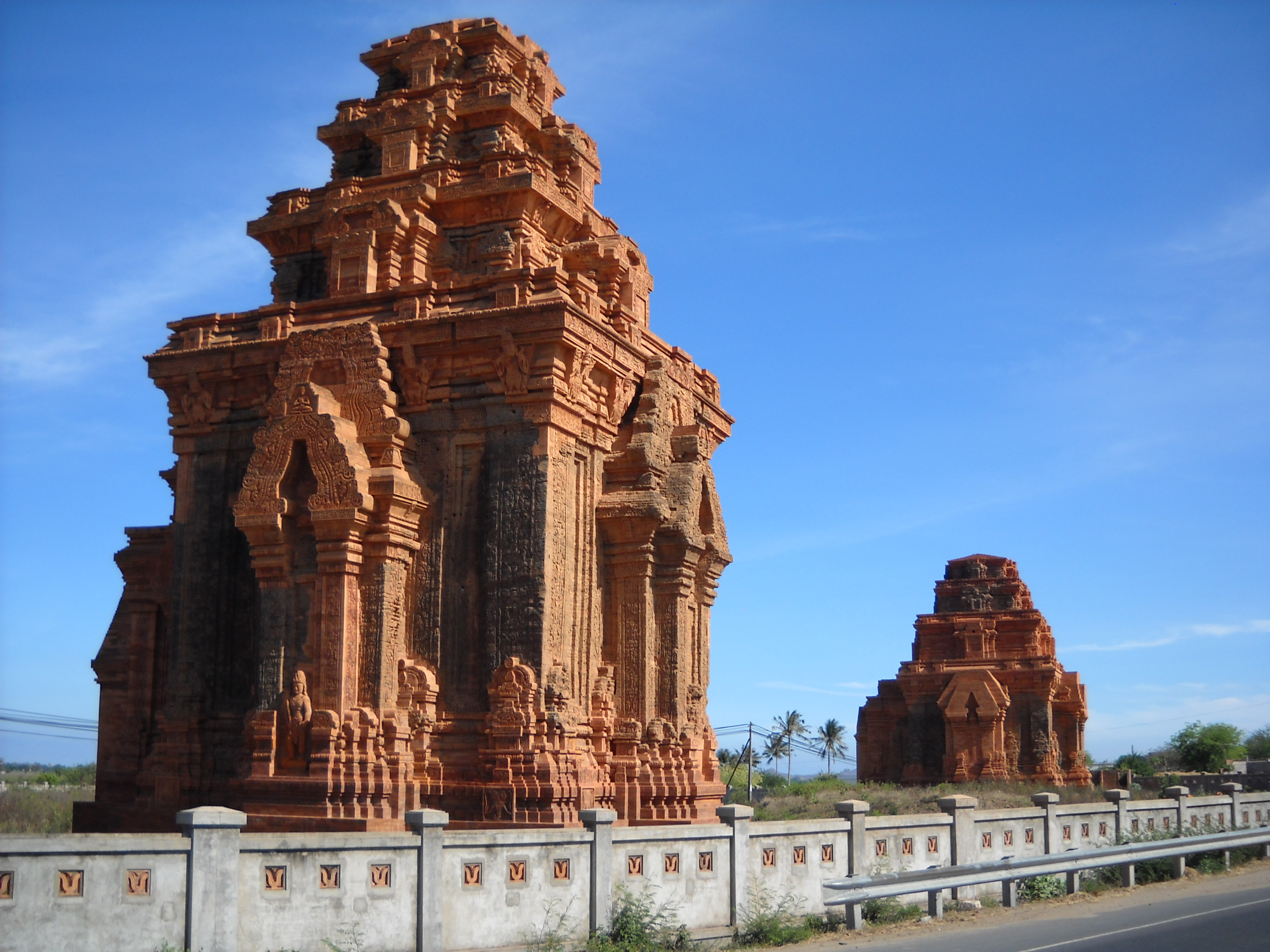
- Hòa Lai Towers
- Interactive map of Thuận Bắc
- Coordinates: 11.71647240910498°N 109.0613888727881°E
- Country: Vietnam
- Region: South Central Coast and Central Highlands
- Province: Khánh Hòa
- Established: 2025
- Administrative headquarters: Ấn Đạt Hamlet

Area
  - Total: 137.21 km^{2} (52.98 sq mi)

Population (31 December 2024)
  - Total: 25,744
  - Density: 187/km^{2} (480/sq mi)

Thuận Bắc is a commune in Khánh Hòa province, Vietnam.

On 16 June 2025, the Standing Committee of the National Assembly of Vietnam issued Resolution No. 1667/NQ-UBTVQH15 on the arrangement of commune-level administrative units in Khánh Hòa province in 2025. Under the resolution, the entire area and population of Bắc Phong, Lợi Hải, and Phước Kháng communes, formerly part of Thuận Bắc district, were merged to form a new commune named Thuận Bắc.
