= Bác Ái =

- Commune
- Interactive map of Bác Ái
- Coordinates: 11.822505217211424°N 108.86939390960114°E
- Country: Vietnam
- Region: South Central Coast and Central Highlands
- Province: Khánh Hòa
- Established: 2025
- Administrative headquarters: National Route 27B

Area
  - Total: 188.48 km^{2} (72.77 sq mi)

Population (31 December 2024)
  - Total: 12,270
  - Density: 65/km^{2} (170/sq mi)
- Website: bacai.khanhhoa.gov.vn

Bác Ái is a commune in Khánh Hòa province, Vietnam.

On 16 June 2025, the Standing Committee of the National Assembly of Vietnam issued Resolution No. 1667/NQ-UBTVQH15 on the arrangement of commune-level administrative units in Khánh Hòa province in 2025. Under the resolution, the entire area and population of Phước Tiến, Phước Thắng, and Phước Chính communes, formerly part of Bác Ái district, were merged to form a new commune named Bác Ái.
