= Bác Ái district =

District of Ninh Thuận, Vietnam

- District
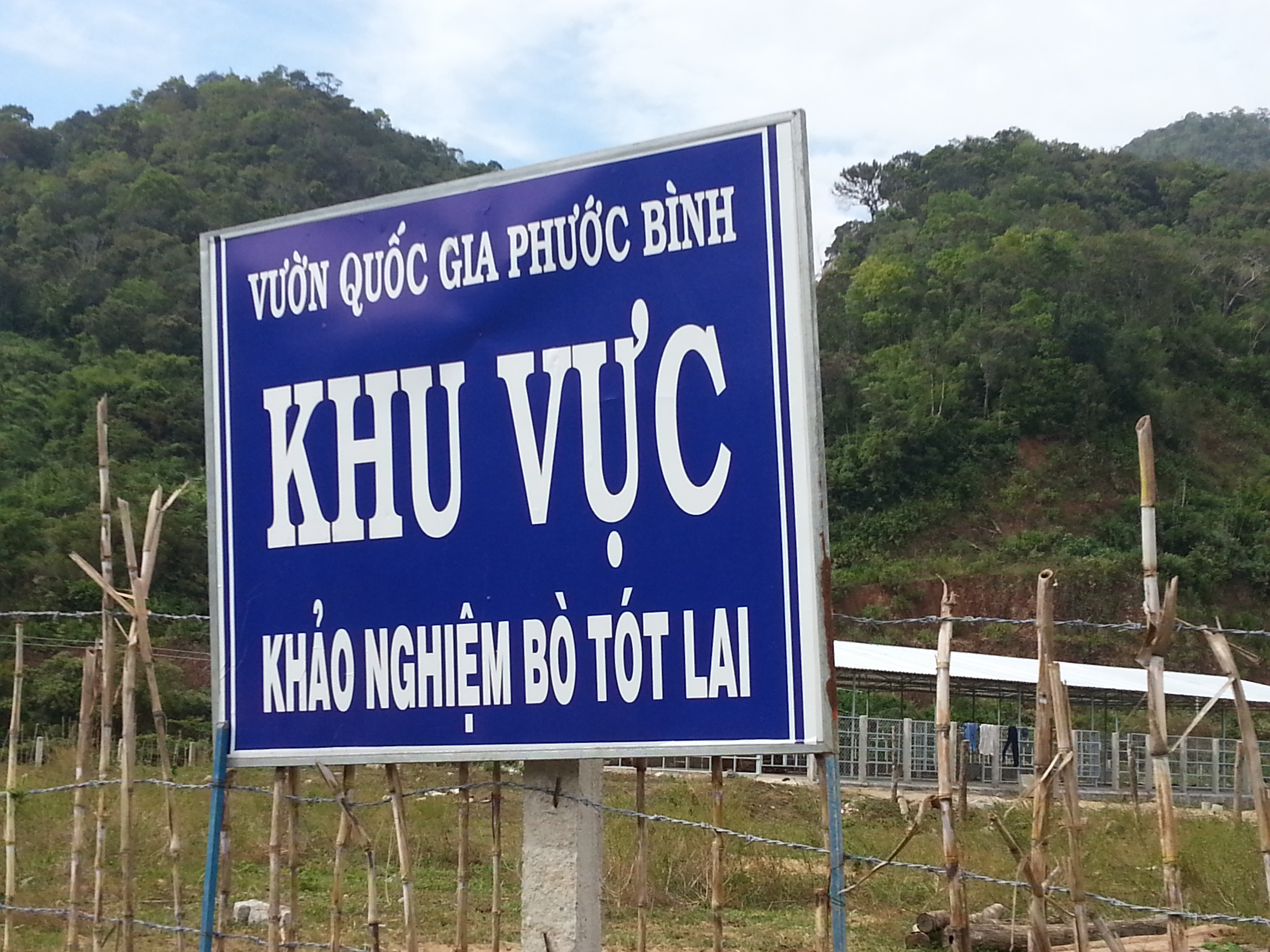
- Road sign leading to Bác Ái District
- Interactive map of Bác Ái district
- Location of in Vietnam Bác Ái district (Southeast Asia) Bác Ái district (Asia)
- Coordinates: 11°54′N 108°50′E
- Country: Vietnam
- Province: Ninh Thuận
- Capital: Phước Đại commune

Area
  - Total: 122 sq mi (316 km^{2})
  - Land: 0.39661 sq mi (1.02722 km^{2})

Population (2003)
  - Total: 121,050
  - Density: 78/sq mi (30/km^{2})
- Time zone: UTC+07:00 (Indochina Time)
- Climate: Aw
- Website: https://bacai.ninhthuan.gov.vn/portal/Pages/default.aspx

Bác Ái is a former district (huyện) of Ninh Thuận province in southeastern Vietnam.

As of 2003 the district had a population of 19,631. The district covers an area of 1,031 km^{2} (398 sq mi). The district capital lies at Phước Đại.

== Geography ==
Bac Ai district is located in the northwest of Ninh Thuan province, geographically:

- The east borders Thuan Bac district and Cam Ranh city, Khanh Hoa province
- The west borders Lac Duong district and Don Duong district of Lam Dong province
- The south borders Ninh Son district, Ninh Hai district and Phan Rang - Thap Cham city
- The north borders Khanh Son district and Khanh Vinh district in Khanh Hoa province.

== History ==
Before 2000, Bác Ái district belonged to Ninh Sơn district.
