= Ninh Sơn =

- Commune
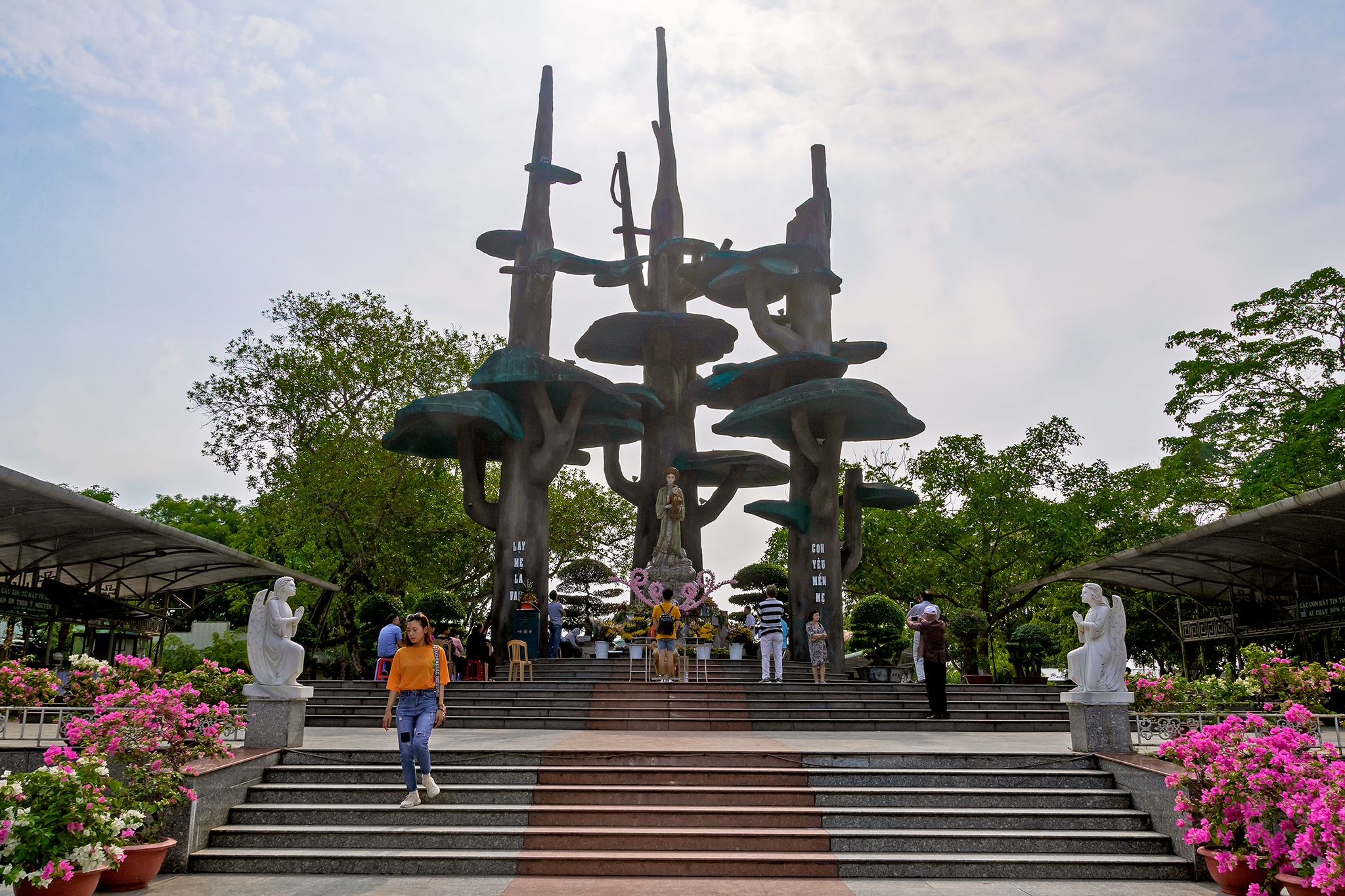
- La Vang Holy Mother Monument
- Interactive map of Ninh Sơn
- Coordinates: 11.775699657444664°N 108.78521526515308°E
- Country: Vietnam
- Region: South Central Coast and Central Highlands
- Province: Khánh Hòa
- Established: 2025
- Administrative headquarters: 219 Lê Duẩn Street, Hamlet 3

Area
  - Total: 99.33 km^{2} (38.35 sq mi)

Population (31 December 2024)
  - Total: 32,003
  - Density: 322/km^{2} (830/sq mi)
- Website: ninhson.khanhhoa.gov.vn

Ninh Sơn is a commune in Khánh Hòa province, Vietnam.

On 16 June 2025, the Standing Committee of the National Assembly of Vietnam issued Resolution No. 1667/NQ-UBTVQH15 on the arrangement of commune-level administrative units in Khánh Hòa province in 2025. Under the resolution, the entire area and population of Tân Sơn township and Quảng Sơn commune, formerly part of Ninh Sơn district, were merged to form a new commune named Ninh Sơn.
