= Ninh Hải district =

District of Vietnam

Coordinates: 11.667°N 109.083°E

Ninh Hải is a former district (huyện) of Ninh Thuận province in the South Central Coast region of Vietnam.

== Geography ==
It is located along the coast of northeastern Ninh Thuận, not far from (although not bordering) Cam Ranh in Khánh Hòa province. It borders the provincial capital, Phan Rang–Tháp Chàm, as well as Bác Ái district.

Most of the district is mountainous, especially in the eastern part along the coast. The highest point is Chúa mountain (núi Chúa) at the border to Thuận Bắc district. Núi Chúa National Park is also located in the district.

== Infrastructure ==
Provincial road 702 connects Vĩnh Hy in the northeast of the district to Phan Rang. National Route 1 and the North–South Railway run through the west of the district. There is a small port in the north at Vịnh Vĩnh Hy.

== Demography ==
There is a minority of Raglai people in the district. Some of them live in the mountains near Vịnh Vĩnh Hy in the northeast.

== Tourism ==
Between the National Park and Vịnh Vĩnh Hy is Aman Resorts' five star franchise hotel known as Amanoi. This is the only Aman resort in Vietnam.
