= Amanoi =

Resort hotel in Vietnam

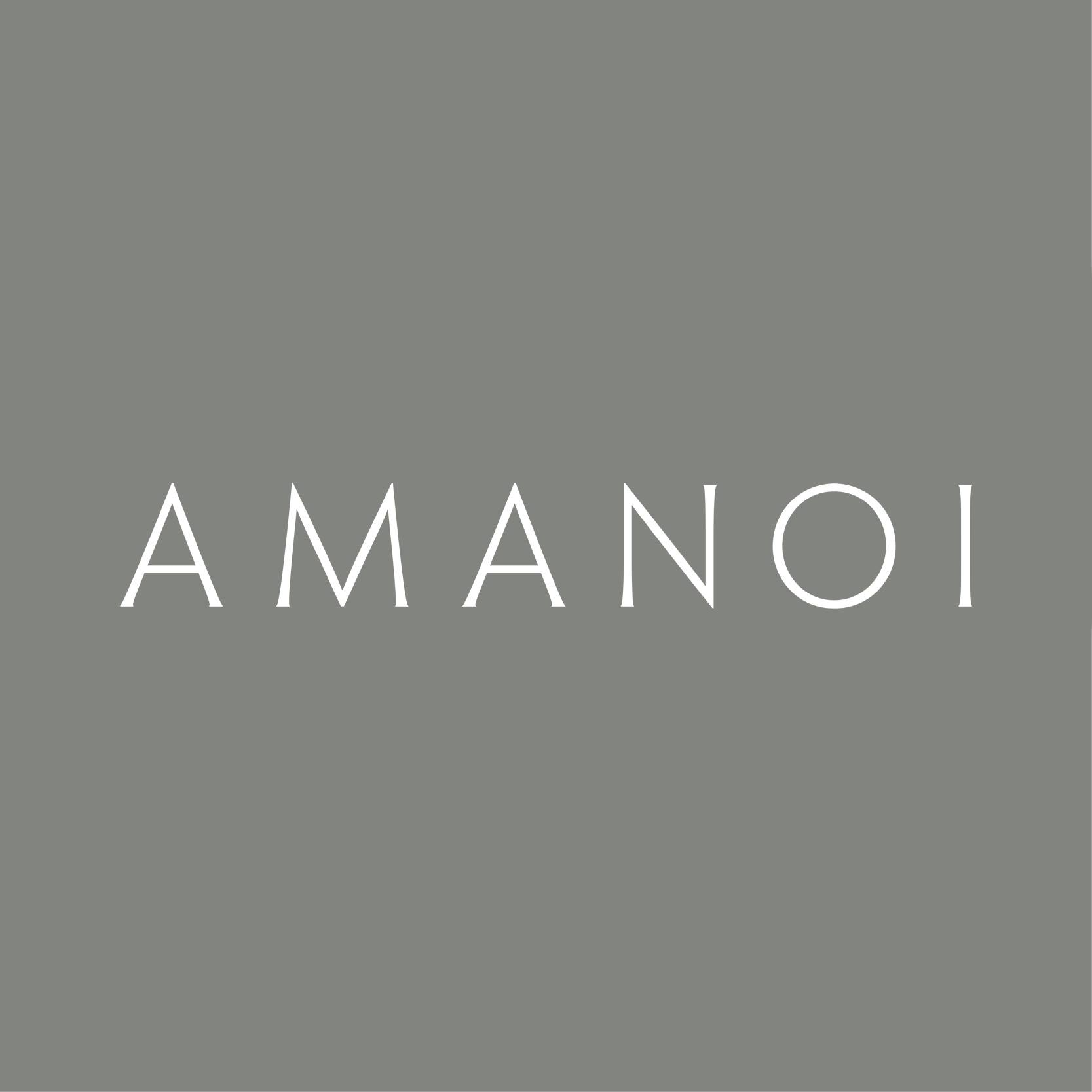
- Interactive map of the Amanoi area

General information
- Location: Vinh Hy Village, Vinh Hai Commune, Ninh Hải District, Ninh Thuận Province, Vietnam
- Opening: September 2013
- Owner: Aman Resorts
- Operator: Aman Resorts

Design and construction
- Architect: Jean-Michel Gathy

Other information
- Number of suites: 36

Website
- https://www.aman.com/resorts/amanoi

Amanoi is a five star luxury hotel belonging to the international group of Aman Resorts, located in Ninh Thuận Province, Vietnam. It opened in September 2013, and was Aman's 26th property to open around the world and the first in Vietnam.

== Geography ==
Amanoi is situated between Vịnh Vĩnh Hy (Vĩnh Hy Bay) and the Núi Chúa National Park, nearby to unique rock formations, a marine reserve and dunes. The resort is located 55 kilometers south of Cam Ranh International Airport on the coastline south of Nha Trang.

== Architecture and facilities ==
The 100-acre, 31 villas luxury hotel facility was built by Jean-Michel Gathy of Kuala Lumpur-based Deniston Architects. It includes a Central Pavilion, taking inspiration from a traditional Vietnamese communal hall. There are two swimming pools, one Cliff Pool next to the Central Pavilion and one at the Beach Club. It also includes five villas that have private chefs and butlers and are free-standing structures made to look like traditional Vietnamese village houses. The Aman Spa is surrounded by the National Park's hills.

== Awards ==
Amanoi has won a variety of hotel industry awards, including:

- Conde Nast Traveler - 2014 Hot List
- Travel + Leisure - It List: The Best New Hotels 2014
- Harper's Bazaar Singapore – Spa Awards 2014
- Andrew Harper – Grand Awards 2015
- World Travel Awards – Asia's Leading Boutique Resort 2016
