= Phước Bình National Park =

National park in Vietnam

- IUCN category II (national park)
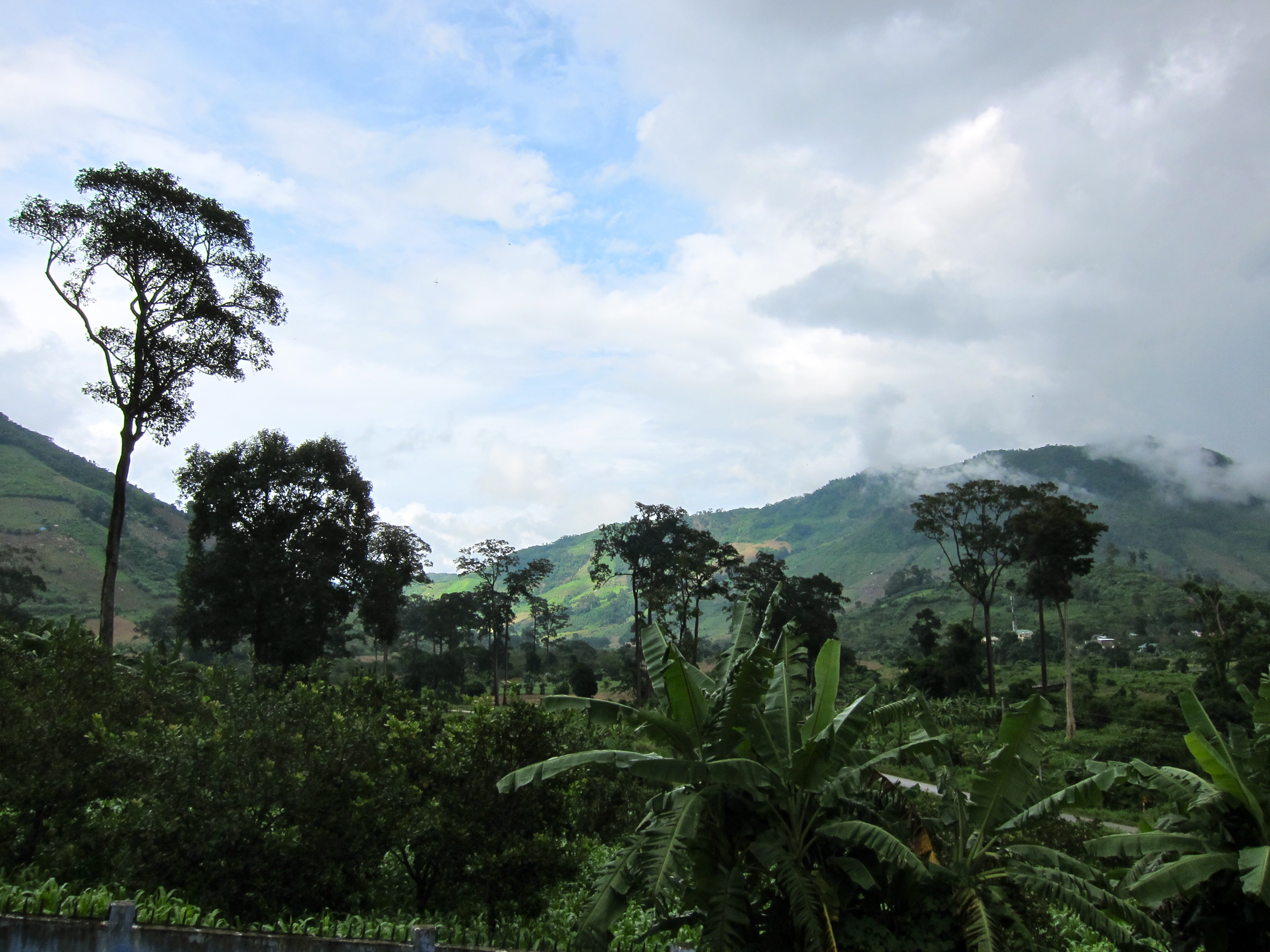
- Phuoc Binh from National Park office

- Location within Vietnam
- Location: Khánh Hòa Province, Việt Nam
- Nearest city: Đồng Nai
- Coordinates: 12°04′16″N 108°45′02″E
- Area: 19,814 km^{2} (7,650 sq mi)
- Established: 2006
- Governing body: People's Committee of Ninh Thuận Province

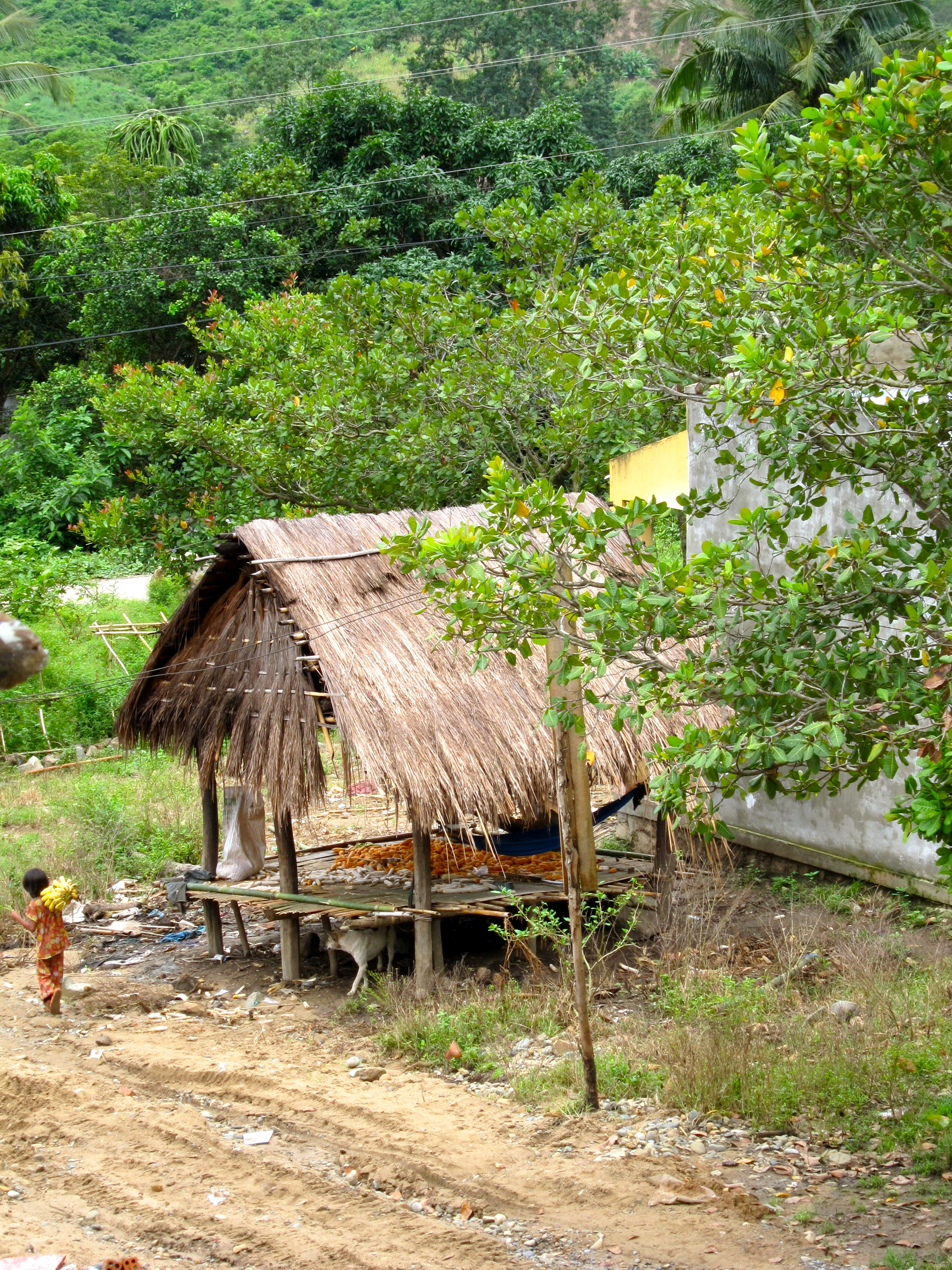
Raglay collecting bananas PBNP

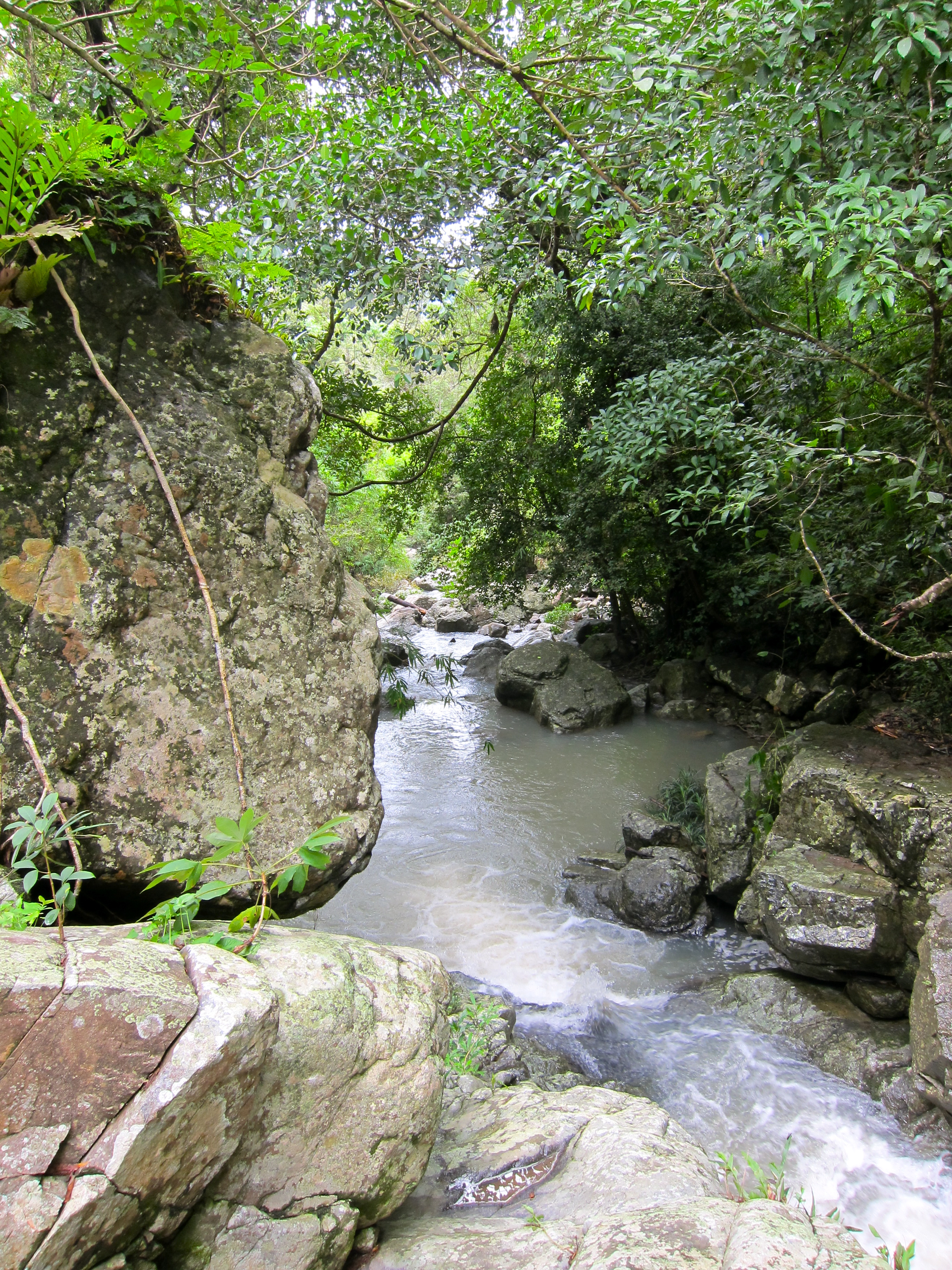
Waterfall PBNP

Phước Bình National Park (Vietnamese: Vườn quốc gia Phước Bình) is a national park in the commune of Bác Ái Tây, Khánh Hòa Province. It is located 62 km north-west from Phan Rang ward, on the border with Lâm Đồng province. Phước Bình National Park was classified as a nature reserve by Decision 125/2002/QD dated 26 September 2002. On 8 June 2006 it was established as a national park under Decision number 822/QĐ-TTg dated 8 June 2006 by then Vice Prime Minister of Vietnam Nguyễn Tấn Dũng.

Phước Bình National Park lies on the eastern slopes of the Đà Lạt plateau in the transition area between three regions: south-east, south-central and Central Highlands of Vietnam. It is dominated by several high peaks in the west (up to 2,200 m above sea level), while the east of the site decreases in elevation towards the coastal plain of south-central Vietnam.

The total area of the park is 19,814 ha, comprising:

- Strict protection zone 10,766 ha
- Rehabilitation zone: 9,030 ha
- Administration & service area 18 ha
- Plus a buffer zone of 11,080 ha.

Wet season occurs between May and late November, with September having the highest rainfall. The average rainfall is about 1,000 mm in the low elevation areas, and up to about 2,000 mm in the mountainous areas. There are three main streams with small tributaries: Gia Nhông (suối Ông), Đa Mây (sông Trương) and sông Hàm Leo. These three streams are the main watershed for the Cai River, which supplies the whole province's water requirements for domestic water, agricultural production (particularly irrigated rice) and industrial parks.

Phước Bình National Park also contains the historic wartime battlefield at Pi Nang Tac's stone trap, where in 1965 during the Vietnam War over 100 soldiers were killed. Pi Nang Tac led the guerrilla army's battle to build an ambush stone trap.

== Biodiversity values ==
Phước Bình National Park is contiguous with Bi Doup – Nui Ba National Park in Lâm Đồng Province to the west, and provides an important biodiversity corridor and core habitat as well as being an area of significant cultural history to the local ethnic communities. It also plays an essential role in protecting the Cai River watershed. This is the largest river in Ninh Thuận province, and provides water to all of Ninh Thuận Province, one of Vietnam's most arid regions.

The area is of high landscape and biodiversity value containing many plants and animals typical of rare sub-tropical ecosystems. It has over 1225 plant and 327 animal species, many of which are included in the IUCN Red List.

Phước Bình National Park is part of the Southern Annamite Ecoregion, one of the four Global Ecoregions in the southern region of Vietnam. It includes the Southern Annamite Montane Rain Forests terrestrial ecoregion. The park covers a broad topographic range and supports lowland dry dipterocarp forests and wet evergreen forests, as well as montane evergreen forests, mixed broad-leaf and tropical conifer forests. The montane communities remain cold and wet for most of the year and are therefore able to support a community more associated with temperate conditions.

75 species of plants threatened at global or national level have been discovered in Phước Bình National Park. 36 species are listed in the Vietnam Red Book of Flora, and 58 are included in the IUCN Red List. The conifer, Pinus dalatensis, also occurs in Phước Bình National Park. This species is known from fewer than 10 distinct locations and there has been a continuing decline in the area, extent and quality of its habitat. The majority of the populations are limited to less than 100 mature trees each.

The southern rain forests are home to 410 different bird species and 122 mammal species, of which 69 mammal species (including an estimated two herds of 40 gaur) and 206 bird species are found in Phuoc Binh National Park.

Flagship fauna species for Phước Bình National Park include:

- Gaur (Bos gaurus) – IUCN Red List vulnerable
- Giant muntjac (Muntiacus vuquangensis) – IUCN Red List endangered, only known from Annamite mountain range
- Bear macaque (Macaca arctoides) – IUCN Red List vulnerable
- Black-shanked douc langur (Pygathrix nigripes) – IUCN Red List endangered
- Yellow-cheeked gibbon (Nomascus gabriellae) – IUCN Red List endangered
- Great hornbill (Buceros bicornis) – IUCN Red List near threatened
- Vietnam greenfinch (Carduelis monguilloti) – IUCN Red List near threatened, endemic to Da Lat plateau
- Spot-breasted laughingthrush (Garrulax merulinus) – IUCN Red List least concern
- Collared laughingthrush (Garrulax yersini) – IUCN Red List endangered, endemic to the Da Lat plateau

Phước Bình National Park is particularly valuable as habitat for native birds – five of the eight restricted-range species that occur in the Da Lat Plateau Endemic Bird Area (EBA) occur in Phước Bình National Park, including two globally threatened species: collared laughingthrush and crested argus (Rheinardia ocellata). It also supports a subspecies of the spot-breasted laughingthrush (Garrulax merulinus annamensis) that is only known from three other Important Bird Areas (IBAs). This form is endemic to the Da Lat Plateau, and is considered by some authors to be a distinct species. Phuoc Binh National Park is also one of only six IBAs in Vietnam to support the globally vulnerable pale-capped pigeon (Columba punicea).

== Conservation issues ==
There are six villages with 876 households (about 4,438 people) living in the buffer zone of the national park. The Raglay minority group makes up about 74% of the population, the remainder being Churu and Kinh. The level of education is generally low, and the population is mainly dependent on forest resources. Agricultural production, that is, cultivation and livestock, is the key economic activity. The most common food crops are rice, maize, sweet potato, and cassava. Perennial cash crops include cashew and coffee, as well as banana, mango, pomelo, and durian. The local people also hunt and trap wildlife and harvest other non-timber forest products such as resin and medicinal plants.

Anthropogenic influences, in the form of regular burning to create open woodlands and shifting cultivation, are pervasive throughout the ecoregion. Shifting cultivation is prevalent in the upper slopes. Clearing forested area for coffee plantations is another potential threat to habitats, while wildlife poaching and excessive harvesting of non-timber forest products are severe threats at the species level. Many if not all species endemic to these forests are potentially at severe risk in the short term and probably still at high risk in the long-term.

More than 75 percent of the natural habitat has been converted or degraded. The remaining forest is distributed in small, isolated fragments. This is a result of long-term cultivation, especially between 1976 and 2002, and chemical warfare. In addition, the area has a relatively arid climate, and forest fires are quite common.

== Ecotourism ==
While some biodiversity, ecological and cultural values are being partially degraded, the most important values have not been significantly impacted. Ecotourism activities available in Phước Bình National Park include hiking, rafting, swimming in streams and waterholes, camping, and learning about the culture and lifestyle of the local people.
