= Khánh Sơn district =

Coordinates: 12.000°N 108.917°E

Khánh Sơn district Huyện Khánh Sơn
- District
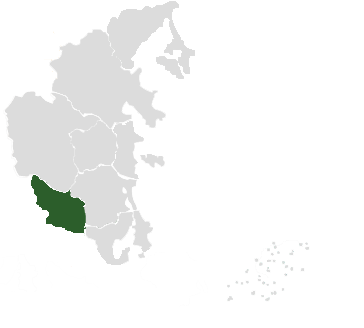
- Khánh Sơn highlighted in the province map
- Country: Vietnam
- Region: South Central Coast
- Province: Khánh Hòa
- Capital: Tô Hạp

Area
  - Total: 130 sq mi (337 km^{2})

Population (2003)
  - Total: 18,368
  - Density: 141/sq mi (54.5/km^{2})
- Time zone: UTC+7 (Indochina Time)

Khánh Sơn is a former rural district (huyện) of Khánh Hòa province in the South Central Coast region of Vietnam. As of 2003 the district had a population of 18,368. The district covers an area of 337 km^{2} (130 sq mi). The district capital lies at Tô Hạp.
