= Thuận Bắc district =

District in Vietnam

Coordinates: 11°42′55″N 109°03′36″E

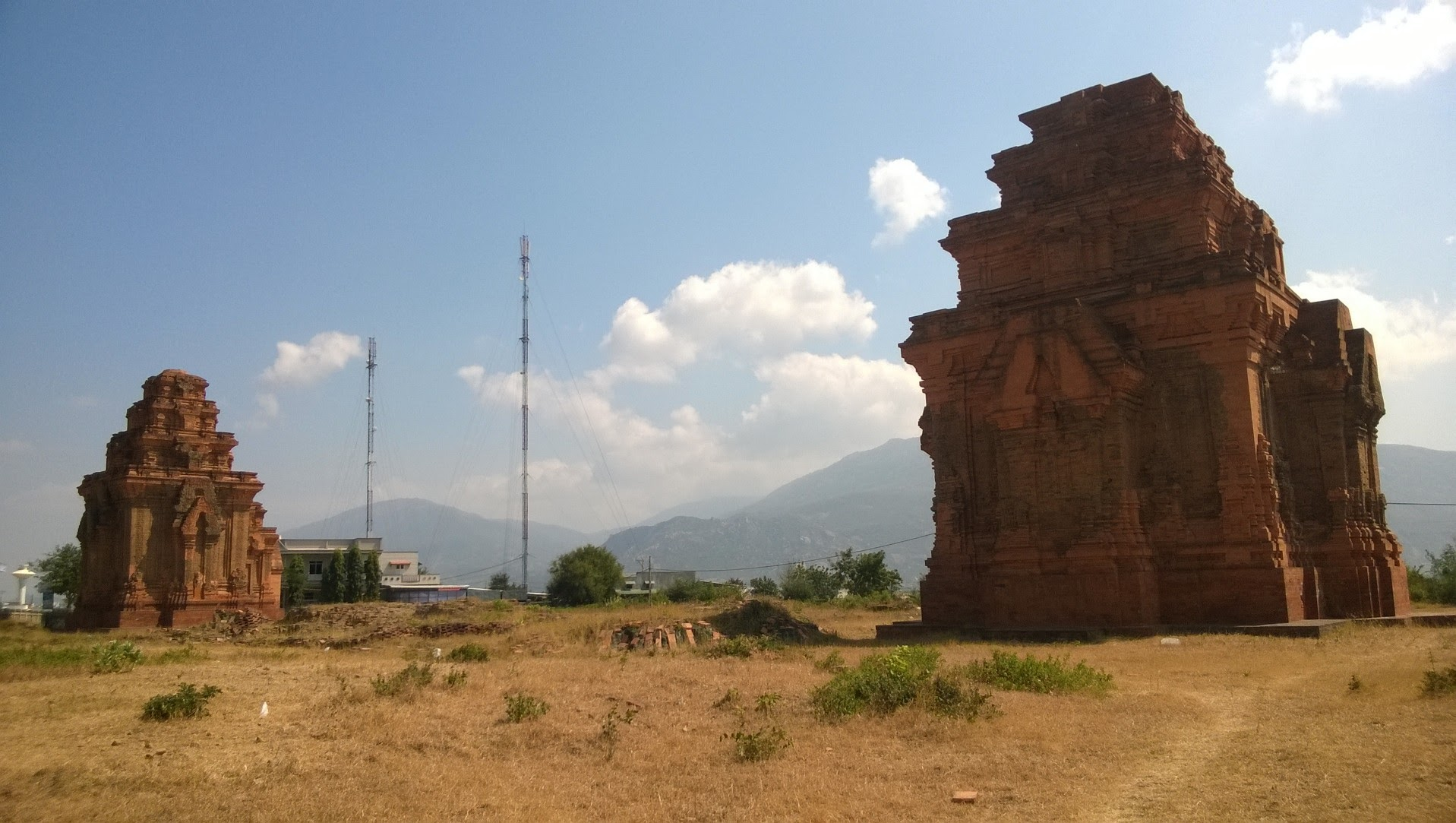
Ba Tháp historic museum

Thuận Bắc is a former district (huyện) of Ninh Thuận province in the Southeast region of Vietnam.

== Geography ==
Thuan Bac district is located in the northeast of Ninh Thuan province, geographically:

- The northeast borders the East Sea (South China Sea)
- The west borders Bac Ai
- The east and south of the district borders Ninh Hai
- The north borders Cam Ranh city, Khanh Hoa province.

Thuan Bac district has an area of 318.26 km^{2} (122.88 sq mi), population in 2019 is 43,322 people, population density reaches 136 people/km^{2}

== History ==
Before 2005, Thuan Bac district belonged to Ninh Hai district.

In 2025, the district was reorganized into Ninh Hải Commune, Thuận Bắc Commune, and Công Hải Commune.
