= Ninh Sơn district =

Coordinates: 11.833°N 108.833°E

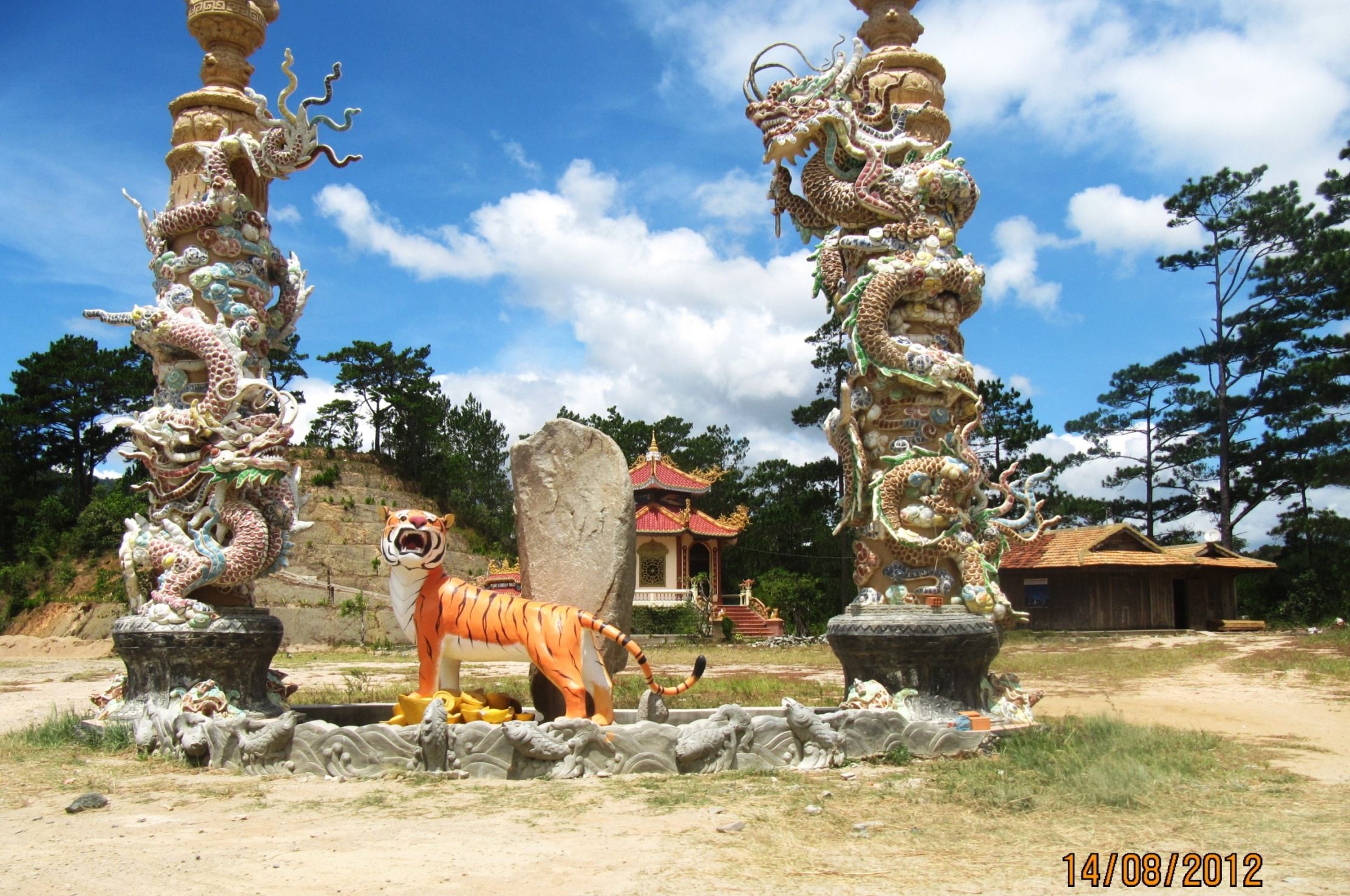
- Tourist attraction on top of Sông Pha pass
- Interactive map of Ninh Sơn district
- Country: Vietnam
- Region: South Central Coast
- Province: Ninh Thuận
- Established: 1958
- Seat: Tan Son Town

Area
  - City: 771.81 km^{2} (298.00 sq mi)
- Elevation: 101 m (331 ft)

Population (2019)
  - City: 71,888
  - Density: 93/km^{2} (240/sq mi)
  - Urban: 11,301
  - Rural: 60,587

Ninh Sơn is a former district (huyện) of Ninh Thuận province in the Southeast region of Vietnam. Established in 1958, it covers an area of 771.81 km^{2} (298.00 sq mi), and in 2017 had a population of 76,664 people.

== Divisions ==
The district contains one town (thị trấn) Tân Sơn and seven communes (xã): Hòa Sơn, Lâm Sơn, Lương Sơn, Ma Nới, Mỹ Sơn, Nhơn Sơn and Quảng Sơn.

== History ==
Ninh Son is established on September 1, 1981 by dividing An Son district into Ninh Phuoc district and Ninh Son district of Thuan Hai province.

In 2000, 9 communes were separated: Phuoc Binh, Phuoc Chinh, Phuoc Dai, Phuoc Hoa, Phuoc Tan, Phuoc Thang, Phuoc Thanh, Phuoc Tien and Phuoc Trung to re-establish Bac Ai district.

== Geography ==
Ninh Son district is located in the west of Ninh Thuan province, 36 km from Phan Rang - Thap Cham city, 74 km from Da Lat city, 52 km from Cam Ranh city, with geographical location:

- The north and northwest border Bac Ai district.
- The east borders Phan Rang - Thap Cham.
- The southeast borders Ninh Phuoc district and Thuan Nam district.
- The west borders Don Duong district, Lam Dong province.
- The southwest borders Duc Trong district, Lam Dong Province.
- The south borders Tuy Phong district, Binh Thuan Province.

== Climate ==
Ninh Son district is located in the most typical semi-arid tropical climate zone, with outstanding characteristics of little rain, heat and high evaporation: The further towards the Northwest, the more humidity increases, the more rain, and the cooler temperature due to the influence near the Lam Vien plateau.

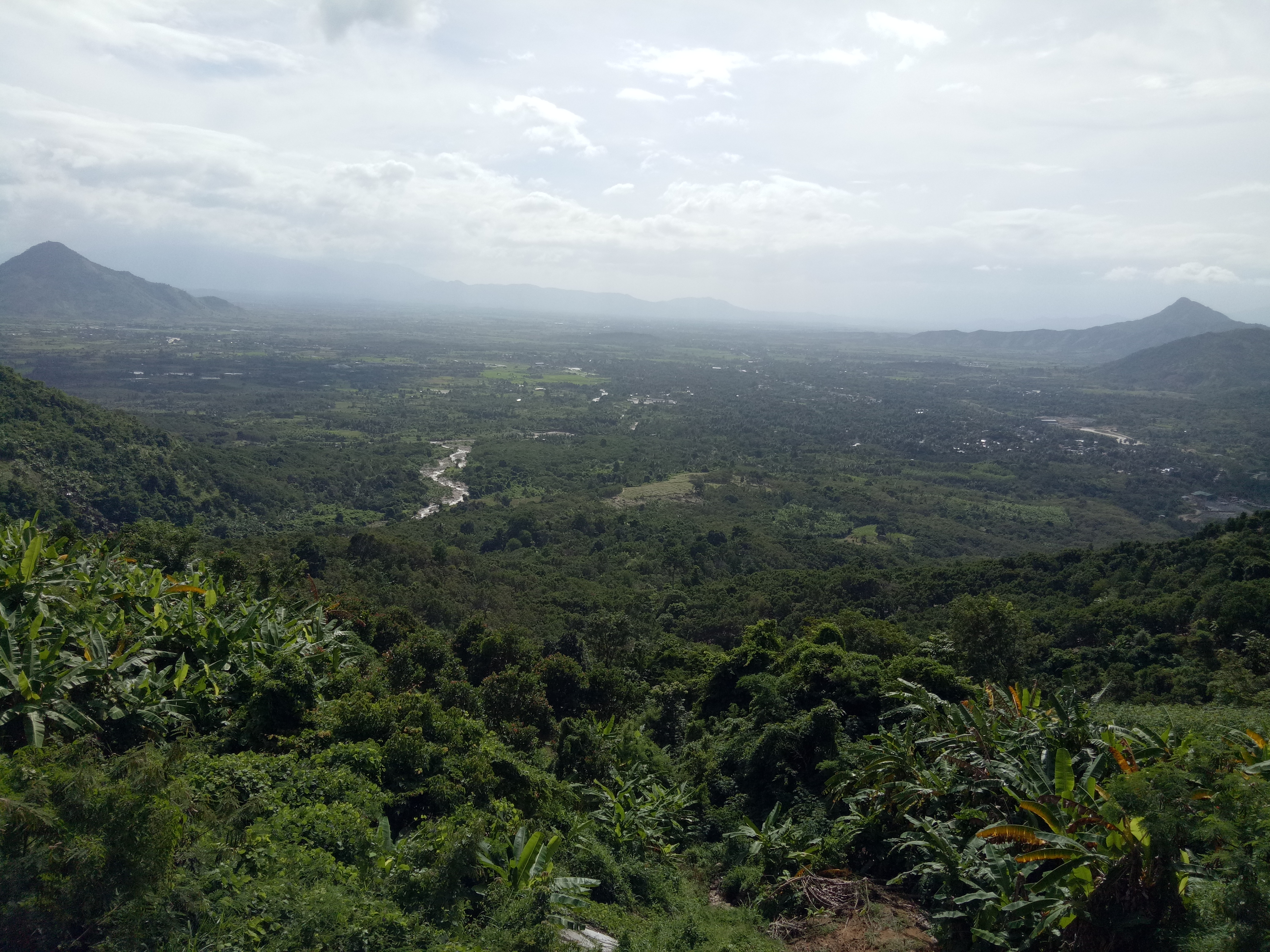
Ninh Sơn seen from Ngoạn Mục pass

The system of rivers and streams flowing through Ninh Sơn includes Cai River, Ong River and other rivers, streams and canals, helping to regulate temperature: reducing heat in summer and increasing humidity in winter.

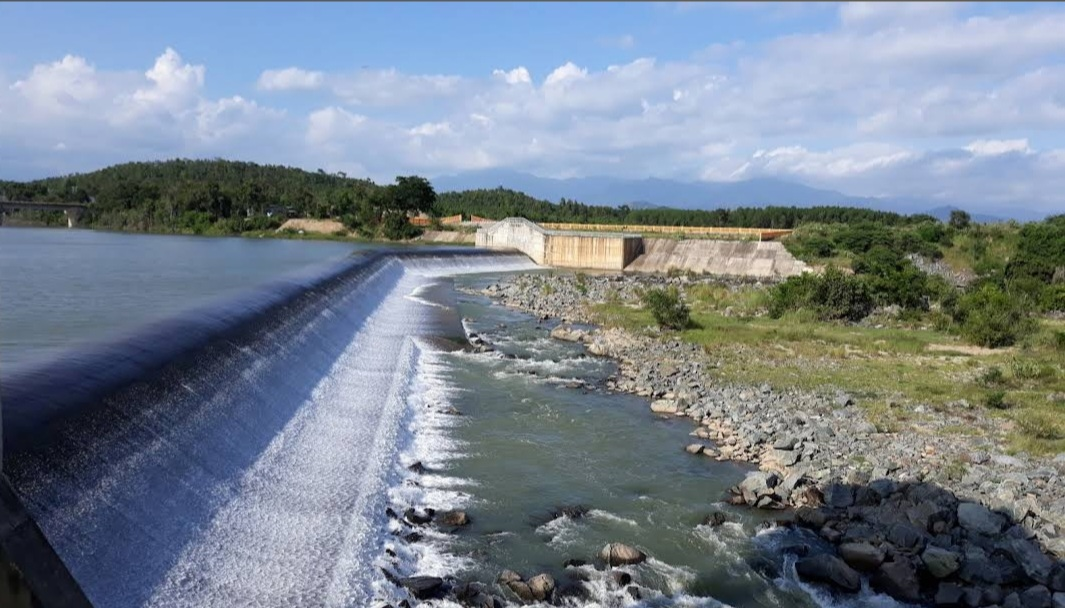
Tan My Dam in Tan Sơn town

== Transport ==
Ninh Son is the intersection of National Highway 27 and National Highway 27B in Tan Son town, serving as a transit place between Cam Ranh, Da Lat and Phan Rang. There is also the intersection of National Highway 27B and Provincial Road 656.

The North–South Expressway East passes through in Nhon Son commune (near Nha Ho).

== Villages ==
- Nha Hố
