= Ninh Thuận province =

Former province of Vietnam

Ninh Thuận Phan Rang
- Province
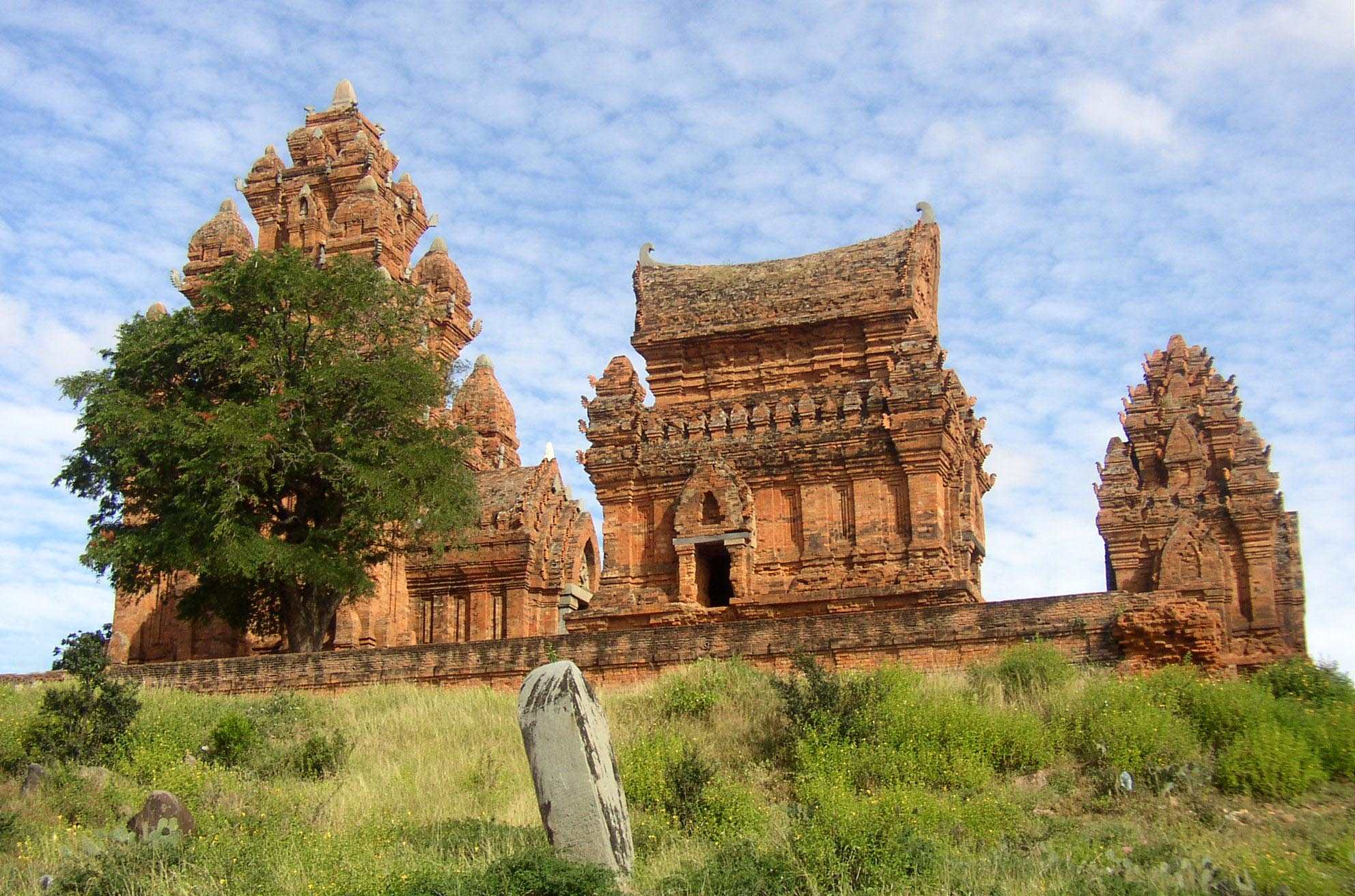
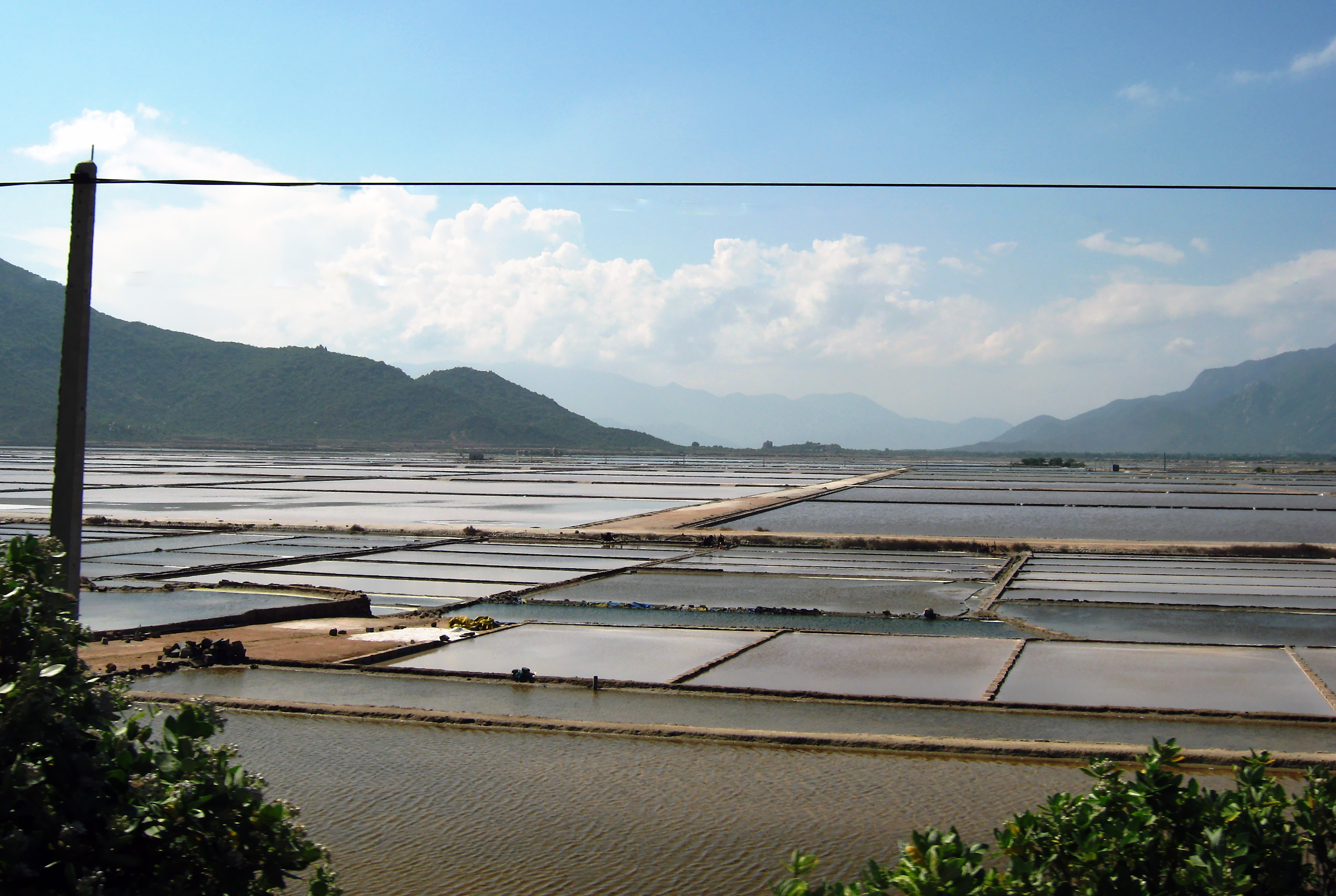
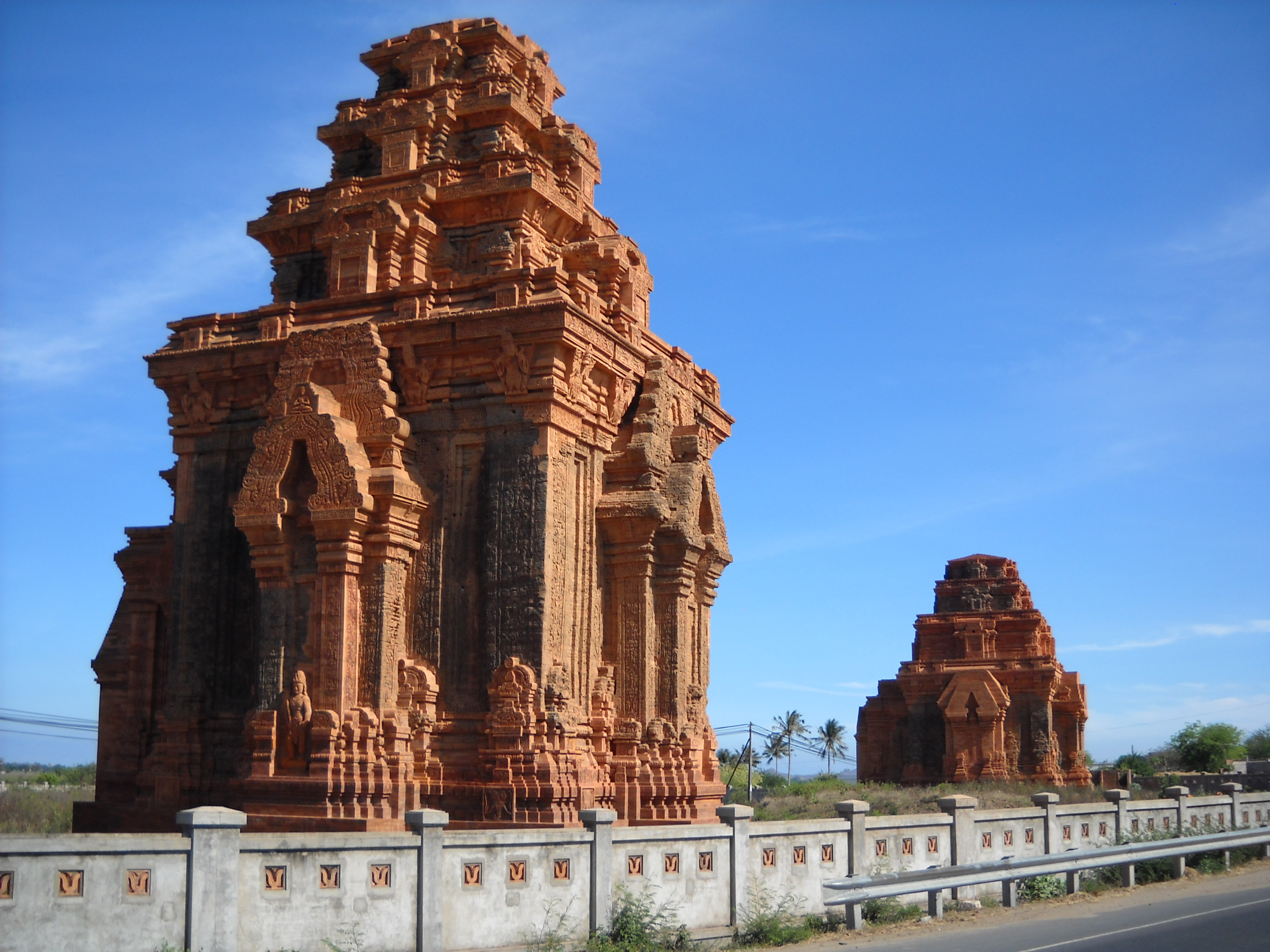
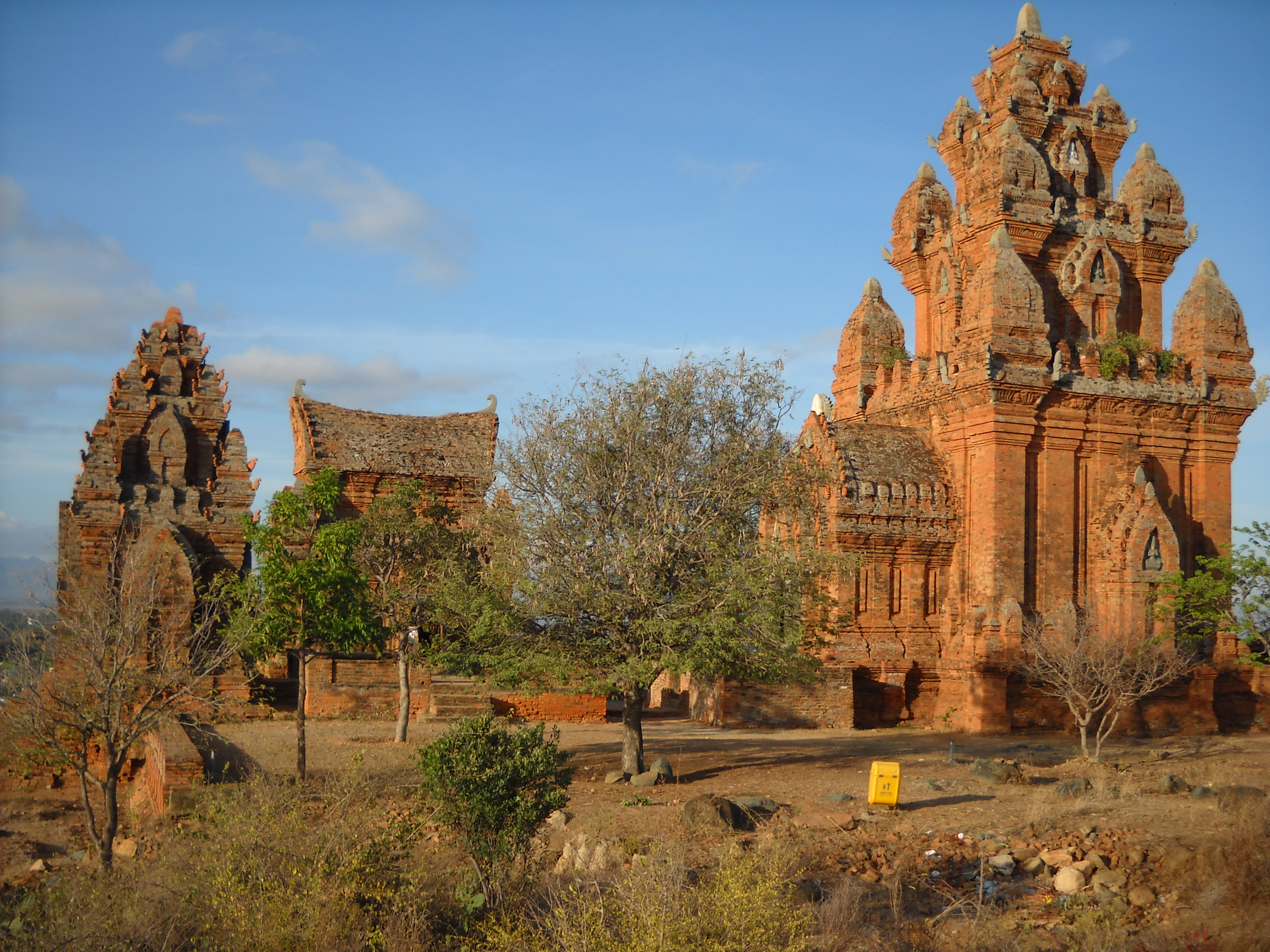
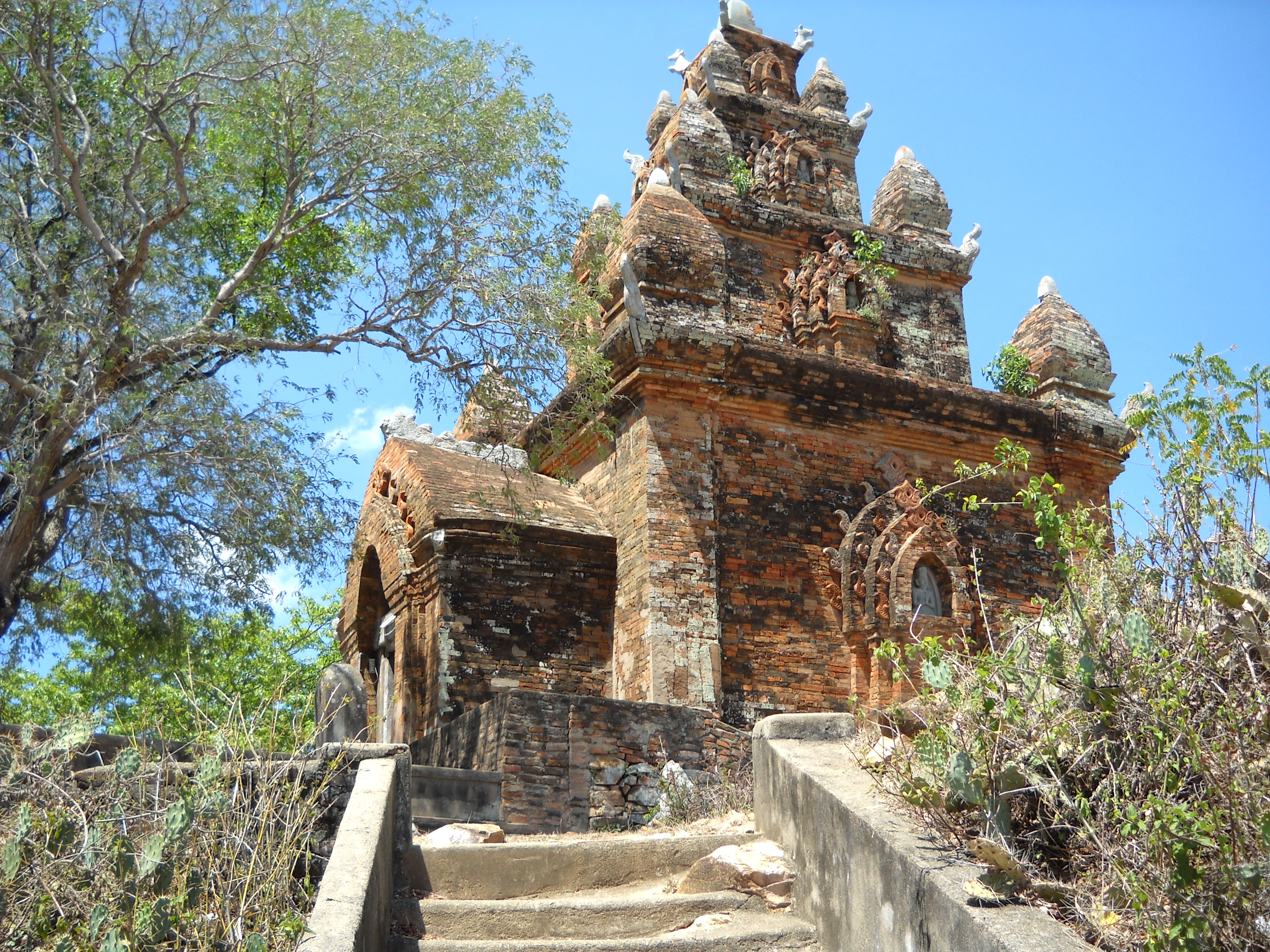
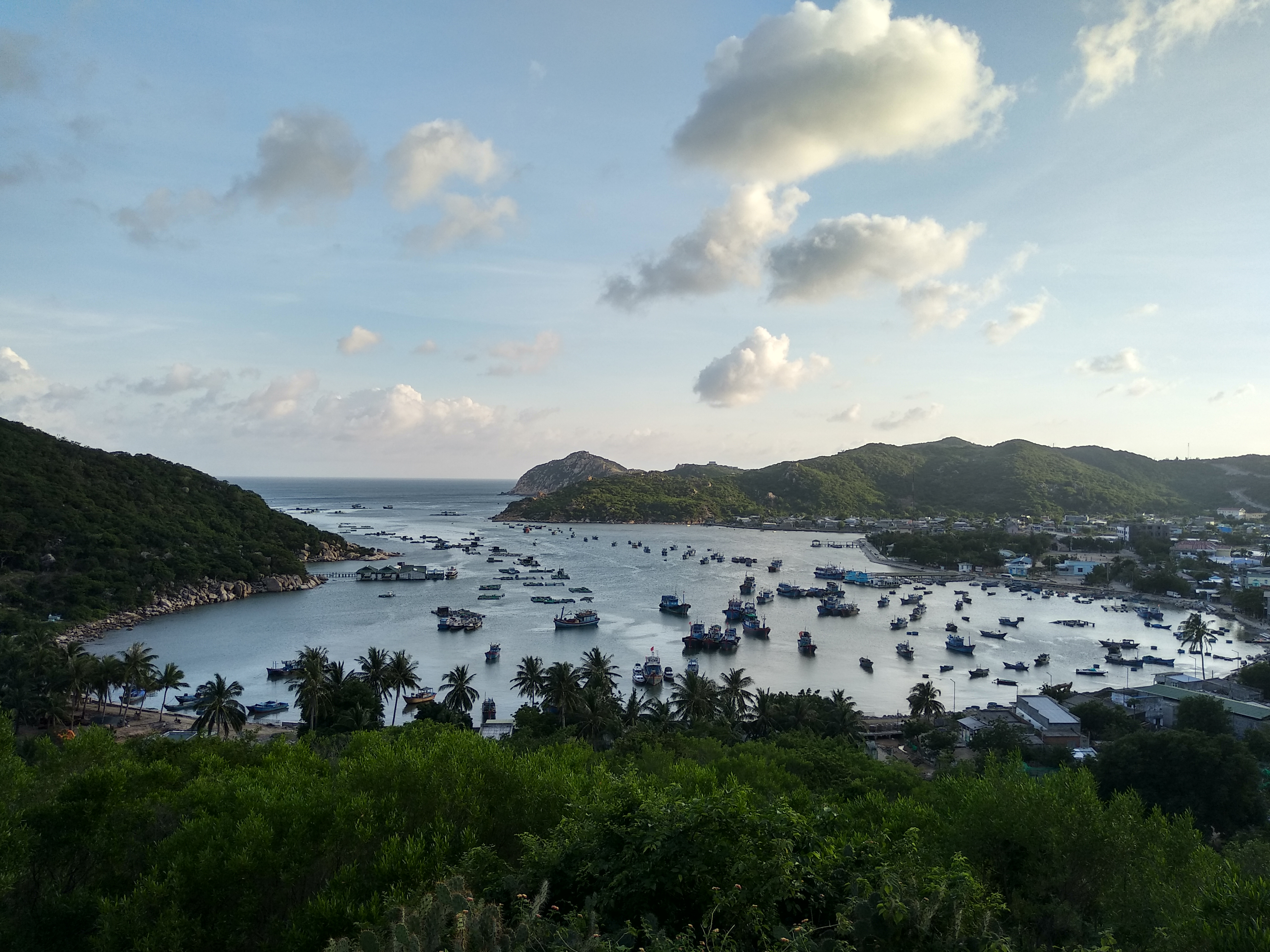
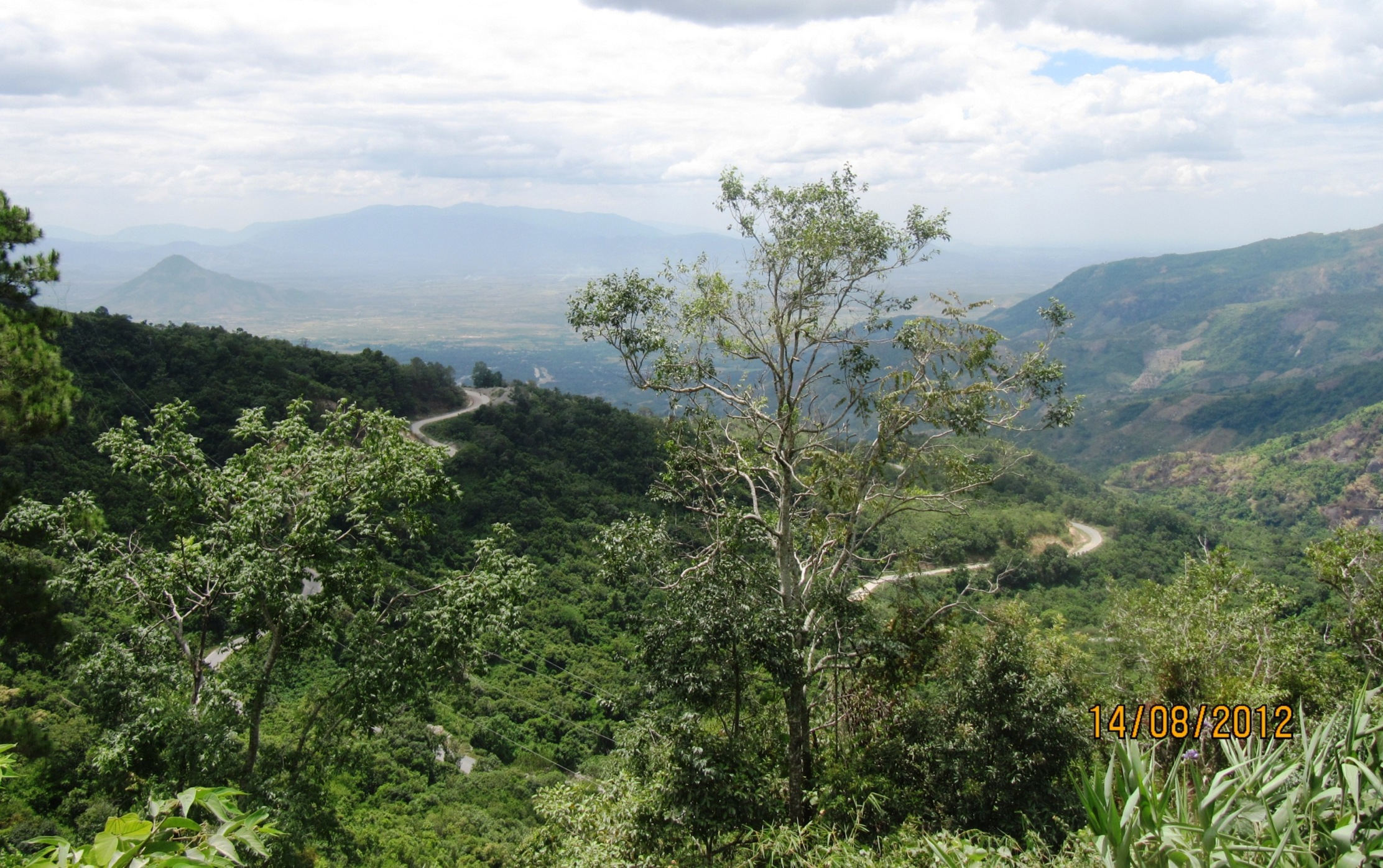
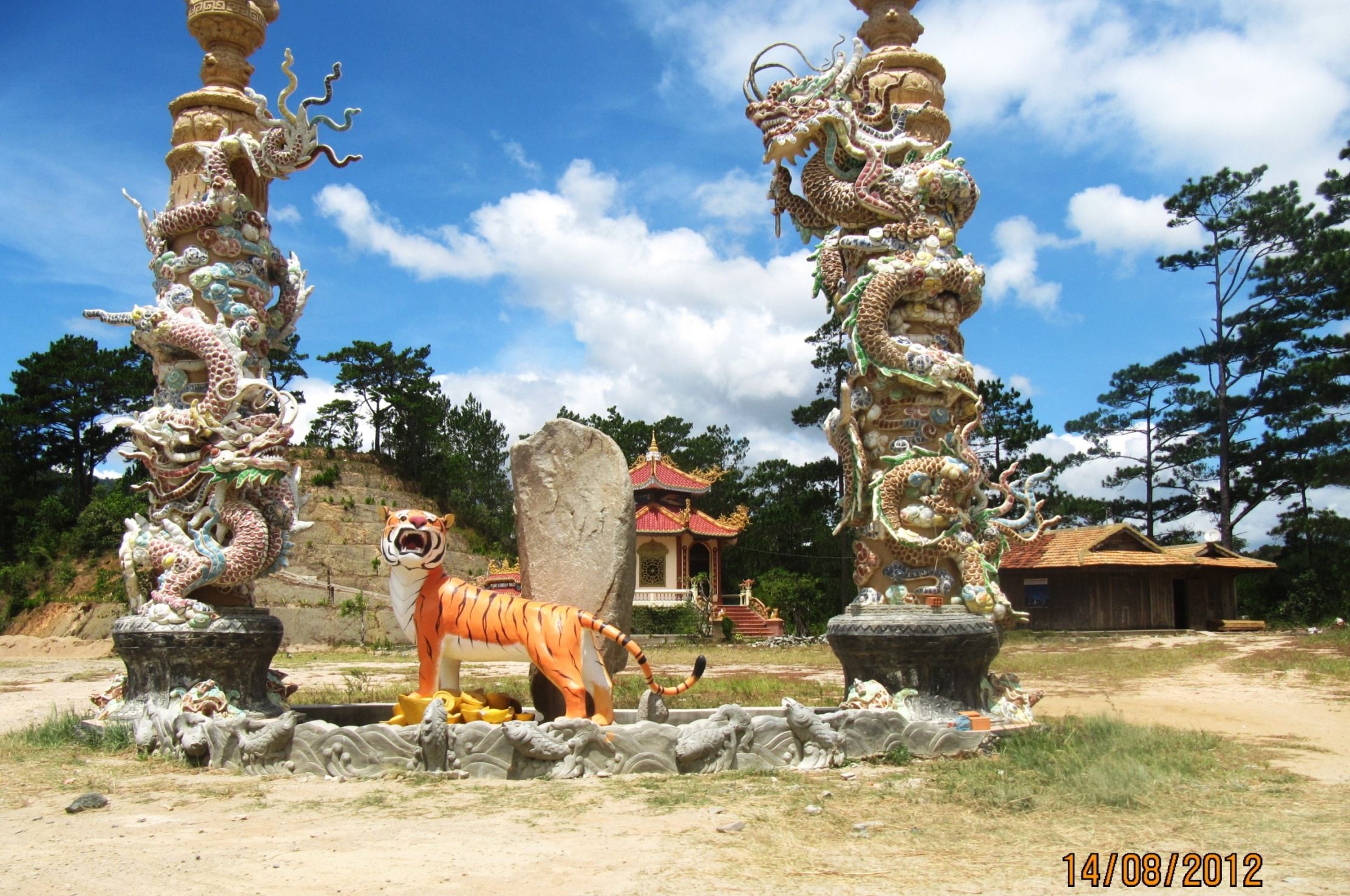
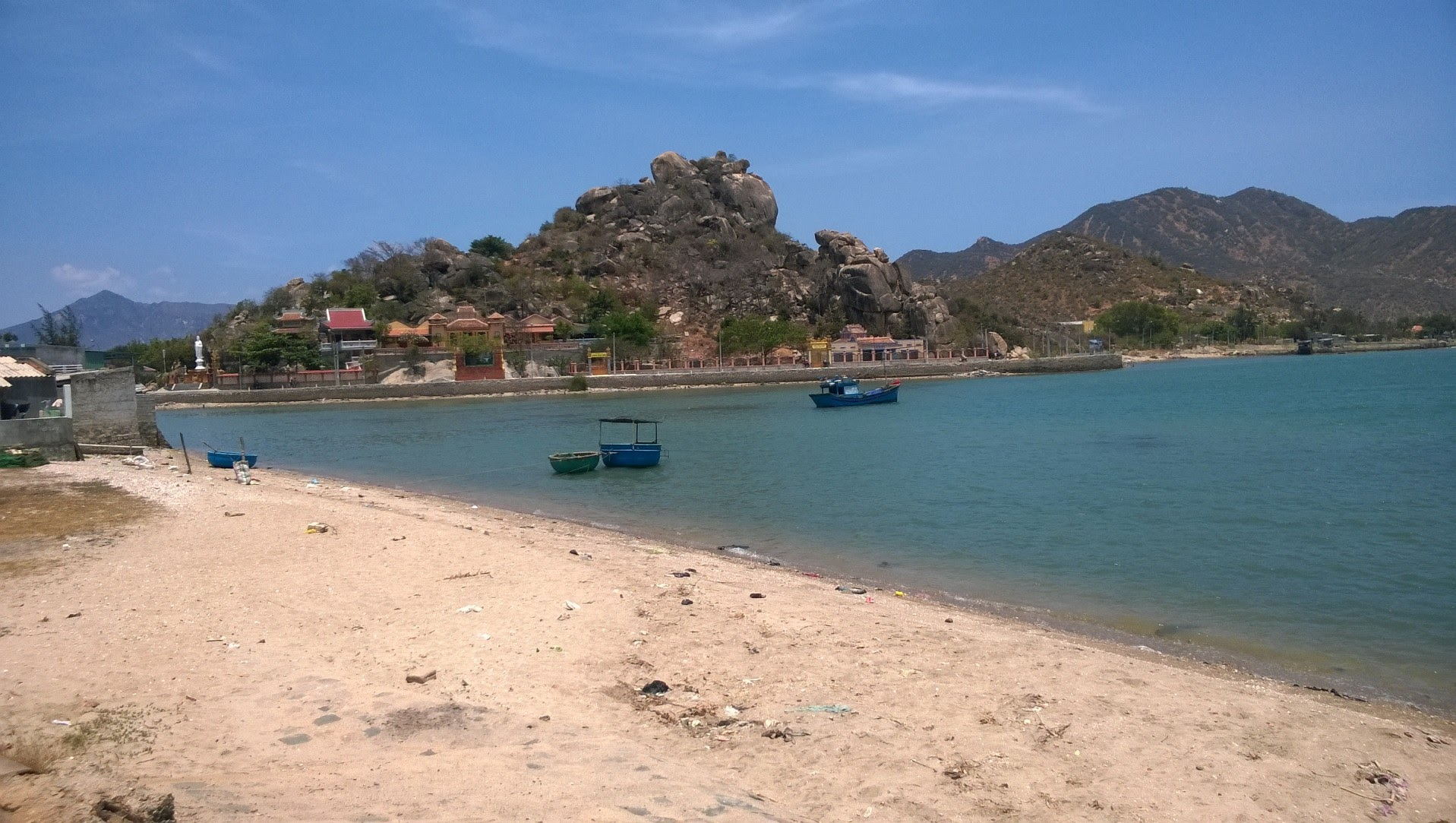
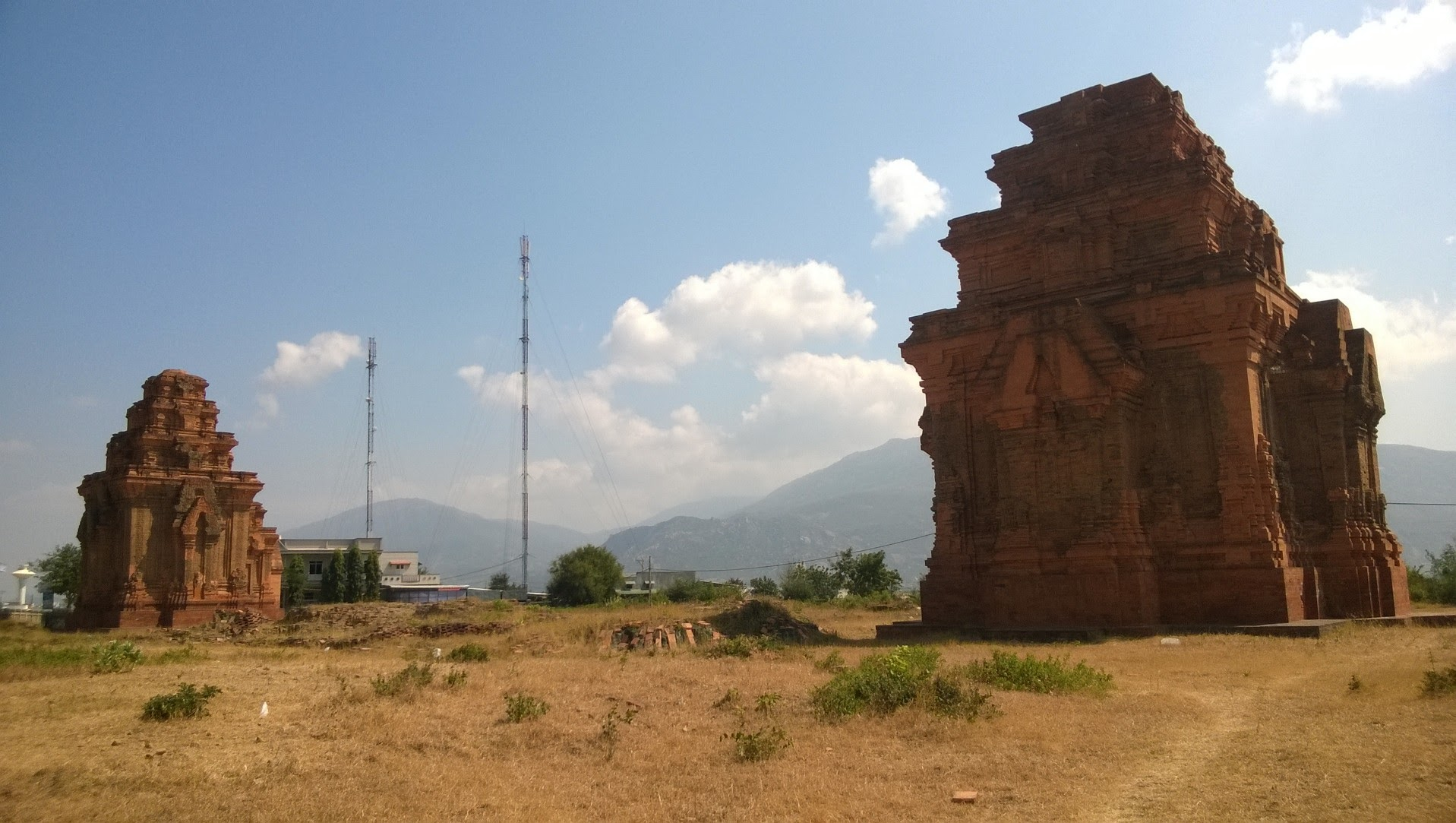
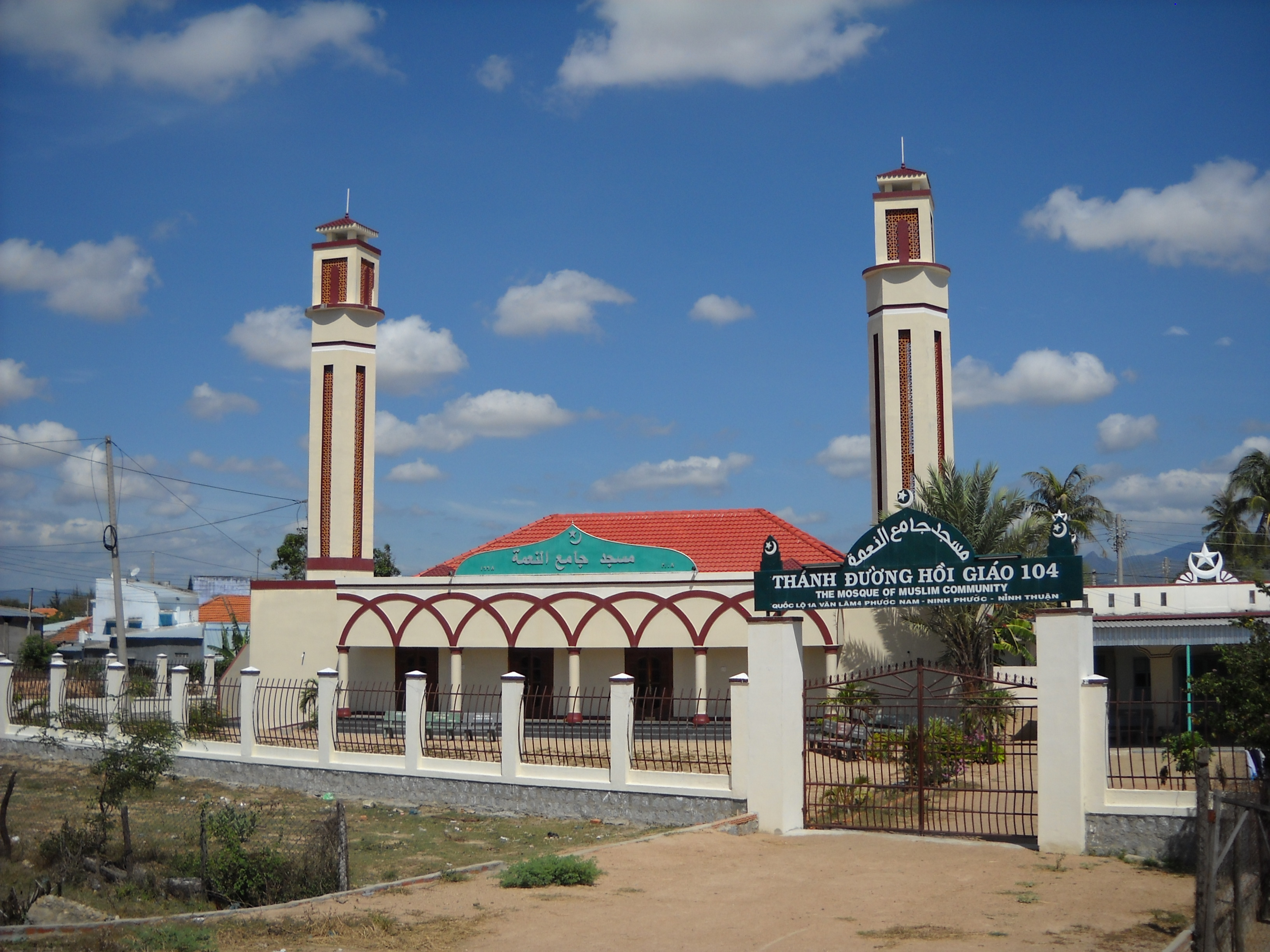
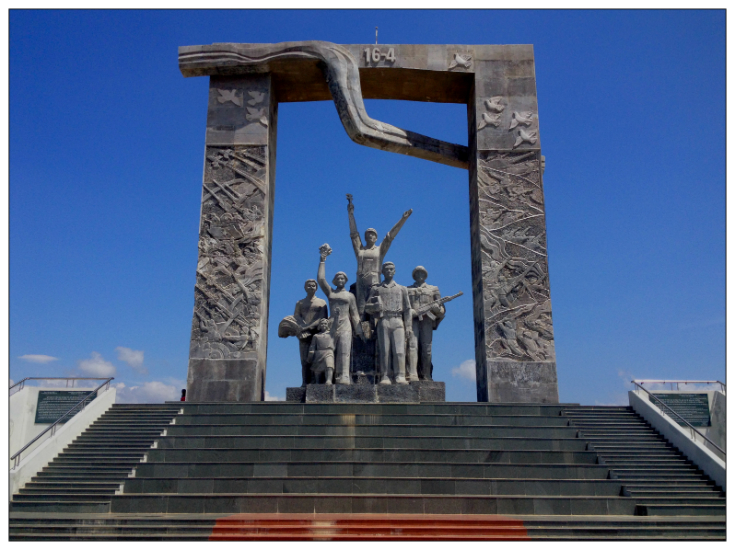
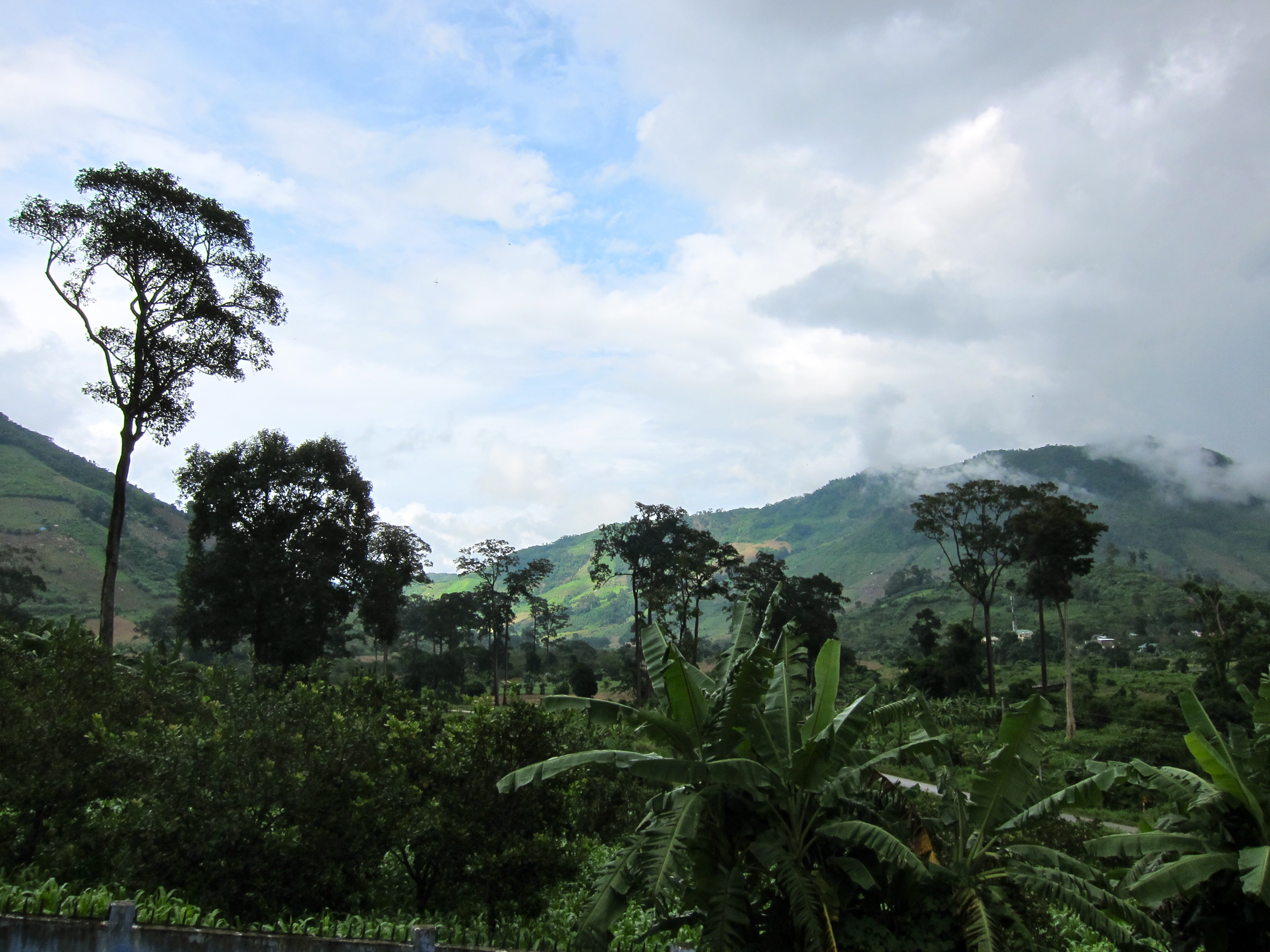
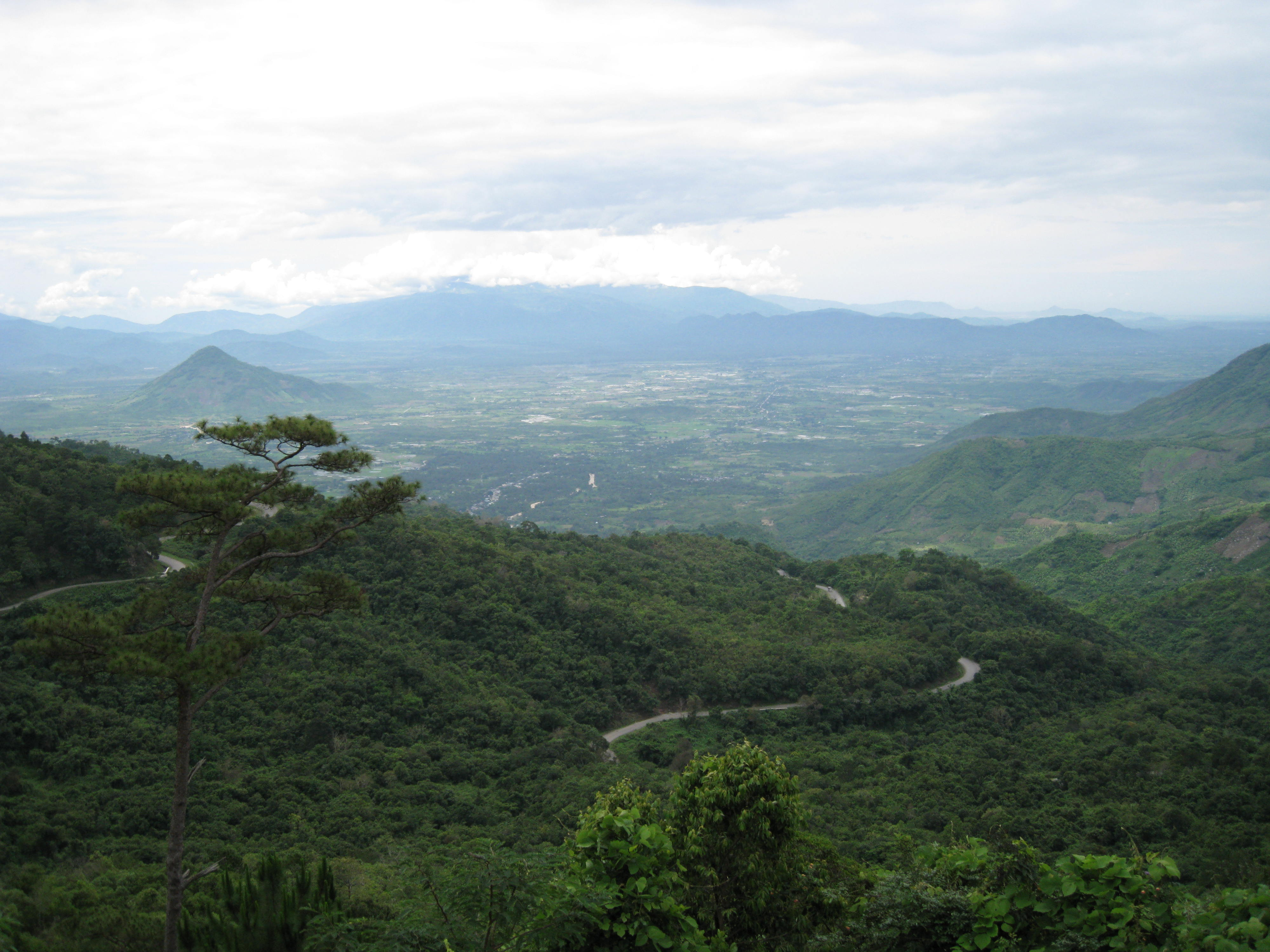
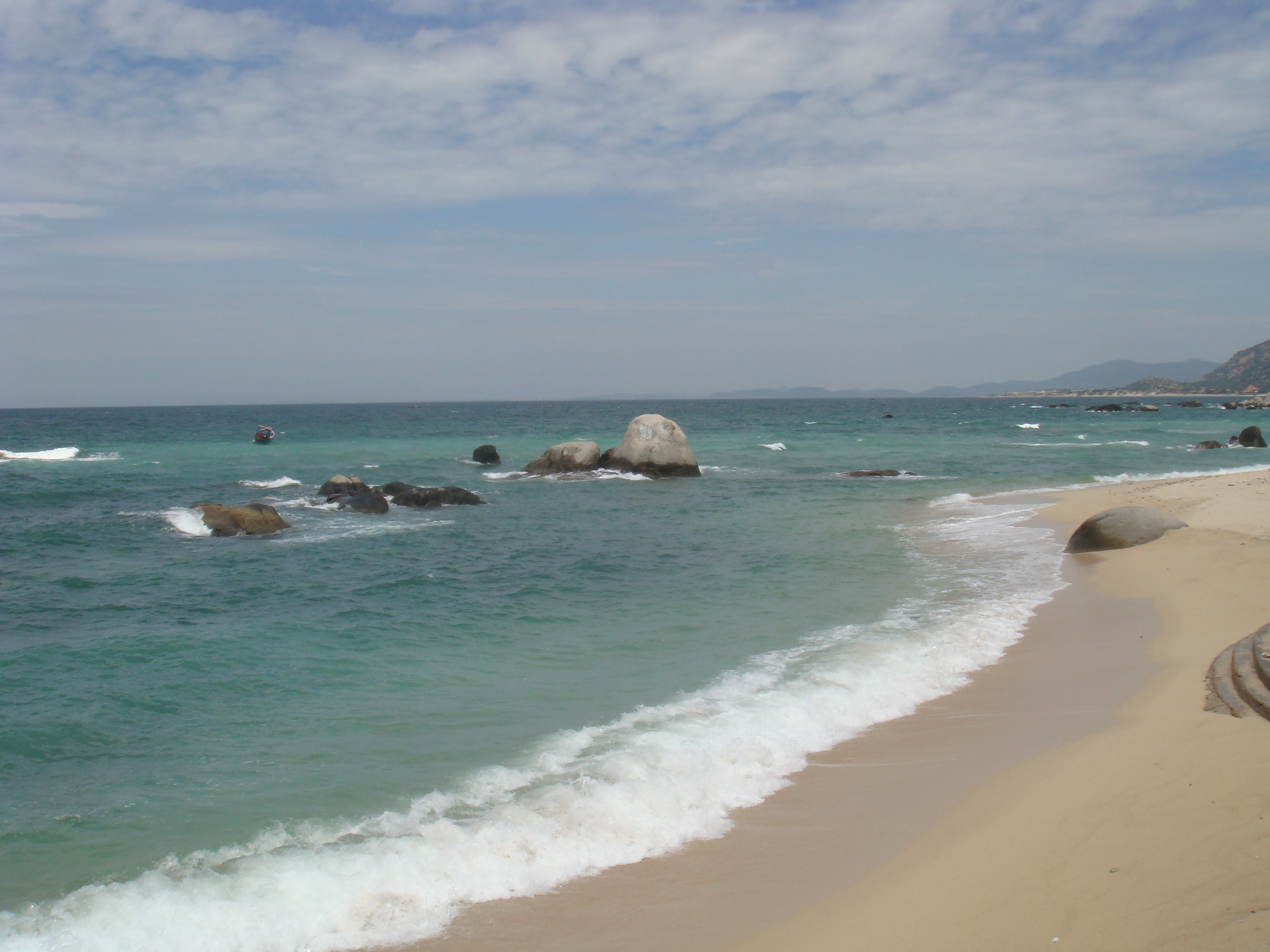
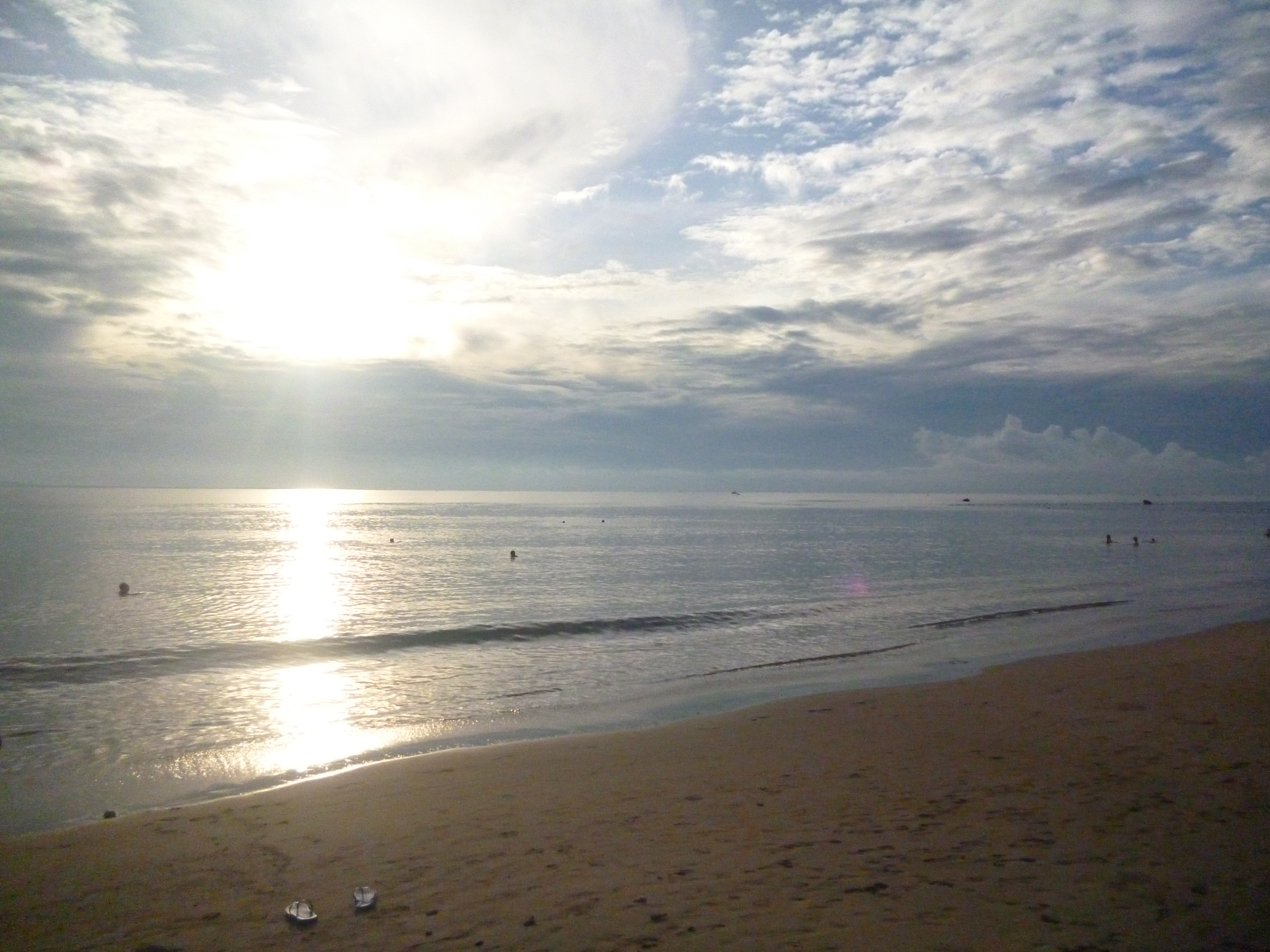
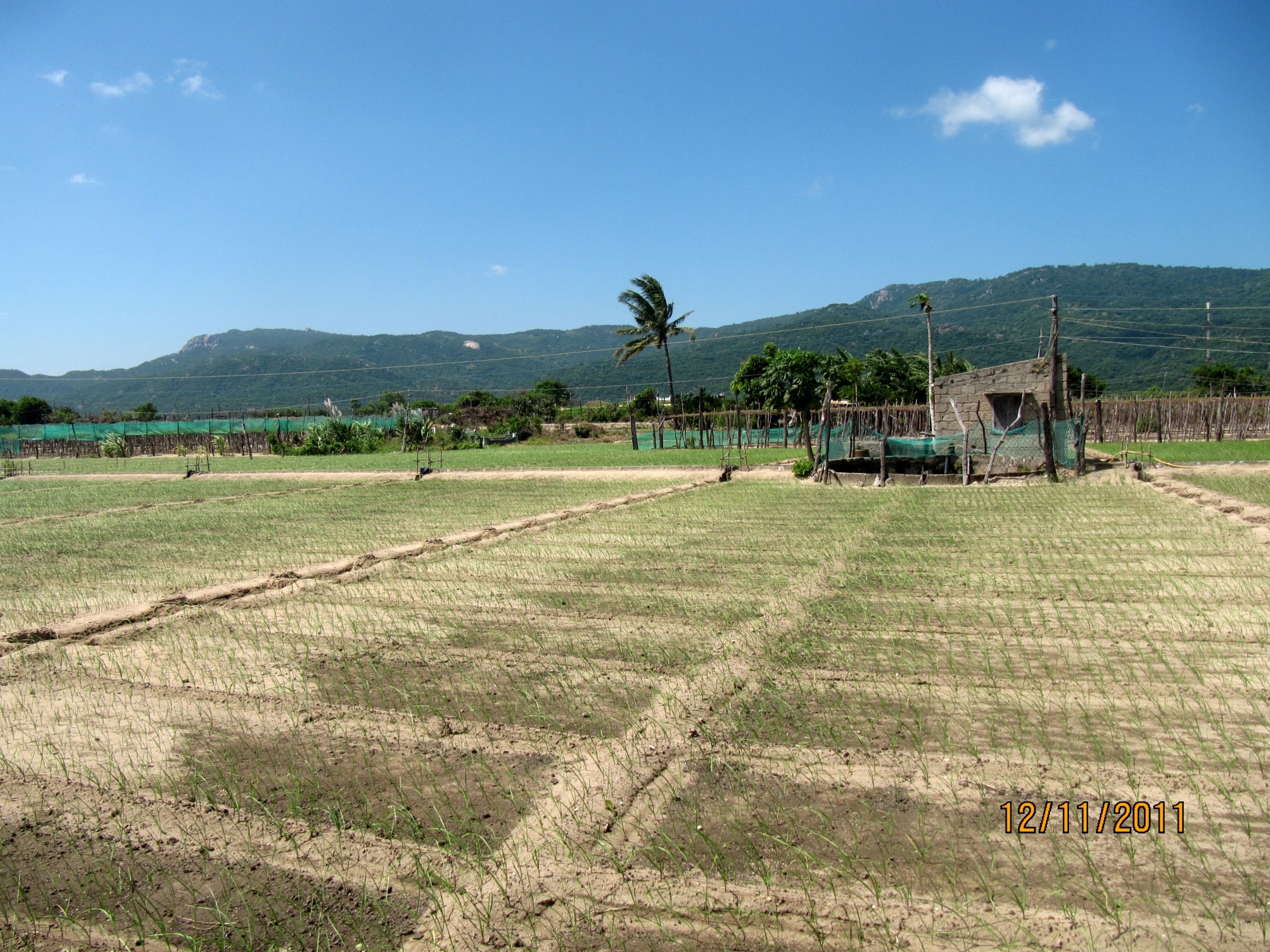
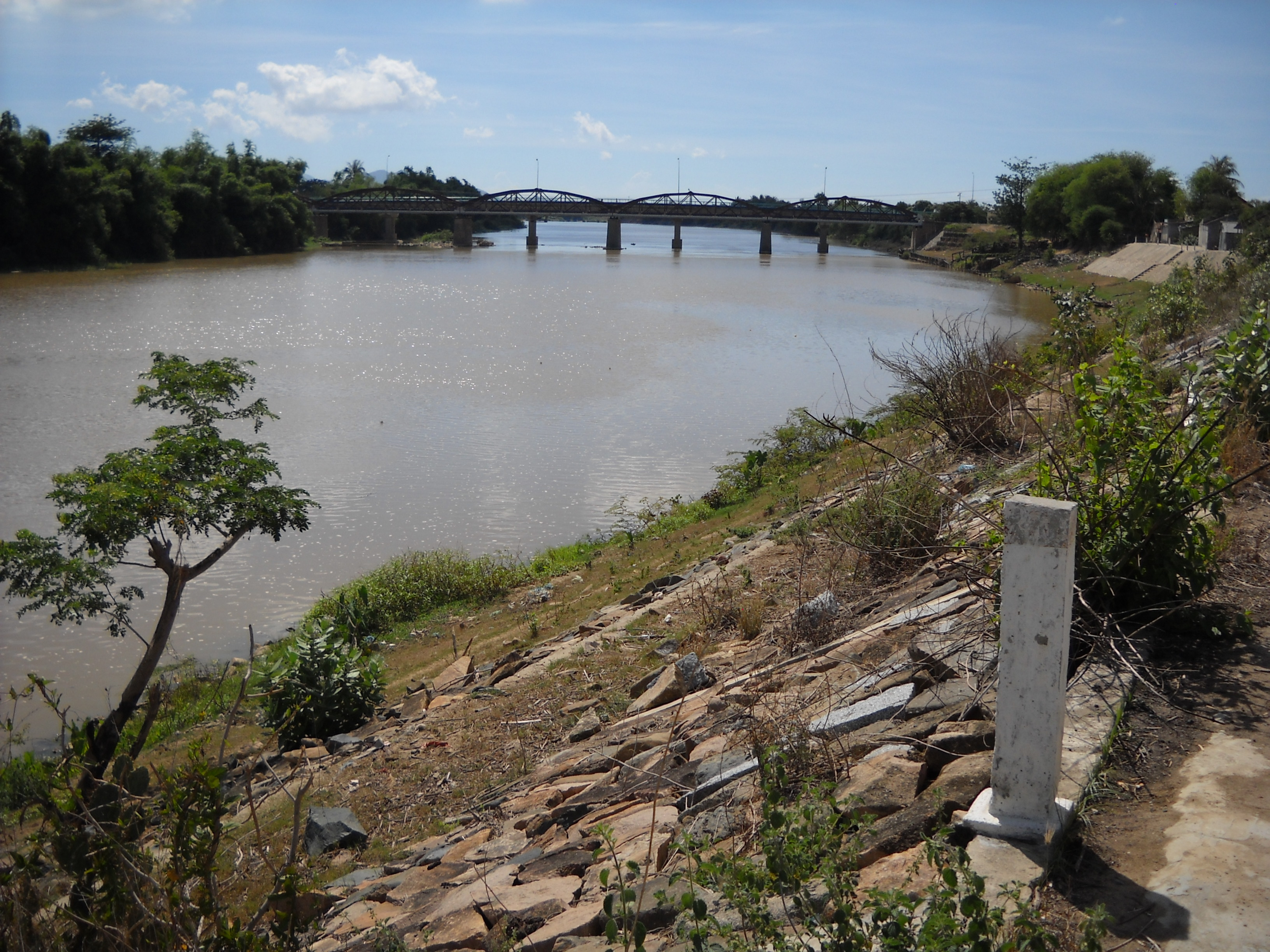
- In clockwise direction: Po Klong Garai Temple • Salt evaporation pond in Phan Rang • Hòa Lai Temple • Po Rome Temple • Vĩnh Hy Bay • View of Sông Pha Pass • Ba Tháp Temple • Đầm Nại Beach • Ninh Phước Cathedral • 16 April Park Monument • View of Phước Bình Pass • View of Ngoạn Mục Pass • Cà Ná Beach • Ninh Chữ Beach • Field in Vĩnh Hải • Dinh River

- Seal
- Nickname(s): Serenity/Peace; Land of Grapes
- Location of Ninh Thuận within Vietnam
- Coordinates: 11°45′N 108°50′E
- Country: Vietnam
- Region: South Central Coast
- Establishment of Phan Rang Province: 1901
- Re-establish Ninh Thuận province from Thuận Hải province: 1992
- Capital: Phan Rang–Tháp Chàm

Government
  - People's Council Chair: Phạm Vàn Hậu
  - People's Committee Chair: Trần Quốc Nam

Area
  - Total: 3,355.75 km^{2} (1,295.66 sq mi)

Population (2025)
  - Total: 765,843
  - Density: 228.218/km^{2} (591.082/sq mi)

Demographics
  - Ethnicities: Kinh, Chăm, Ra Glai, Cơ Ho, Hoa

GDP
  - Province: VND 24.288 trillion US$ 1.055 billion
- Time zone: UTC+7 (ICT)
- Calling code: +84259
- ISO 3166 code: VN-36
- HDI (2020): ▲0.683 (51th)
- Website: www.ninhthuan.gov.vn

Ninh Thuận, previously named Phan Rang, was a coastal province in the southernmost part of the South Central Coast region, the Central of Vietnam. It borders Khánh Hòa to the north, Bình Thuận to the south, Lâm Đồng to the west and the South China Sea to the east.

On June 12, 2025, Ninh Thuận was merged into Khánh Hòa province.

== History ==
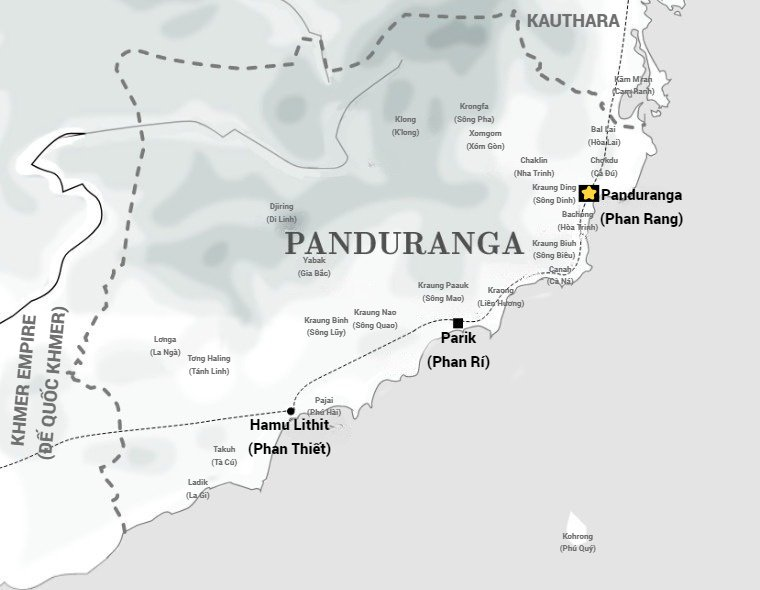
Map of Panduranga polity with its centre Phan Rang

The Cham principality of Panduranga had its center in Ninh Thuận province, but also included much of what is now Bình Thuận province. Panduranga became the political centre of Champa after the fall of Vijaya in 1471. It remained independent until 1832, when emperor Minh Mạng annexed it.

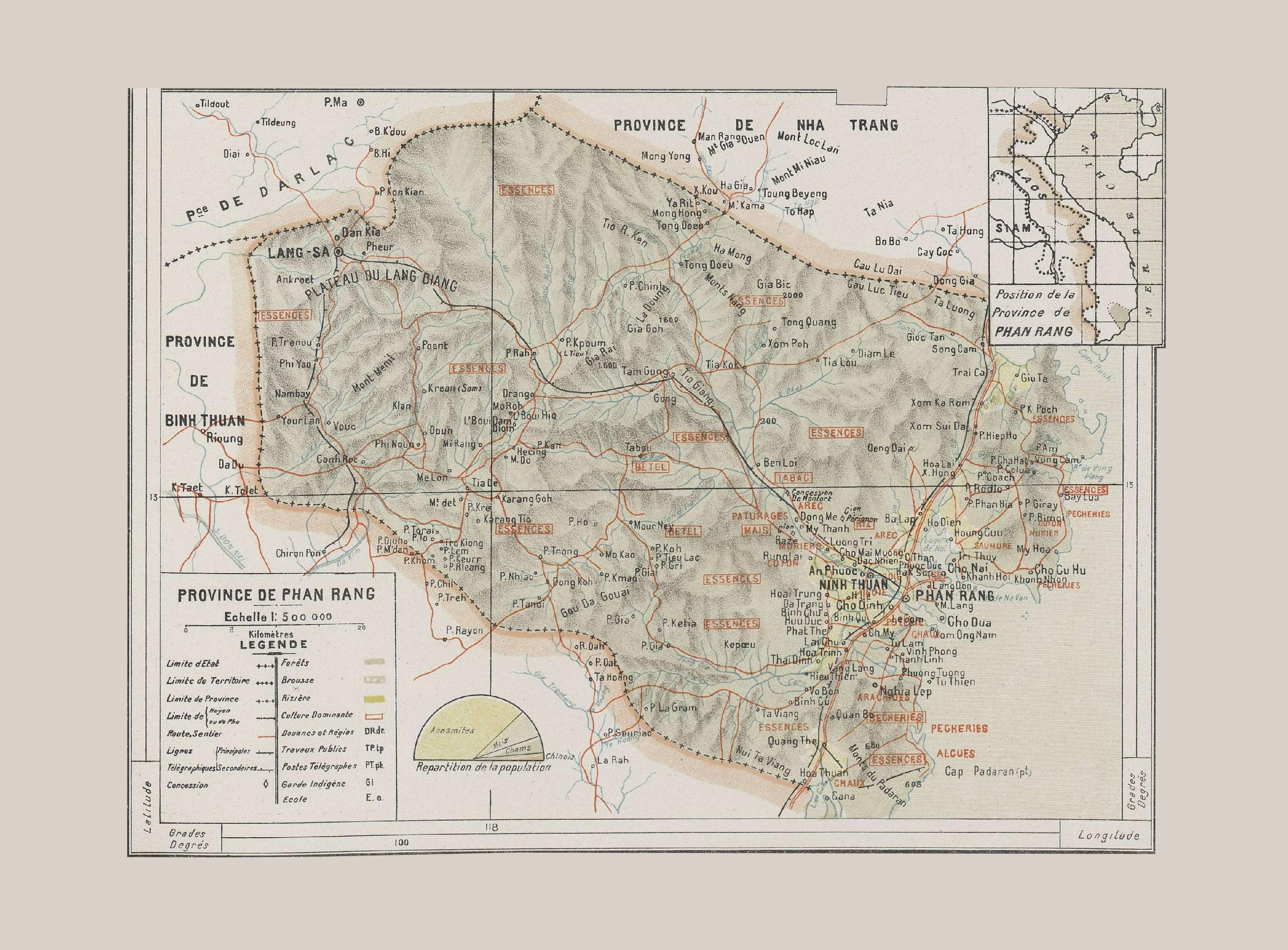
Phan Rang province in 1909, which was based on the former Panduranga.

In 1901, Phan Rang province was established and then renamed Ninh Thuận. Ninh Thuận province was merged into Bình Thuận province in 1976, together with Bình Tuy province, Ninh Thuận became a separate province again in 1991.

== Geography ==
Ninh Thuận's topography is typical for the South Central Coast in that high mountains are located not only near the western border to the Central Highlands, but also near the coast, the highest of which is Chúa mountain (Vietnamese: Núi Chúa) at 1,040 metres (3,410 ft) in the north east of the province. Several other peaks with heights up to 643 metres (2,110 ft), including Đá Bạc mountain (Vietnamese: Núi Đá Bạc) in the south, are located along the coast. The highest mountains are located at the borders to Khánh Hòa province and Lâm Đồng province, with three mountains of over 1,600 metres (5,200 ft) and the highest at 1,652 metres (5,420 ft), Sương Mù mountain (Vietnamese: Núi Sương Mù). Only a small part of the province around Phan Rang has elevations of under 50 metres (160 ft). The province's major river is the Dinh River, which flows through the main lowland of the province as well as Phan Rang. It has several tributaries in the province and is connected to Don Duong Lake in Lâm Đồng province.

As of 2007, 55.7 per cent of Ninh Thuận's area was covered by forests, making it the most forested province of the South Central Coast. Forests cover most of Ninh Hải District at the coast in the north east, and most of the north and south west of the province. Ninh Thuận is Vietnam's most arid province, with some areas in the province receiving less than 800 millimetres (31 in) of rain per year. There are reserves of molybdenum in the north of the province.

== Demography ==
Ninh Thuận had a population of 565,700 in 2009. Its urban population was 185,700 or 32.3% in 2007, a rapid increase from the 123,700 seven years ago. The urban population grew by an average 6% from 2000 to 2007, while the rural population actually had slightly negative growth. Overall population growth averaged 1.5%, which is the second highest in the South Central Coast after Da Nang.

Apart from the Kinh, significant parts of the province's population belong to the Cham and Raglai ethnic groups. Many of the Cham live near the capital Phan Rang (Panduranga). The Raglai live in more remote parts of the province, such as the Ninh Hải District in the north-east and the mountainous regions in the west.

As of April 1, 2009, the province has 10 observed religions, with a total of 184,577 followers. In particular, there are 65,790 Catholics, followed by Buddhism with 43,192 people, Hindus 40,695 (the highest proportion in the country), Muslims 25,513, Protestants 7,570, and other minor religions. There are 1,784 people following Cao Dai, 26 people following Bahá'í, 5 people in Hoa Hao Buddhism and the Pure Land Buddhist Association in Vietnam had one follower.

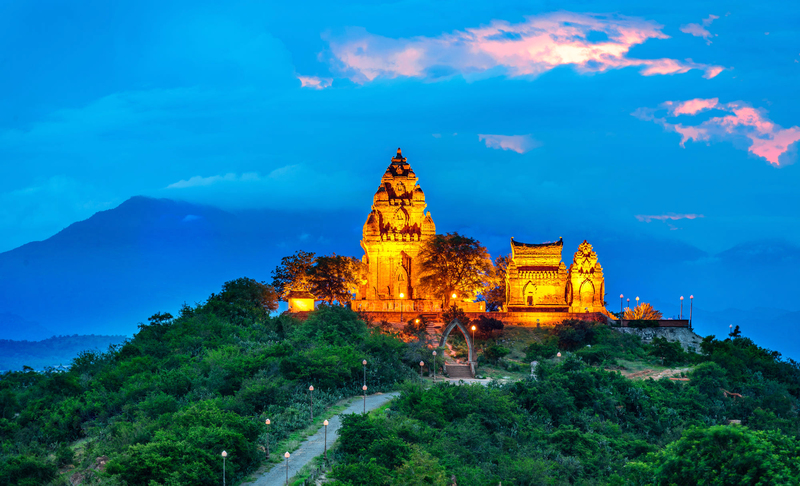
Temples of Po Klong Garai, near Phan Rang; one of the best preserved shrines of the Cham, originally dedicated to the god Shiva.

=== Ethnic groups ===
Major ethnic groups in the province include the Kinh, with 446,255 people, the Cham, with 67,517 people, and the Raglay, with 70,366 people.

== Administrative divisions ==
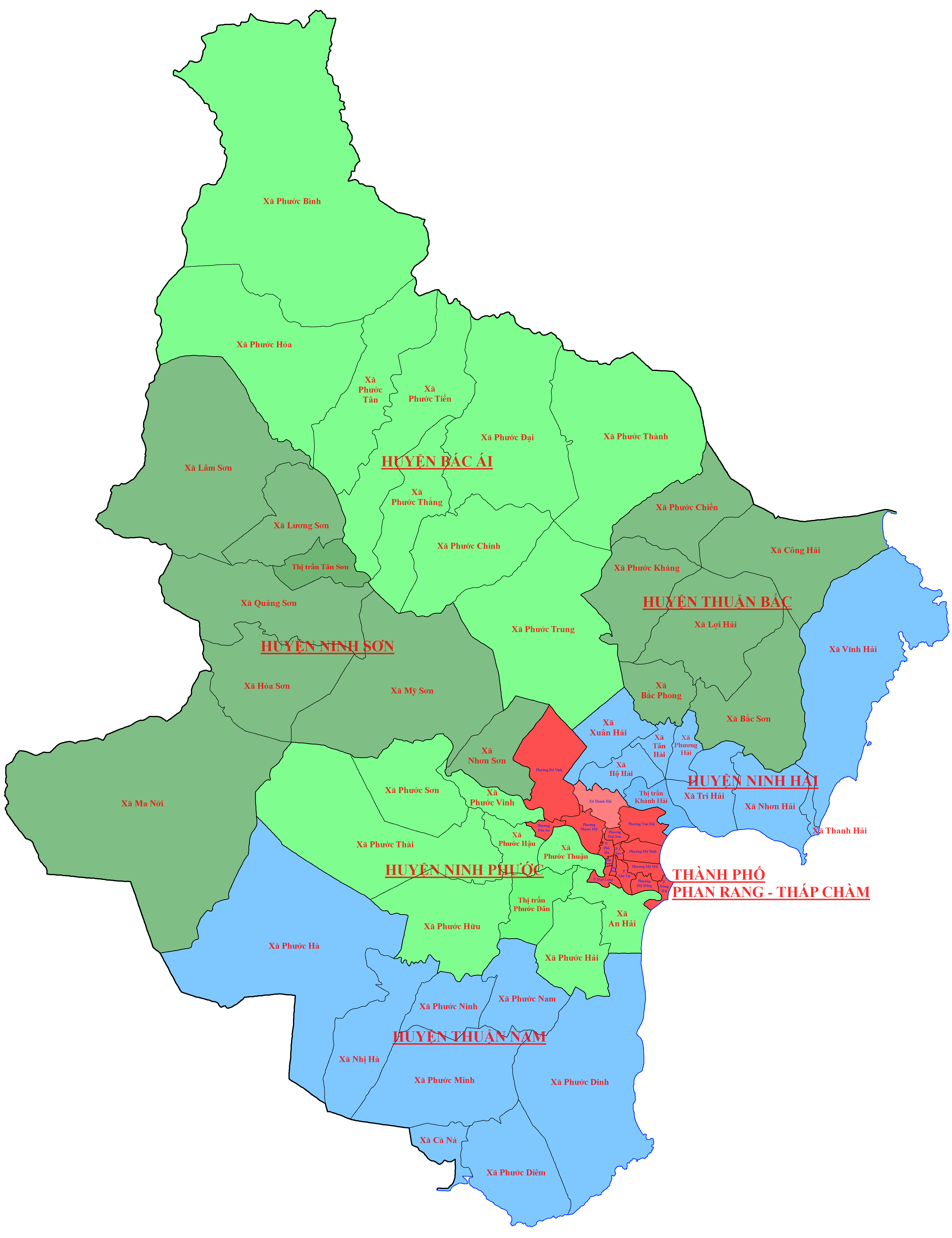
Administrative map of Ninh Thuan province

Ninh Thuận is subdivided into 7 district-level sub-divisions:

6 districts:

- Bác Ái
- Ninh Hải
- Ninh Phước
- Ninh Sơn
- Thuận Bắc
- Thuận Nam

1 provincial city:

- Phan Rang–Tháp Chàm (capital)

They are further subdivided into 3 commune-level towns (or townlets), 47 communes, and 15 wards.

=== Cham villages ===
Cham names for Cham villages in Ninh Thuận province were as follows (Sakaya 2014:755-756).

- Thuận Nam District
  - Ram Văn Lâm
  - Aia Li-u: Phước Lập
  - Aia Binguk: Nghĩa Lập (Chăm Jat)
  - Pabhan: Vụ Bổn
  - Palaw: Hiếu Thiện
- Ninh Phước District
  - Hamu Craok: Bầu Trúc
  - Caklaing: Mỹ Nghiệp
  - Bal Caong: Chung Mỹ
  - Hamu Tanran: Hữu Đức
  - Thuen: Hậu Sanh
  - Mblang Kathaih: Phất Thế
  - Padra: Như Ngọc
  - Cakhaok: Bình Chữ
  - Boah Bini: Hoài Trung
  - Boah Dana: Chất Thường
  - Caok: Hiếu Lễ
  - Mblang Kacak: Phước Đồng
  - Baoh Deng: Phú Nhuận
  - Katuh: Tuấn Tú
  - Cuah Patih: Thành Tín
- Ninh Sơn District
  - Cang: Lương Tri
- Phan Rang–Tháp Chàm
  - Tabeng: Thành Ý
- Ninh Hải District
  - Pamblap Klak: An Nhơn
  - Pamblap Birau: Phước Nhơn
- Thuận Bắc District
  - Bal Riya: Bỉnh Nghĩa

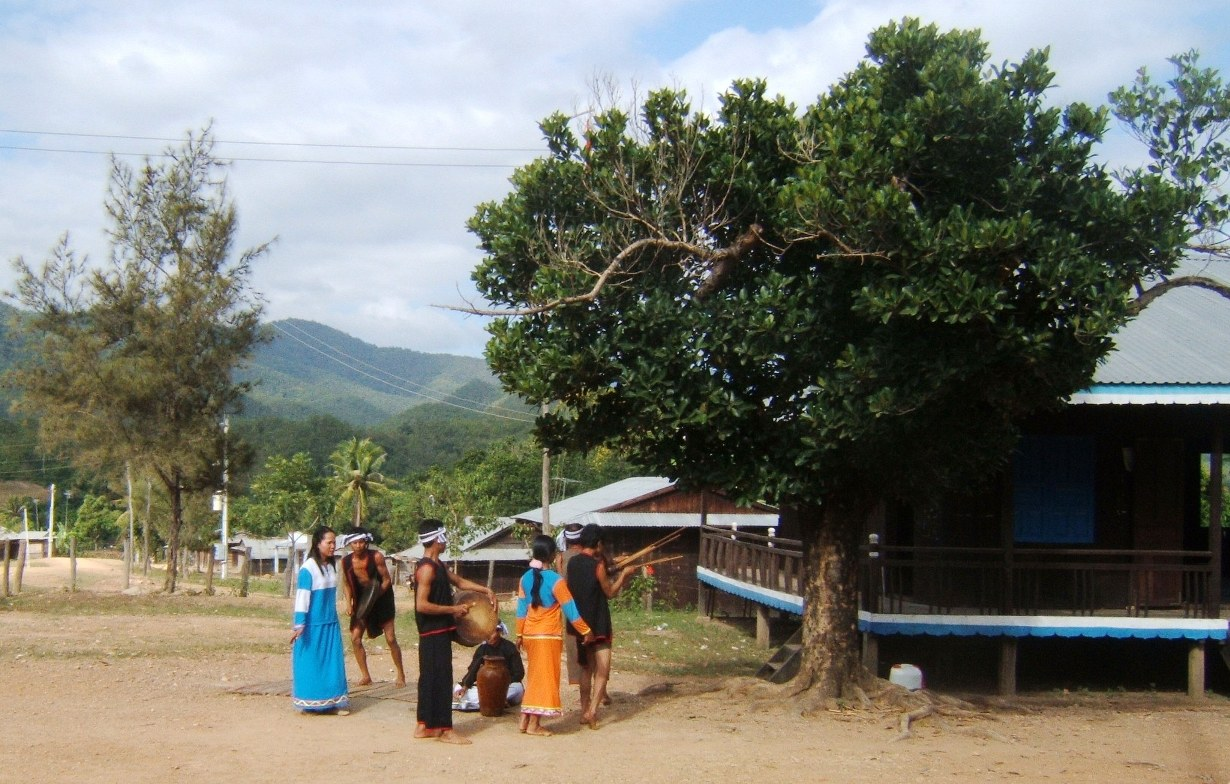
Raglai Dance in MaNoi commune, Ninh Thuan province.

== Economy ==
Ninh Thuận is southern Vietnam's poorest and least industrialized province. Nominal per capita GDP was 6.66 million VND in 2007, half of the national average and 56% of the South Central Coast's average of 10.8 million VND. Ninh Thuận has also been the only province in the South Central Coast with an average annual GDP growth rate of less than 10% from 2000 to 2007 - at 9.4% compared to the region's average of 11.2%. While its industrial growth has been slightly above the region's average at 16.4%, it started from a very low base and therefore contributed little to overall growth. Growth in services has been at 9.8%, significantly below the region's average, while agriculture, forestry and fishing have grown at an average rate of 6.7%, somewhat higher than the average.

=== Agriculture, forestry, fishing ===
Ninh Thuận's agriculture is mostly based on rice. 33,400 ha out of a total of 70,000 ha were used for the cultivation of rice, followed by maize with 14,200 ha. 173,200 t of rice and 36,300 t of maize were harvested in 2007, accounting for 0.5% and 0.9% of national output. The most important cash crop is tobacco. It is grown on 1,300 ha (as of 2007) in the central part of the province west and north-east of Phan Rang with an output of 3,300 t, or 10.3% of Vietnam's total output. The province also harvested 200 t in 2007, 1.2% of the national total. Other less significant crops include cashew nuts, sugar-cane, peanuts, and coconuts.

Despite the large forests of the province, there is little commercial use of forest resources. Gross output of the forestry sector was 23.7 billion VND, accounting for only 1.8% of the South Central Coast, and therefore even less than Da Nang. Much of the province's forests are protected as part of Núi Chúa National Park and Phước Bình National Park. These National Parks as well as the nearby Vịnh Vĩnh Hy attracted the building of Amanoi, a five star franchise hotel belonging to Aman Resorts.

Ninh Thuận's fishing gross output was 1138.8 billion VND in 2007, 1.3% of Vietnam's output and therefore more significant in a national context than agriculture. It has grown at an average of 11.7%, far exceeding agricultural growth and making it one of the fastest growing sectors of the economy. As of 2007, there were 589 offshore fishing vessels registered in the province.

=== Industry ===
Ninh Thuận has a very small industrial sector, with a gross output accounting for only 2% of the South Central Coast's total. Industry contributes 1.3 million VND to the GDP per capita, compared to an average of 4.4 million VND for the region.

The province's industrial products are mostly basic processed food and seafood products (frozen aquatic products, fish sauce, shelled cashew nuts) and processed raw materials (stones, bricks, salt). However, the industrial sector's growth of 16.4% has enabled it to absorb much of Ninh Thuận's labor force growth by increasing industrial employment from 14,900 in 2000 to 43,700 in 2007 - although this employment growth has been overshadowed by the service sector, which created 57,300 additional jobs in the same period despite its slower growth.

== Infrastructure ==
=== Transport ===
Ninh Thuận is located along Vietnam's main north-south corridors; therefore National Route 1, North–South Expressway East as well as North–South Railway run through the province. Ninh Thuận's main railway station is at Tháp Chàm. There are also two smaller railway station: Bà Râu in Thuận Bắc District in the north and Cà Ná near the southern border. Phan Rang is connected to Da Lat by National Road 27 via Ngoan Muc Pass. There used to be a railway serving the same route, but it has not been in use since the start of the Vietnam War.

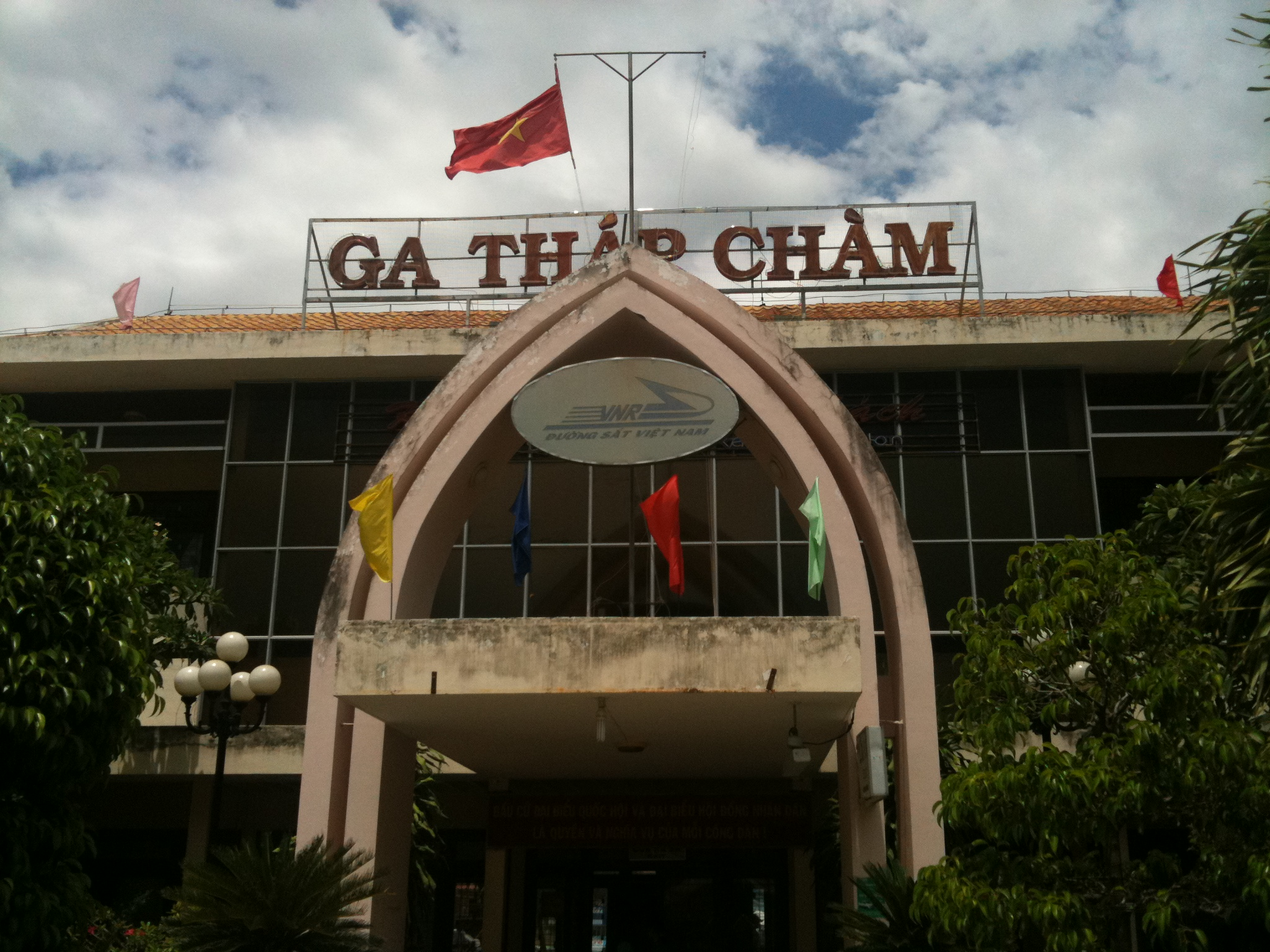
Tháp Chàm railway station

Ninh Thuận has three ports:

- at Vịnh Vĩnh Hy in northeastern Ninh Hải District
- Ninh Chu Port in southern Ninh Hải District near Phan Rang
- Cà Ná Port in the south of the province

The nearest commercial airport is Cam Ranh International Airport.

=== Energy ===
Ninh Thuận aims to become a renewable energy production base starting in the late 2020s, taking advantage of the local climate with the lowest annual rainfall, highest total solar heat radiation and fastest average wind speed in Vietnam. However, it is located far from major load centers of Vietnam.

As of 2021, around 100 ha of photovoltaic panels were already deployed in the province, with several projects still under construction. Solar power capacity totaled 2,256 MW in 2021.

The province has had some trouble with creating a successful wind power project, notably delaying a project scheduled to be completed in 2012 for five years before seemingly scrapping the project entirely.

Da Nhim hydropower plant is located in Ninh Sơn District in the northwest of Ninh Thuận. Ninh Thuận was chosen as the site for some of Vietnam's future electricity projects that are part of Vietnam Electricity's diversification away from hydropower. The province was supposed to build two nuclear reactors starting in 2009, but the plan was scrapped due to "economic conditions". In 2026, Vietnam and Russia signed an agreement intending to improve nuclear capacity in the province. Then prime minister, Pham Minh Chinh, set a target in 2025 to create two nuclear reactors in Ninh Thuận by 2030.

== Tourism ==
Tourist attractions in Ninh Thuan: Núi Chúa National Park, areas of dry forest, coastal habitats, and marine ecosystems. Vĩnh Hy Bay is known for its coastal and coral reefs. Other attractions include Hang Rai, Nam Cuong Sand Dunes, and Mũi Dinh, which are located along the province's coastline and surrounding areas.

Ninh Thuan is also known for its grape-growing areas where several vineyards are open to visitors.

== Notable residents ==
- Po Klong Garai - king of Panduranga from 1167 to 1205.
- Nguyễn Văn Thiệu - former President of South Vietnam from 1967 to 1975.
- Chế Linh - Vietnamese (ethnic Cham) popular singer, songwriter.
- Po Dharma (Quảng Văn Đủ) - Vietnamese human rights activist and Cham cultural historian.
- Al Hoang (Hoàng Duy Hùng) - is a former member of the Houston City Council.
