= The Amazing Race Vietnam 2014 =

Season of television series

- Season 2014
- Presented by: Huy Khánh
- No. of teams: 9
- Winners: Hương Giang & Criss
- No. of legs: 11
- Distance traveled: 10,500 km (6,500 mi)
- No. of episodes: 22

Release
- Original network: VTV6
- Original release: 21 June – 31 August 2014

Additional information
- Filming dates: Early 2014

Series chronology
- ← Previous; Season 2 Next → Season 4

The Amazing Race Vietnam: Cuộc đua kỳ thú 2014 is the third season of The Amazing Race Vietnam, a Vietnamese reality competition show based on the American series The Amazing Race. It featured nine teams of two in a race around Vietnam for 300 million₫.

The program premiered on VTV6 and aired every Saturday and Sunday primetime (7:55 p.m. UTC+7) from 21 June to 31 August 2014. The host for this season is Huy Khánh.

Singer and Athlete Hương Giang and Criss were the winners of this season.

== Production ==
=== Development and filming ===
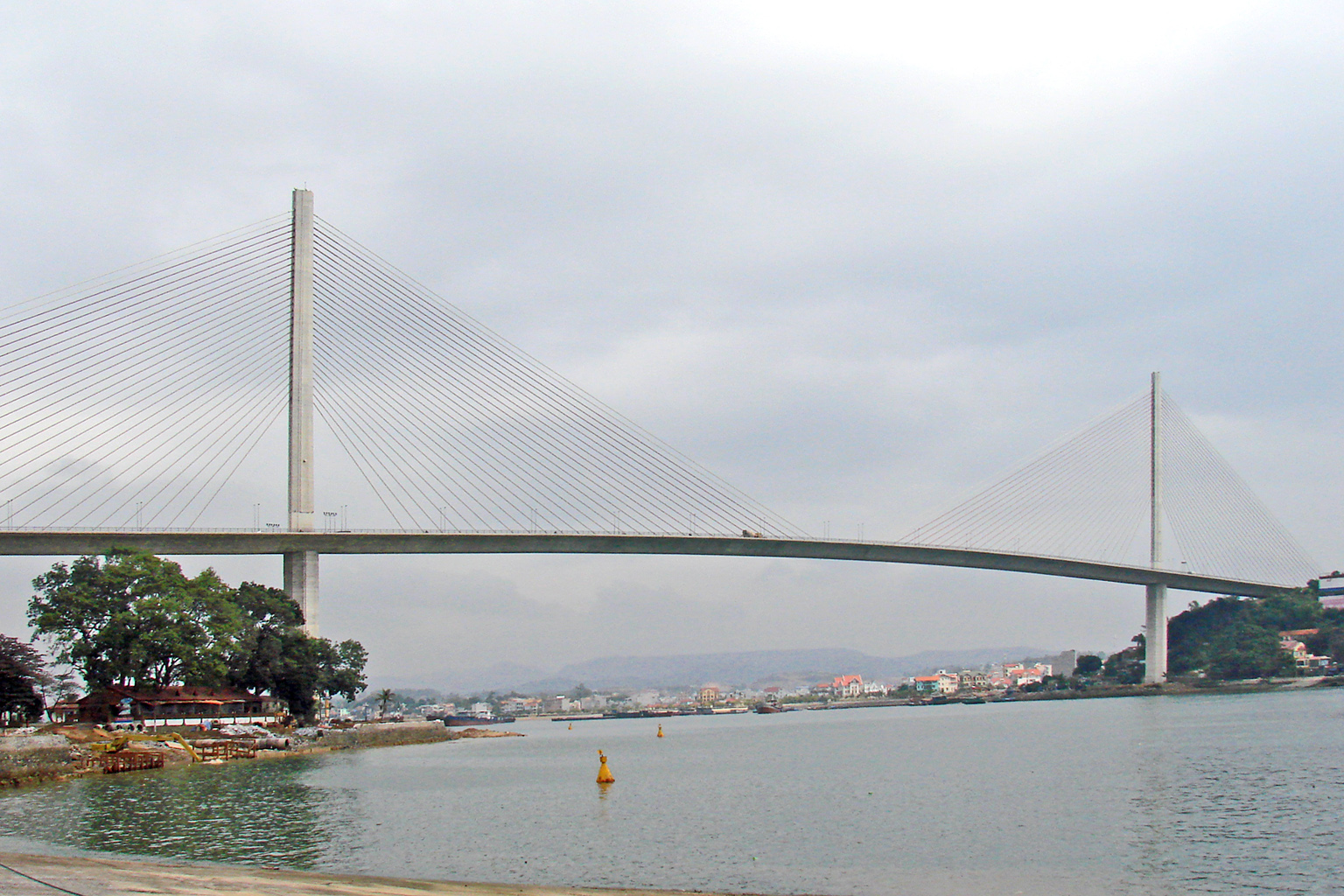
Teams began the third season of The Amazing Race Vietnam in Hạ Long with a rappel down the Bãi Cháy Bridge.

The season was filmed in early 2014.

Unique to this season, each leg aired with two-part episodes.

The final Detour featured musician Anh Bằng and Vietnam's Got Talent season 2 semifinalist Nguyễn Phương as judges.

=== Marketing ===
The show was sponsored by Sting Energy Drink.

== Cast ==
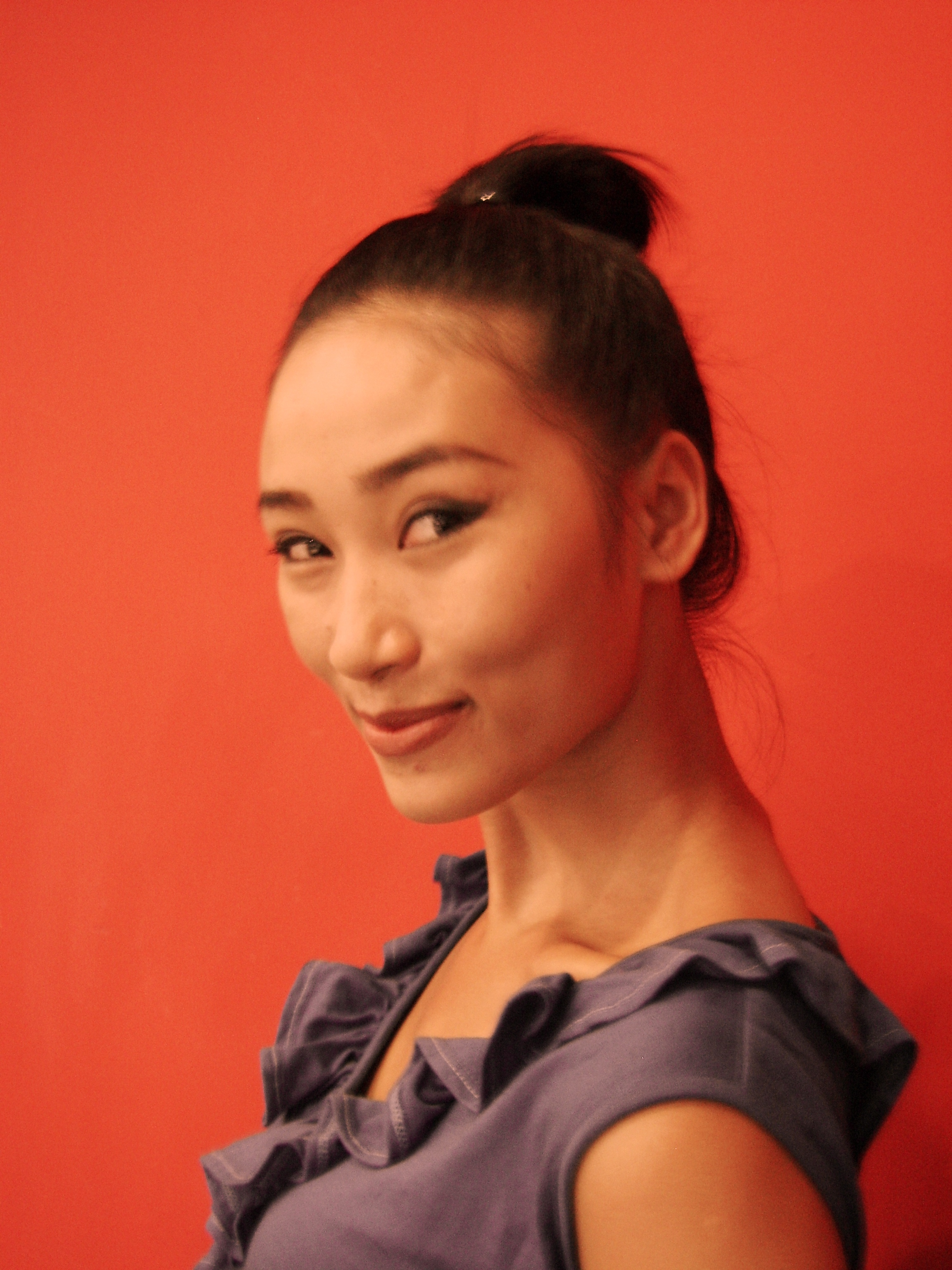
Trang Khiếu

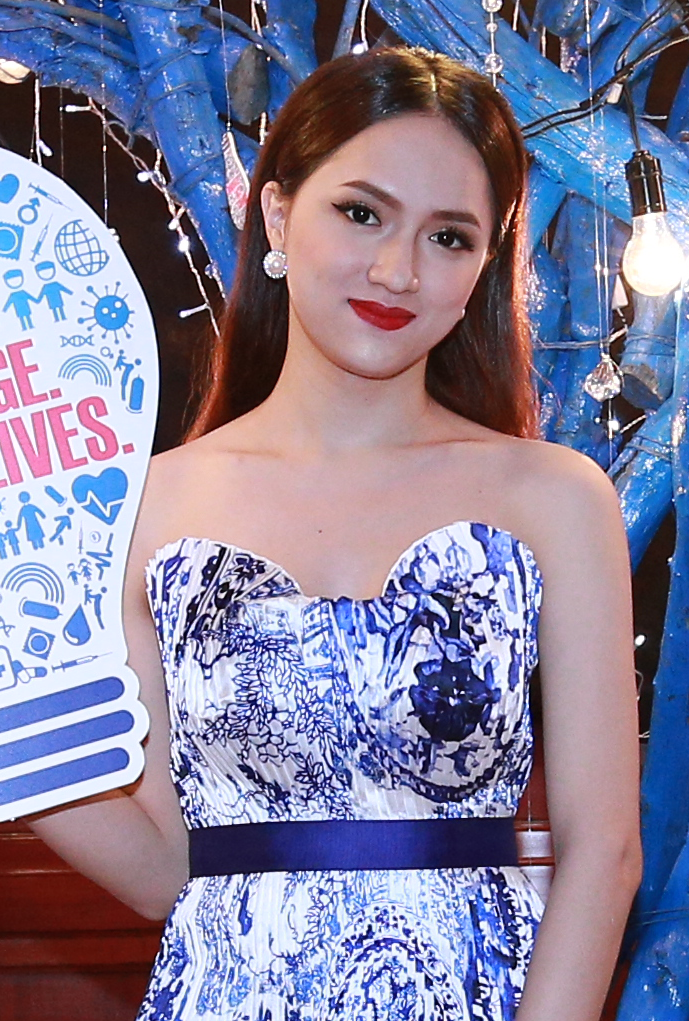
Hương Giang

This season was another celebrity edition, but this time featuring many celebrities who were chosen to race on the show as well as non-celebrities. The cast was announced in May.

Huê "Mint" Nguyễn died on 13 March 2021 at the age of 39 due to cancer.

Contestants	Age	Profession/ Relationship	Hometown	Status
Minh Long Nguyễn	26	Friends	Da Nang	Eliminated 1st (in Hanoi)
Sơn Việt Hoàng	29	Friends	Hanoi	Eliminated 1st (in Hanoi)
"Miko" Lan Trinh Võ Ngọc	27	Singer	Ho Chi Minh City	Eliminated 2nd (in Dien Bien Phu, Dien Bien)
Hoàng Nam Lê	29	MC	Hanoi	Eliminated 2nd (in Dien Bien Phu, Dien Bien)
Kim Thanh Trần	26	Siblings in Spirit	Đồng Nai	Eliminated 3rd (in Huế, Thừa Thiên Huế)
Khải Anh Đinh	24	Siblings in Spirit	Hanoi	Eliminated 3rd (in Huế, Thừa Thiên Huế)
Nguyễn Long Điền	30	Actor	Ho Chi Minh City	Eliminated 4th (in Ninh Phước, Ninh Thuận)
Nguyễn Kim Dung	26	Actor	Biên Hòa, Đồng Nai	Eliminated 4th (in Ninh Phước, Ninh Thuận)
Sơn Ngọc Minh	24	Singer	Cần Thơ	Eliminated 5th (in Sa Đéc, Đồng Tháp)
Huê "Mint" Nguyễn	32	Sports Coach	Ho Chi Minh City	Eliminated 5th (in Sa Đéc, Đồng Tháp)
"Kiwi" Ngô Thị Mai Trang	32	Married	Nam Định, Nam Định	Eliminated 6th (in Incheon, South Korea)
Đỗ Hoàng Dương	39	Married	Ho Chi Minh City	Eliminated 6th (in Incheon, South Korea)
Huyền Trang Khiếu Thị	23	Model	Bắc Giang, Bắc Giang	Third Place
Yahya An Đinh	25	Designer	Vancouver, Canada	Third Place
Trang Trần	29	Model	Hanoi	Second Place
Hiếu Nguyễn	24	Actor	Thái Bình, Thái Bình	Second Place
Ngọc Hiếu "Hương Giang" Nguyễn	23	Singer	Hanoi	Winners
Huy Phương "Criss" Lai	32	Athlete	Long An	Winners

=== Future appearances ===
Hương Giang Nguyễn and Huy Phương "Criss" Lai, as well as Minh Long Nguyễn and Sơn Ngọc Minh (who compete as separate teams), later competed in the fifth season which aired in 2016. Hương Giang appeared on the sixth season as a clue giver during the third episode and served as the host during the seventh episode in 2019.

== Results ==
The following teams participated in the season, with their relationships at the time of filming. Note that this table is not necessarily reflective of all content broadcast on television due to inclusion or exclusion of some data.

Team	Position (by leg)											Roadblocks performed
Team	1	2	3	4	5	6	7	8	9	10	11	Roadblocks performed
Hương Giang & Criss	2nd	7th	1st	1st	2nd⊃	2nd	4th^{9}	2nd	3rd^{13}	1st	1st	Hương Giang 5, Criss 6^{9}
Trang Trần & Hiếu Nguyễn	5th	4th	4th	4th	3rd	3rd	2nd	3rd	2nd^{12}	3rd	2nd^{15}	Trang Trần 5, Hiếu Nguyễn 6^{16}
Trang Khiếu & An Đinh	6th	6th	7th	6th	6th	6th^{8}	3rdƒ	4th	4th^{14}	2nd	3rd^{16}	Trang Khiếu 6, An Đinh 4
Kiwi & Hoàng Dương	8th	5th	5th	7th^{4}	1st	1st	1st	1st	1st^{12}	4th		Mai Trang 4, Hoàng Dương 6
Ngọc Minh & Mint	1st	3rd	3rd	5th	5th⊂ε^{5}^{,}^{6}	5th^{8}	5th^{9}^{,}^{10}	5th				Ngọc Minh 4, Mint 4^{9}
Long Điền & Kim Dung	3rd	1st	2nd	2nd	4th	4th	6th^{9}^{,}^{11}					Long Điền 4^{9}, Kim Dung 3
Kim Thanh & Khải Anh	9th	8th^{1}	6th	3rd	7th^{7}							Kim Thanh 2, Khải Anh 3
Miko & Hoàng Nam	4th	2nd	8th^{2}^{,}^{3}									Miko 1, Hoàng Nam 2
Minh Long & Sơn Việt	7th	9th										Minh Long 2, Sơn Việt 0

Key

- A red team placement means the team was eliminated.
- A purple ε indicates that the team decided to use the Express Pass on that leg.
- A green ƒ indicates that the team won a Fast Forward.
- A blue team placement indicates that the team came in last on a non-elimination leg.
  - An underlined blue placement indicates that the team was "Marked for Elimination" and had to come in first on the next leg, otherwise they would be served a 30-minute penalty.
  - An italicized blue placement indicates that the team would not receive any money at the start of the next leg.
- An underlined leg number indicates that there was no mandatory rest period at the Pit Stop and all teams were ordered to continue racing. An underlined team placement indicates that the team came in last and was not eliminated.
- A brown ⊃ indicates that the team chose to use the U-Turn; ⊂ indicates the team who received it.

Notes

1. Kim Thanh & Khải Anh initially arrived 2nd, but were issued a 30-minute penalty for being "Marked for Elimination" and not coming in 1st. Six teams checked in during the penalty time, dropping Kim Thanh & Khải Anh to 8th.
2. Miko Lan Trinh & Hoàng Nam did not complete the weight-guessing challenge and were issued a 1-hour penalty before receiving their next clue.
3. Miko Lan Trinh & Hoàng Nam initially arrived in 7th, but they had lost their Detour clue and could not check in without issuing a 30-minute penalty. Trang Khiếu & An Đinh, who checked in after them in last place, had found their clue. They were given the option of returning the clue to Miko Lan Trinh & Hoàng Nam, but doing so would eliminate them. Trang Khiếu & An Đinh chose not to return the clue and settled for the 7th-place finish, resulting in Miko Lan Trinh & Hoàng Nam's elimination.
4. Leg 4 was originally planned as an elimination leg (which would have resulted with Mai Trang & Hoàng Dương eliminated), but shortly afterwards they were informed to still be in the competition in a prior brief scenario and that they would keep on racing.
5. Sơn Ngọc Minh & Mint used their Express Pass to bypass the Detour in Leg 5, however they still had to do one side of the Detour since Hương Giang & Criss U-Turned them before they got to the board.
6. Sơn Ngọc Minh & Mint initially arrived 4th, but were issued a 15-minute penalty for not earning enough money during the hat-selling challenge. Long Điền & Kim Dung checked-in during the penalty time, dropping Sơn Ngọc Minh & Mint to 5th.
7. Kim Thanh & Khải Anh were issued a 2-hour penalty at the marketplace for not completing the hat-selling challenge.
8. Sơn Ngọc Minh & Mint were not able to climb one of the inflatable platforms and were issued a 15-minute penalty before getting their next clue. Trang Khiếu & An Đinh were not able to climb two of the platforms and issued a 30-minute penalty before getting their next clue.
9. Criss, Long Điền and Mint were unable to complete the Roadblock; their teams were all issued 1-hour penalties at the Roadblock site.
10. Sơn Ngọc Minh & Mint were issued a 30-minute penalty as they borrowed money from locals to pay for their final taxi ride of the day, which was prohibited by the rules. They elected to serve their penalty at the start of the next leg.
11. Long Điền & Kim Dung were issued a 1-hour penalty at the desert for not completing the pot-balancing challenge.
12. Kiwi Ngô Mai Trang & Đỗ Hoàng Dương and Trang Trần & Hiếu Nguyễn initially arrived 1st and 2nd respectively, but were each issued a 30-minute penalty for talking while inside of the Jeju Stone Museum. This did not affect either teams' placements.
13. Hương Giang & Criss arrived in 3rd, but they had lost their leg's final clue. They were required to backtrack and retrieve the clue before they could check in. This did not affect their placement.
14. Trang Khiếu & An Đinh left the Pit Start at Leg 9 by approximately an hour late because An Đinh had difficulties traveling internationally with her passport. This did not affect their departure placement since they were the last to depart.
15. Hiếu Nguyễn was unable to complete the Roadblock on Leg 11 and he & Trang Trần were issued a 1-hour penalty at the Roadblock site.
16. Trang Khiếu & An Đinh were unable to complete the high-wire challenge on Leg 11 and were issued a 2-hours-and-30-minute penalty at the site.

== Prizes ==
- Leg 1 – The Express Pass (Thẻ Ưu Tiên) – an item that can be used to skip any one task of the team's choosing up until the 8th leg.
- Leg 5 – A vacation to the Alba Hot Springs, Huế.
- Leg 11 – 300,000,000₫

== Race Summary ==
Full Route

Destinations	Air travel Rail travel Water travel Bus travel Helicopter travel Bicycle travel Gondola travel
Route Markers	Lựa chọn kép (Detour) Vượt rào (Roadblock) Nhảy cóc (Fast Forward); Rào cản (U-Turn) Về đích (Pit Stop)

=== Leg 1 (Quảng Ninh) ===
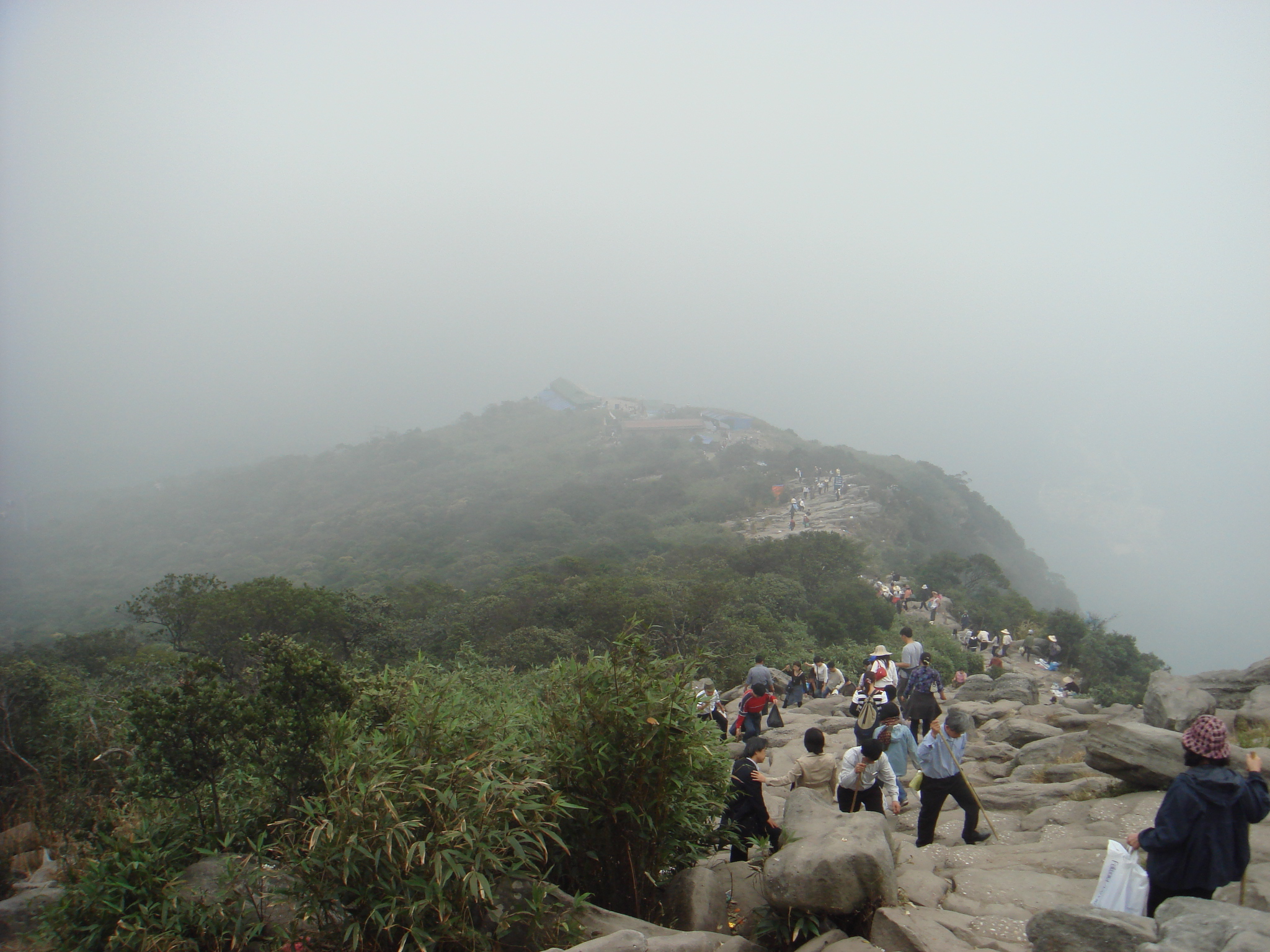
The Yen Tu Mountain was the first destination of the season after racers left Hạ Long.

Airdates: 21 & 22 June 2014

- Hạ Long, Quảng Ninh Province, Vietnam (Tuần Châu Harbor) (Starting Line)
- Hạ Long (Bãi Cháy Bridge)
- Hạ Long (Muong Thanh Hotel)
- Yen Tu Mountain (Hoa Yen Pagoda)
- Yen Tu Mountain (Mot Mai Pagoda)
- Yen Tu Mountain (Trần Nhân Tông Buddha Statue (in Vietnamese))
- Yen Tu Mountain (Copper Pagoda)

In this season's first Roadblock, one team member had to rappel off of the bridge to reach the bottom of a hanging rope, where they would grab two bottles of Sting. They would then get a clue instructing them to travel alone to Muong Thanh Hotel, where they had to search for their partner who was hidden somewhere on the 18th, 19th or 20th floor. Once reunited, they would receive their next clue.

This season's first Detour was a choice between Ăn (Eat) or Học (Learn). In Ăn, teams would have to properly cook three vegetarian meals: tofu, water spinach and prepared peanuts. In Học, teams had to memorize a spoken poem by Nguyên Hỏa, both the original version written in old Vietnamese, and the modern translated version. If they could recite both versions correctly, teams would get their next clue.

Additional tasks

- At Tuần Châu Harbor, team members had to take turns kayaking out into the water to find boats filled with balls. They had to find five balls that, together, contained the words Cuộc đua kỳ thú 2014 in order to get their next clue. However, each team member would only grab one ball at a time before they had to return and let their partner have a turn.
- At the Mot Mai Pagoda, team had to search for a large box filled with books, and had to transport this box to the Trần Nhân Tông Buddha Statue. They would deliver the box to a monk, who would ask them for "The Green Lotus Bud". Teams had to figure out that this was the name of one of the books in the box and present said book to him. In exchange, he would hand them their next clue. If teams could not figure out what The Green Lotus Bud was, they could continue to climb the mountain to the chairlift station (bringing the books with them), where an attendant would tell them the answer.

=== Leg 2 (Quảng Ninh → Hanoi) ===
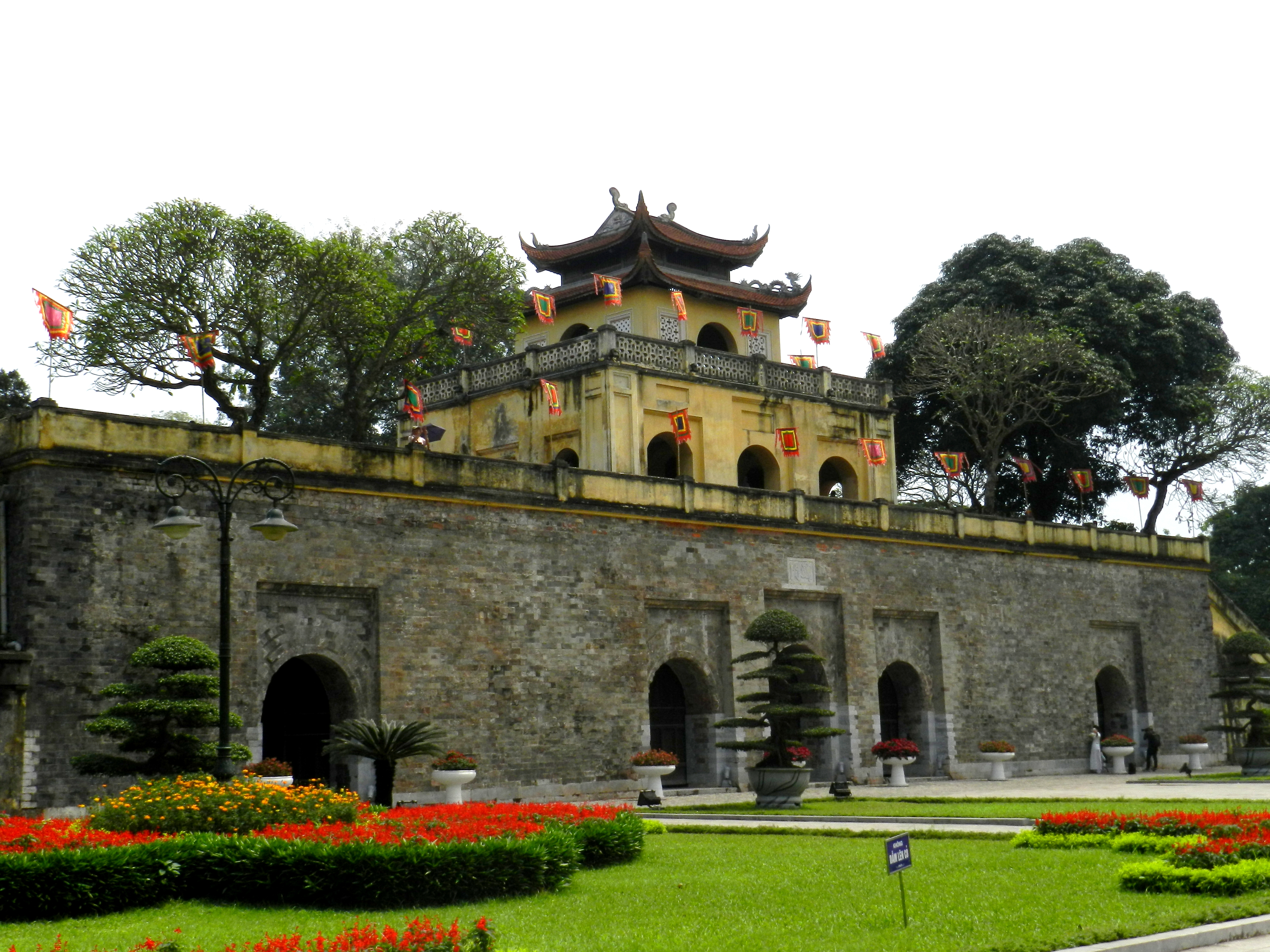
The Imperial Citadel of Thăng Long in Hanoi served as the second Pit Stop.

Airdates: 28 & 29 June 2014

- Hanoi (Ngọc Sơn Temple) (Pit Start)
- Hanoi (Gas Station at the Intersection of Hang Bun Street and Yen Phu Street)
- Hanoi (Near Cua Bac Street)
- Hanoi (Quán Thánh Temple)
- Hanoi (Bach Ma Temple (in Vietnamese))
- Hanoi (Kim Liên Pagoda)
- Hanoi (Voi Phuc Temple (in Vietnamese))
- Hanoi (Duong Lam Village (in Vietnamese))
- Hanoi (Ta Hien Street)
- Hanoi (Imperial Citadel of Thăng Long)

In this leg's Roadblock, one team member would have to apply shaving cream to three balloons and then use a straight-edge razor to shave it off. If any of the balloons popped, teams had to serve a 15-minute penalty before trying again.

This leg's Detour was a choice between Trống (Drum) or Chè (Candy). In Trống, teams traveled to a nearby temple. Once there, teams would have to balance on a seesaw. One team member had to raise their partner up high enough to be able to strike a drum three times, making sure not to go too low themselves or they would pop the balloons that were attached to the underside. They then exchange all the flags they were holding to their partner on the other side, letting neither side of the seesaw touch the ground. In Chè, teams would have to make a traditional candy called Che Lam. If a judge was satisfied with their cooking, they would receive their next clue. Both Detours had only a maximum of two work stations.

Additional tasks

- Teams had to drive themselves from the Ngoc Son Temple to the gas station on motorcycles. There, they had to search for a marked person.
- After the Roadblock, teams would follow a series of hints as to where they had to go next. These hint would direct them to four temples around the city, making the north, south, east and west gates to the ancient city. At each temple, they had to search for a marked photograph depicting the next temple, which they would pick up. While on the grounds of any of these temples, team members could not communicate with one another. A person at the last temple (Voi Phuc) would give them their next clue if they had all four photographs.
- The clue at the Voi Phuc Temple would instruct teams to copy a traditional Dong Ho picture using traditional brushes. If they could copy the picture perfectly, they would get their next clue.
- At Duong Lam Village, teams needed to find the oldest house in the village to get their next clue.
- After the Detour, teams had to find a marked location, where they would play the local game of Đẩy gậy against two strong opponents. Players would stand on a slippery playing area, and each party would hold onto a stick. They had to try to pull or push the stick in order to get their opponents to leave the playing area. If teams would remain in the playing area for three minutes, they would receive their next clue.
- On Ta Hien street, teams had to search for a hidden marked person who would give them their next clue. They would then have to sell five scarves to locals, making a total of 1.5 million ₫ (About US$70).

=== Leg 3 (Hanoi → Dien Bien) ===
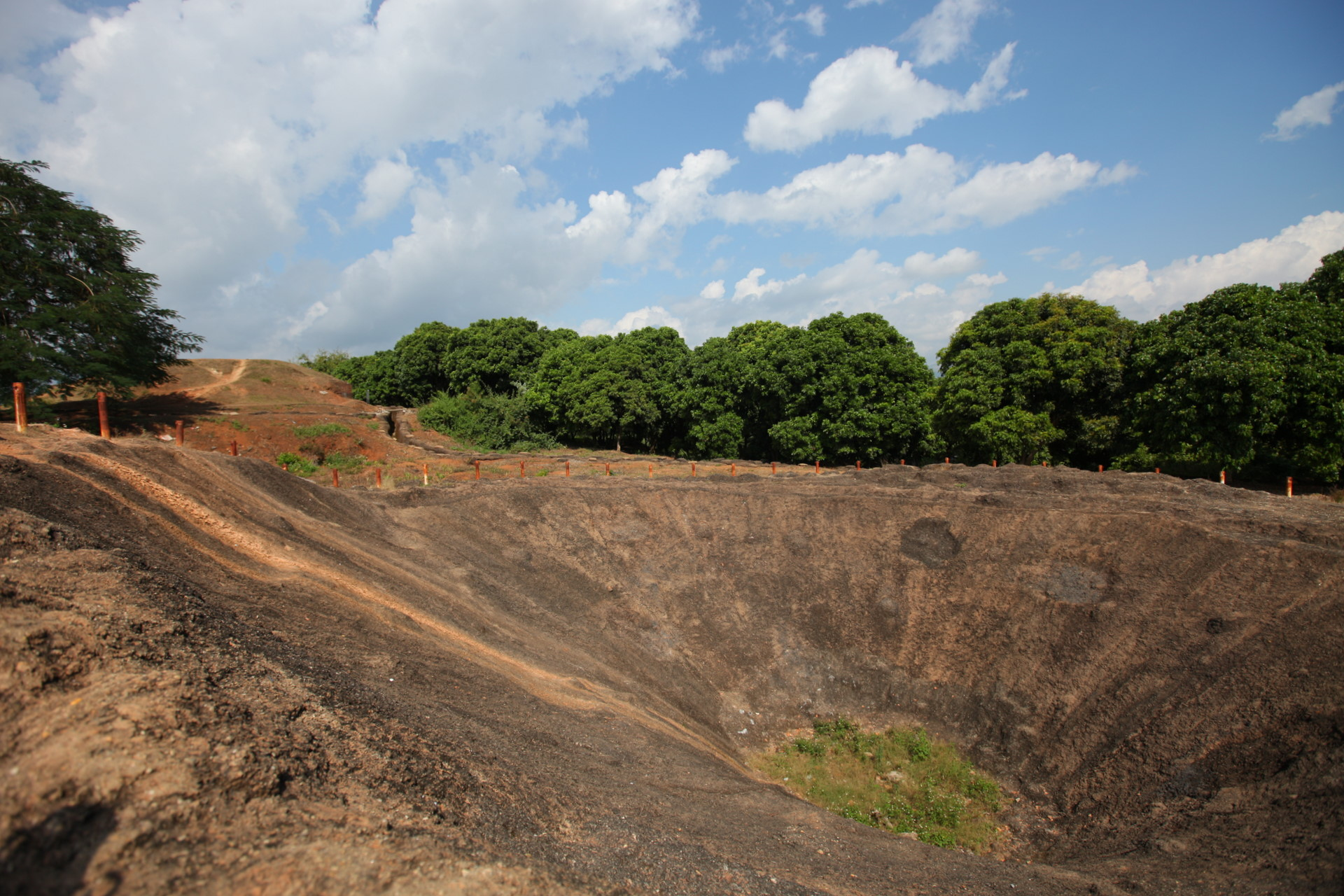
At A1 Hill in Dien Bien Phu, teams concluded the third leg, which centered around the Battle of Dien Bien Phu.

Airdates: 5 & 6 July 2014

- Hanoi to Dien Bien Phu, Điện Biên Province (Bến xe khách Điện Biên) (Pit Start)
- Dien Bien Phu (Kéo Pháo Memorial)
- Tuan Giao (Ban Po Village) (Overnight Rest)
- Muong Phang (Military Control Center for Battle of Dien Bien Phu)
- Pá Khoang (Ban Vang 1 Village)
- Dien Bien Phu (Barracks near A1 Hill (in Vietnamese))
- Dien Bien Phu (A1 Hill)

In this leg's Roadblock, one team member had to hold a spoon in their mouth and balance an egg on it. While balancing the egg, they had to observe the statues of soldiers around the memorial. After this, they would be asked how many soldiers there were (29) and how many soldiers with hats there were (28). If teams got the correct answer, they would receive their next clue. If not, they had to wait 15 minutes before trying again. Only two teams could attempt this task at a time.

This leg's Detour was a choice between Quân (Soldier) or Dân (Citizen). In Quân, teams had to dig a precise, exact rectangular hole into the ground, following military specifications, to receive their next clue. In Dân, teams had to use bamboo-frame bicycles to transfer four bags each filled with 40 kg (88 lb) of rice across the village to a marked location to receive their next clue.

Additional tasks

- At Ban Po, teams would have to build tools they could attach to an old waterwheel and then use them to fill up a large vase with water.
- After the waterwheel task, teams had to find a designated place in the village and learn a traditional bamboo dance. However, both team members had to wear incredibly heavy shoes while they danced. Each shoe weighed 2.5 kg (5.5 lb). Teams would then have to convince a local family to let them stay for the night.
- In the morning, teams had to find the oldest house of Ban Po, where they would receive two goats. They had to lead the goats through the village to a marked place, where they would have to guess the goats' weight. Teams only had a margin for error of 0.5 kg (1.1 lb). If they guessed the correct weight, teams would get their next clue. If not, they had to return their goats to the goat pen and serve a short penalty before they could try again.
- At the control center, teams had to build a special kind of fire known as Bếp Hoàng Cầm, used during the war because it made no smoke. Once it was built, teams had to boil a hotpan of water over it to get their next clue.
- At the barracks, one person would be tied to a fixture with a rope, while the other would be tied to another with an elastic. The second team member had to fight the elastic to hand over a flag to their partner.

=== Leg 4 (Điện Biên → Nghệ An) ===
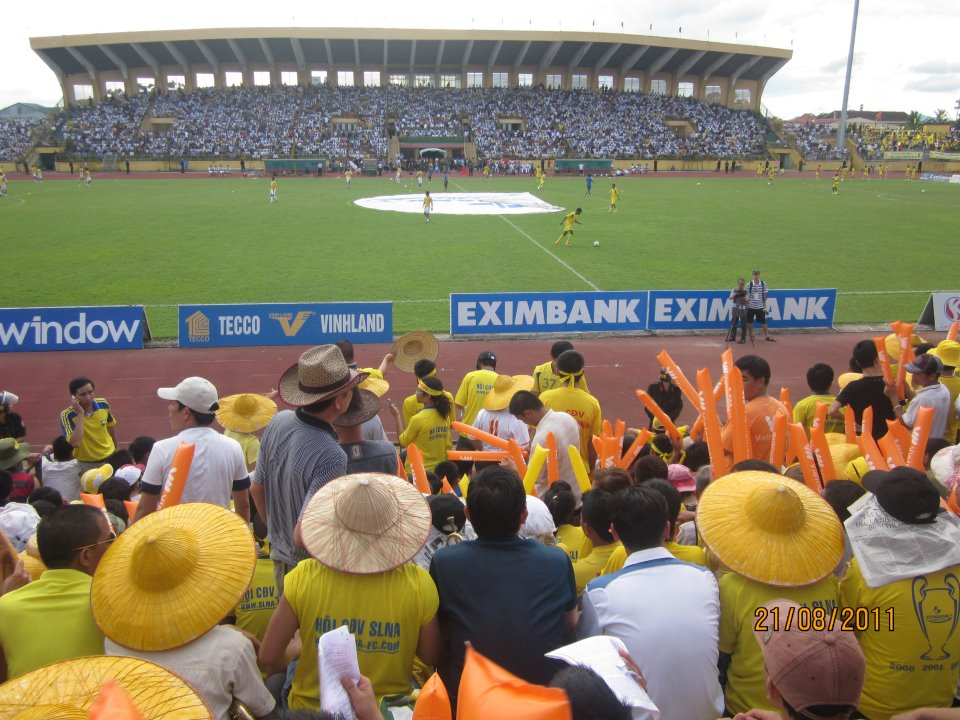
At Vinh Stadium, teams had to successfully complete various soccer exercises.

Airdates: 12 & 13 July 2014

- Dien Chau, Nghệ An Province (Đến Cuông (in Vietnamese))
- Dien Chau (Trai Bo Ecological Tourist Zone)
- Dien Kim (Diễn Kim Bridge)
- Dien Chau (Kim Lien Salt Plains Corporation [Cánh Đồng Muối HTX Kim Liên])
- Vinh (Vinh Stadium)
- Vinh (King Quang Trung Temple)

This leg's Detour was a choice between Tinh Mắt (Sharp-Eyed) or Siêng Năng (Diligent). In Tinh Mắt, teams would have enter the water and observe a group of swimming ducks in a pond. They had to look closely and pick out two ducks with ribbons around their feet matching the team's colour to get their next clue. In Siêng Năng, teams had to use the provided tools to harvest 15 kg (33 lb) of the nearby plants and prepare feed for the elephants, and then had to feed 5 kg (11 lb) of the feed to the elephants. They then had to clean up elephant waste until they had collected 50 kg (110 lb) and had to transport it to a disposal site.

In this leg's Roadblock, one team member had to make their way to the boats beneath the bridge, where they would learn a traditional Hò love song. They had 30 minutes to memorize and perform this song to get their next clue. If they performed the song wrong, they would receive a 15-minute penalty.

Additional tasks

- At Đến Cuông, teams had to put together a puzzle with numbers written on the pieces, and use the numbers to find a related word. They then had to follow the given key which would help them translate the numbers into letters. If they came up with the correct code word of Vương (King), they would receive their next clue.
- At the salt plains, teams had to help harvest salt. They had to shovel up the sand that had previously been laid, and then pick up the sand with their feet, adding water to it. They would then spread this onto a smaller field, as it now had a high concentration of salt. They then had to harvest the salt until they had collected at least 70 kg (150 lb), as well as spread new sand onto the field. Finally, they had to use a wheelbarrow to transport the salt they had harvested to a nearby boat. There, they would receive their next clue.
- At Vinh Stadium, teams had to perform a number of soccer exercises. First, teams had to hit the ball between themselves using only their heads and keep it airborne for 4 hits, 2 each. Then, one team member would kick the ball around a series of cones and kick it to their partner, who had run through a slalom of sticks. Their partner had to kick it into an open goal. Teams had to kick three out of five goals in order for them to get their next clue. If they failed this, they would receive a 15-minute penalty.

=== Leg 5 (Nghệ An → Thừa Thiên Huế) ===
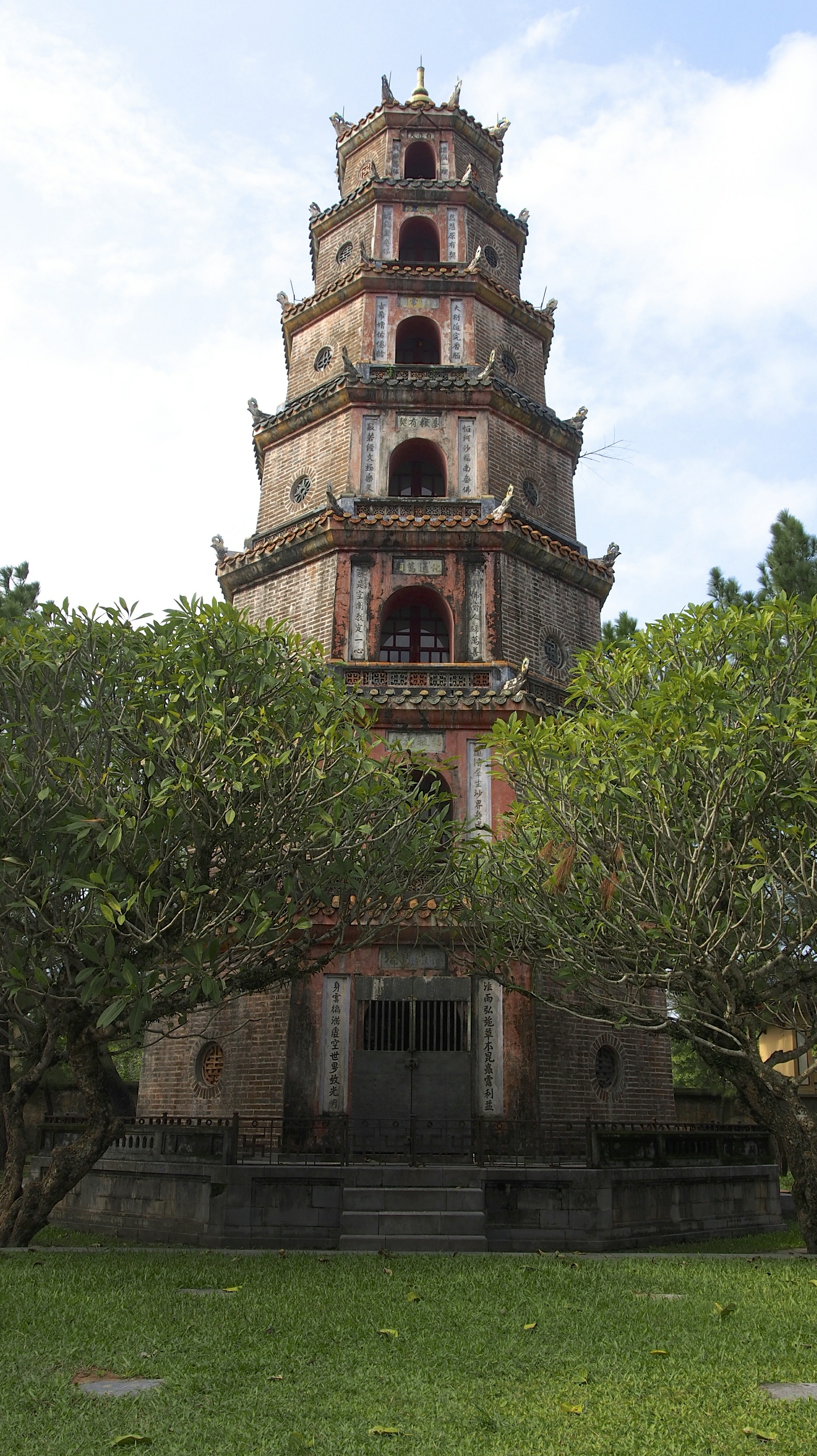
Teams encountered a U-Turn at Thiên Mụ Pagoda in Huế.

Airdates: 19 & 20 July 2014

- Huế, Thừa Thiên Huế Province (Alba Hot Springs)
- Huế (Perfume River or Le Brothers Gallery)
- Huế (Thiên Mụ Pagoda)
- Huế (Cầu Ngói Thanh Toàn (in Vietnamese))
- Huế (Dong Ba Market)
- Huế (School of Specialized Futures [Trường Chuyên Biệt Tương Lai])
- Huế (Quoc Hoc Temple)

In this leg's Roadblock, one team member had to ride the park's zipline. During the ride, they would have to memorize the numbers they saw along the ride. Then, they had to punch in the string of numbers in the correct order as they appeared to dial a person who would have their next clue.

This leg's Detour was a choice between Truyền Thống (Tradition) or Hiện Đại (Modern). In Truyền Thống, teams had to take a basket and wade into the Perfume River. where they would use it to collect snails from the waterbed. Once they had collected at least 5 kg (11 lb), teams would get their next clue. In Hiện Đại, teams had to use the provided tools and materials to install a work of modern art. Once their work was approved by a judge, teams would get their next clue.

Additional tasks

- Once at the Alba Hot Springs, one team member had to complete a complex high-altitude ropes course while blindfolded (The Hi-Wire course). Their partner would be on the ground verbally guiding them. Once they retrieved their clue halfway through, they would take off their blindfolds and complete the course with their next clue held in their mouth. If they dropped the clue, they had to start all over again. Once they rode a short zipline and rejoined with their partner, they then had to make their way to the park's large zipline to find this leg's Roadblock.
- At Thiên Mụ Pagoda, teams had to learn and perform a traditional song and dance routine known as múa chén. When they met the approval of a judge, they would get their next clue.
- At Cầu Ngói Thanh Toàn, teams had to make an intricate, traditional Vietnamese hat (Nón). Once their hat was approved, they would receive their next clue.
- Teams would bring 20 of the aforementioned hats to the Dong Ba Market, where they had to sell every one of them to locals. Teams could sell each hat for any price they wanted, and had to reach a total profit of 3,000,000₫ in order to get their next clue.
- Teams would donate all of the money they had made selling hats to the School for Specialized Futures.

=== Leg 6 (Thừa Thiên Huế → Khánh Hòa) ===
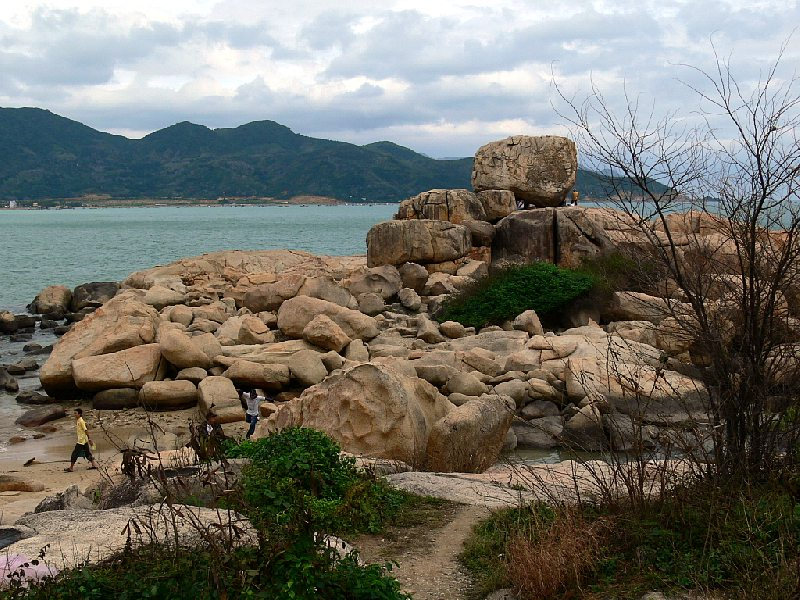
Upon arrival in Nha Trang, teams traveled to the Hòn Chồng rock formation.

Airdates: 26 & 27 July 2014

- Huế (Huế Railway Station) to Nha Trang, Khánh Hòa Province (Nha Trang Railway Station)
- Nha Trang (Hòn Chồng (in Vietnamese))
- Nha Trang (Công Cộng Public Beach)
- Nha Trang (Biển Xanh Beach)
- Nha Trang (Bến Cano Dinh Bảo Đại)
- Nha Trang (Hòn Mun Islands (in Vietnamese))
- Nha Trang (Nha Trang Naval Institute)
- Nha Trang (Floating Market)
- Nha Trang (Waterland)

In this leg's Roadblock, one team member had to dive down to a coral reef where they had to search for one of many underwater boxes. They could use a provided key to open these boxes, and only one of them would contain a glass sphere, which they could bring back to the boat and exchange for their next clue.

This leg's Detour was a choice between Lên Núi (Mountain Top) or Xuống Biển (Deep Sea). In Lên Núi, teams had to search around an incredibly rocky and unstable path of one of the Hon Mun islands, looking for their next clue hidden amongst the rocks. In Xuống Biển, they had to properly repair a broken salvage net at a different Hon Mun island.

Additional tasks

- At the public beach, teams had to apply paint to their bodies except their hands and feet and then apply the paint to a canvas. Once they had finished painting a picture that represented Nha Trang, teams would get their next clue.
- At the second beach, teams had to swim out into the water where they had to climb onto seven large inflatable action platforms and follow the instructions of a man on the beach. Once they had successfully mounted each one of them, they would swim out to an outrigger boat. There they had to 10 Sting bottles into a net and bring them back to shore, where they would receive their next clue.
- Teams would be taken from Bến Cano Dinh Bảo Đại to the site of the Roadblock in a motorboat.
- At the Naval Institute, teams would have to participate in a naval rescue exercise. One team member had to learn to properly tie knots in a rope used for rescuing people, and then use it to rescue their partner from a life preserver in the water.
- Teams had to paddle unwieldy basket boats out to a boat on the floating market, where they had to successfully make grilled fish (Chả cá). Once they had gathered and prepared the ingredients, they had to bring their small stove into the basket boat and paddle out into the middle of the water as the fish cooked, after which they could return to the boat. If a judge approved of their fish, and they didn't take so long in the water that it burned, they would receive their next clue.

=== Leg 7 (Khánh Hòa → Ninh Thuận) ===
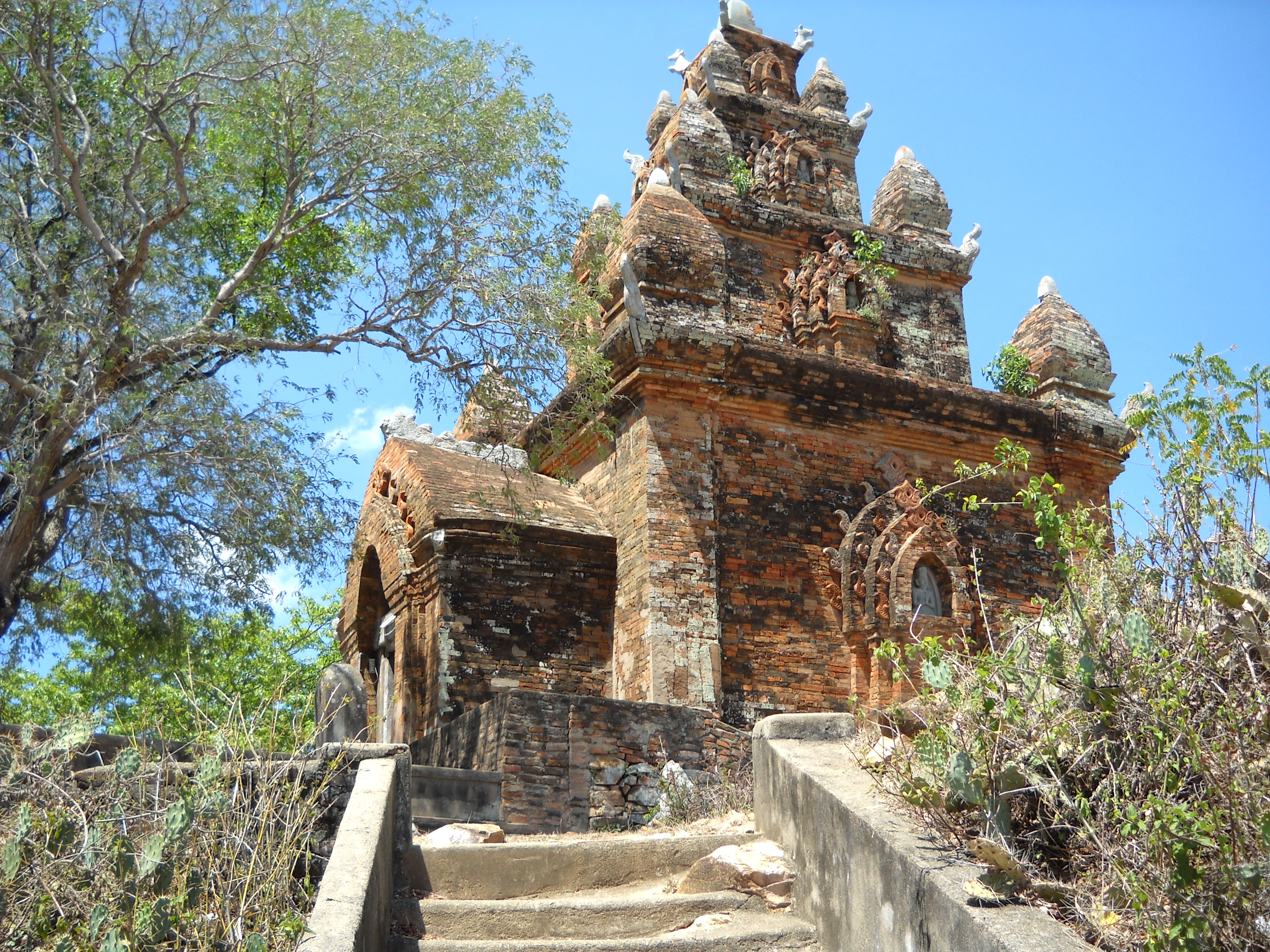
The Po Rome Tower in Ninh Phước hosted the Pit Stop for the seventh leg.

Airdates: 2 & 3 August 2014

- Nha Trang (Waterland)
  - Ninh Hải, Ninh Thuận Province (Pacific Beach Resort)
- Thuận Nam (Van Lam Village Stone Cemetery)
- Ninh Phước (Phước Lập Village)
- Ninh Phước (Bàu Trúc Pottery Village or Ba Mọi Little Farm)
- Ninh Phước (Nam Cương Sand Hill)
- Ninh Phước (Po Rome Tower (in Vietnamese))

For this season's only Fast Forward, each team member from one team had to eat an incredibly large serving lamb to win the Fast Forward award.

In this leg's Roadblock, one team member had to enter a pen of sheep and herd two sheep into adjoining pens, one with a green bandana and one with a red bandana. However, they would be blindfolded and had to rely only on verbal clues from their partner.

This leg's Detour was a choice between Đất Đai (Land) or Cây Trái (Fruit Trees). In Đất Đai, teams had to travel to the pottery village where they would have to craft a local clay pot to exact specifications. In Cây Trái, teams made their way to the little farm where they had to care for the grape plants by trimming the vines and branches and then harvest grapes.

Additional tasks

- Before departing Waterland, teams would have to get into a whitewater raft and ride it down a series of heavy rapids. During the wild ride, they had to throw balls so that they landed in nearby baskets. If they could get at least three balls into baskets before they reached the end of the rapids, they would get their next clue. After their second failed attempt, they would only have to get two balls into baskets, and after four failed attempts they would only have to get one in.
- Once at the sand hill, teams had to balance pots of water on top of their heads and walk across the dunes to a designated spot without dropping the pots. They could then use them to fill up a large pot, after which they would repeat the task until the pot was full.

=== Leg 8 (Ninh Thuận → Đồng Tháp) ===
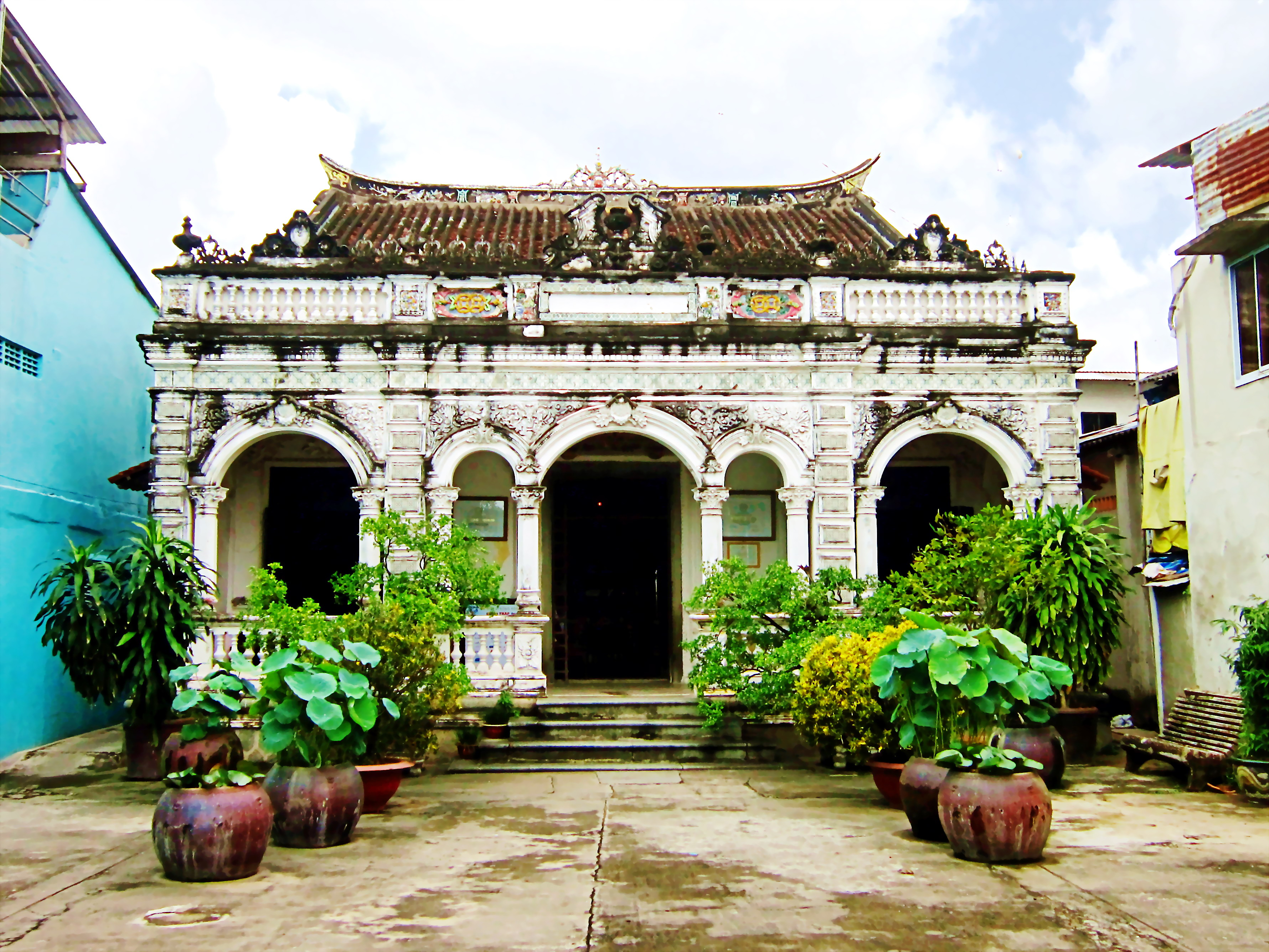
Teams ended the eight leg at the Ancient House of Huỳnh Thủy Lê in Sa Đéc.

Airdates: 9 & 10 August 2014

- Cao Lãnh, Đồng Tháp Province (Xẻo Quýt Resort)
- Cao Lãnh (Anh Út Mười Field)
- Cao Lãnh (Ấp 6 Village – Kênh K6)
- Cao Lãnh to Lai Vung
- Lai Vung (Tân Phước village)
- Châu Thành (Bến Đò Xã Vạt) to An Hiệp (Huỳnh Phát 1 village)
- An Hiệp to Châu Thành (Bến Đò Xã Vạt)
- Sa Đéc (Ancient House of Huỳnh Thủy Lê (in Vietnamese))

This leg's Detour was a choice between Lịch Sử (History) or Truyền Thống (Tradition). In Lịch Sử, teams had to use a series of numerical codes to reveal a passphrase. The numbers would reference specific pages, lines and words in Vietnamese history books. Once they had the correct phrase, they would get their next clue. In Truyền Thống, each team member would have to weave together a traditional thatched basket.

In this leg's Roadblock, one team member had to utilize a large slingshot to fire a coconut at a hanging pan. They would fire five coconuts and had to hit the target three times. Every time they failed, they would have to wait a 15-minute penalty, and would then receive extra shots (7 and then 10) and have to hit the target one less time (2 and then 1).

Additional tasks

- At the Xẻo Quýt Resort, teams had to get into riverboats and paddle themselves down the river to reach their next clue. They would then have to eat a meal of assorted local delicacies, including live worms and cooked scorpions, cockroaches, lizards, frogs and grasshoppers. After they had finished their meal, they would get their Detour information.
- Teams traveled from the resort to the Roadblock location on tandem bikes, and then to the village on the same bikes.
- At Ấp 6 Village, teams had to drive a tilling tractor around a marked field. After this, they would spend the night before receiving their next clue.
- At Tân Phước, teams had to use traditional methods to make an edible food wrapper known as Bánh tráng. Once they had correctly made 42 of these, they would get their next clue.
- At Huỳnh Phát 1, teams would have their legs tied together as in a three-legged race, and had to search around the large brick storage area of the village for their next clue hidden inside of a brick.

=== Leg 9 (Đồng Tháp → South Korea) ===
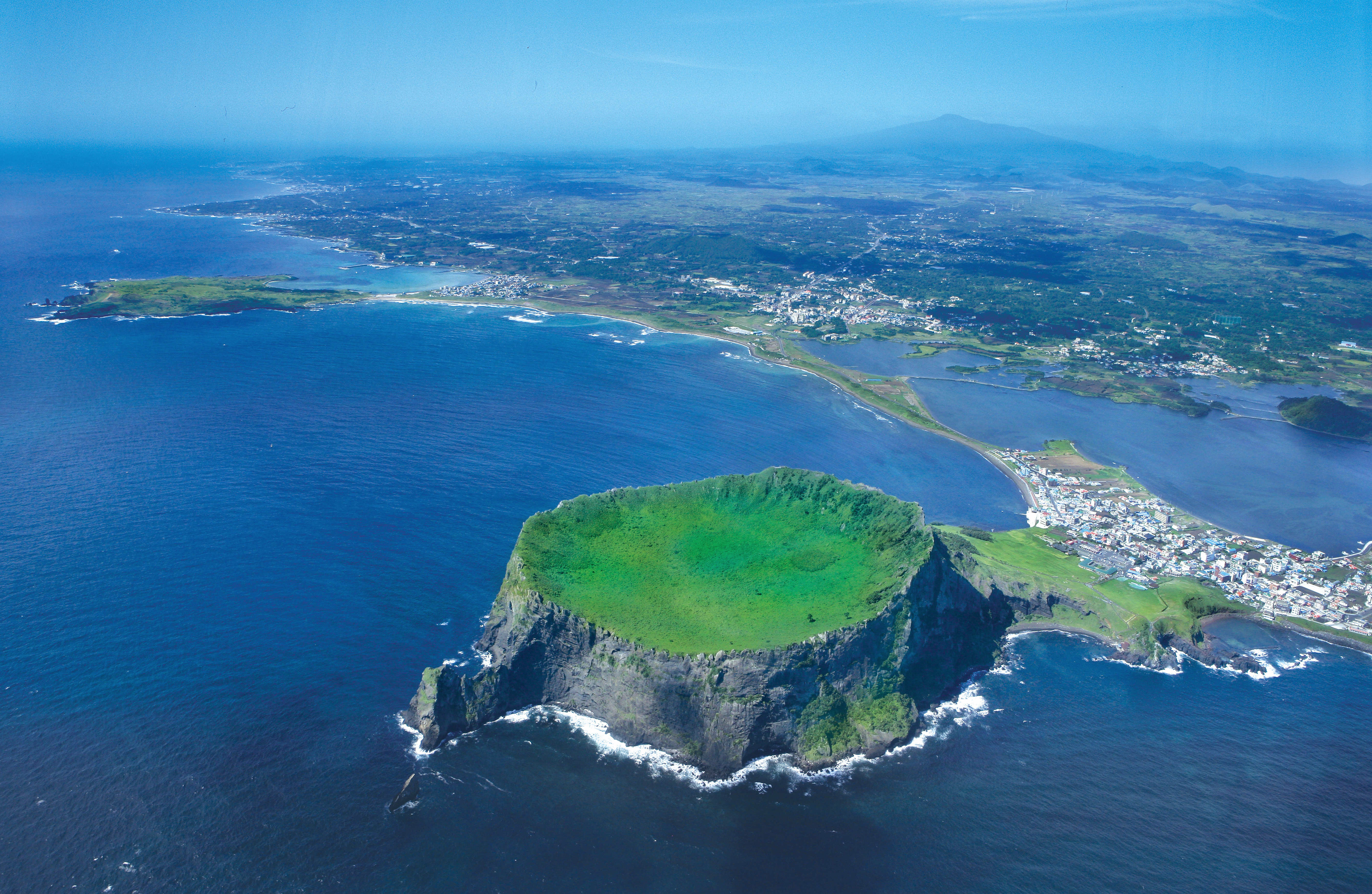
After arriving on Jeju Island, teams' first task took place at Seongsan Ilchulbong.

Airdates: 16 & 17 August 2014

- Ho Chi Minh City (Tan Son Nhat International Airport) to Seoul, South Korea (Incheon International Airport)
- Incheon (Incheon International Airport) to Seoul (Gimpo International Airport)
- Seoul (Gimpo International Airport) to Jeju City, Jeju Island (Jeju International Airport)
- Seogwipo (Seongsan Ilchulbong)
- Jeju City (Kimnyoung Maze Park)
- Jeju City (Jeju Stone Park)
- Seogwipo (Daeyoo Hunting & Shooting Club)
- Seogwipo (Jeju Folk Village)
- Seogwipo (Jeju Folk Village – Dae Jang Geum)

This leg's Detour was a choice between Phóng Tên (Throwing Arrows) or Phất Cờ (Flag Waving). In Phóng Tên, teams had to make their way to a high point of the mountain, on the way retrieving a sticker. Once at the top, they could exchange it for 10 sticks. They had to toss these sticks into a faraway jug, having them land inside. One team member had to throw the sticks from atop their partner's back. Once teams could sink three sticks within 10 throws, they would get their next clue. If they ran out of sticks, they had to climb back down to receive another sticker. In Phất Cờ, one team member would have to travel across the cliffs to a lookout point and use flag semaphore to convey a message to their partner, who remained at the starting point. If the message was conveyed correctly, teams would get their next clue.

In this leg's Roadblock, one team member had to fire a shotgun at launched clay pigeons. Once they had hit and destroyed five clay pigeons, they would receive their next clue. They only had 16 bullets to do this, and if they ran out of bullets they would have to wait 30 minutes before they would receive their next clue.

Additional tasks

- At Kimnyoung Maze Park, teams had to search for two parts of their next clue hidden somewhere inside of the large stone maze in two different clue boxes.
- At Jeju Stone Park, teams had to search among the nearly identical-looking statues for the one depicted in a photograph they had been given. They then had to enter the park's museum and count all of the stones on display. They were not permitted to speak while inside of the museum.
- At Jeju Folk Village, teams would have to dress up in traditional South Korean wedding outfits and convince a local to take their photograph. They then had to search the village for a woman singing a traditional folk song in Korean. She would give them a package of rice, which they would take a marked area. One team member would then use a traditional grinder to grind the rice into a fine powder, while the other had to memorize the same folk song they had previously listened. After grinding the rice they had to perform the song, and would receive their next clue if they sang it correctly.

=== Leg 10 (South Korea) ===
After traveling to Seoul, teams faced a Detour at the N Seoul Tower.

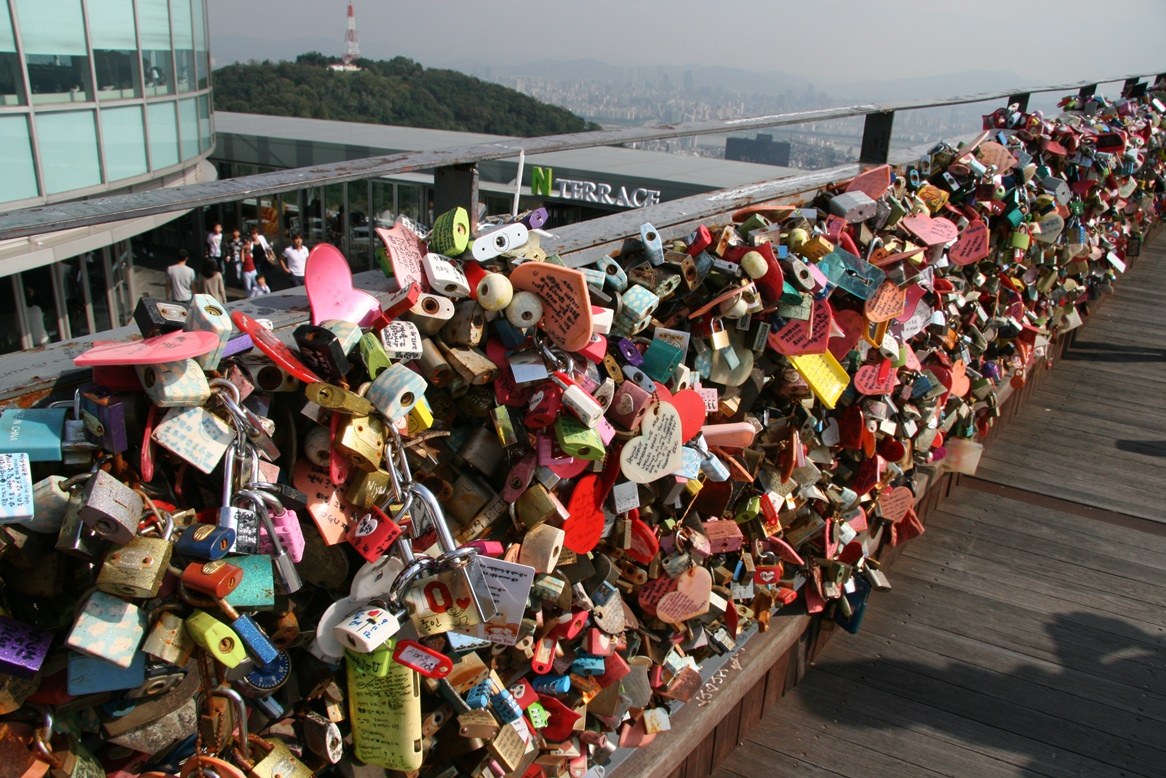
One Detour option in Seoul had teams searching through the love locks at the N Seoul Tower.

Airdates: 23 & 24 August 2014

- Jeju City (Jeju International Airport) to Seoul (Gimpo International Airport) (Pit Start)
- Seoul (Gyeongbokgung)
- Seoul (Bukchon Hanok Village)
- Seoul (N Seoul Tower)
- Seoul (Dongdaemun Design Plaza)
- Seoul (Good Morning City – Spa Rex)
- Seoul (CGV Yeongdeungpo)
- Seoul (Tous Les Jours)
- Gapyeong, Gyeonggi (Riverland Park)
- Incheon (Incheon Asiad Main Stadium)

This leg's Detour was a choice between Tình Yêu (Love) or Khoảng Cách (Distance) In Tình Yêu, teams would choose a key and had to search among thousands of love locks attached to the railing near the tower, attached there by couples in love, for a lock with the Amazing Race logo and unlock it with their key to receive their next clue. In Khoảng Cách, teams made their way to the top of the tower. From there, they had to figure out how far away the tower was from Buenos Aires, Santiago, Rio de Janeiro and Hanoi. They then had to combine these distances into a total amount to get their next clue.

In this leg's Roadblock, one team member had to select a bun or bread product from a basket and eat it. They would then flip over the card placed in front of the basket, which had been dealt out randomly. If teams flipped over a black card, they had to try again. If they flipped over a red card, they would get their next clue. If they flipped over a joker, they had to wait 15 minutes before trying again.

Additional tasks

- At Bukchon Village, teams had to search the village for four people who would each give them a bag. They then had to make their way to a specific house where they would have to make a few traditional crafts.
- Teams would only be given a picture of the Dongdaemun Design Plaza and had to figure out where it was.
- At Spa Rex, teams would enjoy a stay in the sauna, clean the spa and its equipment, receive a spa treatment, and then help pack spa clothing for storage. Once teams had received both treatments and performed both jobs, they would get their next clue.
- At CGV Yeongdeungpo, teams would purchase tickets for the South Korean film The Target. After watching a brief scene from the movie, teams had to use their intuition to figure out what the actors were saying and then re-enact the scene. If they got it correct, teams would get their next clue.
- At Riverland Park, both team members would have to complete a large bungee jump off of a platform over the river. Before their jump, they also had to reach out to a card hanging in midair. If a team member panicked and couldn't jump, the team would receive a 15-minute penalty. However, after the penalty, they would receive a clue telling them they would have to try again anyway.
- At Incheon Sungui Stadium, teams would have two of their legs tied together as in a three-legged race. They then had to complete 15 laps of a course that involved obstacles to climb over and crawl under.

=== Leg 11 (South Korea → Ho Chi Minh City) ===
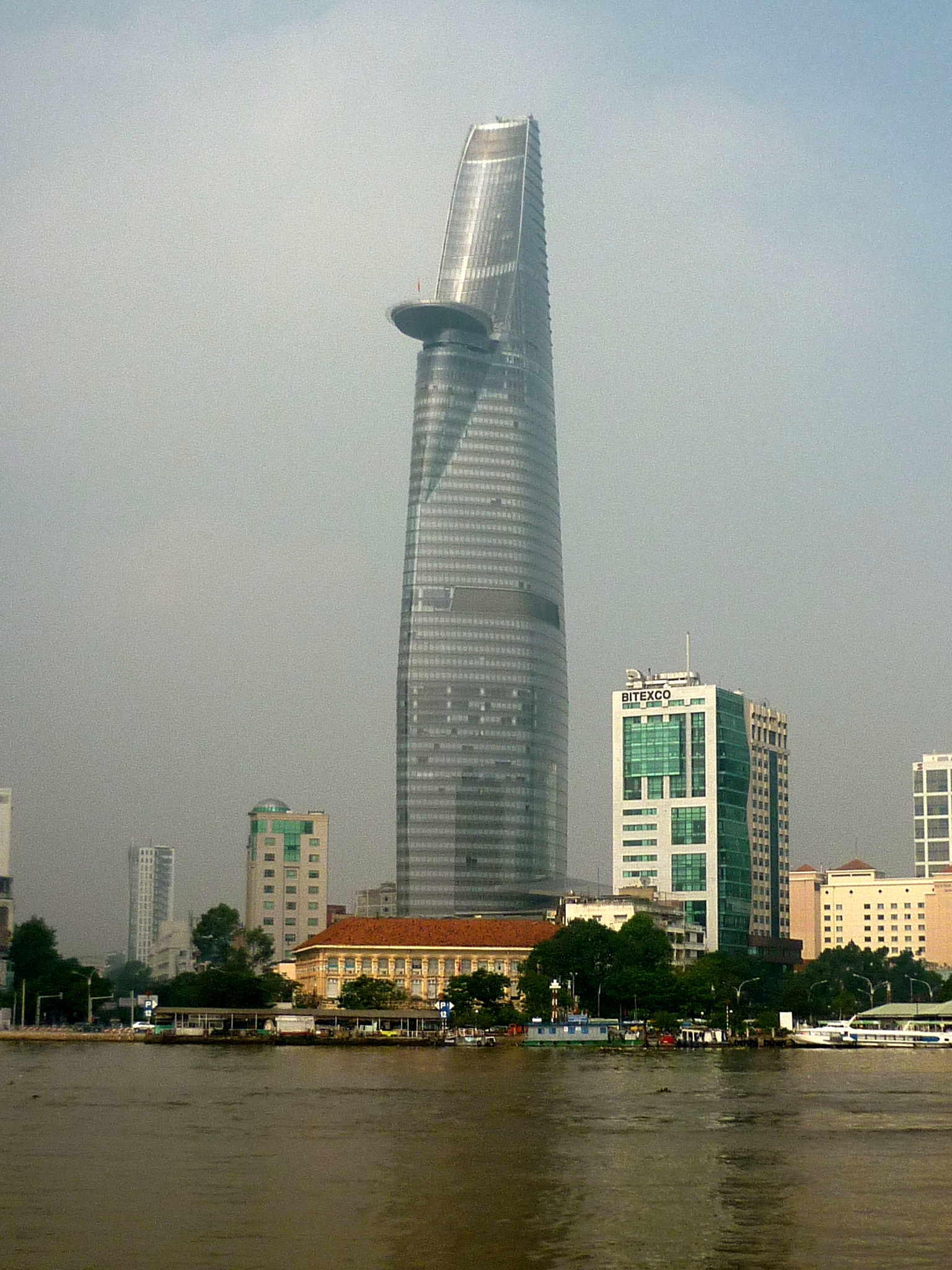
The Bitexco Financial Tower in Ho Chi Minh City served as the Finish Line for The Amazing Race Vietnam 2014.

Airdates: 30 & 31 August 2014

- Seoul (Incheon International Airport) to Ho Chi Minh City, Vietnam (Tan Son Nhat International Airport)
- Ho Chi Minh City (Above Thủ Thiêm Tunnel) (Pit Start)
- Ho Chi Minh City (Saigon Notre-Dame Basilica)
- Ho Chi Minh City (Vân Đồn Swimming Club)
- Ho Chi Minh City (Star Academy or Maximark Supermarket – BHD Star Cinema Maximark 3/2)
- Ho Chi Minh City (Above Thủ Thiêm Tunnel)
- Ho Chi Minh City (Bitexco Financial Tower – BHD Star Cineplex)
- Ho Chi Minh City (Bitexco Financial Tower – 47th Floor)

In this season's final Roadblock, one team member had to play a game similar to beer pong, where they had to bounce a ping pong ball on the table and try to get it to land in three cups of water. Their partner, meanwhile, would be placed into a glass box and slowly lowered into the water. The one performing the Roadblock had to get all three ping pong balls into the three cups of water before 1 minute 30 seconds. Once successful, they would get their next clue. If they failed five times in a row, then after that, the balls would not be reset after each failed attempt.

This season's final Detour was a choice between Ca Hát (Singing) or Ảo Thuật (Fantasy Art). In Ca Hát, teams had to learn and sing the song "'O sole mio" to receive their next clue. In Ảo Thuật, teams had to learn how to perform a series of magic tricks to receive their next clue.

Additional tasks

- At the Notre-Dame Basilica, teams had to search among the many pedestrians there and in the nearby park for one of three who secretly held their next clue. Each clue-giver only had one clue to give out.
- Upon returning to the area above the Thủ Thiêm Tunnel, teams would have to traverse a series of rickety platforms hanging above the water. They had to stand on thin wooden platforms suspended by a wire and then carefully slide the pieces along so that they could traverse the wire without falling off. Only one team at a time could perform this task; first come, first served. Teams had to cross the bridge within 30 minutes, and if they took longer than this they would receive a penalty of 15 minutes for every five minutes they went over the limit.
- At the BHD Star Cineplex in Bitexco Tower, teams would have to play a game. They would have to tilt a table with 12 pool balls on it, trying to get all of them to rest in tiny depressions on the table that marked the 12 points of a Star of David. Six of the balls would start out in positions (the inner points) and at the end, all of the balls on a line had to total 26. If teams could not do this within the given time limit, they would receive a small penalty and the board would be reset. Once all of the balls were sitting in the proper spot, teams would get their next clue.
- Teams had to climb the tower's stairs to reach the Finish Line and could not use elevators.
