= Thuận Nam (disambiguation) =

Thuận Nam may refer to several places in Vietnam:

- Thuận Nam, a commune of Khánh Hòa province
- Thuận Nam District, a former rural district of Ninh Thuận Province
- Thuận Nam, Bình Thuận, a former township and capital of Hàm Thuận Nam District
