= Phước Hậu =

Phước Hậu could be one of the following places in Vietnam.

- Phước Hậu: ward in Vĩnh Long province.
- Phước Hậu: commune in Khánh Hòa province.
