= Ninh Phước =

- Commune
- National Route 1 through Ninh Phước commune
- Interactive map of Ninh Phước
- Coordinates: 11.526019448826583°N 108.92625861380016°E
- Country: Vietnam
- Region: South Central Coast and Central Highlands
- Province: Khánh Hòa
- Established: 2025
- Administrative headquarters: 24 Nguyễn Huệ Street

Area
  - Total: 65.36 km^{2} (25.24 sq mi)

Population (31 December 2024)
  - Total: 70,203
  - Density: 1,074/km^{2} (2,780/sq mi)
- Website: ninhphuoc.khanhhoa.gov.vn

Ninh Phước is a commune in Khánh Hòa province, Vietnam. It is one of the 65 new wards, communes and special zones of the province following the reorganization in 2025.

On 16 June 2025, the Standing Committee of the National Assembly of Vietnam issued Resolution No. 1667/NQ-UBTVQH15 on the arrangement of commune-level administrative units in Khánh Hòa province in 2025. Under the resolution, the entire area and population of Phước Dân township, Phước Thuận commune, and Phước Hải commune, formerly part of Ninh Phước district, were merged to form a new commune named Ninh Phước.
