= Thuận Nam =

- Commune
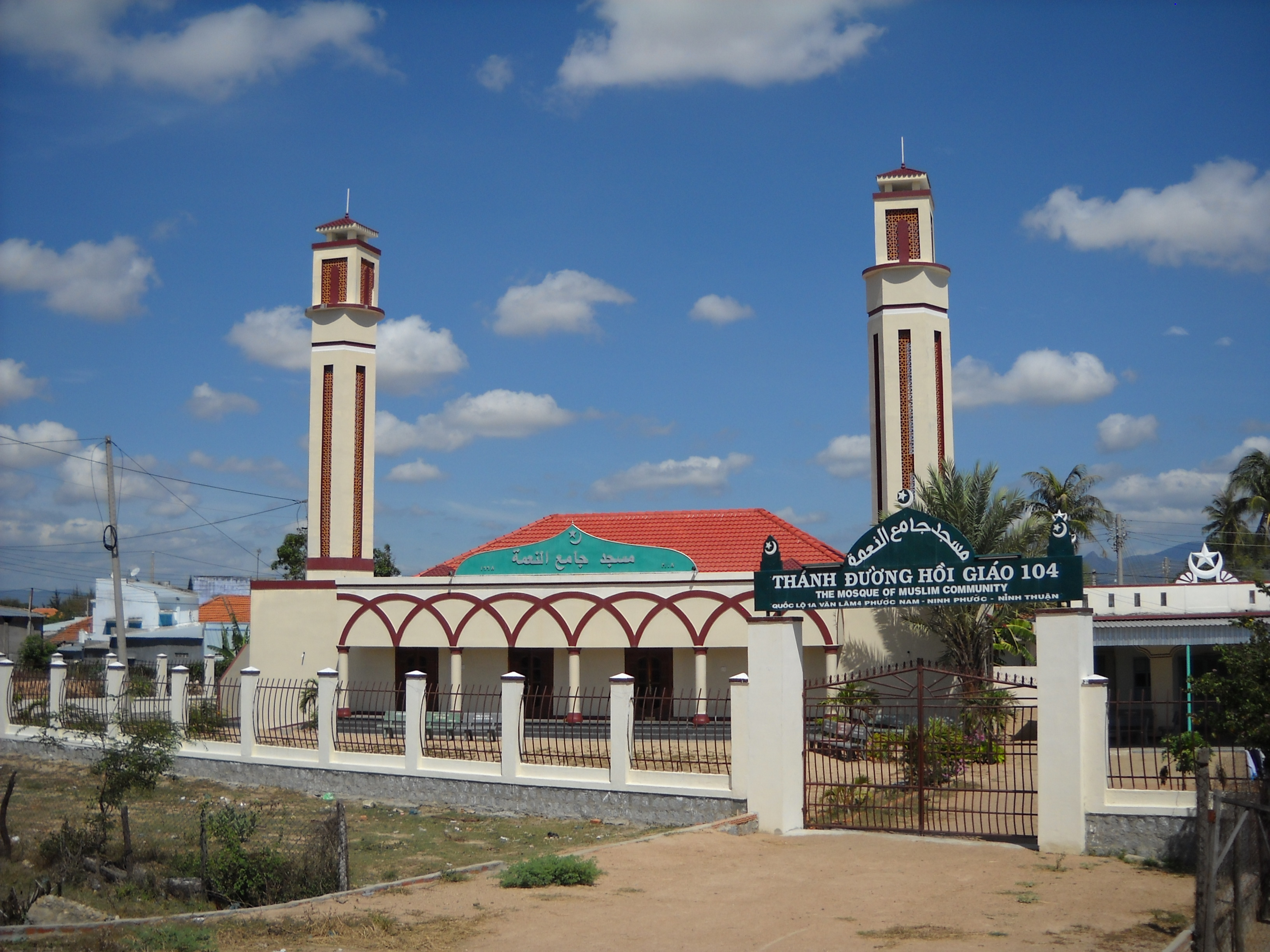
- 104 Mosque
- Interactive map of Thuận Nam
- Coordinates: 11.476585001434035°N 108.9114220505538°E
- Country: Vietnam
- Region: South Central Coast and Central Highlands
- Province: Khánh Hòa
- Established: 2025
- Administrative headquarters: Văn Lâm 3 Hamlet, Thuận Nam commune, Khánh Hòa

Area
  - Total: 140.81 km^{2} (54.37 sq mi)

Population (31 December 2024)
  - Total: 27,262
  - Density: 193/km^{2} (500/sq mi)
- Website: thuannam.khanhhoa.gov.vn

Thuận Nam is a commune in Khánh Hòa province, Vietnam.

On 16 June 2025, the Standing Committee of the National Assembly of Vietnam issued Resolution No. 1667/NQ-UBTVQH15 on the arrangement of commune-level administrative units in Khánh Hòa province in 2025. Under the resolution, the entire area and population of Phước Ninh, Phước Minh, and Phước Nam communes, formerly part of Thuận Nam district, were merged to form a new commune named Thuận Nam.
