= Phước Hậu, Khánh Hòa =

Phước Hậu
- Commune
- Interactive map of Phước Hậu
- Coordinates: 11°36′36″N 108°52′49″E
- Country: Vietnam
- Province: Khánh Hòa
- Establish: June 16, 2025

Area
  - Total: 74.71 km^{2} (28.85 sq mi)

Population
  - Total: 49,465 people
  - Density: 662.1/km^{2} (1,715/sq mi)
- Time zone: UTC+07:00

Phước Hậu is a commune in Khánh Hòa province, Vietnam. It is one of 65 communes, wards, and special zones in the province following the 2025 reorganization.

== History ==
Prior to 2025, the current Phước Hậu commune consisted of three communes: Phước Hậu, Phước Vinh, and Phước Sơn, belonging to Ninh Phước district, Ninh Thuận province.

On June 12, 2025, the National Assembly of Vietnam issued Resolution No. 202/2025/QH15 on the reorganization of provincial-level administrative units. Accordingly:

- Khánh Hòa province was established by merging the entire area and population of Ninh Thuận province and Khánh Hòa province.

On June 16, 2025, the Standing Committee of the National Assembly of Vietnam issued Resolution No. 1667/NQ-UBTVQH15 on the reorganization of commune-level administrative units in Khánh Hòa province. Accordingly:

- Phước Hậu commune was established by merging the entire area and population of the communes of Phước Vinh, Phước Sơn, and Phước Hậu (formerly belonging to Ninh Phước district; Excerpt from Clause 32, Article 1).
