= Mường Phăng =

- Commune and village
- Location in Vietnam
- Coordinates: 21°26′35″N 103°9′17″E
- Country: Vietnam
- Province: Điện Biên
- Time zone: UTC+07:00 (Indochina Time)

Mường Phăng is a commune (xã) and village of the Điện Biên Province, northwestern Vietnam. It is located northeast of the city of Dien Bien Phu and contains the historical relic site of the Dien Bien Phu Campaign Headquarters.

The Standing Committee of the National Assembly issued Resolution No. 1661/NQ-UBTVQH15 on the reorganization of commune-level administrative units of Điện Biên Province in 2025 (effective from 16 June 2025). Accordingly, the entire natural area and population of Nà Nhạn Commune, Pá Khoang Commune, and Mường Phăng Commune are reorganized to form a new commune named Mường Phăng Commune.
