= Ninh Phước district =

District in Southeast Vietnam

Coordinates: 11°31′33″N 108°55′36″E

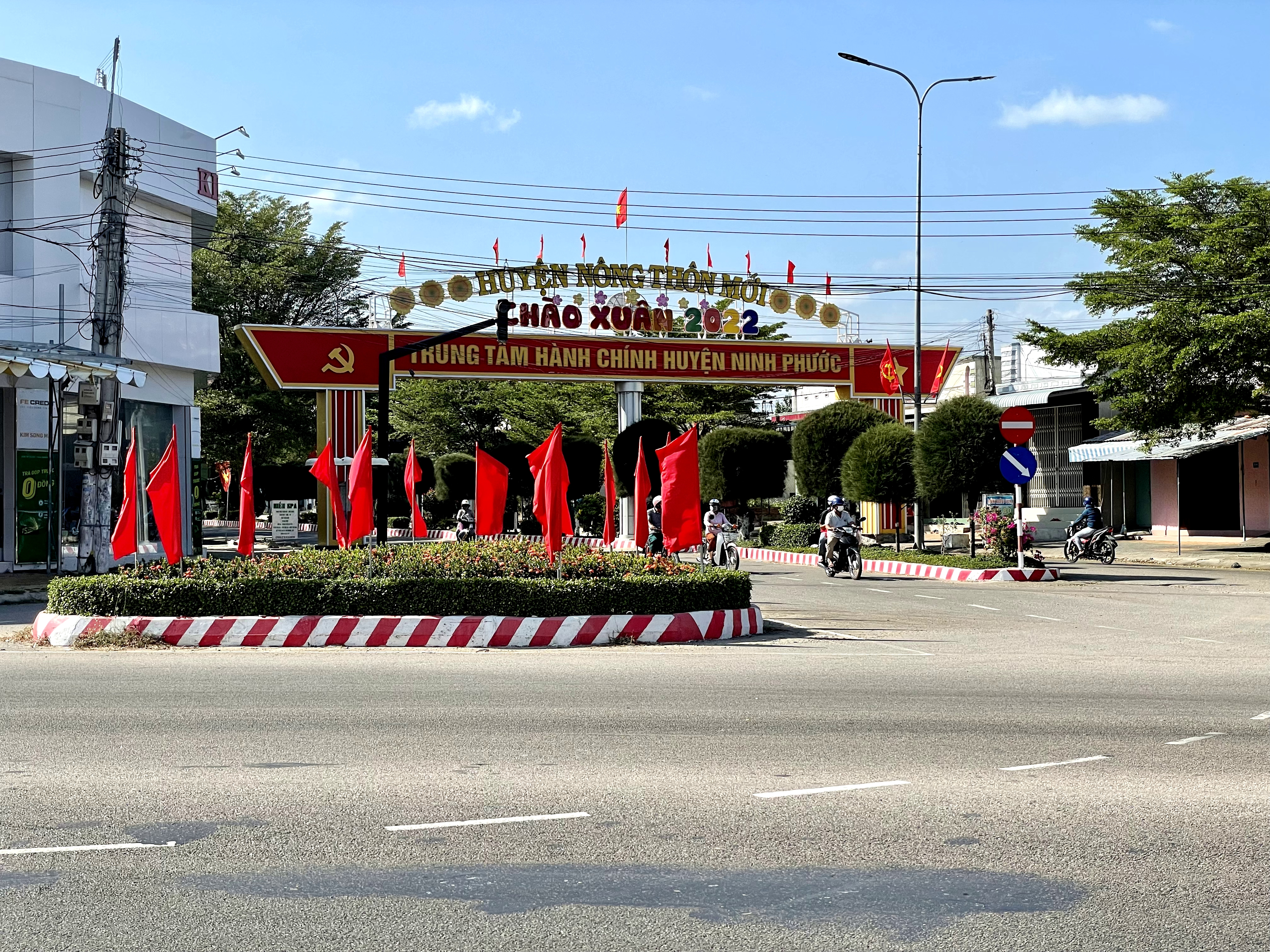
- Ninh Phuoc district administrative center in Phuoc Dan (Phu Quy)
- Interactive map of Ninh Phước district
- Country: Vietnam
- Region: South Central Coast
- Province: Ninh Thuận
- Seat: Phuoc Dan Town

Area
  - City: 341.95 km^{2} (132.03 sq mi)
- Elevation: 22 m (72 ft)

Population (2019)
  - City: 128,028
  - Density: 374/km^{2} (970/sq mi)
  - Urban: 25,444
  - Rural: 102,584

Ninh Phước is a former district (huyện) of Ninh Thuận province in the Southeast region of Vietnam, south of Phan Rang. It is also known as "Phu Quy". The city is growing at a fairly fast rate compared to other cities in Vietnam. The city has many beaches and resorts that are in the making.

Ninh Phước has many farmers usually cultivating grapes and rice. Oxen are abundant. The city is currently underdeveloped. A typical meal from a shop would cost about 7,000.00 đồng, or about US$0.50. (Note: As of 2008, 16,000.00 đồng = US$1.00.)

The primary transportation in the city consists of bikes and mopeds.

== History ==
=== Capital of Champa ===
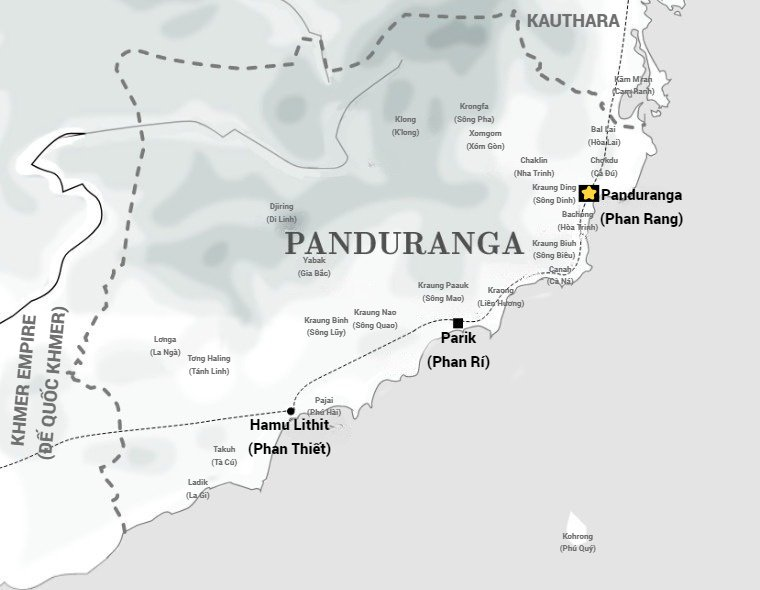
Location of Virapura (Bachong) in Panduranga

Virapura (meaning "City of Bravery"), the capital city of the Champa kingdom during 757 to 875, is believed to have been located in Palai Bachong, Ninh Phuoc district, south of Phan Rang (Panduranga). Similar to Phan Rang, Ninh Phuoc has a large Cham population.

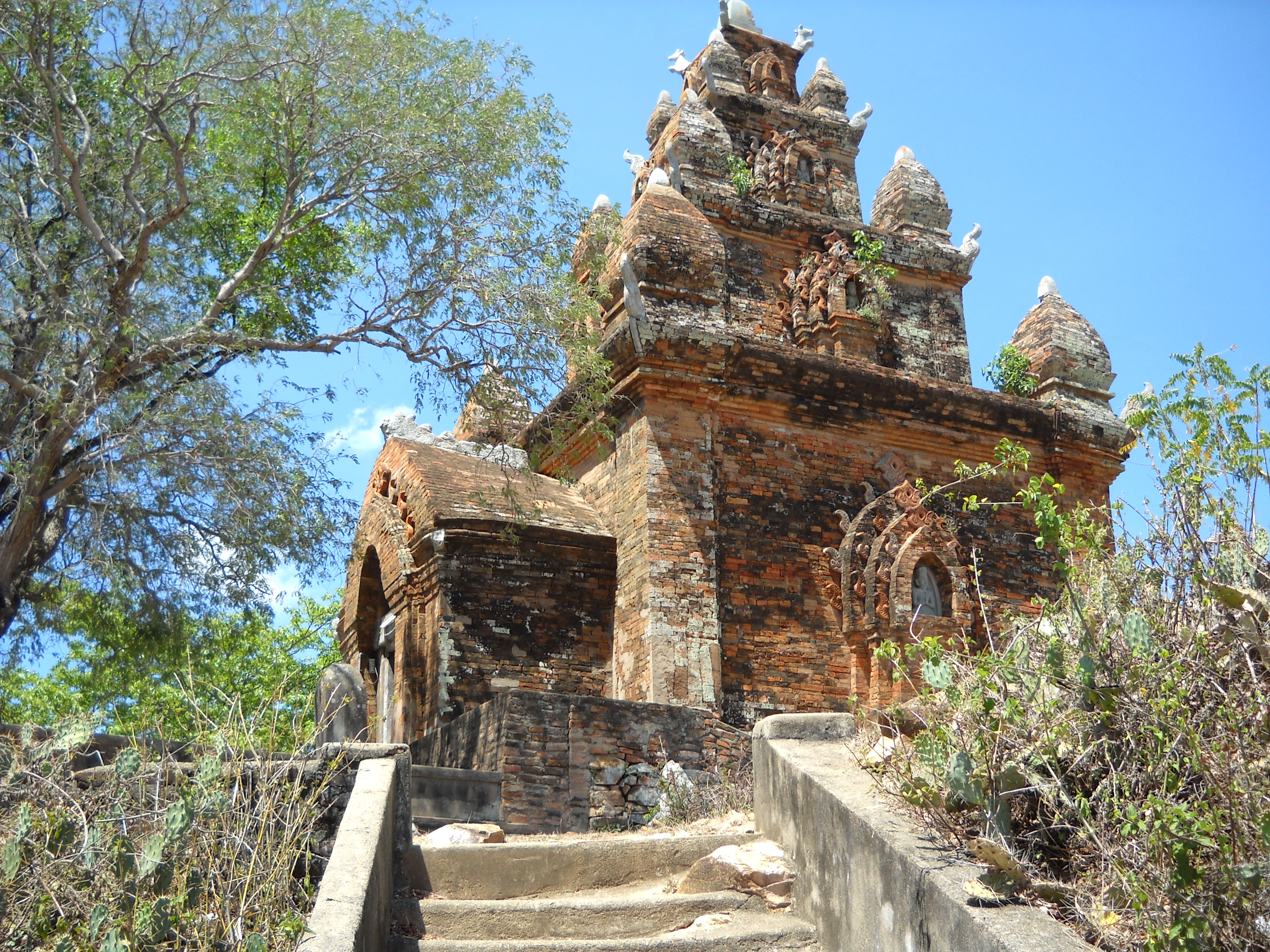
Po Rome Temple (located in Phuoc Huu, Ninh Phuoc)

=== Vietnamese administration ===
Ninh Phuoc district was established on September 1, 1981 on the basis of separating 9 communes: Phuoc Son, Phuoc Ha, Nhi Ha, Phuoc Nam, Phuoc Huu, Phuoc Thai, Phuoc Dan (Phu Quy), Phuoc Hau, Phuoc Thuan of An Son district and 4 communes: Phuoc Diem, Phuoc Dinh, Phuoc Hai, An Hai of the old Ninh Hai district.

In 2009, separate 8 communes: Ca Na, Phuoc Diem, Phuoc Ninh, Phuoc Nam, Phuoc Minh, Phuoc Dinh, Nhi Ha and Phuoc Ha of Ninh Phuoc district to establish Thuan Nam district.

== Geography ==
Ninh Phuoc district is located in the south of Ninh Thuận province, geographically:

- The north and northwest border Ninh Son district.
- The northeast borders the city of Phan Rang – Thap Cham
- The south and southwest border with Thuan Nam district.
- The east bordering South China Sea

== Attractions ==
- Bau Truc pottery village.
- Nam Cuong sand dune.
- Po Rome temple.
