= Khánh Hòa province =

Province of Vietnam

Khánh Hòa ꨇꩆꨨꨩ ꨨꨯꨀꨩ
- Province
- Tỉnh Khánh Hòa 省慶和
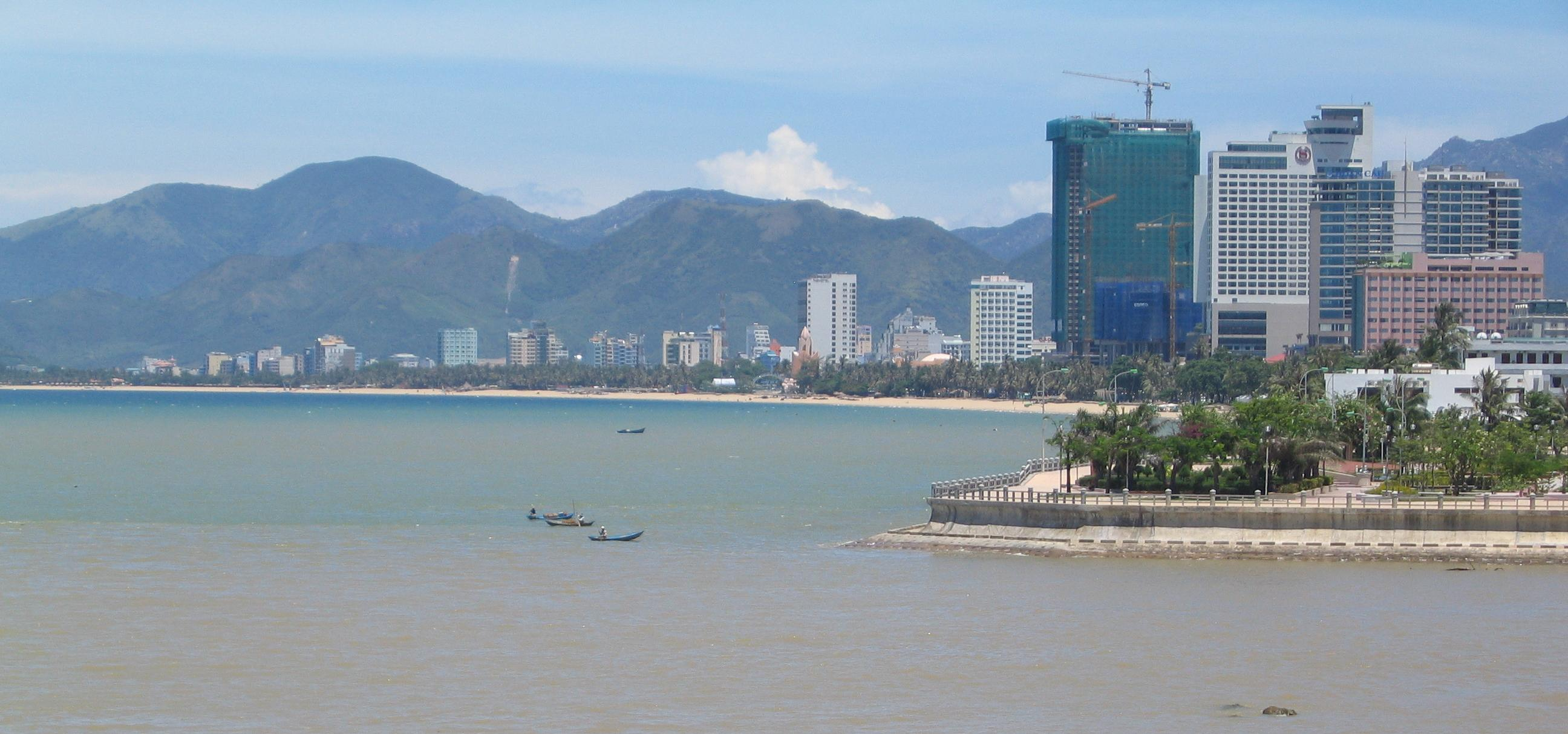
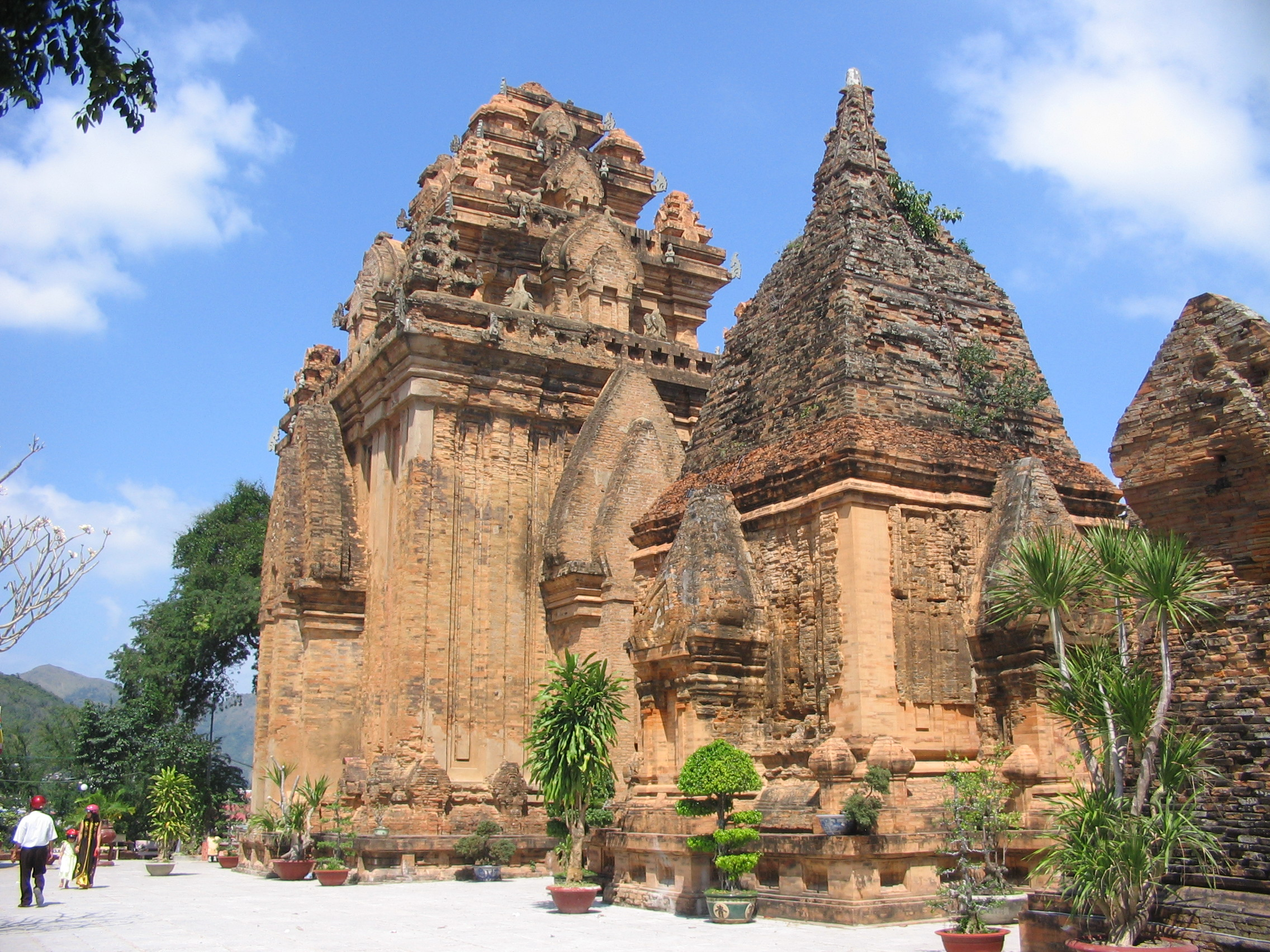
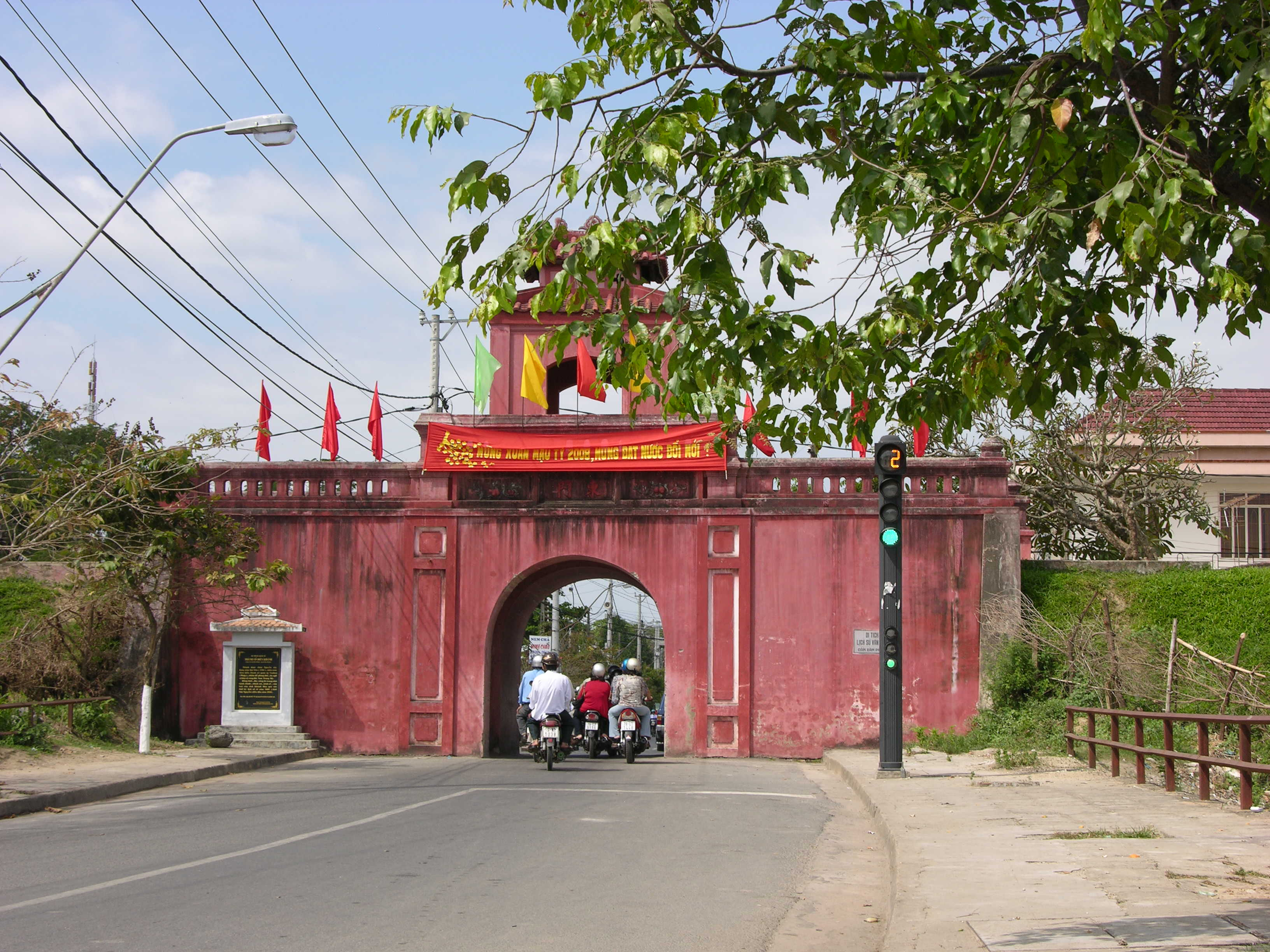
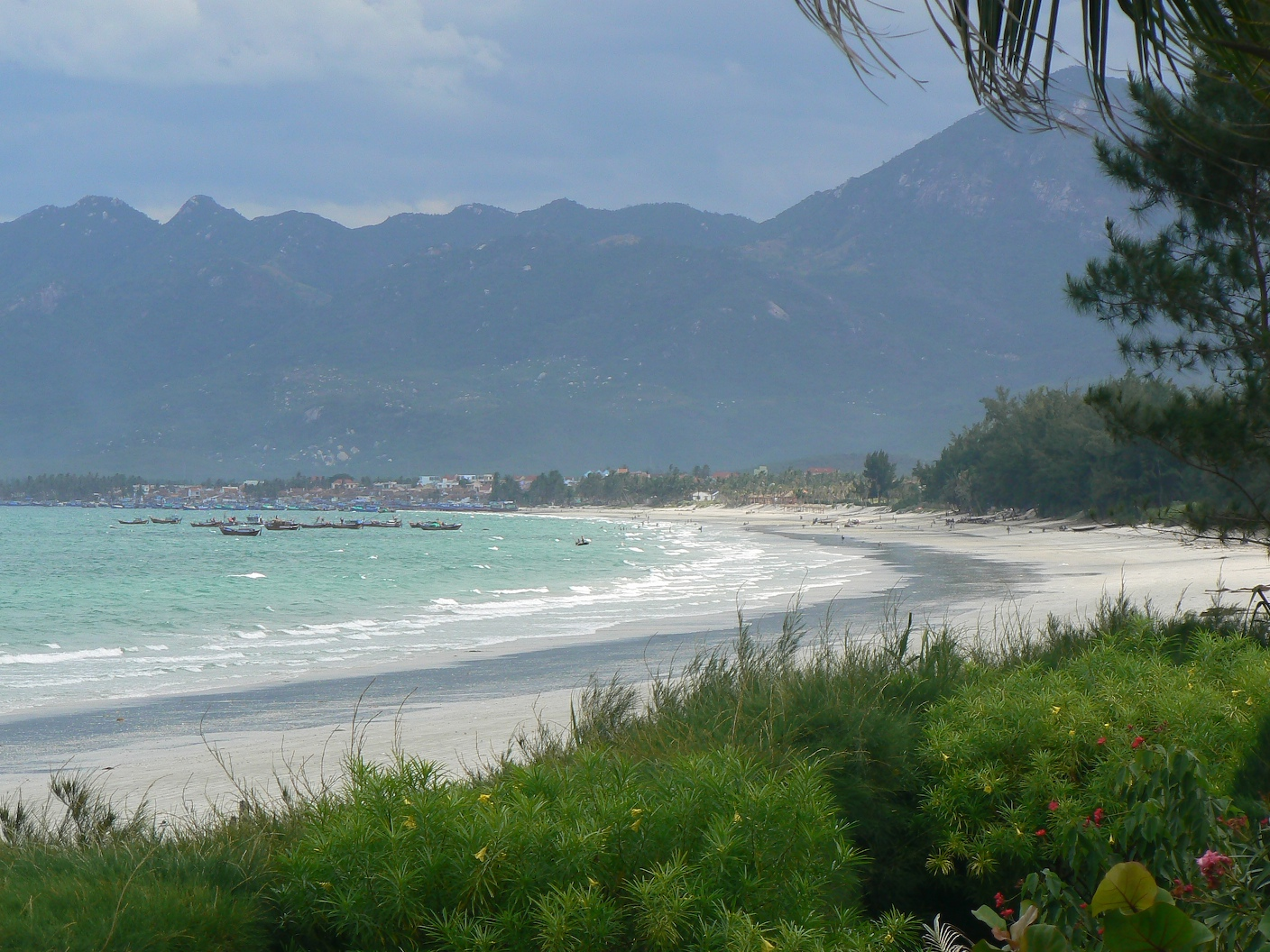
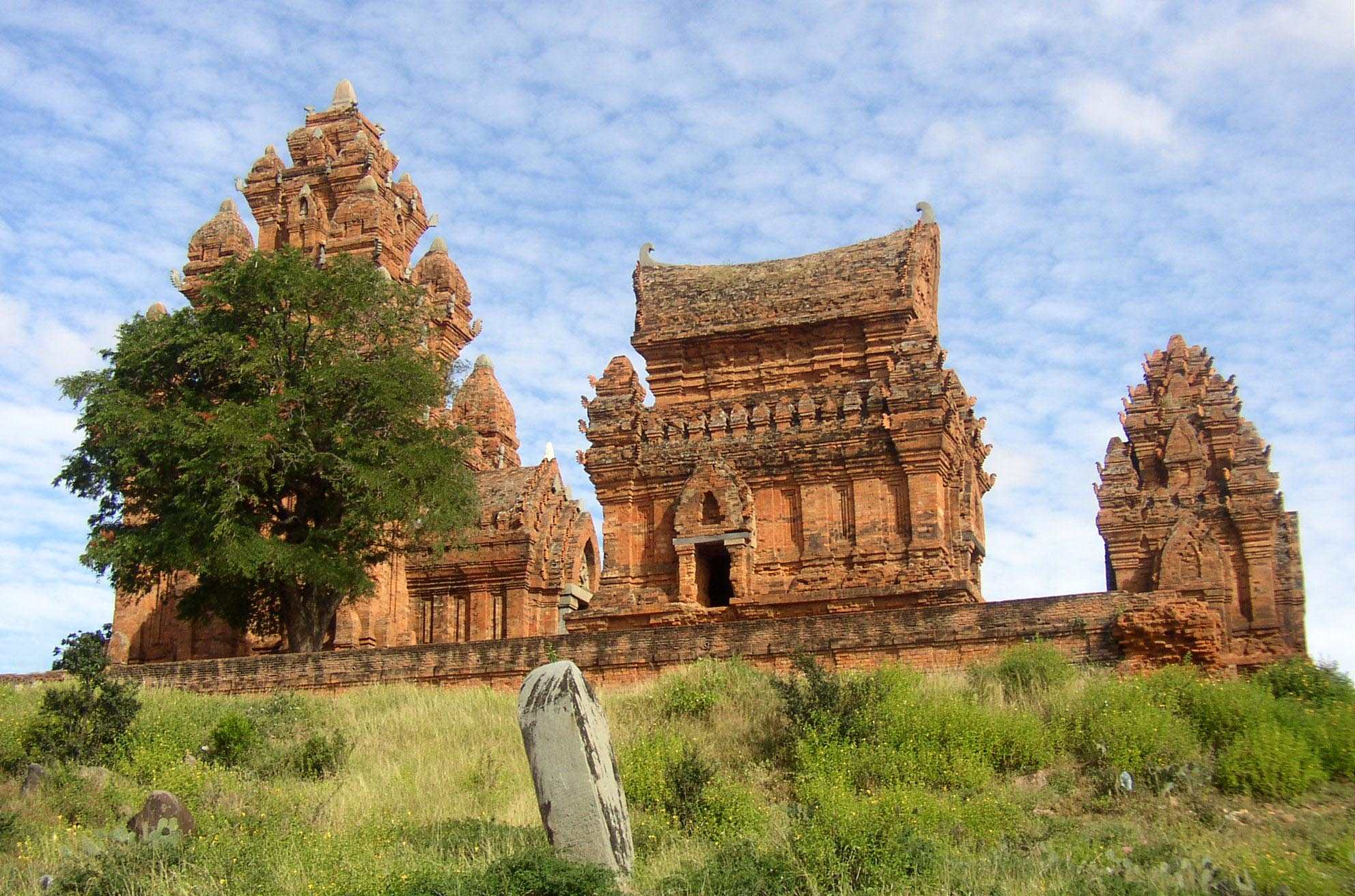
- Clockwise from top: Skyline of Nha Trang; Eastern gate of Dien Khanh Citadel, Dien Khanh; Po Klong Garai Temple; Doc Let Beach; Po Nagar

- Seal
- Nickname: Agarwood Land
- Location of Khánh Hòa within Vietnam
- Interactive map of Khánh Hòa
- Coordinates: 12°15′N 109°12′E
- Country: Vietnam
- Region: South Central Coast
- Capital: Nha Trang ward

Government
  - People's Committee Chair: Nguyễn Tấn Tuân
  - People's Council Chair: Vacant

Area
  - Total: 8,555.86 km^{2} (3,303.44 sq mi)

Population (2025)
  - Total: 2,243,554
  - Density: 262.224/km^{2} (679.158/sq mi)

Demographics
  - Ethnicities: Vietnamese, Raglai, Hoa, Koho, Cham

GDP
  - Total: VND 76.569 trillion US$ 3.325 billion
- Time zone: UTC+7 (ICT)
- Postal code: 57xxx
- Calling code: 258
- ISO 3166 code: VN-34
- HDI (2020): ▲0.736 (19th)
- Website: www.khanhhoa.gov.vn

Khánh Hòa (Vietnamese pronunciation: [xaɲ˧˥ hʷa˨˩], Cham: ꨇꩆꨨꨩ ꨨꨯꨀꨩ) is a coastal province in the south region of Vietnam. It borders Đắk Lắk to the northwest, Lâm Đồng to the southwest and the South China Sea to the east.

In June 2025, it was merged with Ninh Thuận province, forming the new Khánh Hòa Province with an area of 8,555.86 km^{2} (3,303.44 sq mi) and a population of 2,243,554 people. When Jean-Louis Taberd published the map of Annam in 1838, the province was named "Bình Hòa Trấn," with "Trấn" meaning "Department" or province.

== Geography ==
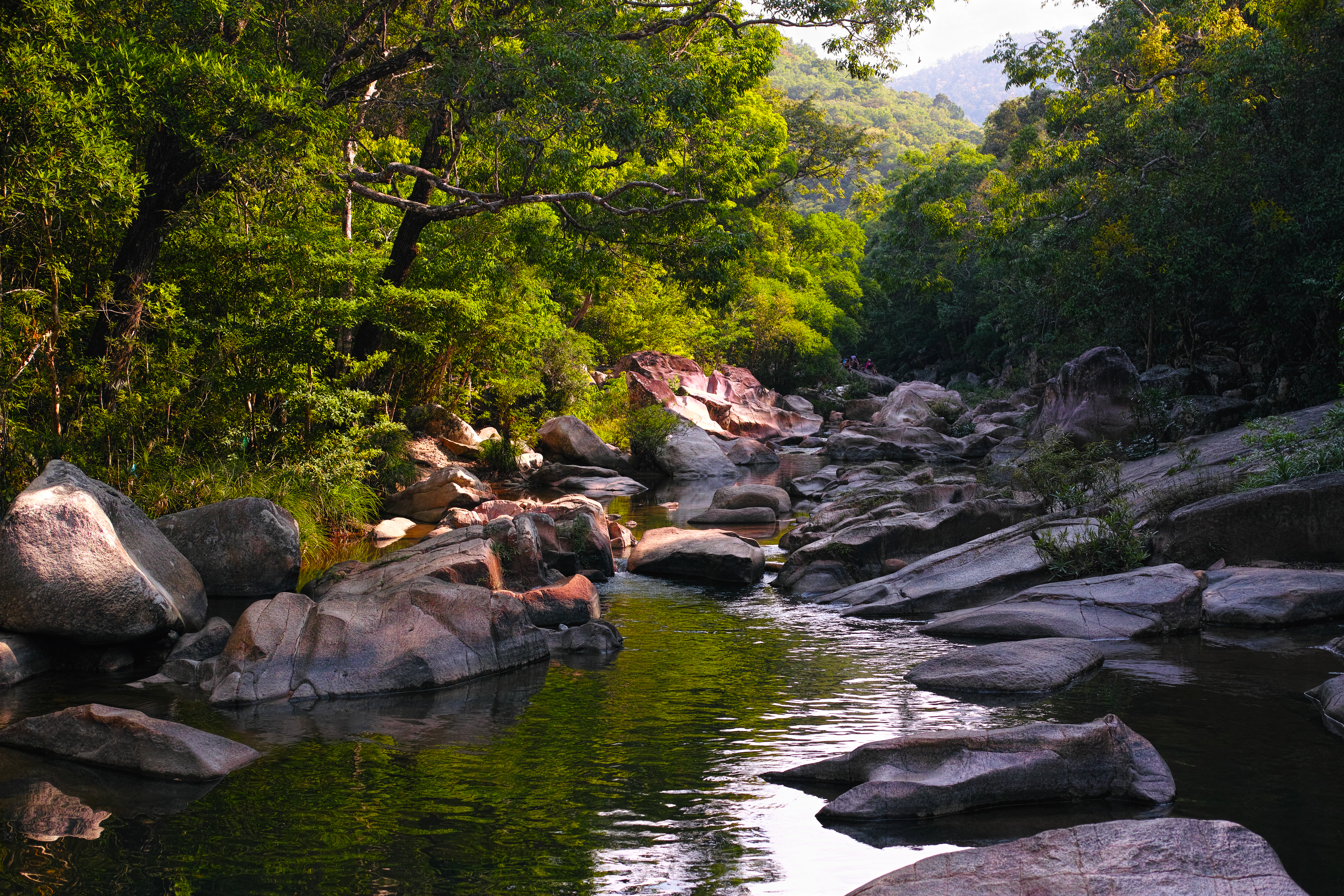
Ba Hồ stream in Khánh Hòa province

The highest peak in the province is Vọng Phu Mountain (2,051 m (6,729 ft)) at the border of Đắk Lắk province. The largest lowland area is located around Ninh Hòa in the north of the province. 87,100 ha (215,230 acres) or 16.7% of Khánh Hòa's total area are used for farming. Forests cover more than half of the province's area.

== Demographics ==
Khánh Hòa had an urban population of 466,500 people or 40.7% of the total in 2007, making it the most urbanized province of the South Central Coast. The average population growth per year between 2000 and 2007 was 1.26%, close to the average of the region. Growth was strongest in urban areas (2.24%).

Cham names for Cham villages in Khánh Hòa province are as follows (Sakaya 2014:755-756).

- Thuận Nam District
  - Ram Văn Lâm
  - Aia Li-u: Phước Lập
  - Aia Binguk: Nghĩa Lập (Chăm Jat)
  - Pabhan: Vụ Bổn
  - Palaw: Hiếu Thiện
- Ninh Phước District
  - Hamu Craok: Bầu Trúc
  - Caklaing: Mỹ Nghiệp
  - Bal Caong: Chung Mỹ
  - Hamu Tanran: Hữu Đức
  - Thuen: Hậu Sanh
  - Mblang Kathaih: Phất Thế
  - Padra: Như Ngọc
  - Cakhaok: Bình Chữ
  - Boah Bini: Hoài Trung
  - Boah Dana: Chất Thường
  - Caok: Hiếu Lễ
  - Mblang Kacak: Phước Đồng
  - Baoh Deng: Phú Nhuận
  - Katuh: Tuấn Tú
  - Cuah Patih: Thành Tín
- Ninh Sơn District
  - Cang: Lương Tri
- Phan Rang–Tháp Chàm
  - Tabeng: Thành Ý
- Ninh Hải District
  - Pamblap Klak: An Nhơn
  - Pamblap Birau: Phước Nhơn
- Thuận Bắc District
  - Bal Riya: Bỉnh Nghĩa

== Economy ==
Khánh Hòa has a GDP per capita of 16.1 million VND (2007). Its agricultural sector is smaller than industry and services. Khánh Hòa has had a trade surplus in years, with exports in 2007 of US$503.3 million and imports of US$222.5 million.

Rice harvests are 188,500t in 2007. Its output of sugar cane (738,200t in 2007, 4.25% of the national figure) and cashew nuts (5,238t, 1.74%) are more significant. Khánh Hòa is one of the provinces with a higher gross output in fishing than in agriculture.

Nha Trang is the South Central Coast's second largest industrial center and the province in general accounts for more than one fifth of the region's industrial GDP. Food processing industries include those processing local fishing products and food for shrimp farms. Other industrial sectors produce beverages, fabric, textiles, paper, and construction materials. The province has investment related to the former Russian naval base at Cam Ranh, to which around 30 factories were attached.

== Infrastructure ==
Khánh Hòa is located along Vietnam's north–south transport corridors. National Road 1 and the North–South Railway run through the province.

Cam Ranh International Airport is located in the south of the province and is the fourth busiest airport in Vietnam, with an international terminal serving as a gateway for international tourists.

== Tourist attraction ==
Nha Trang is the capital and largest city of Khanh Hoa Province, located on Vietnam's south-central coast. The city is known for its beaches. Other attractions include Doc Let Beach and Tu Van Pagoda, a Buddhist temple established in 1968.
