= Thuận Nam district =

District in Vietnam

Coordinates: 11°27′33″N 108°53′55″E

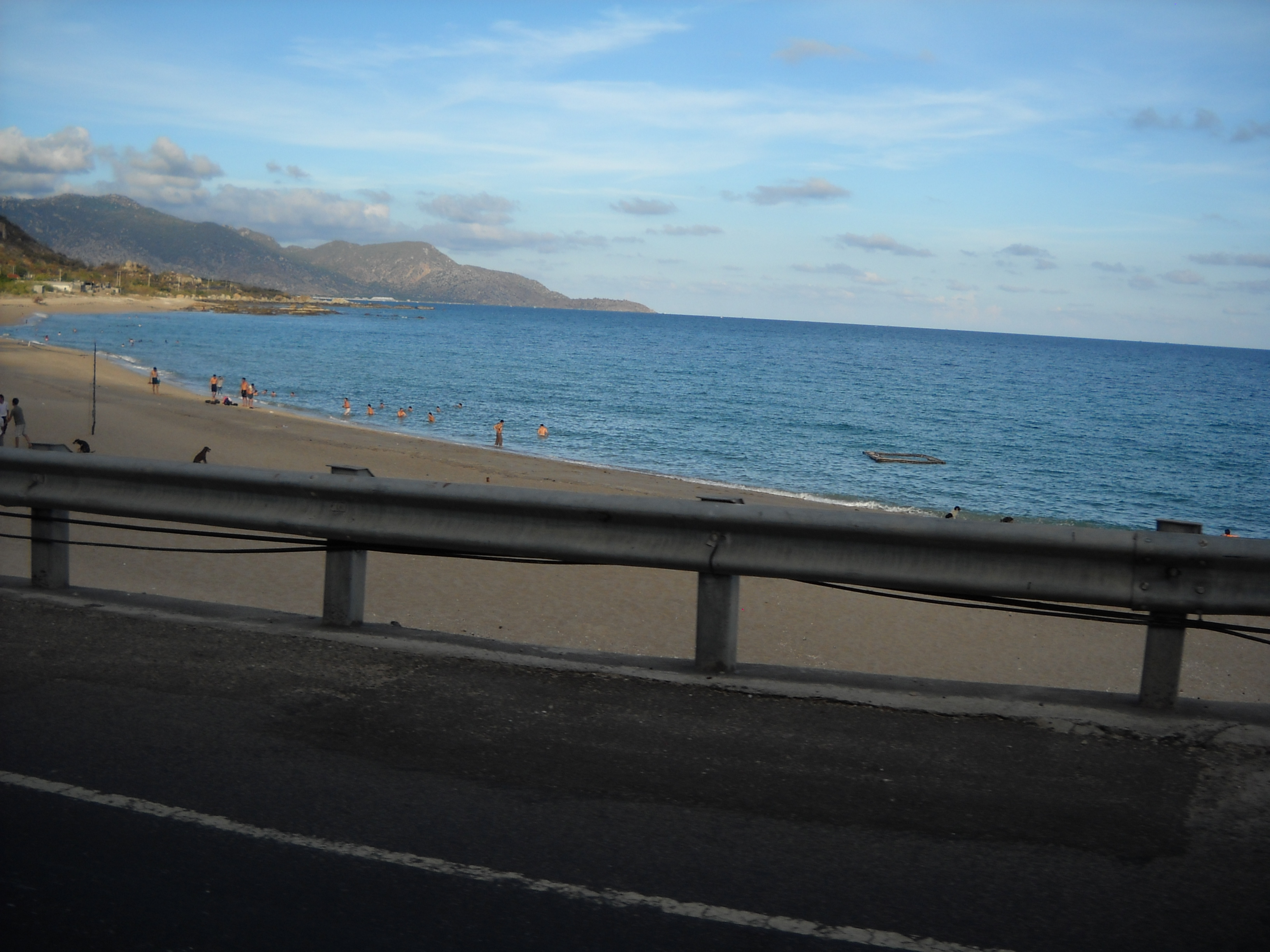
View of Cà Ná beach

Thuận Nam is a former southernmost coastal district of Ninh Thuận province, in the Southeast of Vietnam.

Thuận Nam district has an area of 563.33 km^{2} (217.50 sq mi), population in 2019 is 54,768 people, population density reaches 101 people/km^{2}.

The district also has the Phước Nam Industrial Park which is one of the three industrial parks in the province.

== History ==
It was established on 10 June 2009 following Resolution 26/NQ-CP of the government of Vietnam on land that was previously part of Ninh Phước district.

== Geography ==
Thuận Nam district is located in the southernmost part of Ninh Thuan province. It borders Ninh Sơn district in the west, Tuy Phong district of Bình Thuận province in the south, Ninh Phước district in the north and the South China Sea in the east.

== Divisions ==
Thuận Nam has eight communes:

1. Cà Ná
2. Phước Ninh
3. Phước Diêm
4. Phước Nam
5. Phước Minh
6. Phước Dinh
7. Nhị Hà
8. Phước Hà
